= National Register of Historic Places listings in Hawaii =

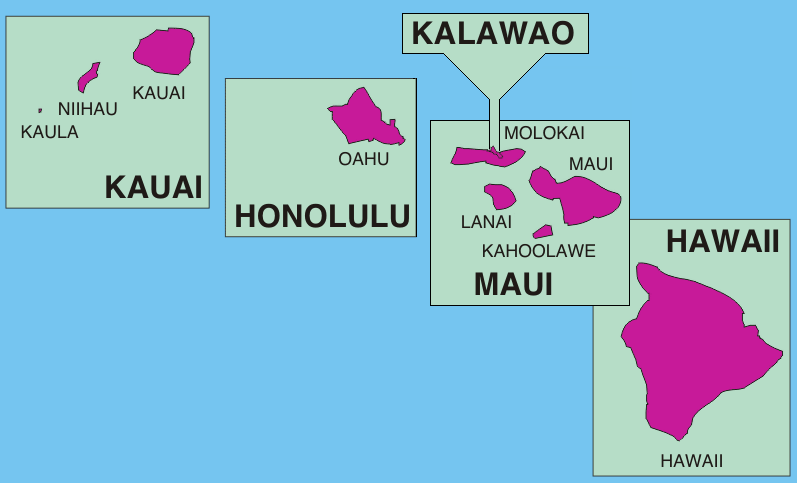
Islands and counties of Hawaii

This is a list of properties and historic districts in Hawaii listed on the National Register of Historic Places. More than 370 listings appear on all but one of Hawaii's main islands (Niʻihau being the exception) and the Northwestern Islands, and in all of its five counties. Included are houses, schools, archeological sites, ships, shipwrecks and various other types of listings. These properties and districts are listed by island, beginning at the northwestern end of the chain.

This National Park Service list is complete through NPS recent listings posted October 9, 2026.

== Current listings by island and county ==
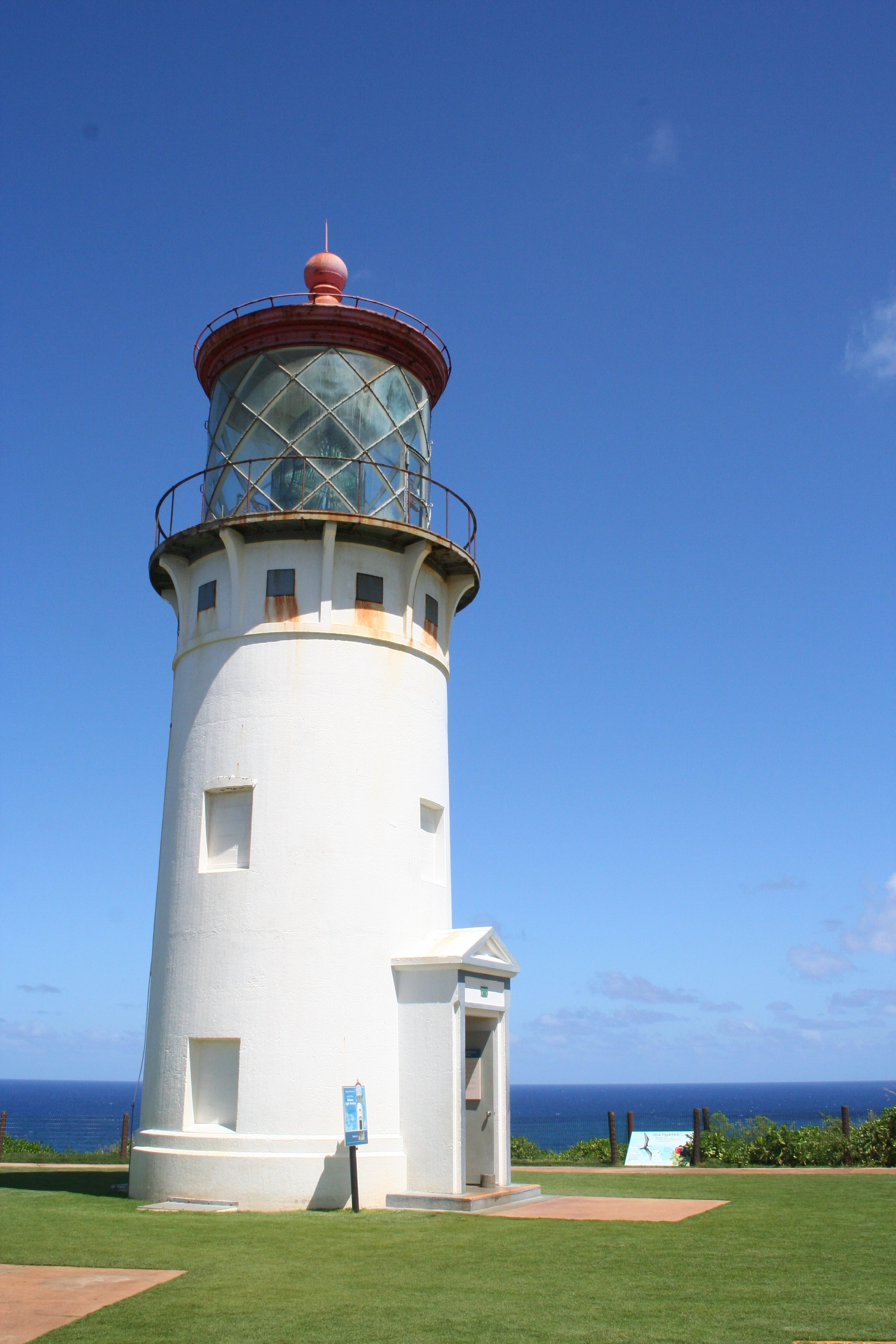
Kilauea Point Lighthouse

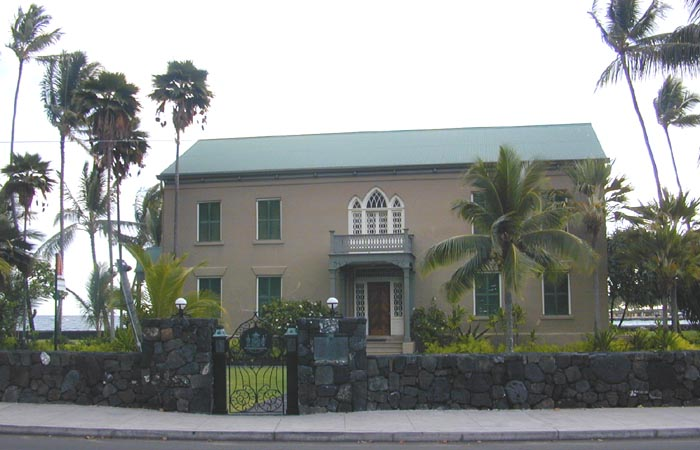
Huliheʻe Palace

The following are approximate tallies of current listings by island and county. These counts are based on entries in the National Register Information Database as of April 24, 2008 and new weekly listings posted since then on the National Register of Historic Places web site, all of which list properties simply by county; they are here divided by island for the sake of easier navigation. There are frequent additions to the listings and occasional delistings, and the counts here are approximate and not official. New entries are added to the official Register on a weekly basis. Also, the counts in this table exclude boundary increase and decrease listings which modify the area covered by an existing property or district and which carry a separate National Register reference number. The number of NRHP listings on each island are documented by tables in each of the individual island lists, and the number of listings in each county is determined by adding the totals of the islands in that county. Kalawao and Maui counties are the sole exception: Kalawao County is a peninsula on Molokaʻi, which is otherwise a part of Maui County.

	Island	# of Sites
1	Northwestern Hawaiian Islands	3
2	Niʻihau	0
3	Kauaʻi	41
4	Oʻahu	171
5	Molokaʻi	27
6	Lānaʻi	2
7	Maui	41
8	Kahoʻolawe	1
9	Hawaii	98
TOTAL		384

	County	# of Sites
1	Hawaii	98
2	Honolulu	174
3	Kalawao	2
4	Kauaʻi	41
5	Maui	69
TOTAL		384

== Northwestern Hawaiian Islands ==
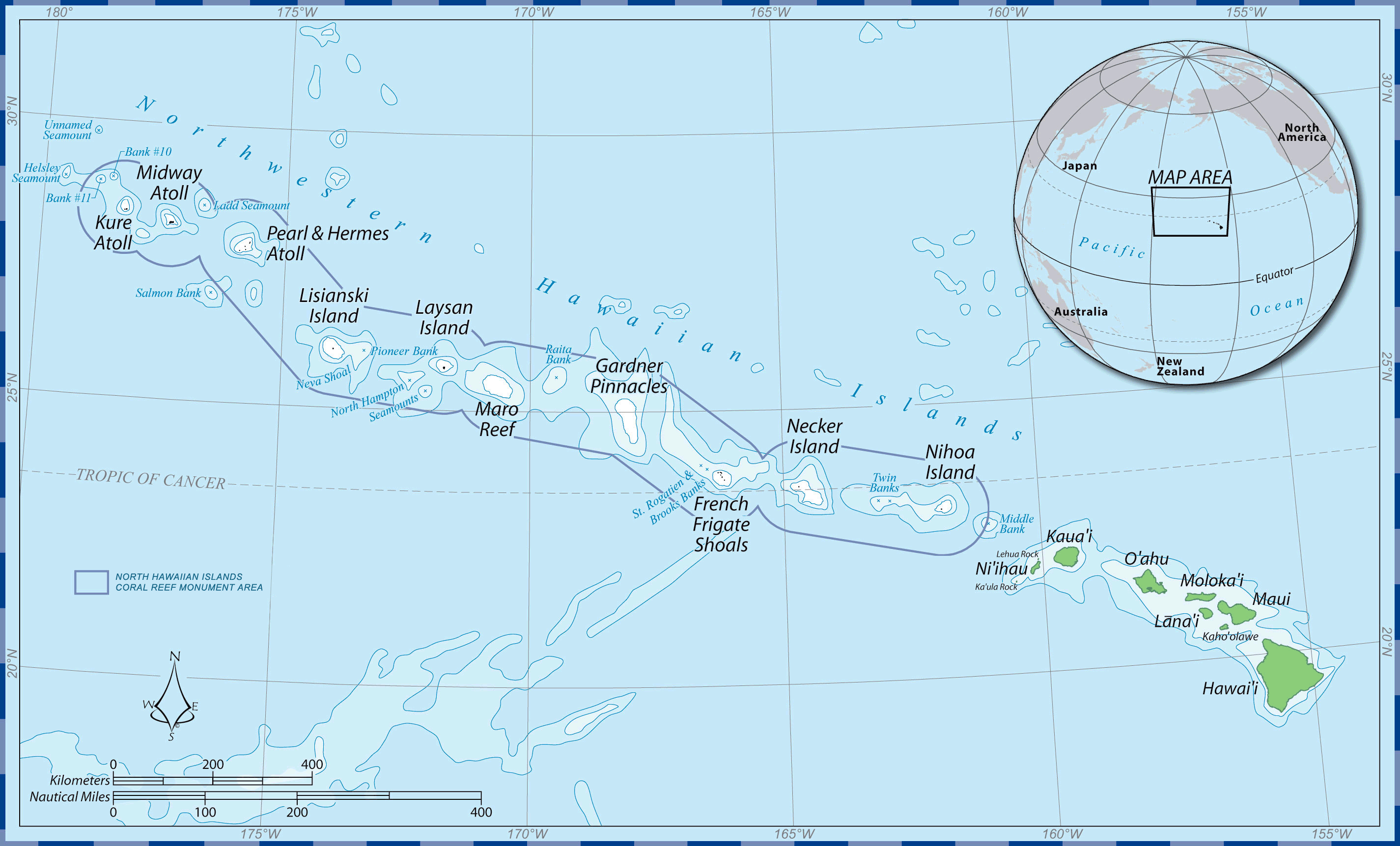
Location of the Northwestern Hawaiian Islands

Many small islands, all uninhabited, lie northwest of Kauaʻi. They are included in Honolulu County, (Note: Midway Atoll is an exception to the inclusion of the Northwestern Hawaiian Islands in Honolulu County. Although part of the Hawaiian archipelago geographically, Midway is under the plenary jurisdiction of the federal government, and is not part of the state of Hawaii. See National Register of Historic Places listings in the United States Minor Outlying Islands for National Register listings on Midway.) despite the vast distance between them and Oʻahu.

	Name on the Register	Image	Date listed	Location	Community	Description
1	Necker Island Archeological District	Necker Island Archeological District	June 13, 1988 (#88000641)	Address Restricted; 23°34′00″N 164°42′00″W	Necker Island	Part or all of the island
2	Nīhoa Island Archeological District	Nīhoa Island Archeological District	June 13, 1988 (#88000640)	Address Restricted; 23°03′41″N 161°55′32″W	Nīhoa Island	Part or all of the island
3	TWO BROTHERS (New England whaling ship) Shipwreck	TWO BROTHERS (New England whaling ship) Shipwreck	August 7, 2017 (#100001416)	Address Restricted	French Frigate Shoals	

== Kauaʻi ==
Location of Kauaʻi

Kauaʻi is the northernmost of the major islands of Hawaii, and except for Niʻihau, the westernmost. Together with Niʻihau, it forms Kauaʻi County.

	Name on the Register	Image	Date listed	Location	Community	Description
1	Bishop National Bank of Hawaii	Bishop National Bank of Hawaii	November 29, 1978 (#78001026)	Hawaii Route 50; 21°57′17″N 159°39′59″W	Waimea	Now First Hawaiian Bank, 4525 Panako Rd., Waimea
2	Camp Sloggett	Camp Sloggett	August 5, 1993 (#93000773)	Southwest of Hawaii Route 550; 22°07′26″N 159°39′02″W	Koke'e State Park	Currently used as a YWCA Camp
3	Civilian Conservation Corps Camp in Koke'e State Park	Civilian Conservation Corps Camp in Koke'e State Park	December 20, 1996 (#96001504)	Hawaii Route 550 at Kokeʻe State Park Headquarters; 22°07′51″N 159°39′33″W	Koke'e State Park	
4	Coco Palms Resort	Coco Palms Resort	February 16, 2021 (#100006139)	4-241 Kuhio Highway; 22°02′57″N 159°20′09″W	Kapaa	
5	Cook Landing Site	Cook Landing Site	October 15, 1966 (#66000298)	2 miles (3.2 km) southwest of Hawaii Route 50; 21°57′11″N 159°39′57″W	Waimea	
6	Charles Gay House		November 1, 1984 (#84000203)	Gay Rd. 21°58′00″N 159°39′39″W	Waimea	
7	Grove Farm	Grove Farm	June 25, 1974 (#74000722)	On Hawaii Route 58, about 1-mile (1.6 km) southeast of Lihue; 21°57′59″N 159°22′06″W	Lihue	Homestead of plantation owner George N. Wilcox, built 1864, converted to museum in 1978
8	Grove Farm Company Locomotives	Grove Farm Company Locomotives	January 19, 1979 (#79000761)	Off Hawaii Route 50; 21°58′06″N 159°23′50″W	Puhi	
9	Gulick-Rowell House	Gulick-Rowell House	April 15, 1978 (#78001027)	Missionary Row (now Huakai Rd.); 21°57′41″N 159°40′19″W	Waimea	Across from Waimea Canyon Middle School, on way to Kauaʻi Veterans Memorial Hospital, first built 1829 by Rev. Peter Johnson Gulick, completed by Rev. George Rowell in 1846
10	Hāʻena Archeological Complex		November 16, 1984 (#84000257)	Beyond Hāʻena State Park at end of Hawaii Route 560 between high cliffs and rocky shore of Kēʻē Bay; 22°13′10″N 159°35′05″W	Hanalei	Sites: (1) house of high chief Lohiʻau (lover of Hiʻiaka); (2) Ke-ahu-a-Laka hālau hula platform; (3) Ka-ulu-a-paʻoa heiau platform
11	Hanalei Elementary School	Hanalei Elementary School	March 14, 1990 (#90000344)	5-5161 Kuhio Hwy. 22°12′10″N 159°29′46″W	Hanalei	Built 1926
12	Hanalei Pier	Hanalei Pier	September 13, 1979 (#79000757)	Hanalei Bay; 22°12′45″N 159°29′52″W	Hanalei	
13	Hanapēpē Town Lot No. 18	Hanapēpē Town Lot No. 18	October 13, 1993 (#93001033)	Hanapēpē Rd. west of its junction with Ko Rd. 21°54′41″N 159°35′10″W	Hanapēpē	Former pool hall
14	Haraguchi Rice Mill	Haraguchi Rice Mill	August 25, 1983 (#83000252)	Ohiki Rd. 22°12′35″N 159°28′36″W	Hanalei	In Hanalei Valley, one of four former rice mills
15	Kauaʻi Belt Road-North Shore section	Kauaʻi Belt Road-North Shore section	February 11, 2004 (#03001048)	Hawaii Route 560; 22°12′43″N 159°31′40″W	Princeville	All or part of Hawaii Route 560
16	Kīkīaola	Kīkīaola	November 16, 1984 (#84000270)	Menehune Rd., Waimea; 21°58′31″N 159°39′35″W	Waimea	A historic ditch purportedly built by the Menehune
17	Kīlauea Plantation Head Bookkeeper's House	Kīlauea Plantation Head Bookkeeper's House	August 5, 1993 (#93000774)	2421 Kolo Rd. 22°12′18″N 159°24′36″W	Kīlauea	
18	Kīlauea Plantation Head Luna's House	Kīlauea Plantation Head Luna's House	August 5, 1993 (#93000775)	2457 Kolo Rd. 22°12′21″N 159°24′38″W	Kīlauea	
19	Kīlauea Plantation Manager's House		August 5, 1993 (#93000777)	4591 Kuawa Rd. 22°12′08″N 159°24′35″W	Kīlauea	
20	Kīlauea Point Light Station	Kīlauea Point Light Station	October 18, 1979 (#79000759)	Kīlauea Point National Wildlife Refuge; 22°13′54″N 159°24′07″W	Kīlauea	A lighthouse located on a narrow peninsula on Kauaʻi's northern coast
21	Kīlauea School	Kīlauea School	August 18, 1983 (#83000254)	2440 Kolo Rd. 22°12′22″N 159°24′34″W	Kīlauea	Est. 1882
22	Kong Lung Store	Kong Lung Store	August 5, 1993 (#93000776)	2484 Keneke Street, on Kilauea Lighthouse Rd., half-mile north of Hawaii Route 56; 22°12′44″N 159°24′25″W	Kīlauea	Originally built to be the Kīlauea Plantation store
23	Kukui Heiau	Kukui Heiau	May 18, 1987 (#86002746)	At Alakukui Point on north shore of Wailua Bay (accessible via public right-of-way between the Kauaʻi Sands and Lae Nani Condominium); 22°03′04″N 159°19′46″W	Wailua	On state land donated by neighboring condo developers; now landscaped, but retains facing walls and offers good view of Wailua Bay
24	Līhuʻe Civic Center Historic District	Līhuʻe Civic Center Historic District	December 17, 1981 (#81000204)	Off Hawaii Route 50; 21°58′30″N 159°22′02″W	Līhuʻe	
25	Līhuʻe Hongwanji Mission	Līhuʻe Hongwanji Mission	March 21, 1978 (#78001025)	North of Līhuʻe at Hawaii Route 56; 21°59′25″N 159°21′56″W	Līhuʻe	At 3-3556-A Kuhio Highway, a branch of Honpa Hongwanji Mission of Hawaii
26	Menehune Fishpond	Menehune Fishpond	March 14, 1973 (#73000677)	On the Hulēʻia River south of Līhuʻe (viewable from lookout on south side of Puhi Road); 21°56′55″N 159°22′20″W	Līhuʻe	Also called Alekoko or Niamalu Pond, bounded by wall 900 yards long at large bend in Hulēʻia River
27	Nā Pali Coast Archeological District	Nā Pali Coast Archeological District	November 16, 1984 (#84000266)	Address Restricted	Hanalei	
28	Nawiliwili Harbor Light		May 26, 2026 (#100013026)	South end of Ninini Point Street; 21°57′18″N 159°20′09″W	Līhuʻe	
29	Old Sugar Mill of Koloa	Old Sugar Mill of Koloa	October 15, 1966 (#66000296)	Maluhia and Koloa Rds. 21°54′17″N 159°27′57″W	Koloa	The mill for Hawaii's first commercially successful sugarcane plantation
30	ʻŌpaekaʻa Road Bridge	ʻŌpaekaʻa Road Bridge	March 28, 1983 (#83000253)	ʻŌpaekaʻa Rd. 22°03′32″N 159°22′41″W	Kapaʻa	First built 1890
31	Puʻuʻōpae Bridge	Puʻuʻōpae Bridge	May 25, 2005 (#05000536)	Puʻuʻōpae Bridge between Kalama and Kipapa Rds. 22°04′06″N 159°22′23″W	Kapaʻa	One-lane, concrete-encased steel bridge on Puʻuʻōpae Rd. at Kipapa Rd.
32	Russian Fort	Russian Fort	October 15, 1966 (#66000299)	On Hawaii Route 50, 200 yards southwest of the bridge over the Waimea River; 21°57′07″N 159°39′52″W	Waimea	
33	Sakuichi and Chieko Matsumoto Residence		March 21, 2024 (#100010092)	2257 Kuai Road; 21°52′30″N 159°27′06″W	Poipu	
34	Seto Building	Seto Building	September 4, 1979 (#79000758)	4-1435 Kuhio Highway; 22°04′39″N 159°19′01″W	Kapaʻa	
35	Sueoka Market		August 16, 2019 (#100004288)	5392 Koloa Rd. 21°54′15″N 159°27′55″W	Koloa	
36	US Post Office-Lihue	US Post Office-Lihue	November 28, 1989 (#89002011)	4441 Rice St. 21°58′29″N 159°22′08″W	Lihue	ZIP code 96766
37	Wailua Complex of Heiaus	Wailua Complex of Heiaus	October 15, 1966 (#66000297)	At the mouth of the Wailua River in the Lihue District, on the eastern coast of Kauaʻi; 22°02′37″N 159°20′09″W	Wailua	Many ruins of old heiau, ancient Hawaiian temples
38	Waiʻoli Mission District	Waiʻoli Mission District	October 3, 1973 (#73000676)	Off Hawaii Route 560; 22°12′04″N 159°30′04″W	Hanalei	Established 1834; Mission Hall, built in 1841, is oldest extant church building on the island; was Congregational, now United Church of Christ
39	Albert Spencer Wilcox Beach House	Albert Spencer Wilcox Beach House	July 30, 1993 (#93000725)	4943 Weke Rd. 22°12′35″N 159°29′44″W	Hanalei	
40	Albert Spencer Wilcox Building	Albert Spencer Wilcox Building	May 31, 1979 (#79000760)	4428 Rice St. 21°58′30″N 159°22′06″W	Līhuʻe	Designed by Hart Wood in 1922, opened as public library in 1924, converted to Kauaʻi Museum in 1970
41	Yamase Building	Yamase Building	April 12, 1996 (#96000398)	4493 Moana Rd. 21°57′20″N 159°40′09″W	Waimea	

== Oʻahu ==
Location of Oʻahu

Oʻahu is the only major island in Honolulu County. The location of the city of Honolulu, Oʻahu is the most populous island in the state.

== Molokaʻi ==
Location of Molokaʻi

Molokaʻi is the northernmost of the islands of Maui County. Unlike every other island in the state, it is divided between two counties: Kalawao County consists of the island's northern peninsula.

	Name on the Register	Image	Date listed	Location	Community	Description
1	Archeological Site (T-10) 50-60-04-702		November 3, 1982 (#82000152)	Address Restricted	Kawela	
2	Archeological Site (T-108) 50-60-03-713		November 5, 1982 (#82000163)	Address Restricted	Kawela	
3	Archeological Site (T-111-116; T-182) 50-60-04-710		November 5, 1982 (#82000164)	Address Restricted	Kawela	
4	Archeological Site (T-12) 50-60-04-704		November 4, 1982 (#82000153)	Address Restricted	Kawela	
5	Archeological Site (T-125-6; T-181) 50-60-03-714		November 5, 1982 (#82000165)	Address Restricted	Kawela	
6	Archeological Site (T-134) 5060-03-718		November 5, 1982 (#82000166)	Address Restricted	Kawela	
7	Archeological Site (T-135-6) 50-60-03-719		November 5, 1982 (#82000167)	Address Restricted	Kawela	
8	Archeological Site (T-155, −158) 50-60-03-721		November 5, 1982 (#82000168)	Address Restricted	Kawela	
9	Archeological Site (T-165-6) 50-60-03-727		November 5, 1982 (#82000169)	Address Restricted	Kawela	
10	Archeological Site (T-19) 50-60-04-705		November 4, 1982 (#82000154)	Address Restricted	Kawela	
11	Archeological Site (T-5, T-122, T-178) 50-60-04-142		November 3, 1982 (#82000150)	Address Restricted	Kawela	
12	Archeological Site (T-57) 50-60-03-720		November 4, 1982 (#82000157)	Address Restricted	Kawela	
13	Archeological Site (T-6 complex) 50-60-04-700		November 3, 1982 (#82000151)	Address Restricted .	Kawela	
14	Archeological Site (T-76) 50-60-03-724		November 4, 1982 (#82000158)	Address Restricted	Kawela	
15	Archeological Site (T-78) 50-60-03-723		November 4, 1982 (#82000170)	Address Restricted	Kawela	
16	Archeological Site (T-79) 50-60-03-726		November 4, 1982 (#82000159)	Address Restricted	Kawela	
17	Archeological Site (T-81, −100, −101, −105, −142) 50-60-03-717		November 4, 1982 (#82000160)	Address Restricted	Kawela	
18	Archeological Site (T-88) 50-60-04-707		November 4, 1982 (#82000161)	Address Restricted	Kawela	
19	Archeological Site (T-92) 50-60-04-708		November 5, 1982 (#82000162)	Address Restricted	Kawela	
20	Archeological Site 50-60-04-140		November 3, 1982 (#82000155)	Address Restricted	Kawela	
21	Archeological Site 50-60-04-144		November 3, 1982 (#82000156)	Address Restricted	Kawela	
22	Southwest Molokaʻi Archeological District		October 15, 1986 (#86002811)	Address Restricted	Maunaloa	
23	Hokukano-Ualapue Complex		October 15, 1966 (#66000304)	On Hawaii Route 45; 21°03′45″N 156°49′48″W	Ualapue	One of Hawaii's most important archeological sites
24	Kamehameha V Wall, Archeological Site (T-20 and T-42-3) 50-60-04-706		November 5, 1982 (#82000174)	Address Restricted; 21°03′45″N 156°49′48″W	Kawela	
25	R. W. Meyer Sugar Mill	R. W. Meyer Sugar Mill	September 4, 1979 (#79000762)	Hawaii Route 470; 21°09′39″N 157°00′32″W	Kalae	

=== Kalawao County ===
	Name on the Register	Image	Date listed	Location	Community	Description
1	Kalaupapa National Historical Park	Kalaupapa National Historical Park	January 7, 1976 (#76002145)	Coextensive with the county 21°10′40″N 156°57′36″W	Kalaupapa	Park preserving sites of two isolation settlements for Hansen's disease sufferers.
2	U.S. Coast Guard Molokai Light	U.S. Coast Guard Molokai Light	March 25, 1982 (#82001724)	North of Kalaupapa; 21°12′44″N 156°58′21″W	Kalaupapa	A lighthouse.

== Lānaʻi ==
Location of Lānaʻi

Lānaʻi is the smallest of the populated islands of Maui County, lying between the islands of Maui and Molokaʻi.

	Name on the Register	Image	Date listed	Location	Community	Description
1	Kaunolu Village Site	Kaunolu Village Site	October 15, 1966 (#66000303)	On southwest coast 20°44′05″N 156°57′52″W	Lānaʻi City	Former fishing village, abandoned in the 1880s, that is the largest surviving ruins of a prehistoric Hawaiian village.
2	Puʻupehe Platform (50La19)	Puʻupehe Platform (50La19)	October 6, 1986 (#86002745)	Between Mānele Bay and Hulopoʻe Bay; 20°44′02″N 156°53′24″W	Lānaʻi City	Also known as Sweetheart Rock

== Maui ==
Location of Maui

Maui is the largest and the easternmost island of Maui County.

	Name on the Register	Image	Date listed	Location	Community	Description
1	William and Mary Alexander Parsonage		October 13, 2026 (#100013505)	2307 Main St. 20°53′11″N 156°30′21″W	Wailuku	
2	Fred C. Baldwin Memorial Home	Fred C. Baldwin Memorial Home	December 1, 2011 (#11000437)	1813 Baldwin Ave. 20°53′12″N 156°20′43″W	Makawao	Built in 1910 by Emily Alexander Baldwin and Henry Perrine Baldwin to provide housing for the elderly. Named for their son Fred Baldwin (1881–1905). Originally designed by H.L. Kerr; restored in 2011 by Xorin Balbes to operate as a lodging and educational facility named Lumeria Maui.
3	Henry Perrine Baldwin High School	Henry Perrine Baldwin High School	June 30, 2000 (#00000667)	Junction of Lower Main St. and Kaahumanu Ave. 20°53′45″N 156°29′38″W	Wailuku	
4	Bank of Hawaii—Haiku Branch	Bank of Hawaii—Haiku Branch	December 4, 2000 (#00001284)	771 Haiku Rd. 20°54′53″N 156°19′22″W	Haʻikū	Built 1931 to serve as bank and post office for bustling Haʻikū; restored in 1998; now used as a commercial property.
5	The Bookkeeper's House, Pioneer Mill-Lahaina Ice Co.		November 14, 2025 (#100010125)	271 Front St. 20°51′45″N 156°40′14″W	Lahaina	
6	Chee Kung Tong Society Building	Chee Kung Tong Society Building	November 15, 1982 (#82000171)	2151 Vineyard St. 20°53′36″N 156°30′29″W	Wailuku	Part of the Chinese Tong Houses of Maui Island TR #82000173. Collapsed in 1996; only gate and foundation remain.
7	Crater Historic District	Crater Historic District	November 1, 1974 (#74000289)	Address Restricted	Kahului	
8	Frank and Theresa Gomes House	Frank and Theresa Gomes House	June 15, 2001 (#01000616)	32 Pakani Place; 20°50′58″N 156°19′03″W	Makawao	
9	Haiku Mill		February 6, 1986 (#86000189)	Haiku Rd. 20°55′49″N 156°19′58″W	Haʻikū	
10	Hale Paʻi	Hale Paʻi	May 13, 1976 (#76000662)	Lahainaluna High School; 20°53′40″N 156°39′45″W	Lahaina	
11	Halekii-Pihana Heiau	Halekii-Pihana Heiau	November 25, 1985 (#85002972)	Hea Pl. off Kuhio Pl. from Waiehu Beach Rd. 20°54′30″N 156°29′42″W	Wailuku	
12	Hana Belt Road	Hana Belt Road	June 15, 2001 (#01000615)	Hana Highway (Hawaii Route 360) and Pi'ilani Highway (Hawaii Route 31); 20°53′52″N 156°13′20″W	Makawao	
13	Hana District Police Station and Courthouse	Hana District Police Station and Courthouse	August 27, 1991 (#91001086)	Uakea Rd. 20°45′44″N 155°59′21″W	Hana	
14	Hardy House	Hardy House	November 8, 1984 (#84002640)	808 Makawao Ave. 20°51′06″N 156°19′25″W	Makawao	Built in 1897 for Makawao School principal Frederick Hardy (d. 1920) & wife Lillian, who sold the house & 20-acre (81,000 m^{2}) lot in 1920. Ernest and Alene Rezents bought the house in 1961 and restored what is now locally known as the Rezents House.
15	Holy Ghost Catholic Church	Holy Ghost Catholic Church	August 18, 1983 (#83000255)	4300 Lower Kula Rd. 20°46′04″N 156°20′22″W	Kula	
16	Honokalani Village		November 25, 1985 (#85003333)	Address Restricted	Hana	
17	Iao Theater	Iao Theater	February 9, 1995 (#94001622)	68 N. Market St. 20°53′37″N 156°30′17″W	Wailuku	
18	Ka'ahumanu Avenue-Naniloa Drive Overpass	Ka'ahumanu Avenue-Naniloa Drive Overpass	November 19, 2008 (#08001065)	Naniloa Dr. at Kaahumanu Ave. 20°53′19″N 156°29′46″W	Wailuku	
19	Ka'ahumanu Church	Ka'ahumanu Church	May 12, 1975 (#75000622)	S. High St. 20°53′49″N 156°30′01″W	Wailuku	Est. 1876
20	Kahului Railroad Administration Building	Kahului Railroad Administration Building	May 17, 2016 (#16000274)	101 E. Kaahumanu Ave. 20°53′34″N 156°27′52″W	Kahului	
21	Kalepolepo Fishpond	Kalepolepo Fishpond	December 30, 1996 (#96001503)	S. Kihei Rd., south of its junction with Hawaii Route 31 in Kalepolepo County Park; 20°46′00″N 156°27′45″W	Kihei	
22	William K. Kaluakini House		July 3, 2013 (#13000458)	450 Front St. 20°52′00″N 156°40′26″W	Lahaina	
23	Kaupo School		June 30, 2000 (#00000662)	Government Rd. 20°38′13″N 156°07′21″W	Kaupo	
24	Keanae School	Keanae School	June 30, 2000 (#00000665)	Hana Highway; 20°51′21″N 156°08′29″W	Keanae	
25	Ket Hing Society Building	Ket Hing Society Building	November 15, 1982 (#82000172)	Cross Rd. 20°42′35″N 156°21′11″W	Kula	Part of the Chinese Tong Houses of Maui Island TR #82000173.
26	King Kamehameha III's Royal Residential Complex	King Kamehameha III's Royal Residential Complex	May 9, 1997 (#97000408)	Junction of Front and Shaw Sts., Malu'ulu o Lele and Kamehameha Iki Parks; 20°52′24″N 156°40′39″W	Lahaina	
27	Lahaina Historic District	Lahaina Historic District	October 15, 1966 (#66000302)	Western side of Maui on Hawaii Route 30; 20°52′14″N 156°41′03″W	Lahaina	
28	Loaloa Heiau	Loaloa Heiau	October 15, 1966 (#66000301)	Southeastern coast of Maui, on Hawaii Route 31, about 0.25 miles (0.40 km) north of Kaupo; 20°38′41″N 156°07′26″W	Kaupo	
29	Maʻalaea General Store	Maʻalaea General Store	September 30, 2013 (#13000795)	132 Maʻalaea Road; 20°47′32″N 156°30′42″W	Wailuku vicinity	Built in 1910 and accurately restored. The store and the Shinto Shrine next door are all that remains of the Japanese fishing village there prior to World War II.
30	Makawao Union Church	Makawao Union Church	December 17, 1985 (#85003227)	1445 Baldwin Ave. 20°53′32″N 156°21′03″W	Paia	1916 stone church designed by C. W. Dickey
31	Maui Jinsha Mission	Maui Jinsha Mission	November 21, 1978 (#78001028)	472 Lipo St. 20°54′29″N 156°29′16″W	Wailuku	est. 1915, architect Ichitaro Takata
32	Old Bailey House	Old Bailey House	March 20, 1973 (#73000678)	Iao Valley Rd. 20°53′27″N 156°30′37″W	Wailuku	
33	Paia School	Paia School	August 22, 2000 (#00000664)	955 Baldwin Ave. 20°54′11″N 156°21′24″W	Pāʻia	Founded in 1881 as Maui's first all English-speaking school. First principal William Cross refused to learn Hawaiian. 1909 building burned down in 1963. Current main building dates from 1926. Became site of Maui's first public school Hawaiian-immersion program in 1988.
34	Piilanihale Heiau	Piilanihale Heiau	October 15, 1966 (#66000300)	4 miles (6.4 km) north of Hana, at the mouth of Honomāʻele Gulch near Kalahu Point; 20°47′57″N 156°02′18″W	Hana	Within Kahanu Garden
35	Puunene School	Puunene School	August 22, 2000 (#00000663)	East Camp 5 Rd. off Old Puunene Ave. 20°51′44″N 156°26′56″W	Puʻnēnē	1922 school building near sugar mill
36	Wai'ale Drive Bridge	Wai'ale Drive Bridge	October 30, 1998 (#98001287)	Ka'ahumanu Ave., 0.1 miles (0.16 km) east of Kinipopo St. 20°53′39″N 156°30′06″W	Wailuku	
37	Waihee Church	Waihee Church	April 21, 1994 (#94000384)	Kahekili Highway; 20°56′06″N 156°30′54″W	Waihee	est. 1828
38	Wailuku Civic Center Historic District	Wailuku Civic Center Historic District	August 20, 1986 (#86001624)	S. High St. between Wells and Kaohu Sts. 20°53′25″N 156°30′26″W	Wailuku	Contributing properties: Old Courthouse (1907, Kerr), Old Police Station (1925, D'Esmond), Wailuku Library (1928, Dickey), Territorial Office Building (1931, Dickey)
39	Wailuku School	Wailuku School	June 30, 2000 (#00000666)	355 S. High St. 20°53′17″N 156°30′29″W	Wailuku	est. 1904, architect C. W. Dickey
40	Wananalua Congregational Church	Wananalua Congregational Church	November 23, 1988 (#88002533)	Hana Highway and Haouli St. 20°45′07″N 155°59′12″W	Hana	
41	Wo Hing Society Building	Wo Hing Society Building	November 15, 1982 (#82000173)	848 Front St. 20°52′52″N 156°40′59″W	Lahaina	In the Lahaina Historic District; Part of the Chinese Tong Houses of Maui Island TR #82000173.

== Kahoʻolawe ==
Location of Kahoʻolawe

Kahoʻolawe is the smallest and the southernmost island of Maui County. Alone among the state's major islands, it is uninhabited.

	Name on the Register	Image	Date listed	Location	Community	Description
1	Kahoʻolawe Island Archeological District	Kahoʻolawe Island Archeological District	March 18, 1981 (#81000205)	Kahoʻolawe; 20°33′N 156°36′W	Kahoʻolawe	The district includes the entire island, which contains over 500 individual archeological sites

== Island of Hawaiʻi ==
Location of the island of Hawaiʻi

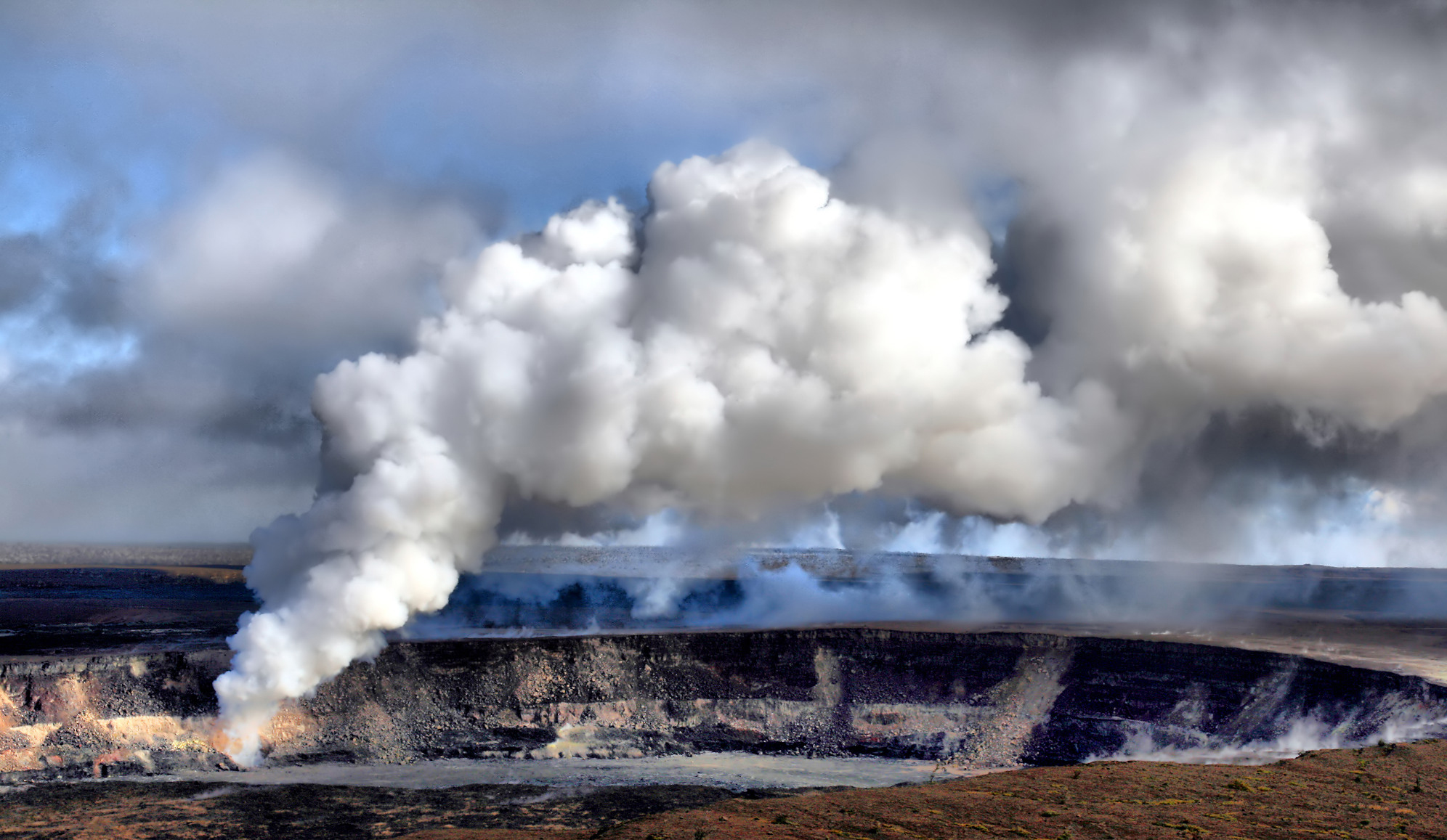
Kilauea Crater is in Hawaiʻi Volcanoes National Park, a UNESCO World Heritage Site

The government of the island of Hawaiʻi is Hawaiʻi County, the only county that covers exactly one island, the largest in area in the state. There are 95 properties and districts on the island, including 11 historic districts, six National Historic Landmarks, and one which is a National Historic Landmark District.
