= Maui National Wildlife Refuge Complex =

Wildlife protected area in Hawaii

Coordinates: 20.7944°N 156.4658°W

Maui National Wildlife Refuge Complex is a National Wildlife Refuge complex in the state of Hawaii.

== Refuges within the complex ==
- Kakahaia National Wildlife Refuge
- Kealia Pond National Wildlife Refuge
