= Camp Sloggett =

- U.S. National Register of Historic Places
- Hawaiʻi Register of Historic Places
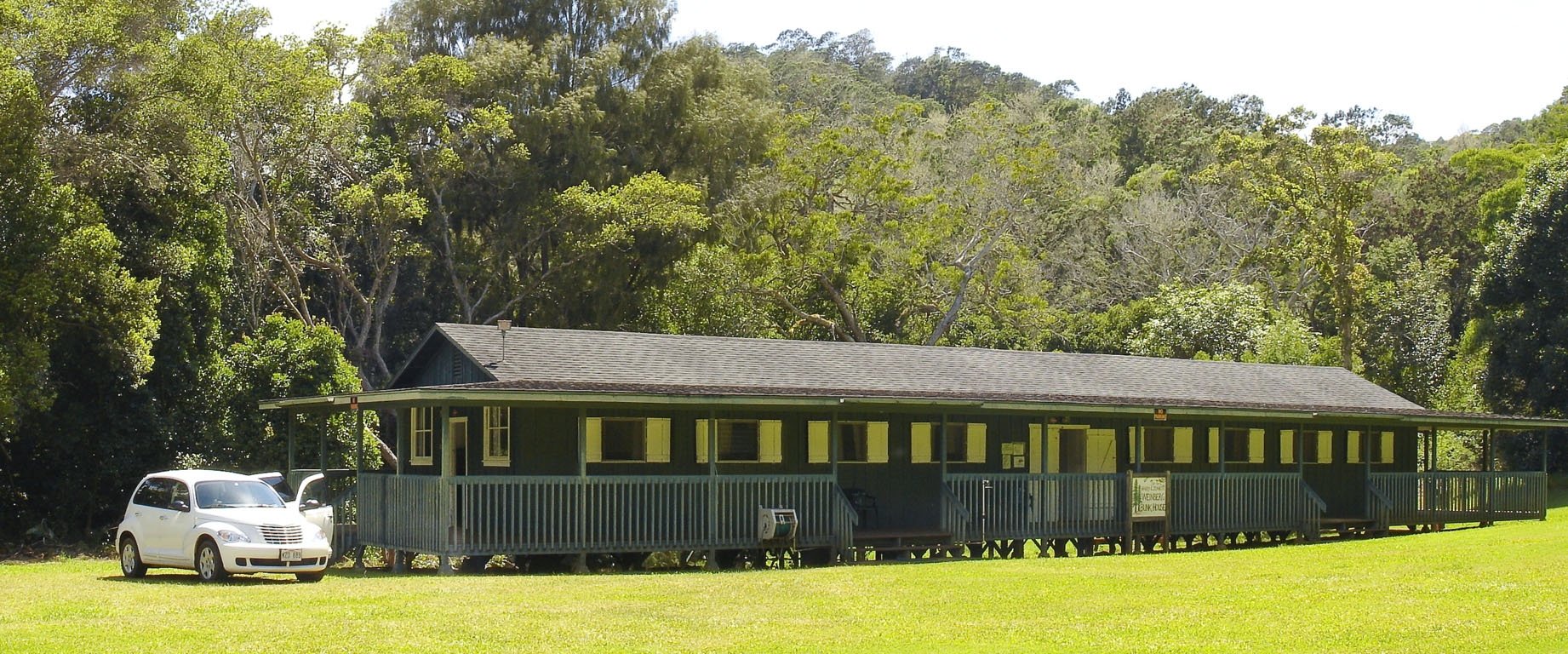

- Location within Hawaii
- Location: Southwest of Hawaii Route 550
- Nearest city: Kōkeʻe, Hawaii
- Coordinates: 22°7′36″N 159°39′11″W
- Area: 3.6 acres (1.5 ha)
- Built: 1921
- NRHP reference No.: 93000773
- HRHP No.: 50-30-06-09395

Significant dates
- Added to NRHP: August 5, 1993
- Designated HRHP: August 5, 1993

Camp Sloggett in Kōkeʻe State Park near Kōkeʻe, Hawaii, is a historic site with significance from 1921. It is within state lands but has buildings owned by the Kauaʻi Young Women's Christian Association.

It was listed on both the Hawaiʻi Register of Historic Places and the National Register of Historic Places (NRHP) on August 5, 1993. The NRHP listing included one contributing building and one contributing structure, as well as four non-contributing buildings and structures.

It was deemed significant "as a surviving example of camp architecture from the early 1920s and for its associations with the Sloggett family and the YWCA." The Kauaʻi YWCA took ownership in 1964 and tried to run it as a traditional YWCA-type camp providing one or two-week camp experiences for children; this proved unworkable, and the YWCA has since operated it as a fee-for-services camp available to various groups.
