= Hāʻena Archeological Complex =

- U.S. National Register of Historic Places
- U.S. Historic district
- Hawaiʻi Register of Historic Places
- Location: Beyond Hāʻena State Park at end of Hawaii Route 560 between high cliffs and rocky shore of Kēʻē Bay
- Nearest city: Hanalei, Hawaii
- Area: 57.5 acres (23.3 ha)
- NRHP reference No.: 84000257
- HRHP No.: 50-30-02-01600

Significant dates
- Added to NRHP: November 16, 1984
- Designated HRHP: September 14, 1984

The Hāʻena Archeological Complex, on Kauaʻi near Hanalei, Hawaii, is an archeological site complex that is listed on the U.S. National Register of Historic Places.

It includes several sites: (1) house of high chief Lohiʻau (lover of Hiʻiaka); (2) Ke-ahu-a-Laka hālau hula platform; (3) Ka-ulu-a-paʻoa heiau platform It dates from c.1600 and is listed on the National Register for its potential to yield information in the future. The listed site includes 57.5 acres (23.3 ha) with 17 contributing sites and nine contributing structures. It was listed on the National Register in 1984.
