= Bishop National Bank of Hawaii =

- U.S. National Register of Historic Places
- Hawaiʻi Register of Historic Places
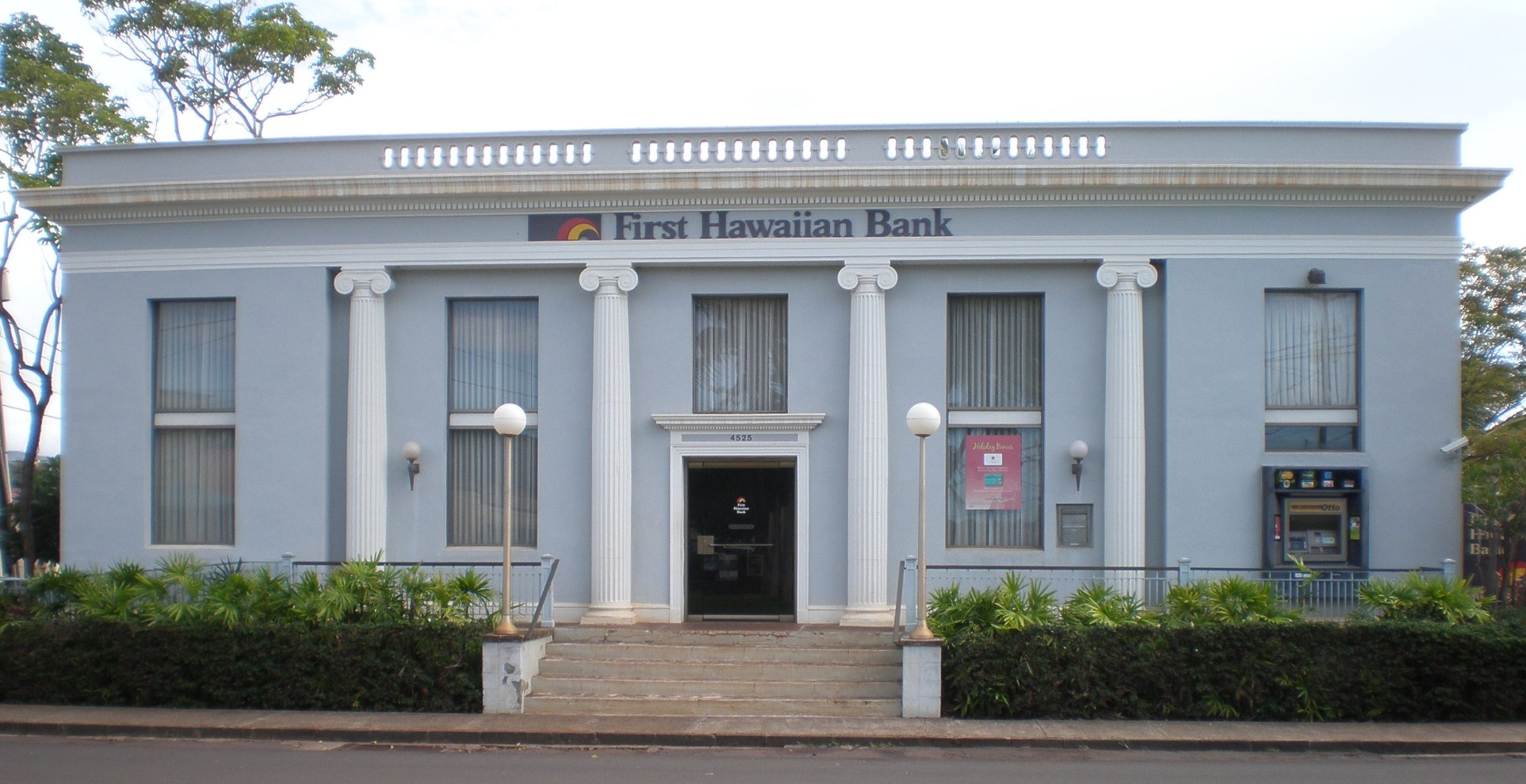

- Location within Hawaii
- Location: 4525 Panako Rd., HI 50, Waimea, Hawaii
- Coordinates: 21°57′34″N 159°40′9″W
- Area: 0.2 acres (0.081 ha)
- Built: 1929
- Built by: J.L. Young Engineering Co.
- Architect: Mason, John
- Architectural style: Classical Revival
- NRHP reference No.: 78001026
- HRHP No.: 50-30-05-09311

Significant dates
- Added to NRHP: November 29, 1978
- Designated HRHP: November 19, 1977

The Bishop National Bank of Hawaii was a bank in Hawaii. Its branch building on Hawaii Route 50 in Waimea, Kauaʻi, Hawaii, was built in 1929. That branch building has also been known as First Hawaiian Bank, as Bishop National Bank, Waimea Branch, and as Bishop First National Bank, Waimea Branch. The building includes Classical Revival architecture and was a work of architect John Mason and of J.L. Young Engineering Co. The building was listed on the Hawaiʻi Register of Historic Places in 1977 and on the National Register of Historic Places (NRHP) in 1978.

The building replaced a 1911 building that had been the second Bishop National Bank branch, after the first built in Hilo. According to its NRHP nomination, the building "is important mainly for its architectural value. Its eclectic style and solid, imposing appearance is typical of post-World War I banking architecture. It is designed to give an aura of permanence and stability--a visual assurance to Waimea's inhabitants that the bank was 'here to stay.'"

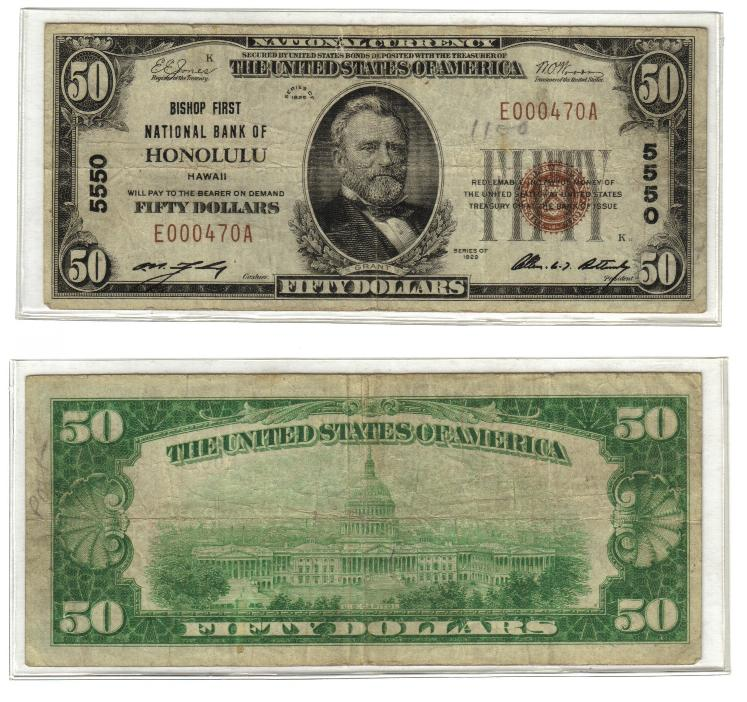
A $50 National Bank Note issued by the Bishop First National Bank

The building is now a First Hawaiian Bank branch.
