= Paia Elementary School =

- Paia Elementary School (as Paia School)
- U.S. National Register of Historic Places
- Hawaiʻi Register of Historic Places
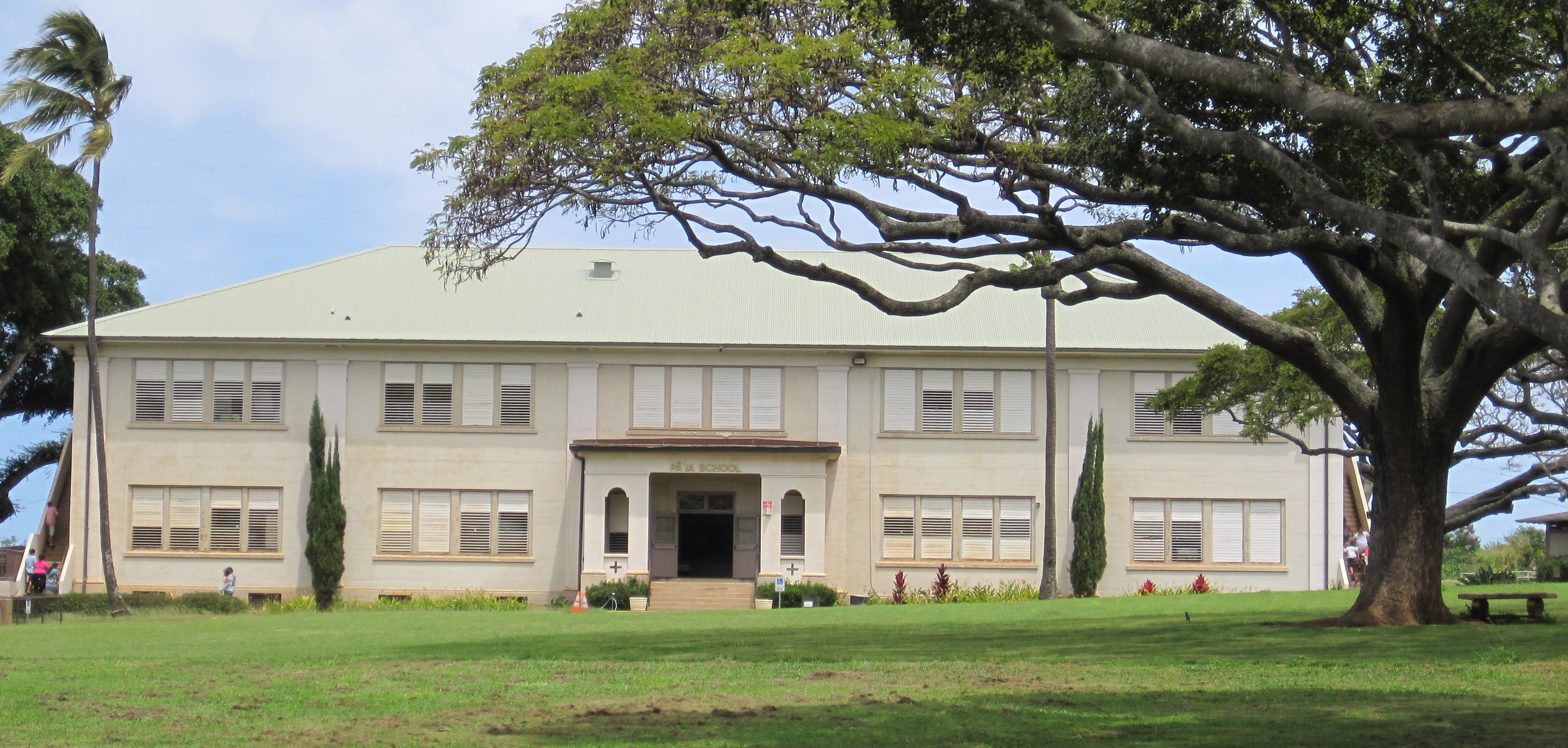
- Paia Elementary School main building

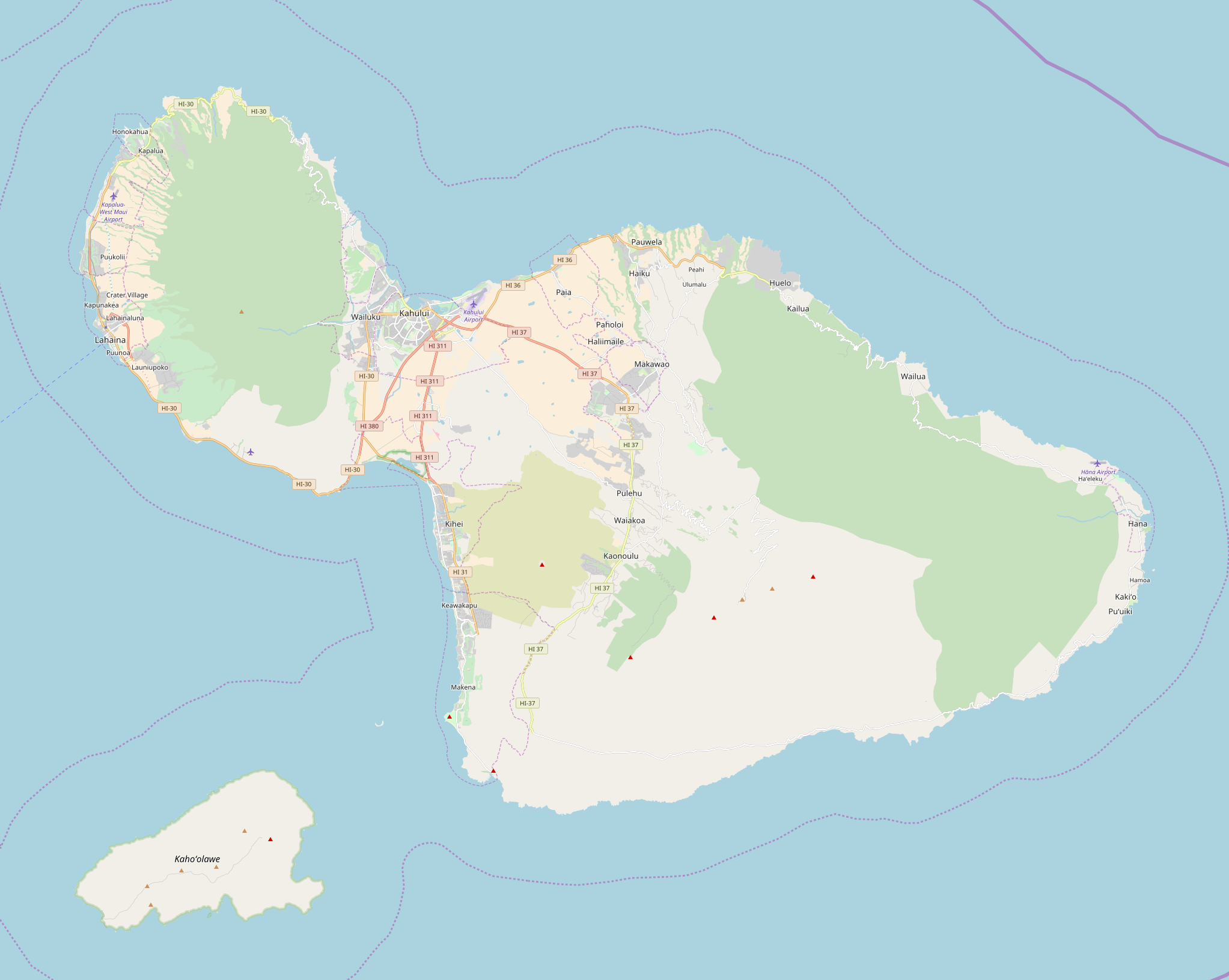
- Location within Maui Location within Hawaii
- Location: 955 Baldwin Avenue; Paia, HI 96779
- Coordinates: 20°54′11″N 156°21′24″W
- Area: 9.954 acres (4.028 ha)
- Built: 1909
- Architect: William D'Esmond
- Architectural style: Classical Revival
- MPS: Maui Public Schools MPS
- NRHP reference No.: 00000664
- HRHP No.: 50-50-04-01630

Significant dates
- Added to NRHP: August 22, 2000
- Designated HRHP: June 2, 1992

Pāʻia Elementary School is a public elementary school in Paia, Hawaii, operated by the Hawaii Department of Education (HIDOE). Its original building is listed in the National Register of Historic Places along with five other Maui elementary schools.

The school first opened in 1881 and its current campus opened in 1909. In 2019 the HIDOE had a proposal to build a two-story classroom building for programs to immerse students in the Hawaiian language. There would be eight classrooms inside.
