= Waihee Church =

Historic church in Hawaii, United States

- U.S. National Register of Historic Places
- Hawaiʻi Register of Historic Places
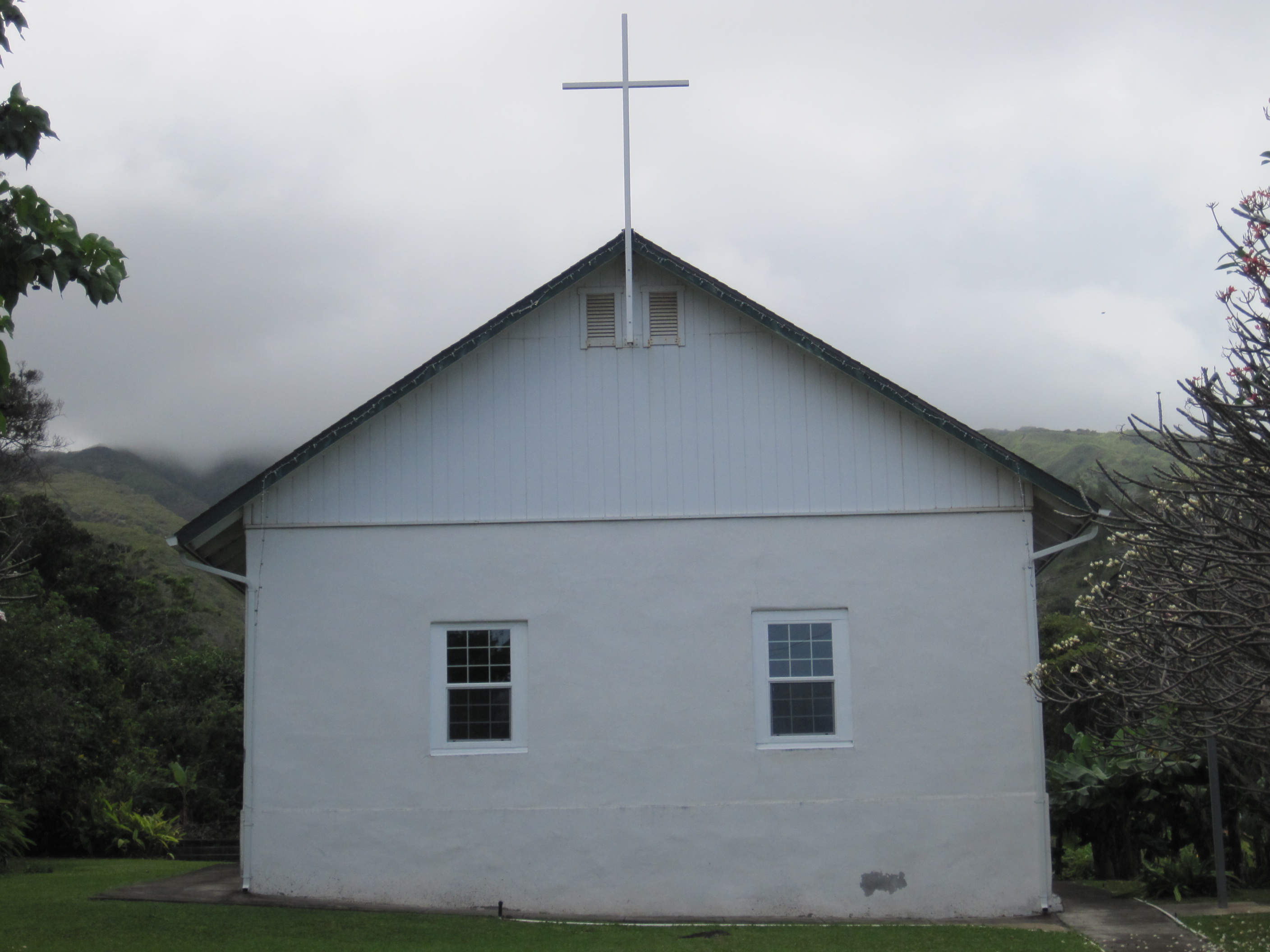

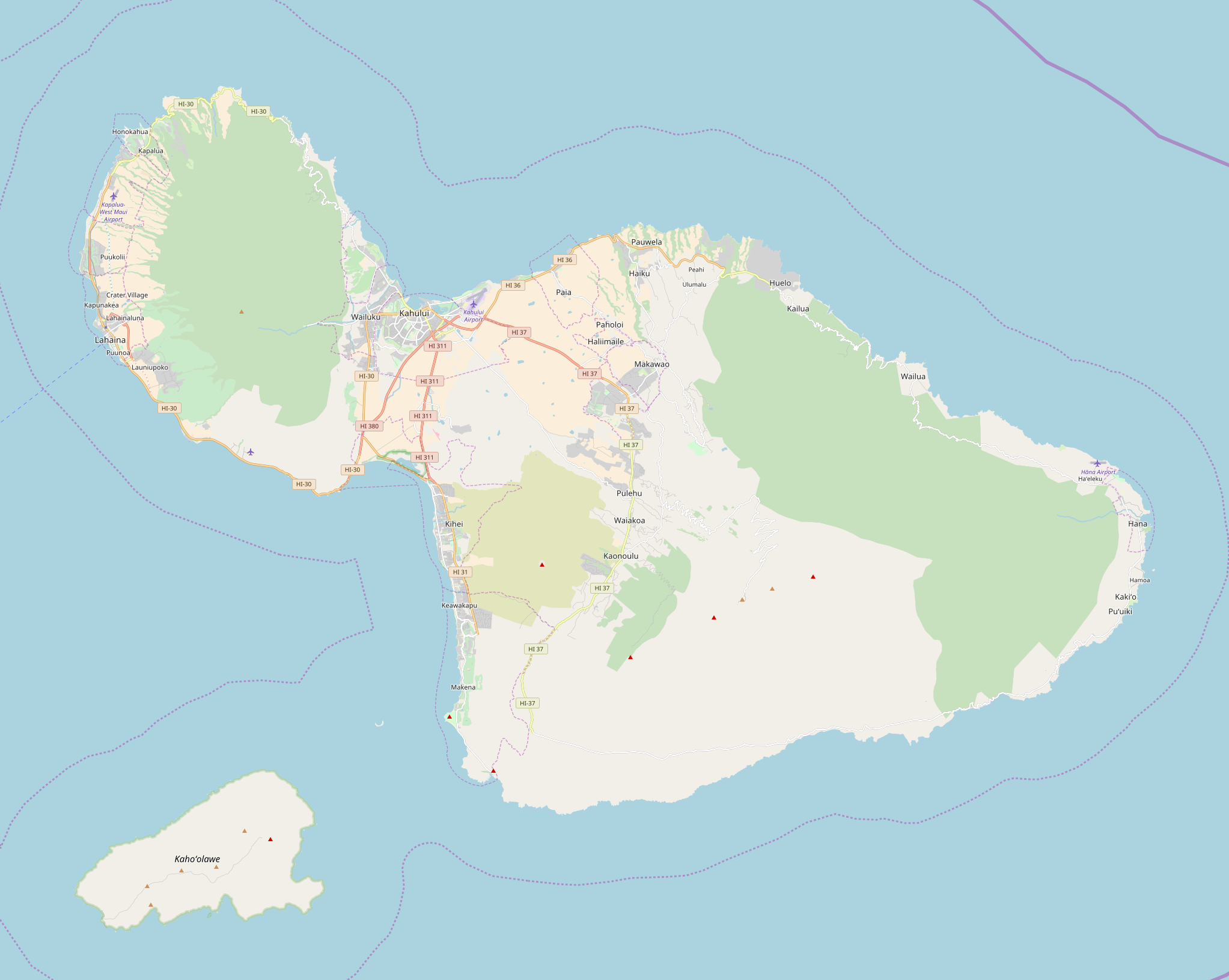
- Location within Maui Location within Hawaii
- Nearest city: Waihee, Hawaii
- Coordinates: 20°56′6″N 156°30′54″W
- Area: less than one acre
- Built: 1848
- NRHP reference No.: 94000384
- HRHP No.: 50-50-04-01619

Significant dates
- Added to NRHP: April 21, 1994
- Designated HRHP: June 2, 1992

Waihee Church (also known as Waihee Protestant Church) is a historic church in Waihee, Hawaii, United States. The church began construction in 1848 and was finished ten years later in 1858. It is located on a small parcel heavily planted with trees and flowers in the plantation town of Waihee.

The church was established for Waihee's missionary congregation. Johnathan S. Green had built a thatch and pole meeting house on the present site in 1830. Early records indicated that between 100 and 300 Hawaiians attended the early meetings. The church became an official branch of the Kaahumanu Church in Wailuku in 1868.

The church building is significant for its architecture. It was built with lava rock and has a limestone foundation and wooden siding. A wooden bell tower originally topped the building; however, it was removed in 1987 due to termite and storm damage. In 1930, the church was devastated by a flash flood cascading from the mountains at the back of the church property. It is still standing today but most of the church records were destroyed. Waihee Church is a historic landmark and museum.

Over a hundred years later the church was added to the National Register of Historic Places in 1994.

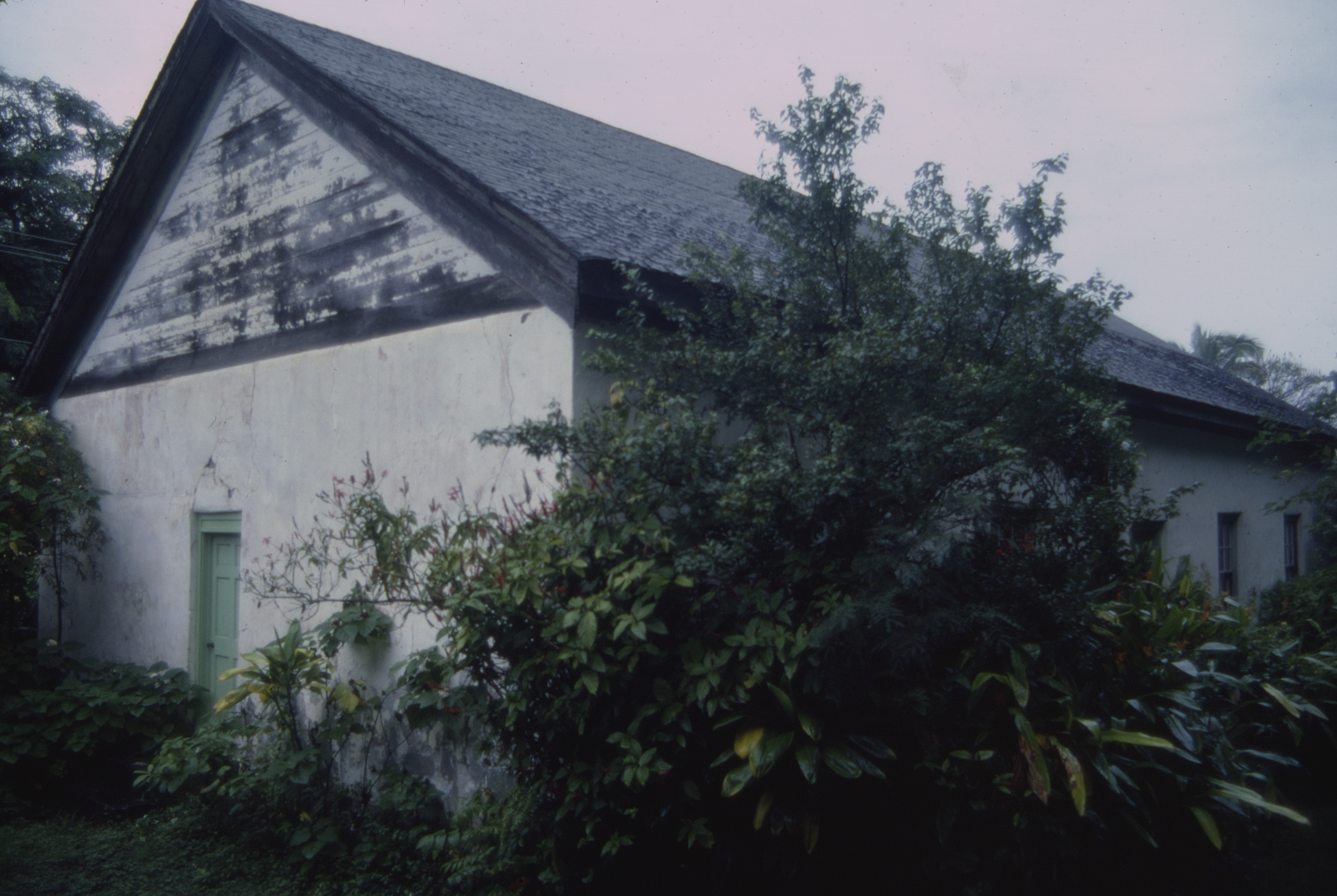
Exterior of Waihee Church. Photograph by Alan Gowans. National Gallery of Art Library.
