= Haraguchi Rice Mill =

- U.S. National Register of Historic Places
- Hawaiʻi Register of Historic Places
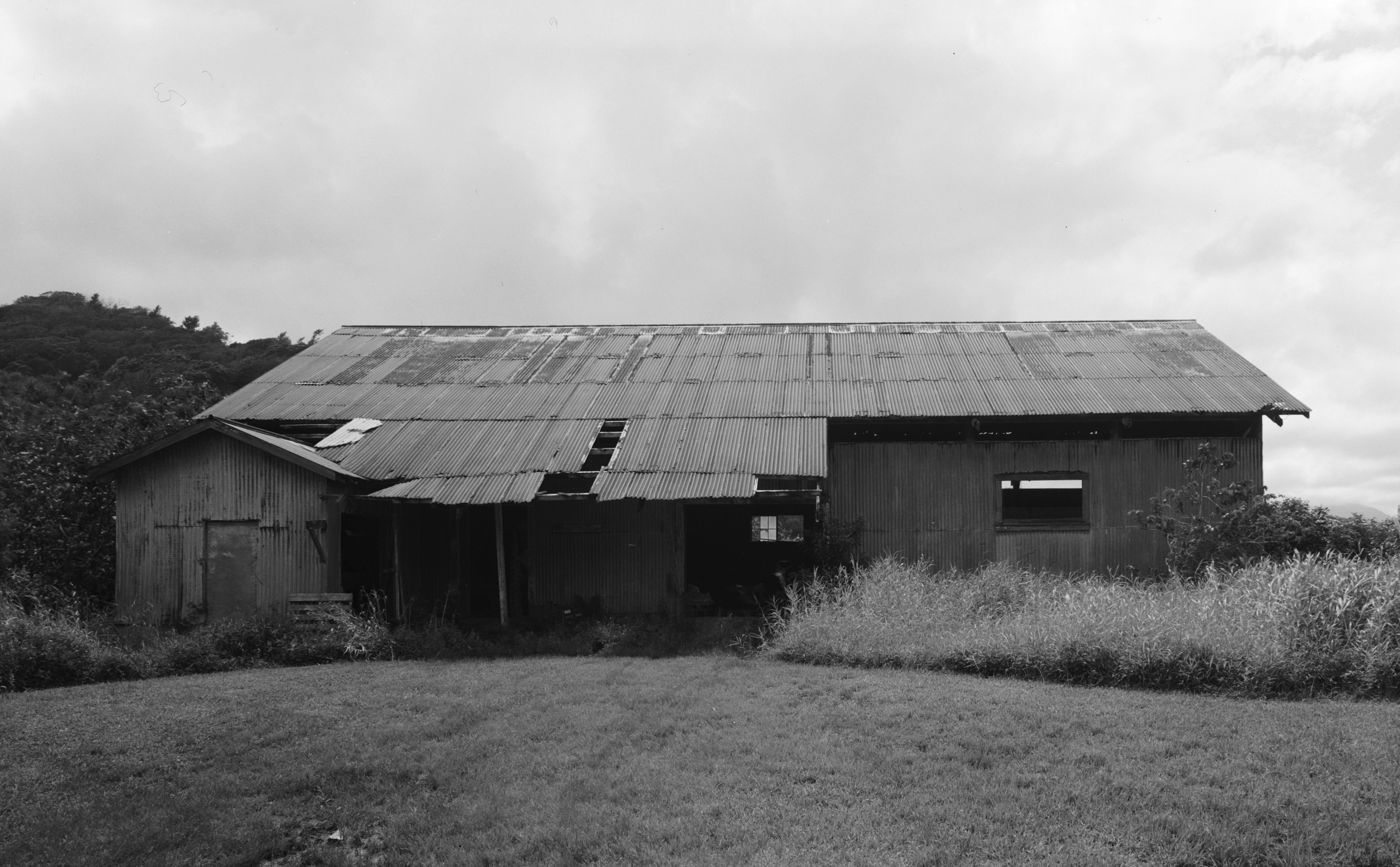

- Location within Hawaii
- Location: 4650 Ohiki Road, Hanalei, Hawaii
- Coordinates: 22°12′35″N 159°28′36″W
- Area: less than one acre
- Built: 1930
- NRHP reference No.: 83000252
- HRHP No.: 50-30-03-09385

Significant dates
- Added to NRHP: August 25, 1983
- Designated HRHP: June 27, 1983

The Haraguchi Rice Mill, on Ohiki Road in Hanalei, Hawaii, on Kauaʻi, is one of five former rice mills in Hanalei Valley. It was built in 1930 and was a corrugated iron structure on a concrete pad. It is listed on the National Register of Historic Places. It was listed on the National Register in 1983; the listing included one contributing structure and four contributing objects. The listing was shortly after 1982 Hurricane Iwa had collapsed the rice mill structure. Heavy machinery including an engine were not significantly harmed, however, and it was then thought that the structure could be restored.

== Origin ==
The majority of the extraordinary buildings in the community Hanalei of Hawaii were built during the rice era started in the 1860s. This was a farming area where there were mostly flat lands and agriculture was the main industry, there were crops like tobacco, coffee, and sugarcane. In 1884 there was an increase in Chinese farmers, who started leasing lands which made rice become the main economic crop eventually. The Haraguchi Rice Farm was founded in Hanalei by Ine and Tomijiro Haraguchi. Along with being the largest rice farmers, they also took part in fishing the water of Hanalei Bay. The Haraguchi Rice Mill was reconstructed in 1930. It was a one-room shack that had sections for milling, and engine operation and an area for the storage of processed and unprocessed rice. It had an apex-style metal roof. The Haraguchi Rice Mill was shut down in 1960, which made it the last mill out of the five rice mills to be closed in Hawaii. This was due to competition from the United States and damage done by the rice birds, which eventually made the Haraguchi Rice Mill unprofitable.

== Rice production in Hanalei ==
Approximately 4 months after planting rice is ready to be harvested. The rice farmers in Hanalei did not have much time to rest, they planted rice all year round and when the work got intensive farmers would pool together and help each other. The rice seeds were planted into seedbeds and incorporated with organic manure 3 inches high, within several days the seeds germinate into seedlings. The most prominent rice pest in Hanalei was the Chinese Sparrow, also called the Nutmeg Manikins. They would drank the milk from the rice as it matured and ate the kernels as well. These birds had to be scared away by cans filled with stone which made noise as they pitched on the strings connecting them. The Hanalei River running through the Hanalei Valley made agricultural production more feasible due to the readily available water supply. This river was available to almost everyone on this Pacific island because of its heavy flow of fresh water.

== Hawaii rice economy ==
The Haraguchi Rice Mill played a huge role in the agricultural history of Hanalei. Rice was first cultivated on the island by the Chinese first and taken over by the Japanese years after. In 1879 farmers were getting approximately $15 to $18 per bag. The Japanese rice was planted mainly for home consumption, while the Chinese rice was exported or shipped elsewhere.

== Natural disasters ==
The Haraguchi Rice Mill was rebuilt in 1930 after it was destroyed by a fire in March of that year. Following this disaster, in 1959 Hurricane Dot damaged the roof and air vent of the milling machine at the Haraguchi Rice Mill. Then in 1982 the mill was massively destroyed by Hurricane Iwa in the month of November. The whole milling house collapsed onto the milling machine which was safe and ready to mill again. In 1992 Hurricane Iniki passed over this disaster prone farm site once again.

== Legacy ==
The Haraguchi Rice Mill was the fifth rice mill in Hanalei of Hawaii. It impacted families and communities in and around the island. Even though it has gone through many disasters during its time of maximum production, Haraguchi Rice Mill contributed to the islands economy where it provided jobs, increased foreign exchange earnings and established rice as a staple food for the Chinese and Japanese farmers. Today the farm has no rice on it but instead it has taro and it is a non-profit business that is facilitates personal development for schools and offer back to nature visits. This farm now makes traditional dishes freshly from taro, which is harvested straight off the farm. It still embraces its originality and traditional values in 2019.

Currently the Haraguchi Farm is still own today by the Haraguchi family sixth generation, this farm is going over 100 year old. On the farm presently they have taro production; also this farm in Hanalei, Hawaii is utilized as a back to nature tour, where it's a non-profit entity. The Haraguchi Farm is now used to serve the Hawaii Island as a recreational center for tours such as schools and other tourists, in the same breathe Hawaiian students are train how to grow and harvest taro. Taro cultivation also supports small businesses in and around the community of Hanalei. From taro the by-products and other ancient dishes are made, which as a lucrative market within the community. Today the Haraguchi Family Farm is still in progress.
