= Fred C. Baldwin Memorial Home =

Historic house in Hawaii, United States

- U.S. National Register of Historic Places
- Hawaiʻi Register of Historic Places
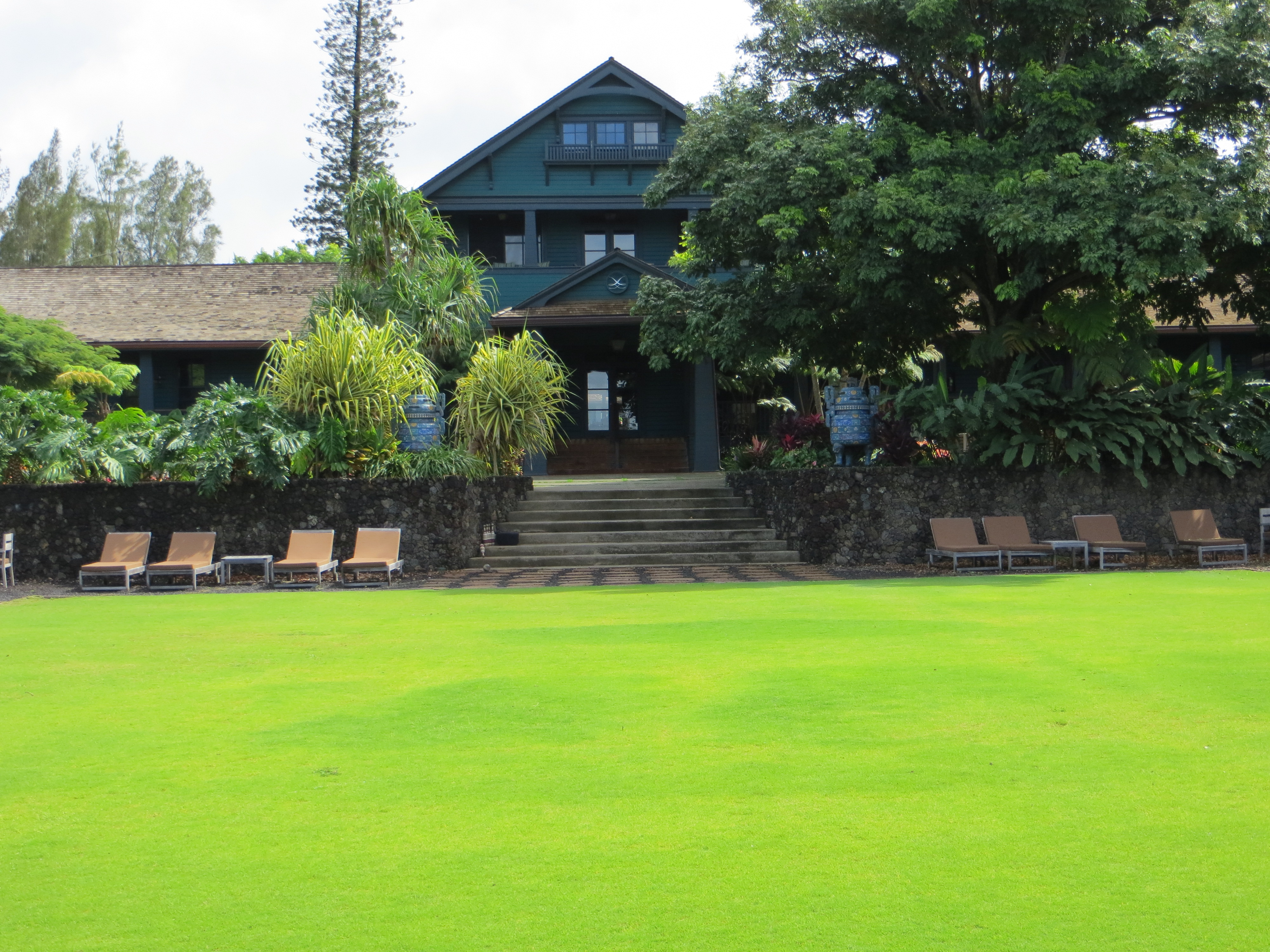
- View from center lawn

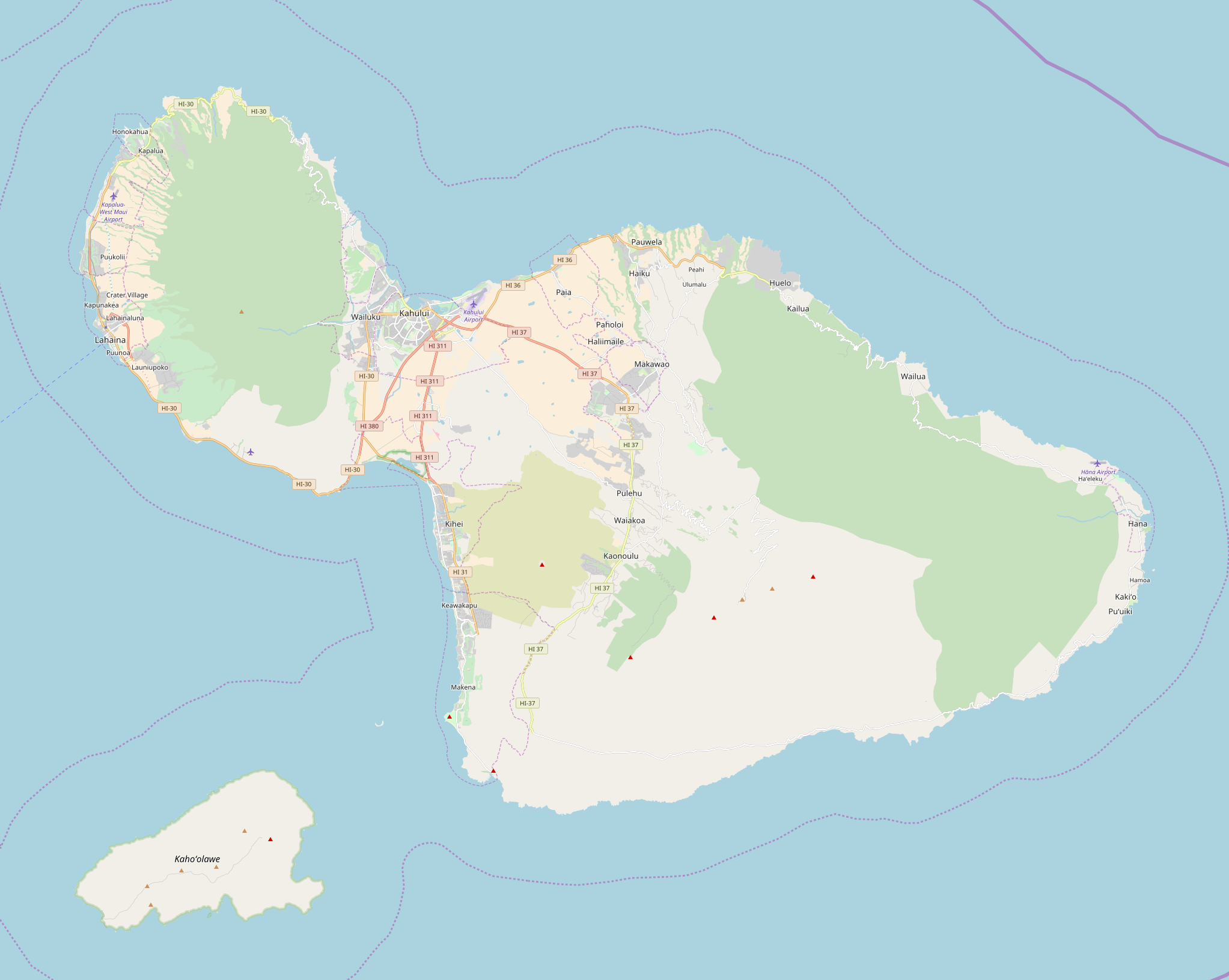
- Location within Maui Location within Hawaii
- Location: 1813 Baldwin Ave.
- Nearest city: Makawao, Hawaii
- Coordinates: 20°53′12″N 156°20′43″W
- Architect: H. L. Kerr
- NRHP reference No.: 11000437
- HRHP No.: 50-50-05-09092

Significant dates
- Added to NRHP: 1 December 2011
- Designated HRHP: 1 December 2011

The Fred Baldwin Memorial Home was built in 1910 and endowed by Emily and Henry Perrine Baldwin to provide housing for elderly Hawaiian and haole men. It is named for their son Fred Baldwin (1881-1905). Its architect was H. L. Kerr, who had earlier designed the Old Wailuku Courthouse. In 2011, it was restored by Xorin Balbes to operate as an educational retreat named Lumeria Maui. It was added to the National Register of Historic Places on 1 December 2011.

== History ==
Fred Chambers Baldwin, one of eight children of Emily and Henry P. Baldwin, had graduated from Yale University in 1903, then returned to Maui and to manage Ha‘ikū and Grove ranches. He died at age 24 while visiting relatives in New York, after falling ill and undergoing surgery for appendicitis. Fred was "handsome and charismatic," the most popular of his siblings, and had aspired to manage Haleakala Ranch. Many people lined the roads as his coffin was carried from Kahului Harbor up to the family home at Olinda.

Many of the early residents were veterans of World War I and are buried in nearby Makawao Cemetery. During World War II, they were moved to the Pioneer Inn in Lahaina and the facility was converted to a military hospital until war's end. For most of its existence, from 1911 to 1958, the home was run by Ethel Baldwin, the wife of Fred's brother Henry Alexander Baldwin, and their daughter Frances, who married J. Walter Cameron of Maui Pineapple Company.

After 1958, the buildings provided dormitory space for Maunaolu Seminary. Then Maui Land & Pineapple Company bought the property and housed summer workers there from 1982 until the 1990s. After that, the buildings remained unused until 2009, when they were purchased by SoulSpace Ranch, who undertook the renovation.

== Architecture ==
In 1910–1911, Kahului Railroad Company construction crews built the original five buildings in a U-shaped plan around a central lawn and landscape garden. The wooden buildings reflect a primarily American Craftsman style, but with some Neo-classical and vernacular Japanese details. Although the buildings had fallen into disuse, the 2010-2011 renovation was able to preserve much of the original structure and detail.

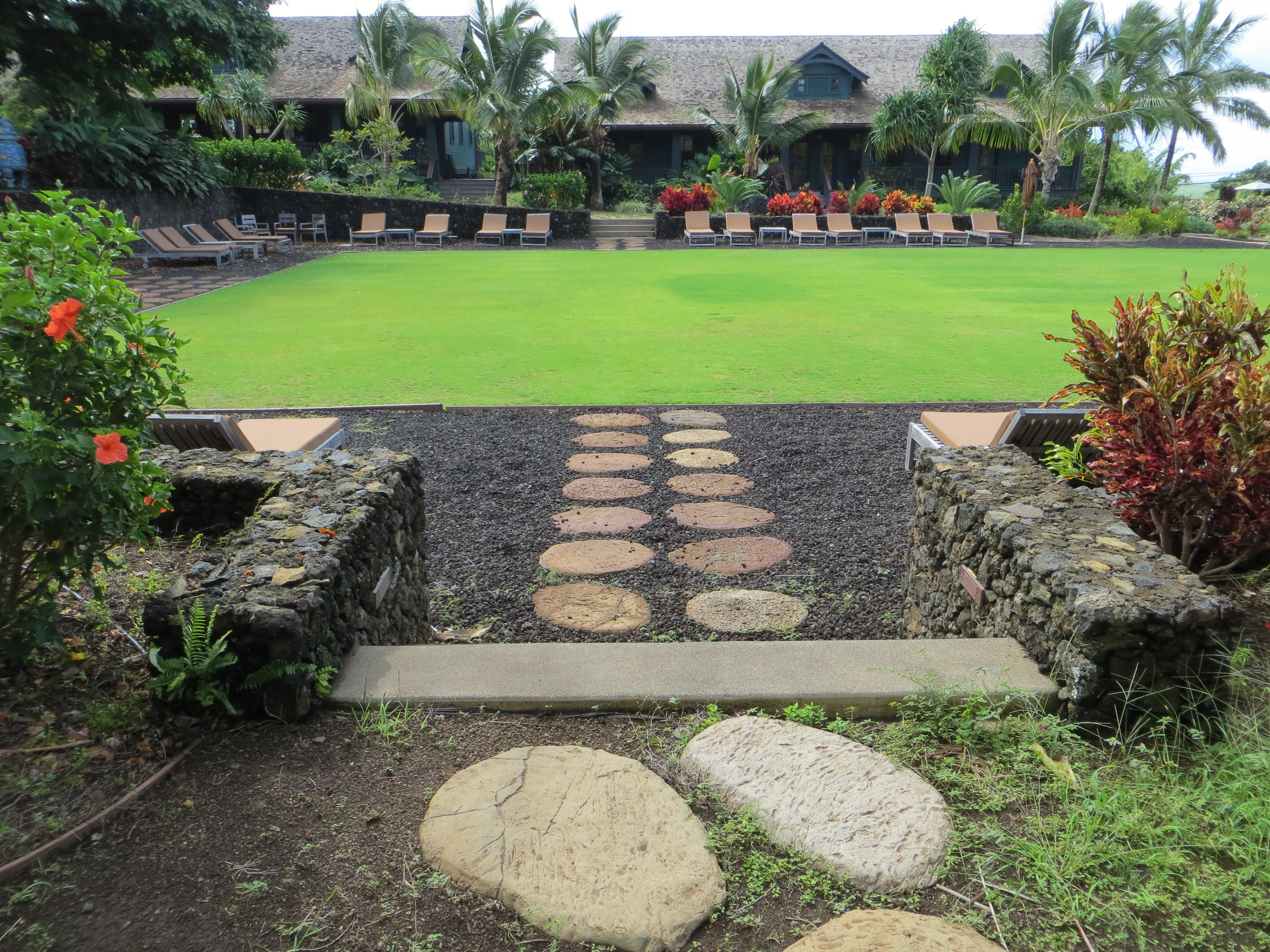
View across center lawn

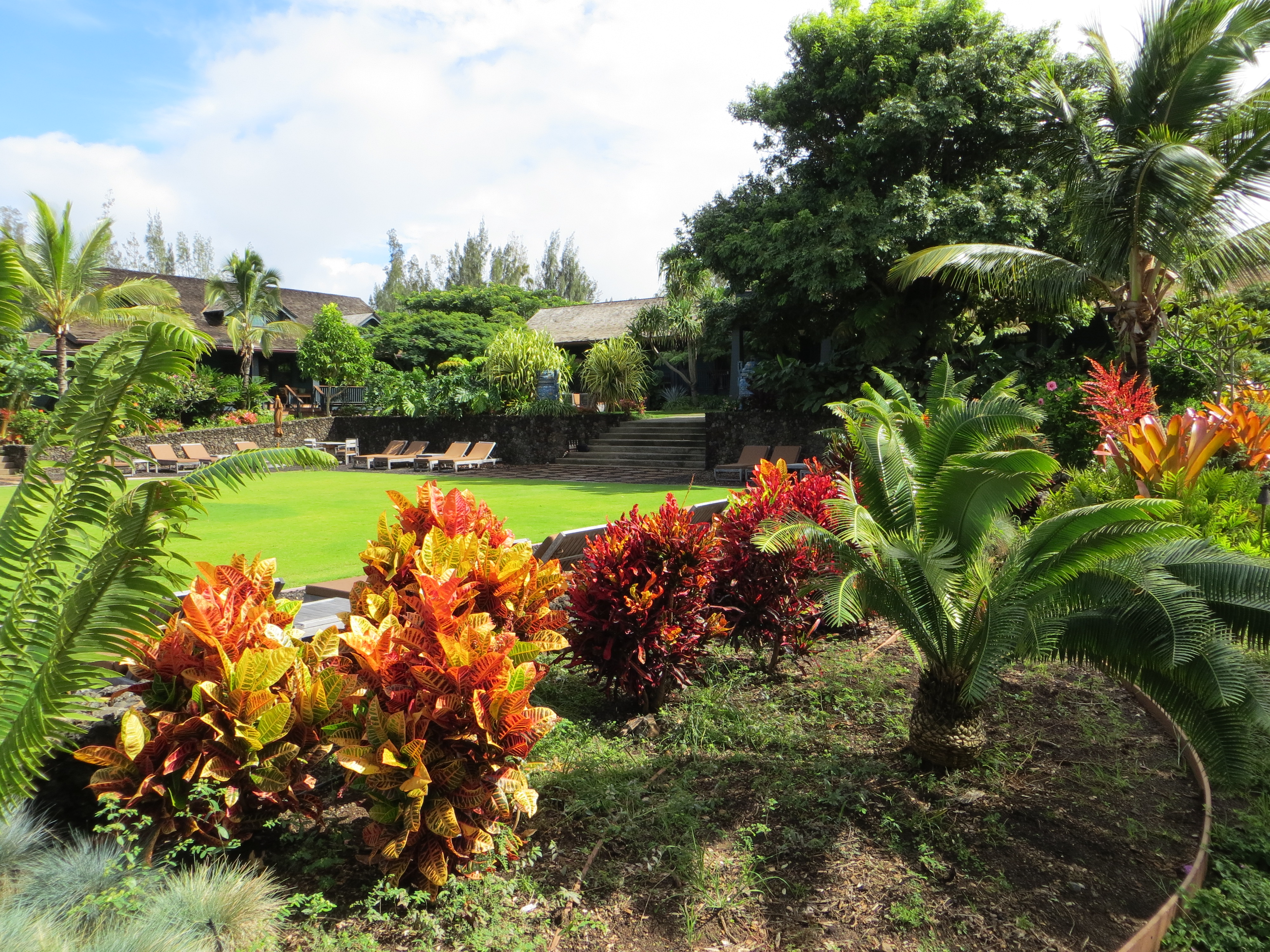
Landscape garden around lawn

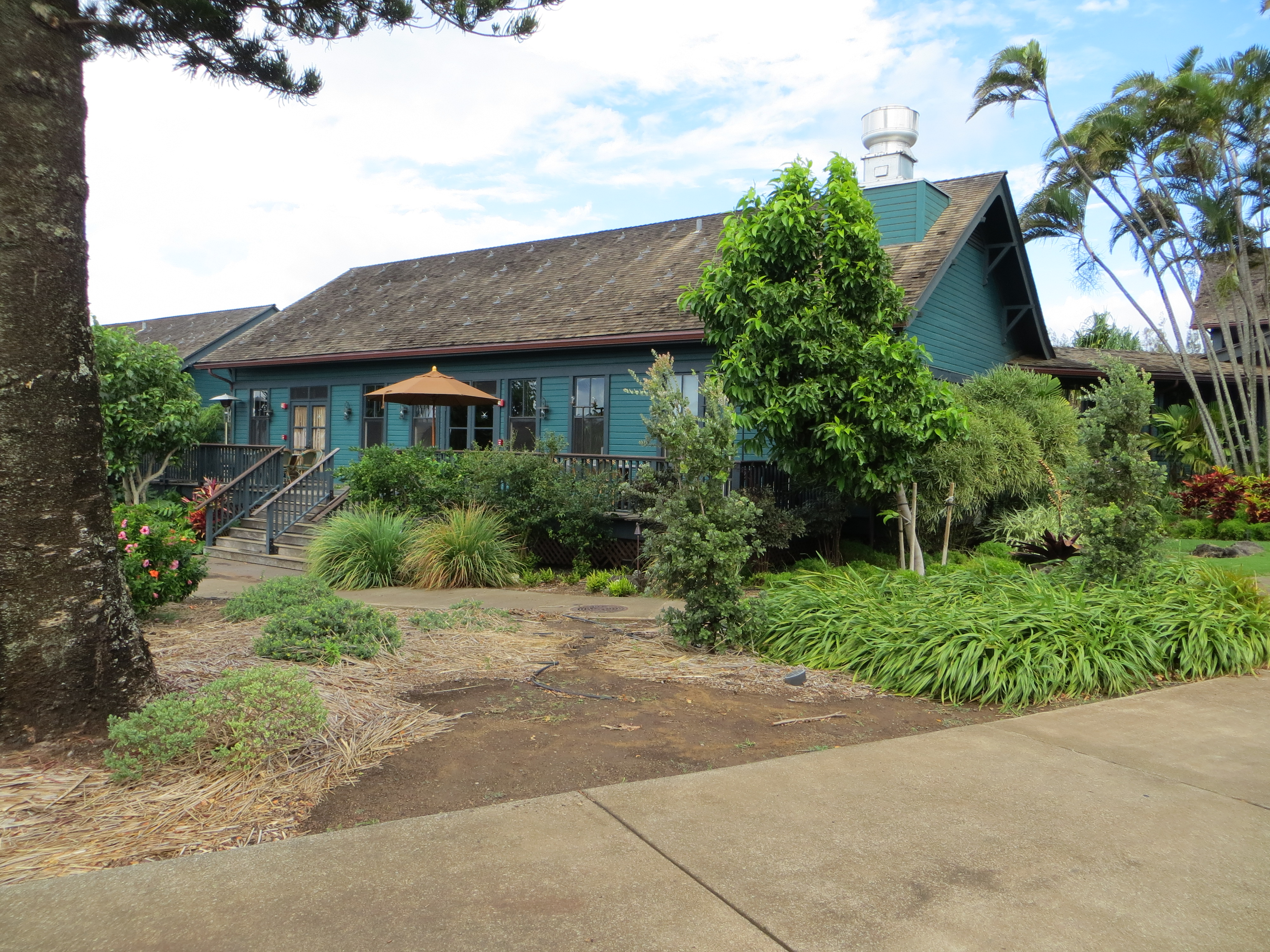
Store building near entrance

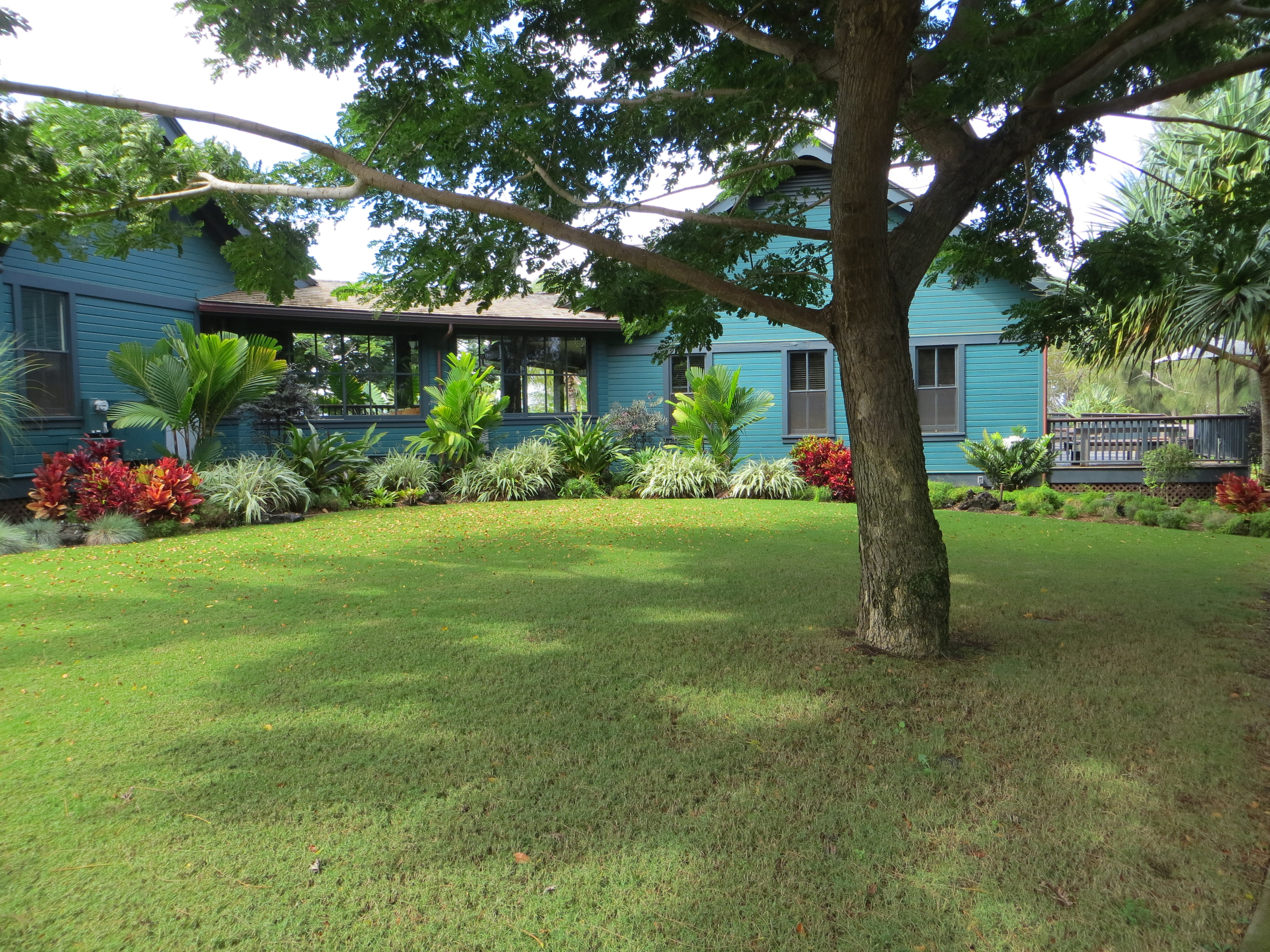
Covered walkway and rear deck

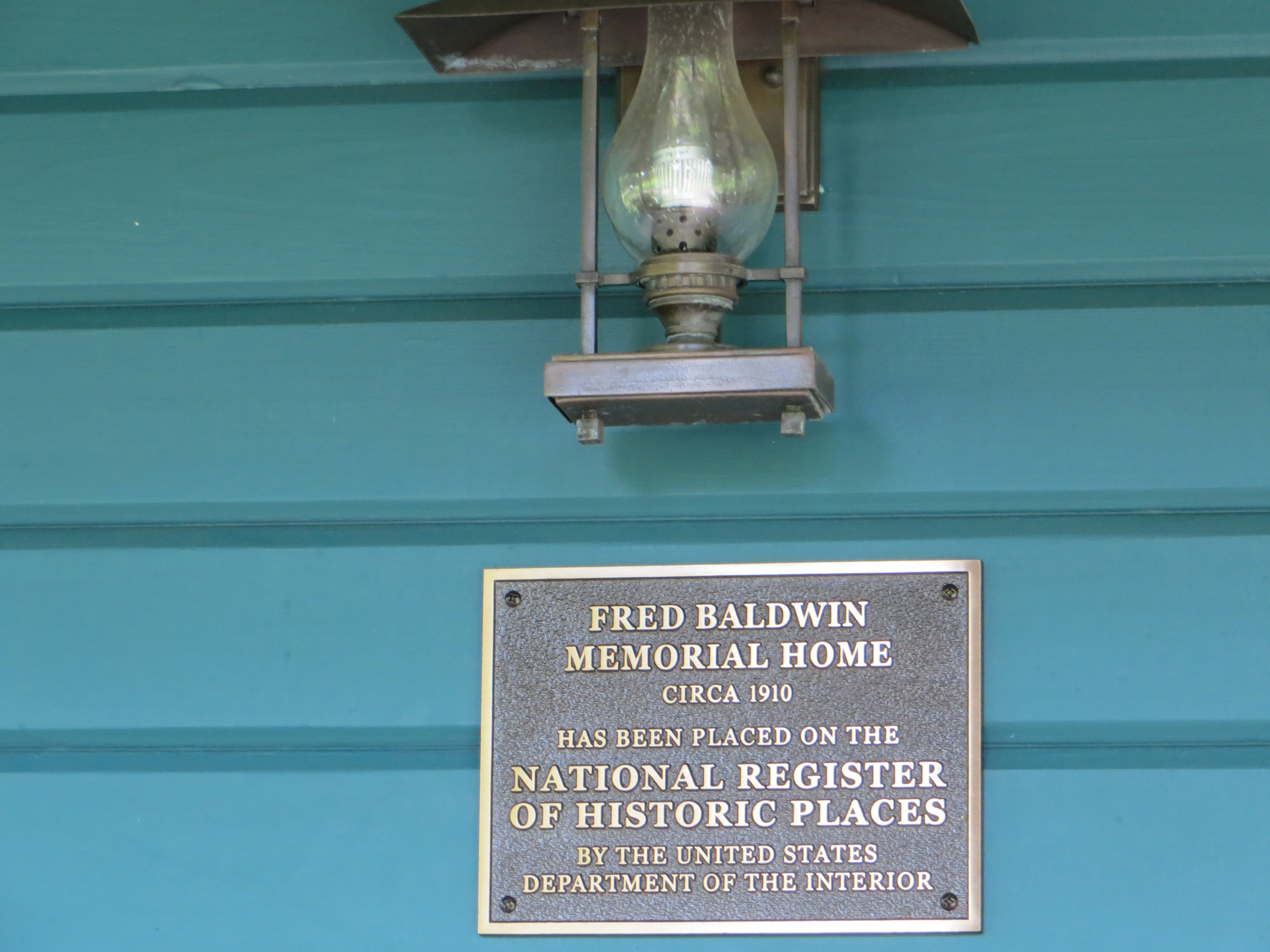
NRHP plaque

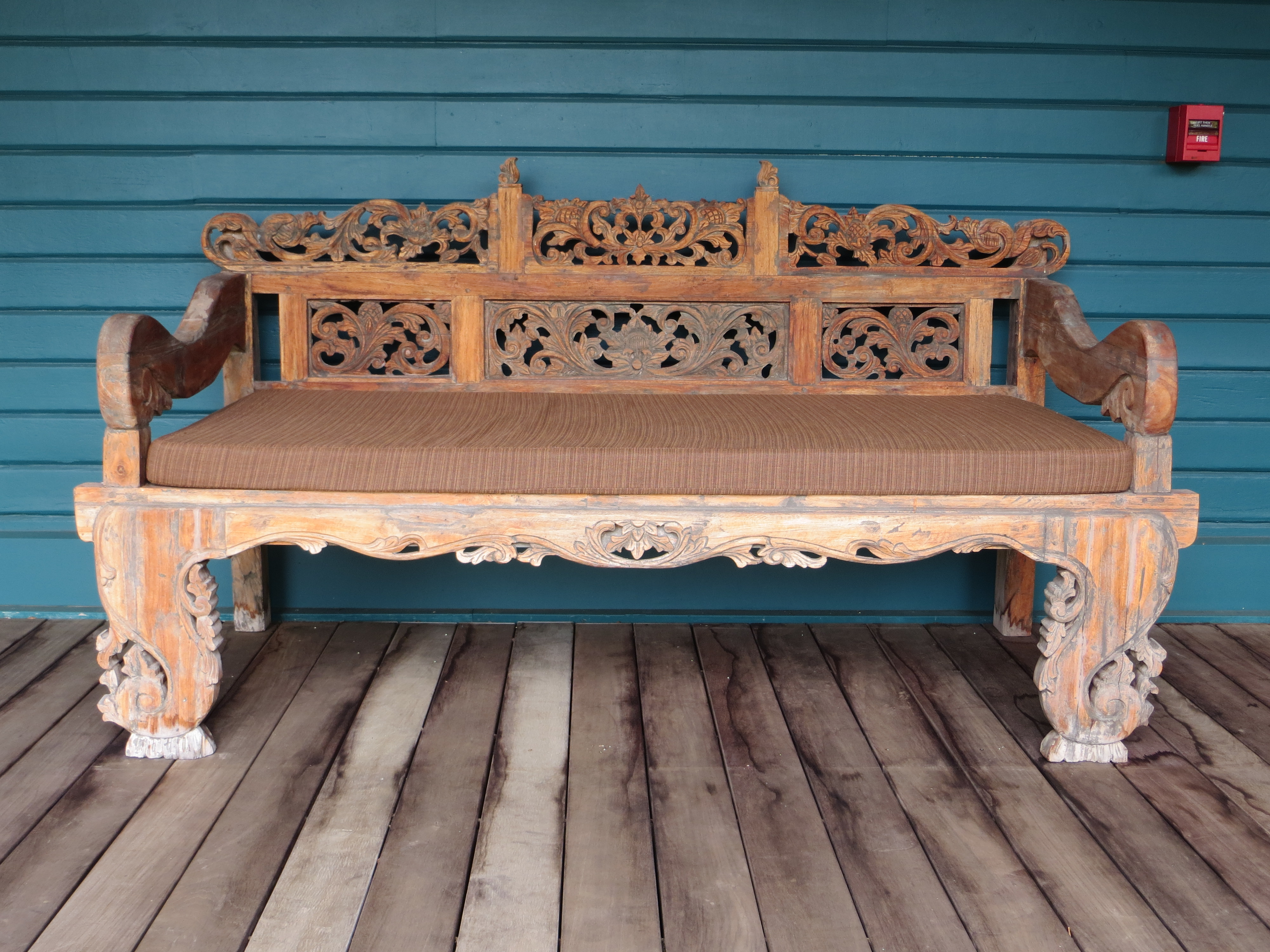
Wooden bench on covered porch

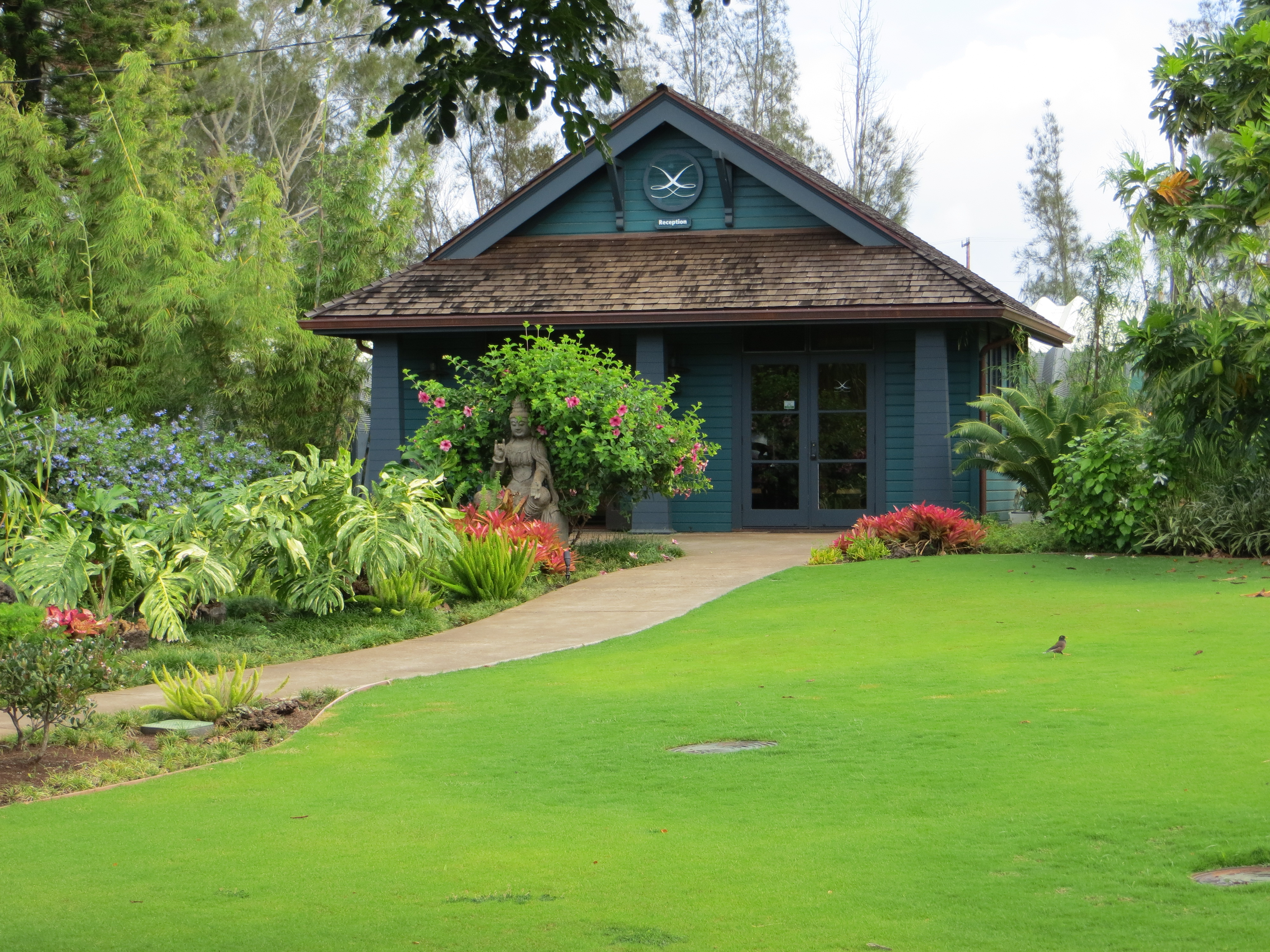
Reception building

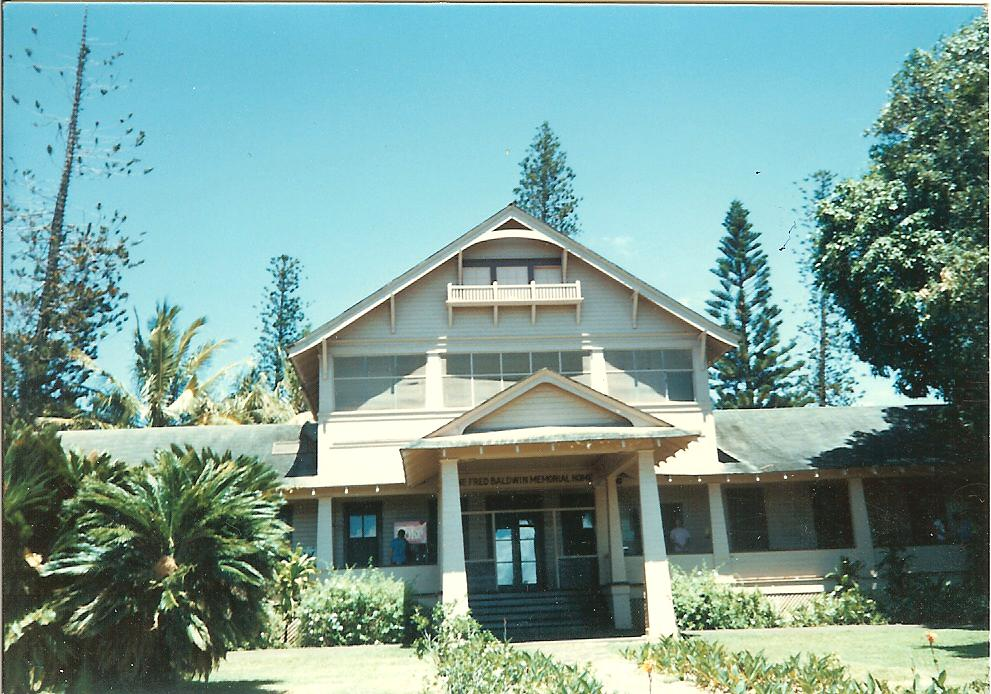
Fred Baldwin Memorial Home 1987
