= Charles Gay House =

Historic house in Hawaii, United States

- U.S. National Register of Historic Places
- Hawaiʻi Register of Historic Places
- Location within Hawaii
- Location: 9684 Gay Road; Waimea, Kauaʻi, Hawaii
- Coordinates: 21°58′26″N 159°39′46″W
- Area: 2.5 acres (1.0 ha)
- Built: 1895
- Built by: Charles Gay
- NRHP reference No.: 84000203
- HRHP No.: 50-30-09-09313

Significant dates
- Added to NRHP: November 1, 1984
- Designated HRHP: September 14, 1984

The Charles Gay House, on Gay Road in Waimea, Kauaʻi, Hawaii, was built in 1895. It has also been known as the Roland Gay Residence. It was listed on the Hawaiʻi Register of Historic Places and the National Register of Historic Places (NRHP) in 1984; the NRHP listing included three contributing buildings.
