= Gulick-Rowell House =

Historic house in Hawaii, United States

- U.S. National Register of Historic Places
- Hawaiʻi Register of Historic Places
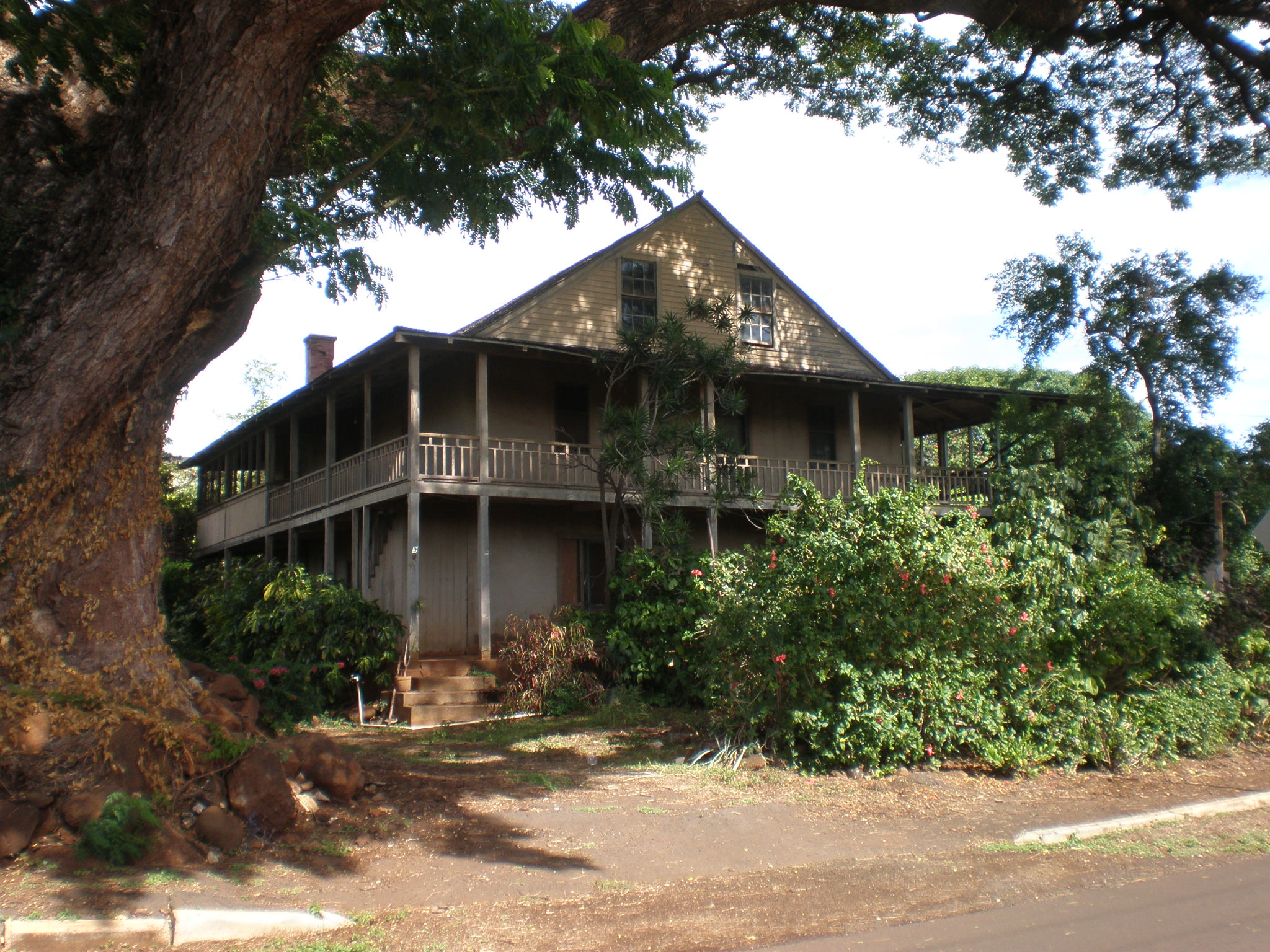
- Gulick-Rowell House in 2009

- Location within Hawaii
- Location: 9567 Huakai Road (Missionary Row), Waimea, Hawaii
- Coordinates: 21°57′41″N 159°40′19″W
- Area: 1.8 acres (0.73 ha)
- Built: 1829, 1846
- Built by: Gulick, Rev. Peter Thomas
- NRHP reference No.: 78001027
- HRHP No.: 50-30-05-09314

Significant dates
- Added to NRHP: April 15, 1978
- Designated HRHP: August 29, 1977

The Gulick-Rowell House, on Missionary Row in Waimea, on Kauaʻi, in Hawaii, is a historic house that is listed on the U.S. National Register of Historic Places. It is located across from Waimea Canyon Middle School, on way to Kauaʻi Veterans Memorial Hospital, first built 1829 by Rev. Peter Johnson Gulick, completed by Rev. George Rowell in 1846.

It was built of coral limestone cut from reefs offshore and floated in.

It was listed on the Hawaiʻi Register of Historic Places in 1977 and on the National Register of Historic Places in 1978.
