= Seto Building =

- U.S. National Register of Historic Places
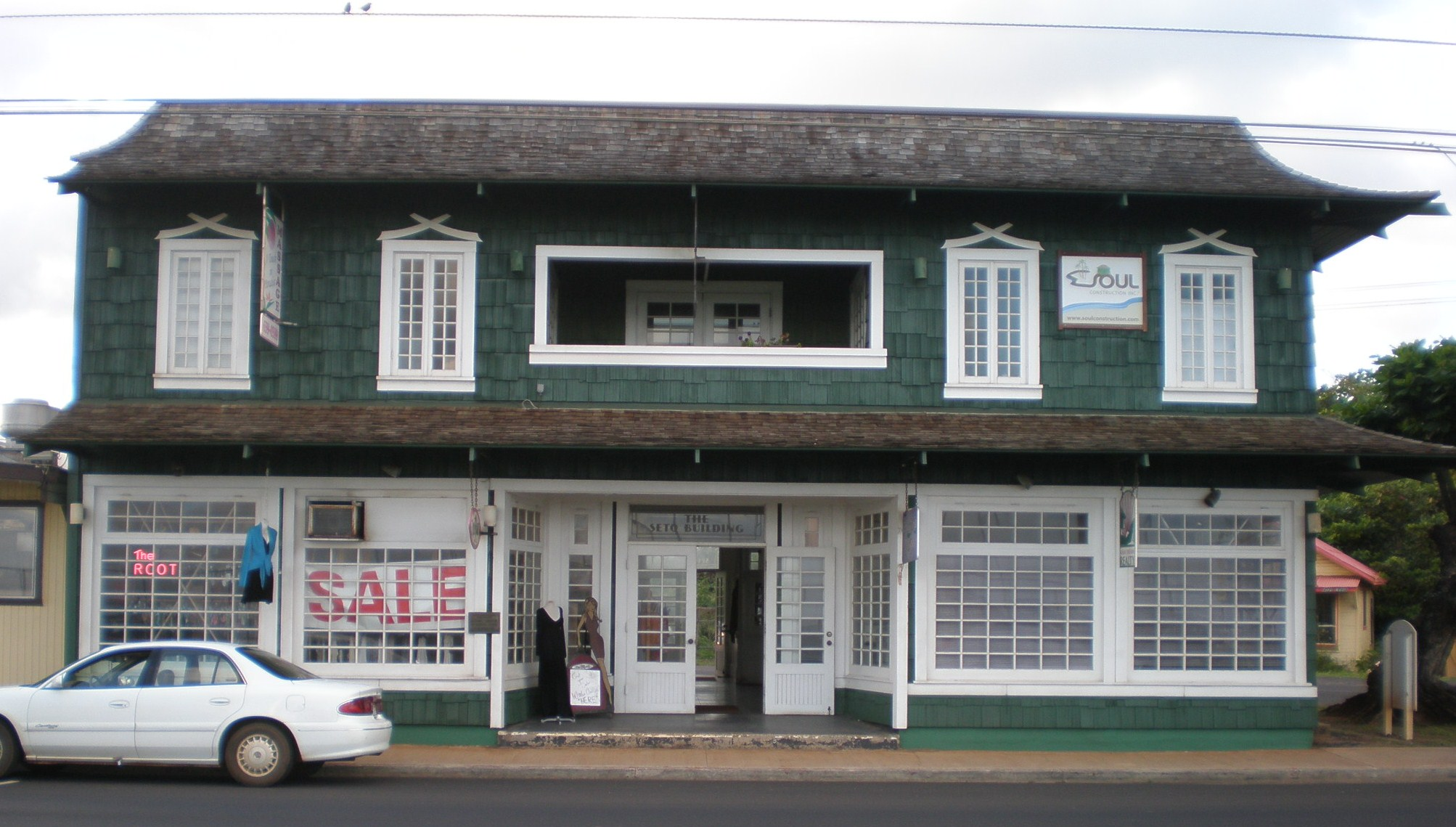
- Seto Building in 2009

- Location within Hawaii
- Location: 4-1435 Kuhio Hwy., Kapa'a, Hawai'i
- Coordinates: 22.07743°N 159.317°W
- Area: 3276 sq. ft.
- Built: 1929
- Architect: Robert Brooks Taylor
- NRHP reference No.: 79000758
- Added to NRHP: 4 September 1979

The Seto Building at 4-1435 Kuhio Highway in Kapaʻa, Kauaʻi, was earlier known as the Quality Market and then the Big Save Building. It was built in 1929 to serve as the first general food market on the island of Kauaʻi, with the latest refrigeration methods to store a variety of fresh meat and produce. Its owner, Ah Doi Seto, had immigrated from China in 1888 to work on a sugarcane plantation, but later left the plantation to open a business in bustling Kapaʻa. The building is significant as an unusual example of modern commercial architecture with Chinese design elements, but also as a forerunner of contemporary supermarkets. It was listed on the National Register of Historic Places in 1979.
