= Kakahaiʻa National Wildlife Refuge =

Protected wetland habitat in Moloka'i, Hawaii

- IUCN category IV (habitat/species management area)
- Location within Hawaii
- Location: Molokaʻi, Hawaii, United States
- Nearest city: Kaunakakai, Hawaii
- Coordinates: 21.06722°N 156.94444°W
- Area: 44 acres (0.18 km^{2})
- Established: 1977
- Governing body: U.S. Fish and Wildlife Service
- Website: Kakahaia National Wildlife Refuge

Kakahaiʻa National Wildlife Refuge (NWR) was established in 1977 to permanently protect wetland habitat for endangered endemic waterbirds and wintering migratory wetland birds and to maintain the structural integrity of an ancient Hawaiian fishpond.

== Location ==
The 44-acre (18 ha) refuge is located along the south coast of Molokaʻi island in the Hawaiian Islands. It contains a 15-acre (6.1 ha) coastal freshwater marsh, a remnant of an ancient Hawaiian fishpond. The spring-fed pond lies on a narrow plain just above sea level at the foot of volcanic hills. An additional 5.5-acre (22,000 m^{2}) managed impoundment constructed in 1983 provides shallow-water habitat for wading birds. Kamehameha V Highway (State Route 450) bisects the southern part of the refuge, allowing access to the coastal portion managed as a park by the County of Maui.

== Wildlife and habitat ==
The refuge is home to 12 known species of birds, including the endangered Hawaiian stilt and Hawaiian coot. Migratory ducks, and shorebirds, as well as invasive mammals such as feral cats, dogs, mongooses, and axis deer, are also present on the refuge.

The Pacific golden plover is the most common shorebird with the winter months hosting northern pintails.

== Public use ==
Public access is limited to the shoreline on Kamehameha V Highway. This seaward portion of the Refuge is for picnicking and fishing along the ocean beach. The interior portion of the refuge is available for environmental education programs through special use permits. The refuge has an active volunteer group.

== Management activities ==
Since over 90% of the plants in the refuge are aggressive introduced species, such as Indian marsh fleabane and California bulrush, native plants became scarce. Exotic plants quickly take over, having an adverse effect on wildlife. For example, four of the five waterbirds have been classified as endangered.

Refuge goals are to support recovery and perpetuation of endangered species, especially Hawaiian waterbirds. The United States Fish and Wildlife Service controls predators and water levels, especially during nesting season.

== See also ==
- Archeological Sites at Kawela — within the Kakahaia National Wildlife Refuge.
