= Archeological Sites at Kawela =

Archeological sites in Hawaii

Archeological Sites at Kawela are a number of archeological sites at or near the settlement of Kawela on the southern coast of Molokaʻi, the northernmost of the islands of Maui County, Hawaii. It was the site of two battles in Hawaiian history.

Location of Molokaʻi within the Hawaiian Islands

== Early history ==
Ka Wela means "the heat" in the Hawaiian language. It was the name of a traditional land division (ahupuaʻa) of ancient Hawaii, but the name is also used on several other islands.

It is located about 4.5 miles (7.2 km) east of the town of Kaunakakai. A heiau is visible at 21°4′39″N 156°56′40″W on a ridge between the forks of Kawela Gulch.

This is generally thought to be the place of refuge (Puʻuhonua) where the soldiers of Kapiʻioho o kalani fled during a great battle of about 1737.

In about February 1795, women and children escaped to Molokaʻi when Kamehameha I had just conquered Maui. In pursuit, the vast fleet of war canoes stretched all along the coast from Kawela past Kaunakakai to the area known as Kalamaʻula. The army met little resistance this time.

In the late 19th century it was part of the vast Molokaʻi Ranch owned by King Kamehameha V and managed by the family of Rudolph Wilhelm Meyer.

== Recent history ==
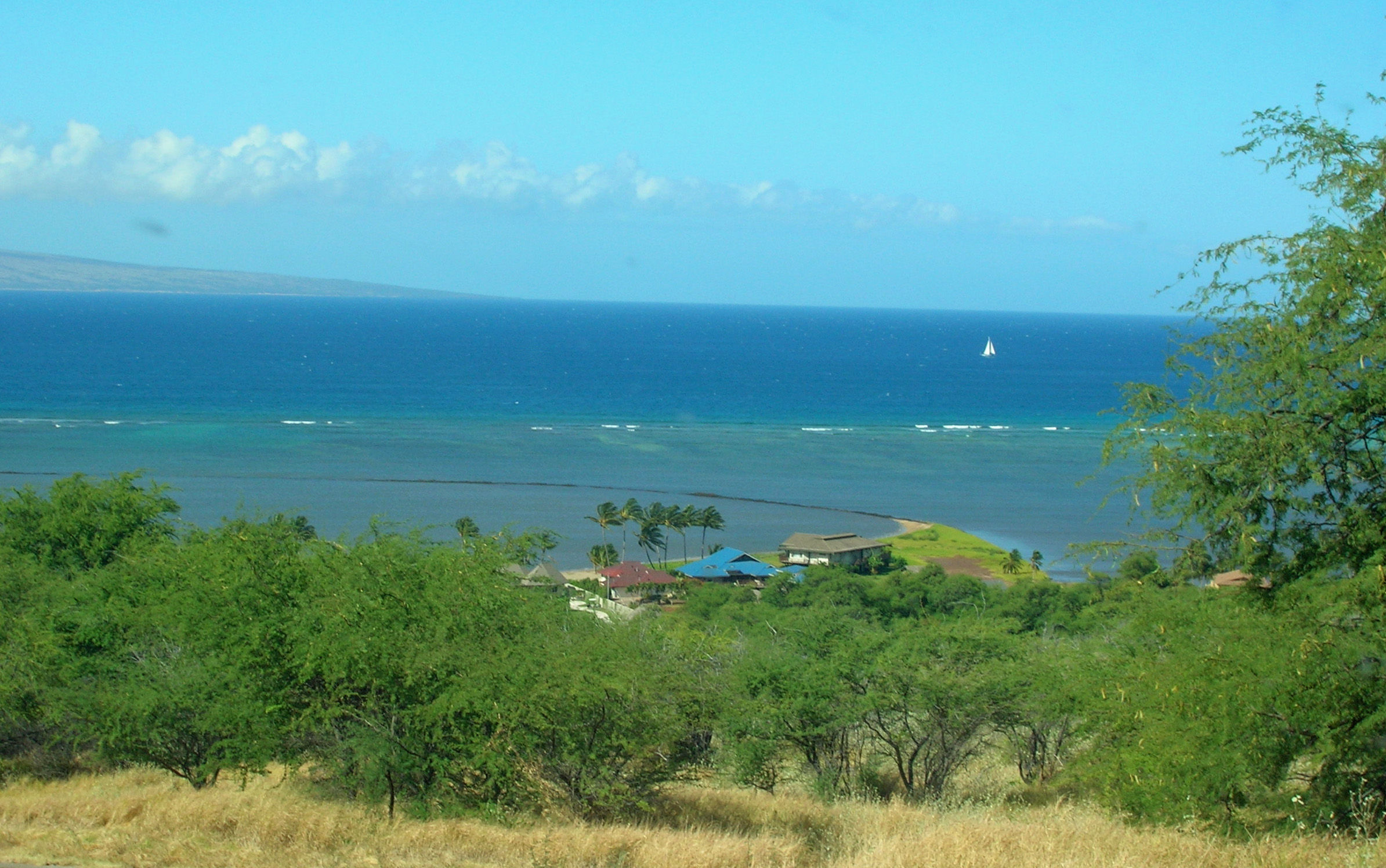
Kawela lies across a narrow channel to Lānaʻi island

The area now has a few vacation homes along the shore, and one subdivision of 120 2-acre (8,100 m^{2}) lots that are zoned for agriculture on the hills. Wadsworth Y. H. Yee, in the Hawaii Senate from the Republican Party of Hawaii proposed the development in the 1970s. Ground was broken on December 20, 1980.

Wetlands and an ancient fishpond near the shore are preserved in the Kakahaiʻa National Wildlife Refuge and Kakahaiʻa park administered by Maui County.

There are 21 which are separately listed on the National Register of Historic Places. The names used in the NRHP all start with the words "Archeological Site" and then an optional list of site numbers from a survey done by the Bernice Pauahi Bishop Museum when the development was proposed with a letter "T" followed by a dash, and then a state site identifier which four numbers separated with dashes, starting with "50-60" indicating the 50th state of Hawaii and the county of Maui County, a map quadrant, and site within the state registry. The sites are scattered through the area, and are located on private property so generally not accessible to the public.

The sites are:

Reference number	Survey sites	Date listed	State site	Area	Summary
82000152	T-10	November 3, 1982	50-60-04-702	0.2 acres (810 m^{2})	3 dwellings
82000163	T-108	November 5, 1982	50-60-03-713	4.5 acres (1.8 ha)	Agricultural fields
82000164	T-111-116; T-182	November 5, 1982	50-60-04-710	9 acres (3.6 ha)	7 burials
82000153	T-12	November 4, 1982	50-60-04-704	0.2 acres (810 m^{2})	Rock carving
82000165	T-125-6; T-181	November 5, 1982	50-60-03-714	3.9 acres (1.6 ha)	25 buildings and agricultural sites
82000166	T-134	November 5, 1982	50-60-03-718	0.5 acres (0.20 ha)	Dwellings and burials
82000167	T-135-6	November 5, 1982	50-60-03-719	0.6 acres (0.24 ha)	Building
82000168	T-155, -158	November 5, 1982	50-60-03-721	6.5 acres (2.6 ha)	11 religious structures
82000169	T-165-6	November 5, 1982	50-60-03-727	0.7 acres (0.28 ha)	2 buildings
82000154	T-19	November 4, 1982	50-60-04-705	0.1 acres (400 m^{2})	1 dwelling
82000150	T-5, T-122, T-178	November 3, 1982	50-60-04-142	0.9 acres (0.36 ha)	6 religious structures
82000157	T-57	November 4, 1982	50-60-03-720	5 acres (2.0 ha)	24 grave sites
82000151	T-6 complex	November 3, 1982	50-60-04-700	1.6 acres (0.65 ha)	12 structures
82000158	T-76	November 4, 1982	50-60-03-724	0.5 acres (0.20 ha)	6 domestic structures
82000170	T-78	November 4, 1982	50-60-03-723	0.2 acres (810 m^{2})	Religious structure
82000159	T-79	November 4, 1982	50-60-03-726	1 acre (0.40 ha)	7 domestic structures
82000160	T-81, -100, -101, -105, -142	November 4, 1982	50-60-03-717	1.4 acres (0.57 ha)	27 burials
82000161	T-88	November 4, 1982	50-60-04-707	0.5 acres (0.20 ha)	Religious structure
82000162	T-92	November 5, 1982	50-60-04-708	1.2 acres (0.49 ha)	7 domestic structures
82000155		November 3, 1982	50-60-04-140	0.9 acres (0.36 ha)	Place of refuge, Puʻuhonua
82000156		November 3, 1982	50-60-04-144	0.3 acres (1,200 m^{2})	Burial Mound and fishing site
82000174	T-20 and T-42-3	November 3, 1982	50-60-04-706	1.1 acres (0.45 ha)	Kamehameha V Wall
