= Hanapēpē Town Lot No. 18 =

Historic place in Hawaii, United States

- U.S. National Register of Historic Places
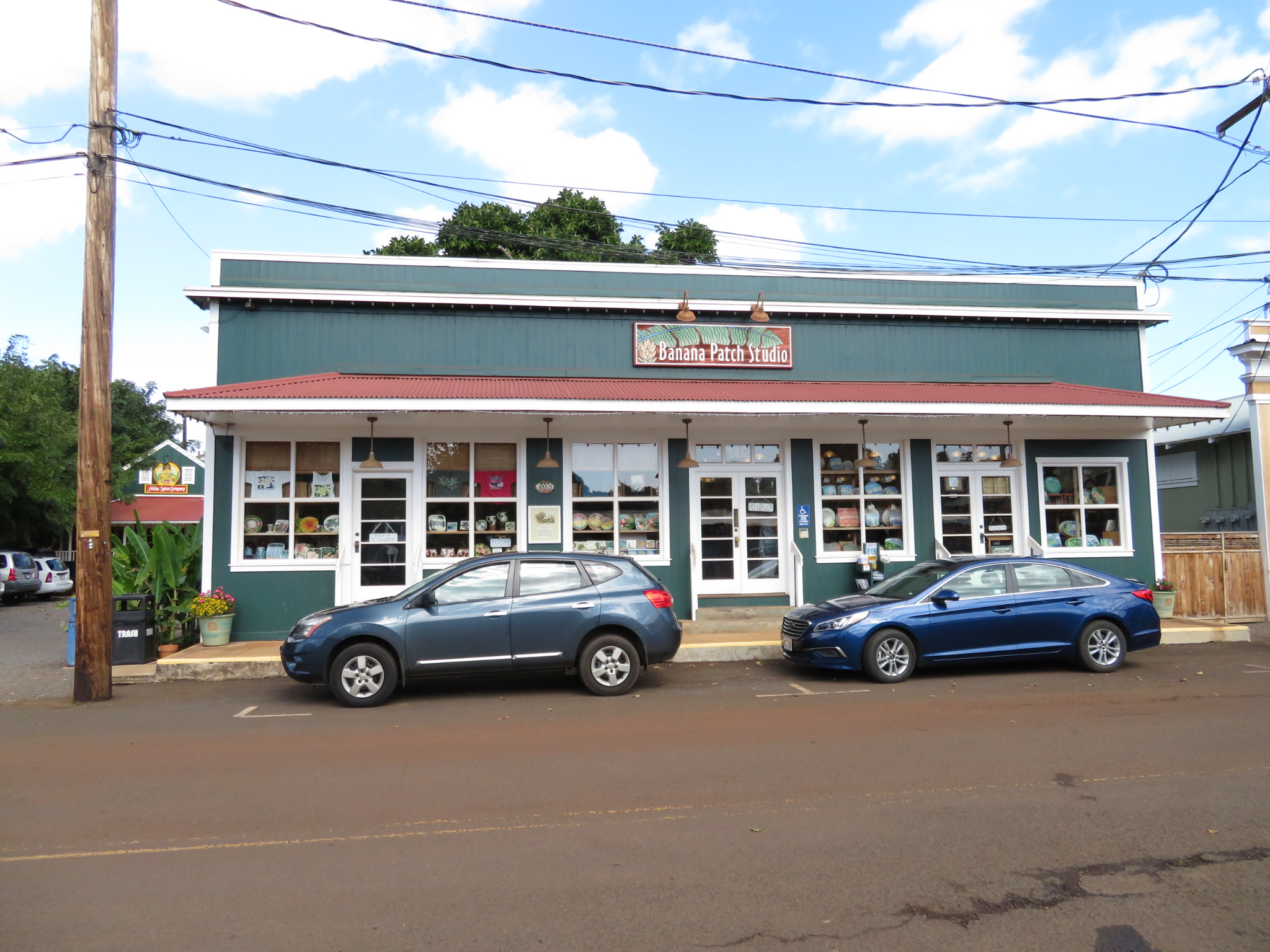
- Hanapepe Pool Hall

- Location within Hawaii
- Location: 3865 Hanapepe Road Hanapepe, Hawaii
- Coordinates: 21.911452°N 159.586704°W
- Area: less than one acre
- Built: 1926
- Architectural style: Vernacular Wood Commercial
- NRHP reference No.: 93001033
- Added to NRHP: October 13, 1993

Hanapēpē Town Lot No. 18, Hanapēpē, Hawaii, on the island of Kauaʻi, is a building built in 1926. Historically remembered as the Pool Hall, it was built as a coffee shop, then later partly used as a radio shop. It was listed on the National Register of Historic Places in 1993. Also listed on the state register, restoration of the building was completed in 2003 after being damaged in Hurricane Iniki.

It was deemed "significant as a surviving example of the vernacular wood commercial buildings constructed in Hawaii in the early twentieth century. Single wall construction and the false front are characteristic of the type. The plantations popularized single wall construction, but the method was used throughout the islands because of its low cost and ease of construction. The unsupported pent roofs at the sidewalk are characteristic of Hanapepe's commercial buildings."

It was deemed significant also for association with the 1920s and 1930s growth of Hanapepe, a town that is unique in Kauai for developing not as a plantation town, but rather as workers left plantations elsewhere and moved to the area to farm and to open businesses.
