= Hawaiʻi Register of Historic Places =

Listing of sites of historical significance located in Hawaii

The Hawaiʻi Register of Historic Places (HRHP) is a listing of sites of historical significance located in Hawaii. It is maintained by the Hawaiʻi State Historic Preservation Division. It was established when the Hawaii State Legislature passed Chapter 6E in 1976, in an effort to preserve its historic sites, as economic growth on the islands threatened to destroy numerous state landmarks.

As of February 2022, there are 1,054 properties listed on the state register, many of which are also on the National Register of Historic Places.

== Nomination ==
To be listed on the Hawaiʻi Register of Historic Places, a property or district needs to meet several criteria, including all of those set by the National Register of Historic Places. The property must be older than 50 years (with some exceptions made). In addition to these criteria, Chapter 6E sets forth several additional criteria:

1. Must have maintained its architectural or geographical integrity, and must be significant to Hawaii's culture, history, archaeology, and/or architecture, which might entail:
  1. Having an association with an important historical event, period, or person;
  2. Being architecturally or artistically significant, e.g. being deemed a quality example of an architectural style or a notable architect's work;
2. Must have a positive environmental impact on its surroundings; and
3. Preserving the property would be beneficial to the cultural and historical understanding of Hawaii, Oceania, or the United States.

An architectural historian is typically consulted to complete the nomination forms. Once these criteria are met and paperwork has been submitted, the Hawaiʻi Register of Historic Places Review Board meets to review and vote on whether or not to induct the property, which they might also submit to the National Register of Historic Places. Board members hold their position for four years and are nominated by the Governor of Hawaii as experts in the fields of state history, architecture, archaeology, and sociology.

== See also ==
- National Register of Historic Places listings in Hawaii
- List of National Historic Landmarks in Hawaii
