= List of National Historic Landmarks in Hawaii =

This is a complete List of National Historic Landmarks in Hawaiʻi. The United States National Historic Landmark program is operated under the auspices of the National Park Service, and recognizes structures, districts, objects, and similar resources according to a list of criteria of national significance. The state of Hawaiʻi is home to 33 of these landmarks, many of which relate the state's role in World War II and the archaeological remains of ancient Hawaiians, among other stories. The table below lists all of these sites, along with added detail and description. They are distributed across six of the Hawaiian islands, with the greatest number (16) on Oʻahu.

== Key ==
| | National Historic Landmark |
| ^{†} | National Historic Landmark District |
| ^{#} | National Historic Site, National Historical Park, or National Memorial |

== Current NHLs ==
| | Landmark name | Image | Date designated | Location | Island | Description |
|---|---|---|---|---|---|---|
| 1^{#} | USS Arizona (shipwreck) | USS Arizona (shipwreck) | May 5, 1989 (#89001083) | Pearl Harbor; 21°22′00″N 157°57′10″W | Oʻahu | Sunken remains of USS Arizona; destroyed in battle during the Japanese attack on Pearl Harbor. Now the centerpiece of the NRHP USS Arizona Memorial |
| 2 | USS Bowfin (submarine) | USS Bowfin (submarine) | January 14, 1986 (#82000149) | Pearl Harbor; 21°22′20″N 157°56′30″W | Oʻahu | US Navy submarine which sank 16 Japanese vessels during World War II. Now a museum ship. |
| 3 | CINCPAC Headquarters | CINCPAC Headquarters | May 28, 1987 (#87001295) | Joint Base Pearl Harbor–Hickam; 21°21′58″N 157°56′18″W | Oʻahu | Headquarters of Admiral Chester W. Nimitz from 1942 through 1945 |
| 4 | Cook Landing Site | Cook Landing Site | December 29, 1962 (#66000298) | Waimea; 21°57′07″N 159°39′57″W | Kauaʻi | Captain James Cook landed here at the mouth of the Waimea River on January 20, 1778; He was the first European known to have sighted the Hawaiian Islands |
| 6^{†} | Hickam Field | Hickam Field | September 16, 1985 (#85002725) | Honolulu; 21°19′57″N 157°57′13″W | Oʻahu | Air Force Base which was a primary target in the attack on Pearl Harbor and played a key role throughout the World War II Pacific campaign. |
| 7^{†} | Hōkūkano-ʻUalapuʻe Complex | | December 29, 1962 (#66000304) | ʻUalapuʻe; 21°03′45″N 156°49′48″W | Molokaʻi | Archaeological site; includes six heiaus (religious sites) and two fishponds |
| 8^{#} | Honokōhau Settlement | Honokōhau Settlement | December 29, 1962 (#66000287) | Kona District; 19°40′42″N 156°01′26″W | Hawaiʻi | Site of an ancient Hawaiian settlement; includes fishponds, kahua (house site platforms), kiʻi pōhaku (petroglyphs), hōlua (stone slide) and heiau (religious site). |
| 9 | Huilua Fishpond | Huilua Fishpond | December 29, 1962 (#66000295) | Kāneʻohe; 21°33′27″N 157°52′06″W | Oʻahu | Last surviving fishponds out of an estimated 97 such structures that once existed on coastal Oʻahu; still operational well into the 20th century |
| 10 | ʻIolani Palace | ʻIolani Palace | December 29, 1962 (#66000293) | Honolulu; 21°18′23″N 157°51′35″W | Oʻahu | Only royal palace used as an official residence by a reigning monarch in the United States |
| 11^{#} | Kalaupapa Leprosy Settlement | Kalaupapa Leprosy Settlement | January 7, 1976 (#76002145) | Kalaupapa; 21°11′21″N 156°58′59″W | Molokaʻi | Founded in 1866 for the isolation of Hawaiians afflicted with leprosy. Now part of the larger Kalaupapa National Historical Park |
| 12 | Kamakahonu | Kamakahonu | December 29, 1962 (#66000288) | Kailua-Kona; 19°38′20″N 155°59′51″W | Hawaiʻi | Final residence of King Kamehameha I |
| 13^{†} | Kaneohe Naval Air Station | Kaneohe Naval Air Station | May 28, 1987 (#87001299) | Kailua; 21°26′48″N 157°45′59″W | Oʻahu | Naval airfield attacked by the Japanese seven minutes before the attack on Pearl Harbor began in order to establish air superiority |
| 14 | Kaunolū Village Site | Kaunolū Village Site | December 29, 1962 (#66000303) | South coast 20°44′05″N 156°57′52″W | Lānaʻi | This former fishing village, abandoned in the 1880s, is the largest surviving ruins of a prehistoric Hawaiian village. The archaeological site is very well preserved. |
| 15 | Kawaiahaʻo Church and Mission Houses | Kawaiahaʻo Church and Mission Houses | December 29, 1962 (#66000294) | Honolulu; 21°18′17″N 157°51′32″W | Oʻahu | Formerly the national church of the Hawaiian Kingdom and chapel of the royal family |
| 16 | Keauhou Hōlua Slide | Keauhou Hōlua Slide | December 29, 1962 (#66000290) | Keauhou; 19°33′44″N 155°57′30″W | Hawaiʻi | This is the largest and best-preserved hōlua course, used in the extremely toboggan-like activity restricted to chiefs. |
| 17^{†} | Lahaina Historic District | Lahaina Historic District | December 29, 1962 (#66000302) | Lāhainā; 20°52′41″N 156°40′40″W | Maui | Preserves the atmosphere of a mid-19th century Hawaiian seaport |
| 18 | Loaloa Heiau | Loaloa Heiau | December 29, 1962 (#66000301) | Kaupo; 20°38′37″N 156°07′26″W | Maui | Intact examples of a large luakini heiau (state level temple) where human sacrifice was performed |
| 19 | Mauna Kea Adz Quarry | Mauna Kea Adz Quarry | December 29, 1962 (#66000285) | Mauna Kea Ice Age Reserve; 19°48′01″N 155°28′04″W | Hawaiʻi | Used by prehistoric Hawaiians to obtain basalt for stone tools; also includes religious shrines, trails, rockshelters, and petroglyphs. |
| 20 | Moʻokini Heiau | Moʻokini Heiau | December 29, 1962 (#66000284) | Hāwī; 20°15′26″N 155°52′36″W | Hawaiʻi | Temple erected in 480 A.D. and dedicated to Kū, the Hawaiʻian god of war |
| 21 | Old Sugar Mill of Koloa | Old Sugar Mill of Koloa | December 29, 1962 (#66000296) | Kōloa; 21°54′35″N 159°28′09″W | Kauaʻi | First commercially successful sugarcane plantation in Hawaii |
| 22 | Opana Radar Site | Opana Radar Site | April 19, 1994 (#91001379) | Kawela; 21°41′22″N 158°00′43″W | Oʻahu | Commemorates the first operational use of radar by the United States in wartime, during the attack on Pearl Harbor |
| 23^{†} | Palm Circle | Palm Circle | May 28, 1987 (#84000104) | Honolulu; 21°20′44″N 157°53′17″W | Oʻahu | This portion of Fort Shafter housed the headquarters of the commanding general and his staff, U.S. Army forces, Pacific Ocean Areas, during World War II. By 1944 this command was responsible for the supply and administration of all U.S. Army personnel in the Central and South Pacific, and from 1943 to 1945, carried out logistical planning for the invasions of the Gilberts, Marshalls, Marianas, Guam, Palau, and Okinawa. |
| 24 | Piʻilanihale Heiau | Piʻilanihale Heiau | January 29, 1964 (#66000300) | Hāna; 20°47′54″N 156°02′14″W | Maui | Ancient temple in Polynesia; constructed from lava blocks; dates from the 16th century |
| 25 | Puʻu o Mahuka Heiau | Puʻu o Mahuka Heiau | December 29, 1962 (#66000292) | Haleʻiwa; 21°38′30″N 158°03′32″W | Oʻahu | Ancient temple, possibly the sacrificial site of three men from HMS Daedalus |
| 26^{#} | Puʻukoholā Heiau | Puʻukoholā Heiau | December 29, 1962 (#66000105) | Kawaihae; 20°01′40″N 155°49′17″W | Hawaiʻi | Ruins of Puʻukoholā Heiau ("Temple on the Hill of the Whale"); temple built by King Kamehameha the Great between 1790 and 1791 |
| 27 | Russian Fort | Russian Fort | December 29, 1962 (#66000299) | Waimea; 21°57′06″N 159°39′51″W | Kauaʻi | Constructed in 1816; result of the alliance between High Chief Kaumualii and the Russian-American Company |
| 28^{†} | South Point Complex | South Point Complex | December 29, 1962 (#66000291) | Nāʻālehu; 18°54′57″N 155°40′37″W | Hawaiʻi | Site of one of the earliest Hawaiian settlements, this is the southernmost point in the United States |
| 29^{†} | United States Naval Base, Pearl Harbor | United States Naval Base, Pearl Harbor | January 29, 1964 (#66000940) | Pearl Harbor; 21°21′N 157°57′W | Oʻahu | Site of the attack on Pearl Harbor by the Empire of Japan on December 7, 1941 |
| 30 | USS Utah (shipwreck) | USS Utah (shipwreck) | May 5, 1989 (#89001084) | Pearl Harbor; 21°22′14″N 157°57′55″W | Oʻahu | The remains of USS Utah, sunk by the Japanese during the attack on Pearl Harbor |
| 31^{†} | Wailua Complex of Heiaus | Wailua Complex of Heiaus | December 29, 1962 (#66000297) | Wailua; 22°02′41″N 159°20′14″W | Kauaʻi | An archaeological site with four heiaus |
| 32 | Washington Place | Washington Place | March 29, 2007 (#73000666) | Honolulu; 21°18′32″N 157°51′24″W | Oʻahu | Built in 1844–1847, this was the home of Queen Liliʻuokalani, the last reigning monarch of the Hawaiian kingdom, from the time of her marriage in 1862 to her death in 1917. While living here, she saw the monarchy overthrown and Hawaiʻi annexed to the United States. It was subsequently used as the executive mansion by the territorial and state governors of Hawaiʻi until 2002. |
| 33^{†} | Wheeler Field | Wheeler Field | May 28, 1987 (#87001297) | Honolulu; 21°29′12″N 158°02′38″W | Oʻahu | Another primary target during the attack on Pearl Harbor, the damage caused here allowed the Japanese to maintain air superiority during the attack. |

== Former National Historic Landmark ==
| | Landmark name | Image | Date designated | Date withdrawn | Locality | County | Description |
|---|---|---|---|---|---|---|---|
| 1 | Falls of Clyde (four-masted oil tanker) | | April 11, 1989 | December 13, 2024 | Honolulu; 21°18′21″N 157°51′54″W | Honolulu | Only surviving iron-hulled, four-masted full rigged ship, and the only surviving sail-driven oil tanker in the world. She was for a time a museum ship, but fell into neglect and was eventually scrapped. |

== Historical National Park Service Areas in Hawaii ==
In addition, or perhaps overlapping, are five U.S. National Park Service areas of historic orientation in Hawaii. Of these, the USS Arizona Memorial, Kaloko-Honokohau National Historical Park, Kalaupapa National Historical Park, and Puukohola Heiau National Historic Site are also National Historic Landmarks and are listed above. The other one, which is also a landmark of national historic importance, is Pu'uhonua o Honaunau National Historical Park. It was established in 1955, before the National Historic Landmarks program started.

== See also ==
- List of U.S. National Historic Landmarks by state
- National Register of Historic Places listings in Hawaii
- Historic preservation
- National Register of Historic Places
- History of Hawaii
- List of National Natural Landmarks in Hawaii
