= USS League Island (AG-149) =

Cargo ship of the United States Navy

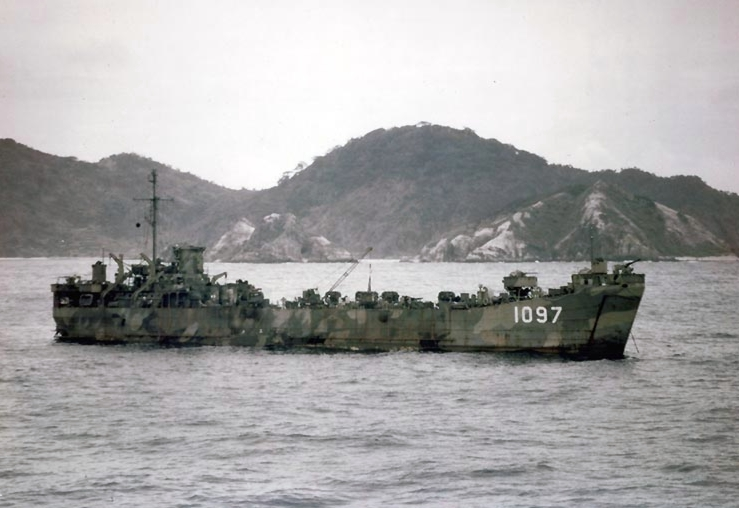
- LST-1097 in June 1945

History

United States
- Name: USS League Island
- Namesake: League Island, the site of the Navy Yard, Philadelphia, Pennsylvania, at the junction of the Schuylkill River and the Delaware River
- Builder: Jeffersonville Boat & Machine Co., Jeffersonville, Indiana
- Laid down: 22 November 1944
- Launched: 16 January 1945
- Sponsored by: Mrs. Susan A. Rash
- Commissioned: 9 February 1945 as USS LST-1097
- Decommissioned: 19 December 1946, at Portland, Oregon
- In service: 3 January 1951 as League Island (AG-149)
- Out of service: 14 December 1956, at Astoria, Oregon
- Reclassified: League Island (AG-149), 27 January 1949; AKS-30, 18 August 1951
- Refit: General Stores Issue Ship 17 January to 2 March 1951 at Bethlehem Pacific Coast Steel Corp., Oakland, California
- Stricken: 1 April 1960
- Identification: IMO number: 6501381
- Honors and awards: one battle star for World War II service
- Fate: Scrapped 21 September 1981

General characteristics
- Class & type: LST-511-class tank landing ship
- Displacement: 1,625 tons light; 3,640 tons full load
- Length: 328 ft (100 m)
- Beam: 50 ft (15 m)
- Draft: loaded bow 8 ft 2 in (2.49 m) - stern 14 ft 1 in (4.29 m)
- Propulsion: two General Motors 12-567 diesel engines, two shafts, twin rudders
- Speed: 12 knots
- Boats & landing craft carried: two LCVPs
- Troops: 130 officers and enlisted
- Complement: 8-10 officers, 89-100 enlisted
- Armament: two 40 mm guns, twelve 20 mm guns

USS League Island (AG-149/AKS-30) – also known as USS LST-1097 - was an LST-511-class tank landing ship launched by the U.S. Navy during the final months of World War II. League Island served as a supply and stores-issue ship for the U.S. 7th Fleet, and was decommissioned after the war.

== Constructed in Jeffersonville, Indiana ==
LST-1097 was laid down by Jeffersonville Bridge & Machinery Co., Jeffersonville, Indiana, 22 November 1944; launched 16 January 1945: sponsored by Mrs. Susan A. Rash; and commissioned 9 February 1945.

== World War II-related service ==
LST-1097 reported for duty to the Commander in Chief, Pacific Fleet, 27 March 1945. After a number of short voyages in the western Pacific Ocean she participated in the Okinawa campaign from 21 May to 30 June. The ship entered Pearl Harbor Navy Yard in December for conversion to an Ordnance Spare Parts Barge, and remained there until March 1946. She steamed to Portland, Oregon, 21 November and decommissioned 19 December 1946.

== Korean War service ==
On 27 January 1949 she was reclassified AG-149, and named League Island 1 February. Due to the Korean War buildup, she recommissioned 3 January 1951.

She was converted to a cargo stores ship 17 January to 2 March by Bethlehem Pacific Coast Steel Corp., Oakland, California, and upon completion, moved to San Diego, California, 24 March.

The ship departed for Japan 1 June to join ServRon 3 with whom she served from Sasebo and Yokosuka from June 1951 to August 1954. She was reclassified AKS-30 on 18 August 1951. During this period she carried out her mission of supplying spare parts to the fleet in the Far East in support of America's Korean commitment.

== Post-war service ==
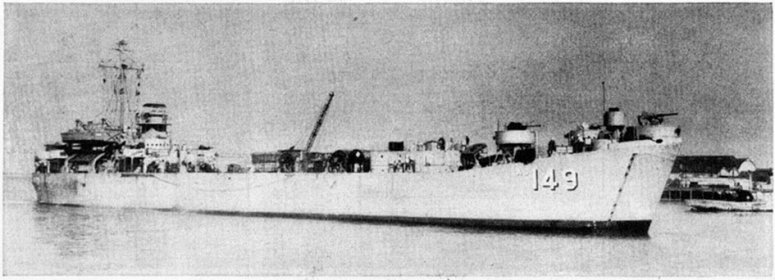
USS League Island (AG-149).

With the cessation of hostilities in Korea, the ship sailed to the Philippines to assist the U.S. 7th Fleet in the South China Sea area. She served from Subic Bay, not returning to Japan until May 1955.

Early in 1956 she was back in the Philippines to continue logistic support for the 7th Fleet. She returned to Sasebo March 1956, and sailed for San Francisco, California, 30 April.

== Decommissioning ==
She decommissioned at Astoria, Oregon, 14 December 1956. Stricken from the Navy List 1 April 1960, she was sold 17 March 1961 to Hatch & Kirk Co., Seattle, Washington, and towed away for scrapping on 24 April 1961. However AG149 did not go for scrap and ended up in Singapore in the early 1970s where it was bought by an Arab businessman and renamed Al Rashedia. The ship was modified to off load bagged cement and loaded with bagged cement she sailed for Bahrain in the Persian Gulf at the time of the building boom. On arrival around 1975 the vessel was off loaded and beached on Muhurraq Island part of Bahrain and abandoned. The vessel was moved in the late 70s from Muhurraq and beached on the opposite side of the anchorage on Bahrain Island and left. 149 slowly sank by the bows and remained with the foredeck awash for over two years. In 1980 plans were submitted to the Bahrain Government to redevelop the area where the ship lay into a yacht marina. Approval was granted and the first attempt at salvaging the vessel was undertaken by a local diving company using compressed air. A month later despite extensive diving operations the vessel had not moved. The company went into liquidation and many suppliers of plant and equipment went unpaid. The vessel was then purchased for scrap by a local company and the removal awarded to the Dutch salvage company Smit International, who in turn sub contracted the diving operations to D.M.S. who had a specialist team of salvage divers. Seven days after starting operations the Al Rashedia was towed away and subsequently sold to a company in the United Arab Emirates. It was here at Sharjah in 1981 that the hull was cut down and the vessel turned into a barge. She sank at her moorings at Sitra on 21 September 1981 and was subsequently scrapped at Gadani Beach.

== Honors and awards ==
LST-1097 received one battle star for World War Il service:

- Okinawa Gunto operation (assault and occupation of Okinawa Gunto, May and June 1945)
