= Hōkūkano-ʻUalapuʻe Complex =

- Hōkūkano–ʻUalapuʻe Complex
- U.S. National Register of Historic Places
- U.S. National Historic Landmark District
- Hawaiʻi Register of Historic Places
- Location within Hawaii Location within the United States
- Location: Hawaii Route 450, ʻUalapuʻe, Molokaʻi, Hawaii
- Coordinates: 21°3′45.1″N 156°49′48″W
- Area: 146.5 acres (59.3 ha)
- NRHP reference No.: 66000304

Significant dates
- Added to NRHP: October 15, 1966
- Designated NHLD: December 29, 1962
- Designated HRHP: October 15, 1996

The Hōkūkano-ʻUalapuʻe Complex is a National Historic Landmarked pre-contact archaeological site on several properties adjacent to Hawaii Route 450 in ʻUalapuʻe, on Molokaʻi island. The complex includes six heiaus and two fishponds. The complex is one of the most important collections of native Hawaiian sites in Hawaii. It was designated a National Historic Landmark in 1962 and added to the National Register of Historic Places on October 15, 1966.

== ʻIliʻiliʻōpae Heiau ==
The largest of the six heiau in the complex is ʻIliʻiliʻōpae, the largest heiau on Molokai and the second largest in all Hawaii. It consists of four tiers, rising to a stone platform measuring 287 feet by 87 feet. It is located half a mile north of Highway 450, and can be reached by a track up the Mahulepu valley from the highway near milepost 15.

According to legend ʻIliʻiliʻōpae Heiau was constructed in a single night with boulders passed from hand to hand along a chain of menehune from the Wailau valley on the north shore. A hiking trail from the temple to Wailau has now fallen into disuse and is overgrown.

== Fish ponds ==
The two ponds considered part of this complex are Keawanui Pond and ʻUalapuʻe Pond. Keawanui Pond is located on the south coast of Molokai, about 1.5 miles (2.4 km) west of ʻUalapuʻe. It is a loko kuapā, or walled pond, which distinctively uses a curved portion of the natural coastline and a small island as part of its isolating barrier. The barrier wall is pierced in several places by sluice gates. The second pond, ʻUalapuʻe Pond, is located on the shore at the eponymous village, and is also a loko kuapa, the seawall built out of coral and basalt. The wall is 1,575 feet (480 m) long, 4 feet (1.2 m) high, and varies in width from 8 to 19 feet (2.4 to 5.8 m). There are two sluice gates in the wall.

== See also ==
- National Register of Historic Places listings in Maui County, Hawaii
- List of National Historic Landmarks in Hawaii
