= Keanae School =

Historic building in Hawaii, U.S.

- U.S. National Register of Historic Places
- Hawaiʻi Register of Historic Places
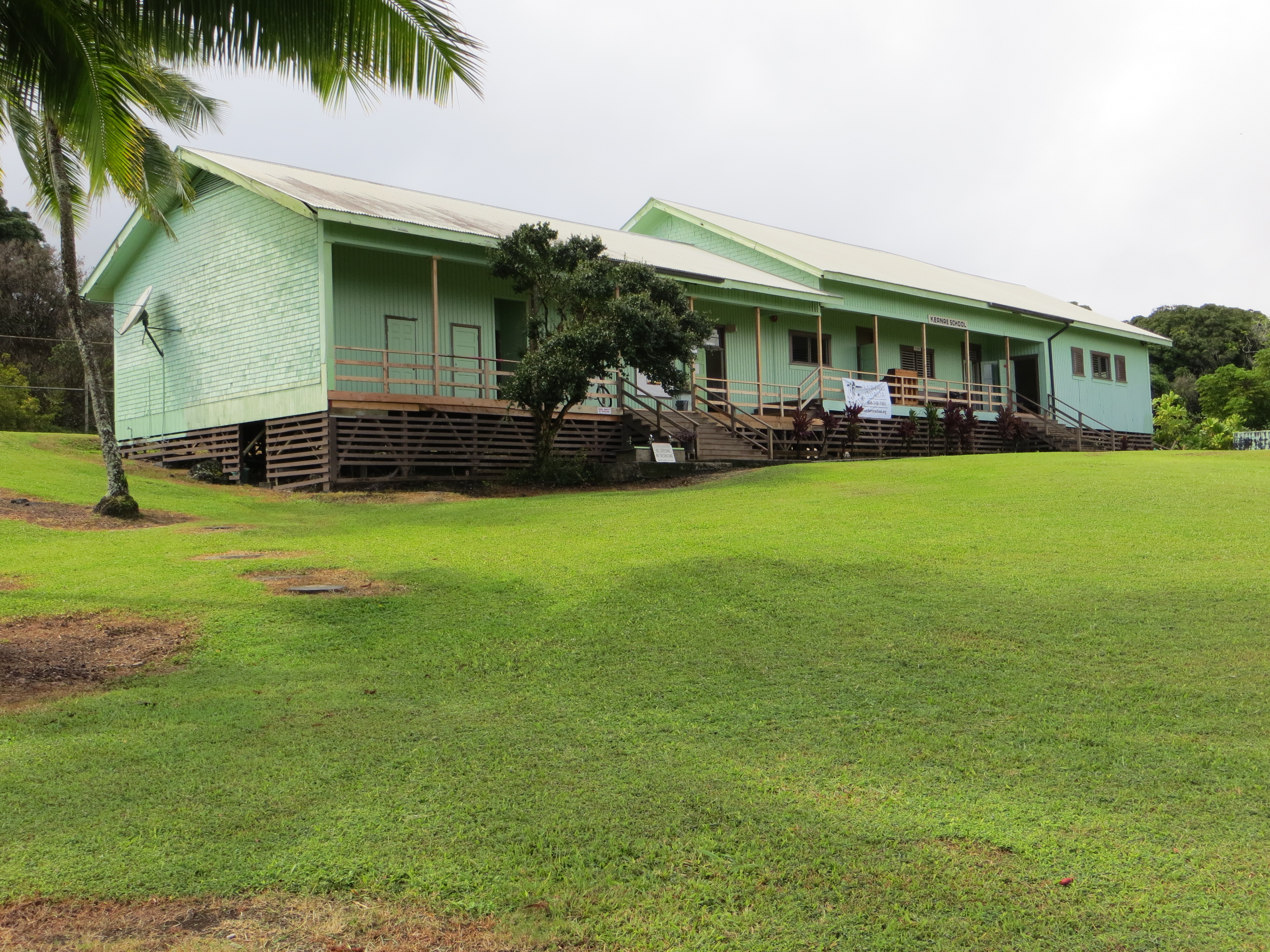

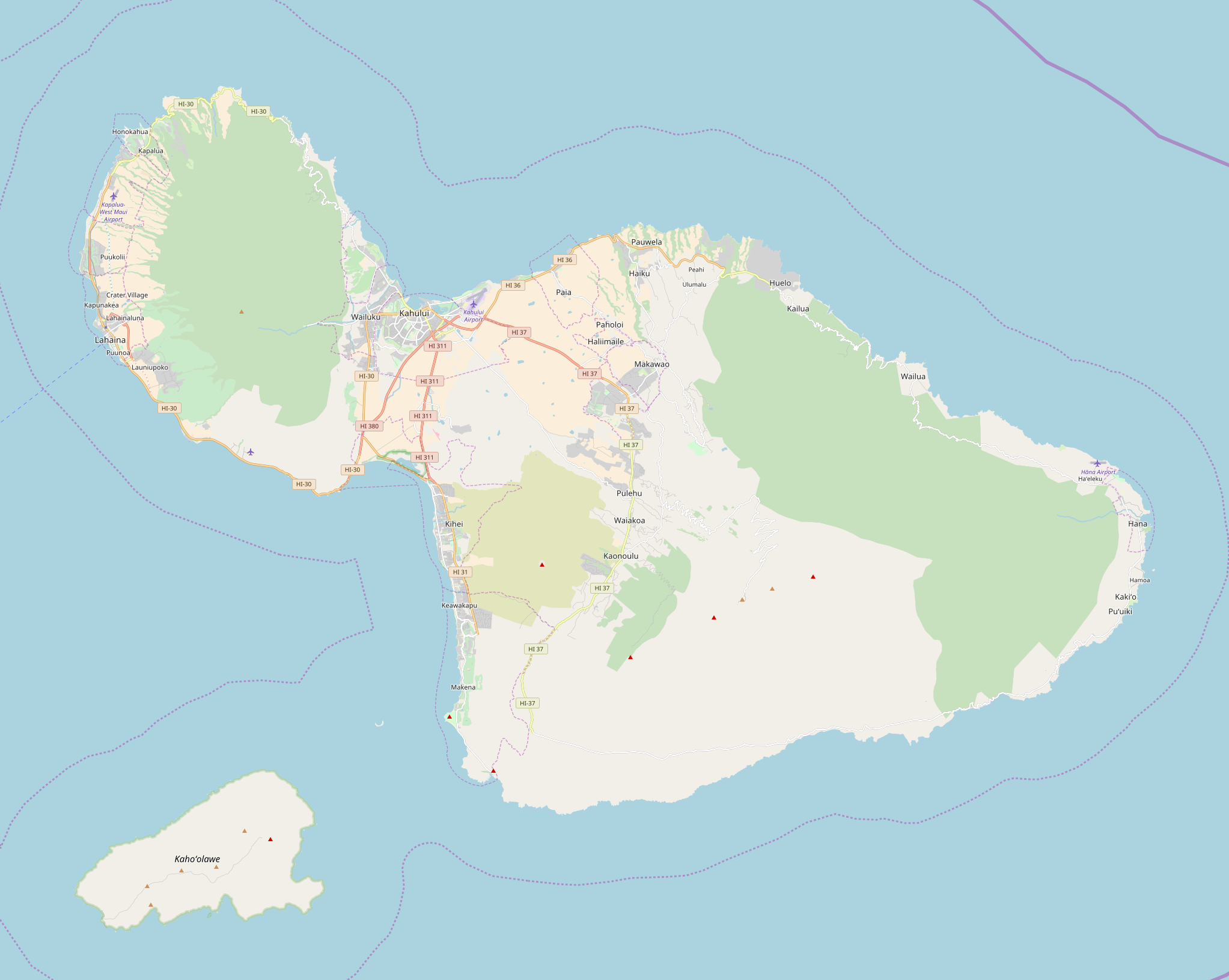
- Location within Maui Location within Hawaii
- Location: Government Road; Keanae, HI 96713
- Coordinates: 20.851613°N 156.138043°W
- Area: 3.53 acres (1.43 ha)
- Built: 1912
- MPS: Maui Public Schools MPS
- NRHP reference No.: 00000665
- HRHP No.: 50-50-04-01630

Significant dates
- Added to NRHP: June 30, 2000
- Designated HRHP: June 2, 1992

Keʻanae School, later Keʻanae Elementary School, is a historic school building in Keanae, Hawaii, recognized by the National Register of Historic Places (NRHP). It formerly operated under the Hawaii Department of Education (HIDOE).

The building is a one-room schoolhouse and as of 2005 had been used as a community center.

Circa the early 2000s the school, with grades Kindergarten through three, had one teacher and an average of five students, with the latter figure making Keanae School the smallest public school by enrollment in Hawaii. In 2005 three children were officially registered as students, and Keanae School's principal, Rick Paul, was also that of Hana High and Elementary School in Hana. That year Ron Okamura, the superintendent of the Maui Region of HIDOE, and Paul jointly decided to have those students attend Hana School to conserve resources, though Keanae School was not formally closed at that time. Some area residents opposed the closure of the Keanae building, partly due to the distance between Ke'anae and Hana, 18 miles (29 km). According to Paul, if the Ke'anae building had not closed, the Hana school would have had one fewer teacher as that grade level would have had insufficient students. Classes would resume if the prospective enrollment became 12. Classes were not held at Keanae School since and in 2010 HIDOE formally closed the school.
