= Mezoneuron enneaphyllum =

Scientific classification
- Kingdom: Plantae
- Clade: Tracheophytes
- Clade: Angiosperms
- Clade: Eudicots
- Clade: Rosids
- Order: Fabales
- Family: Fabaceae
- Subfamily: Caesalpinioideae
- Genus: Mezoneuron
- Species: M. enneaphyllum

Binomial name
- Mezoneuron enneaphyllum (Roxb.) Benth.

Synonyms
- Caesalpinia enneaphylla Roxb.; Mezoneuron glabrum var. enneaphyllum (Roxb.) Kurz

Species of legume

Mezoneuron enneaphyllum is a tropical tree species originating in India, Indo-China and Malesia.

== Distribution ==
It is found in Bangladesh; China; Guangxi; Yunnan; India; Arunachal Pradesh; Tripura; Indonesia; Java; Lesser Sunda Islands; Malaysia; Myanmar; Pakistan; Sulawesi; Thailand; Vietnam
