= Kaupo School =

- U.S. National Register of Historic Places
- Hawaiʻi Register of Historic Places
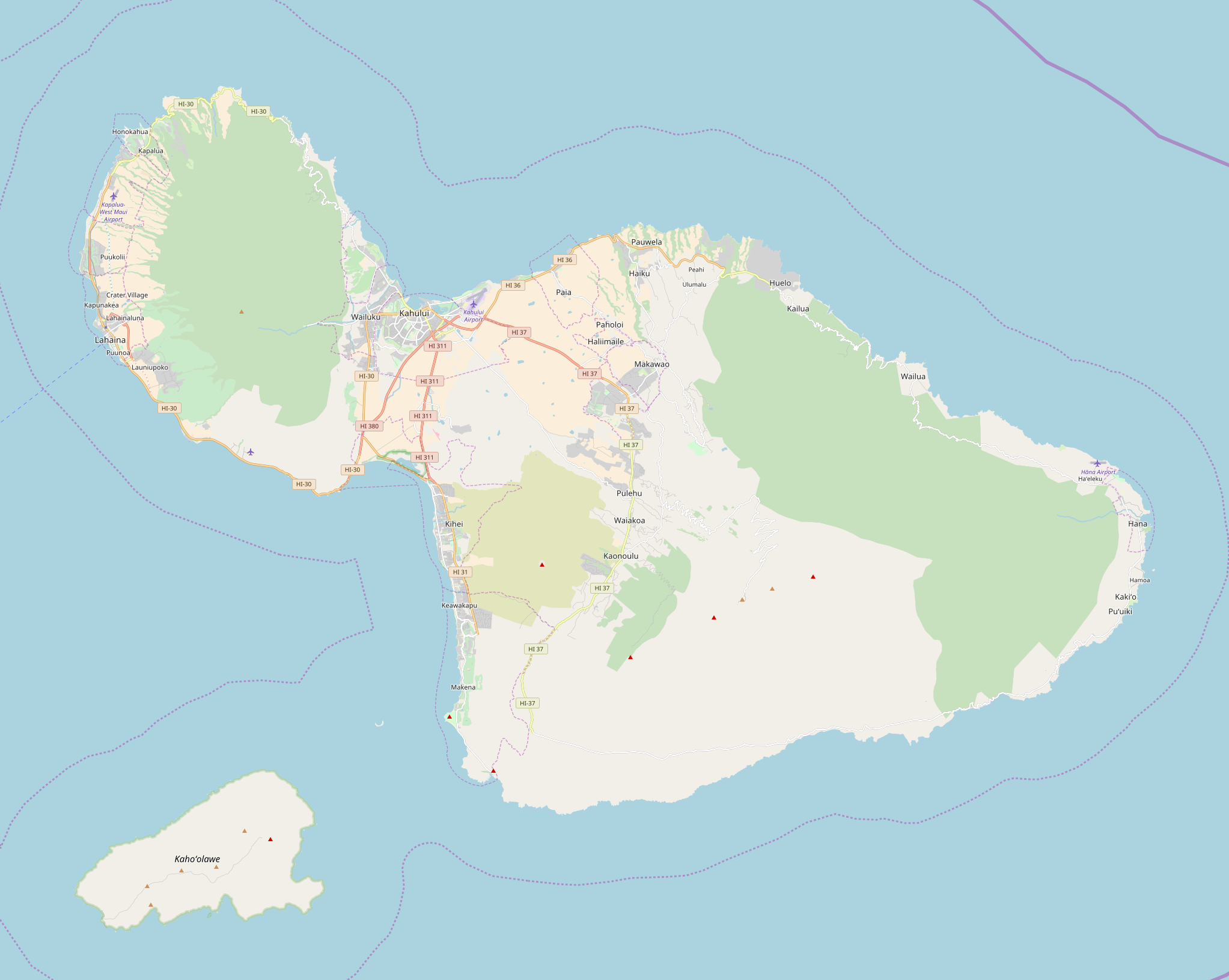
- Location within Maui Location within Hawaii
- Coordinates: 20°38′13″N 156°07′21″W
- Area: 2.25 acres (0.91 ha)
- Built: 1923
- MPS: Maui Public Schools MPS
- NRHP reference No.: 00000662
- HRHP No.: 50-50-04-01630

Significant dates
- Added to NRHP: June 30, 2000
- Designated HRHP: June 1, 1996

Kaupō School was a historic school building in Kaupo, Hawaii, recognized by the National Register of Historic Places (NRHP). It was under the Hawaii Department of Education (HIDOE).

== History and overview ==
In 1923 the school was built. The property had a school building with two rooms and a cottage that served as the residence for a teacher. By 1964 the number of students was five, so the HIDOE closed the school with Hana High and Elementary School in Hana taking the students. The school reopened in circa 1982 as some landslides that happened that year obstructed the road to Hana. Kaupo School later closed when the road reopened.

In 2016 the Governor of Hawaii and the Legislature of Hawaii gifted the Kaupo Community Association funds to restore the building and work was to begin in 2019. The Maui News wrote that the school building had "deteriorated" and that the initial goal was to restore the building to its pre-existing state. However in 2020 Kaupo Community Association announced that the building had to be deconstructed due to the pre-existing damage; some members of the area community disliked how what would effectively be a rebuild could cause the NRHP to delist the building.
