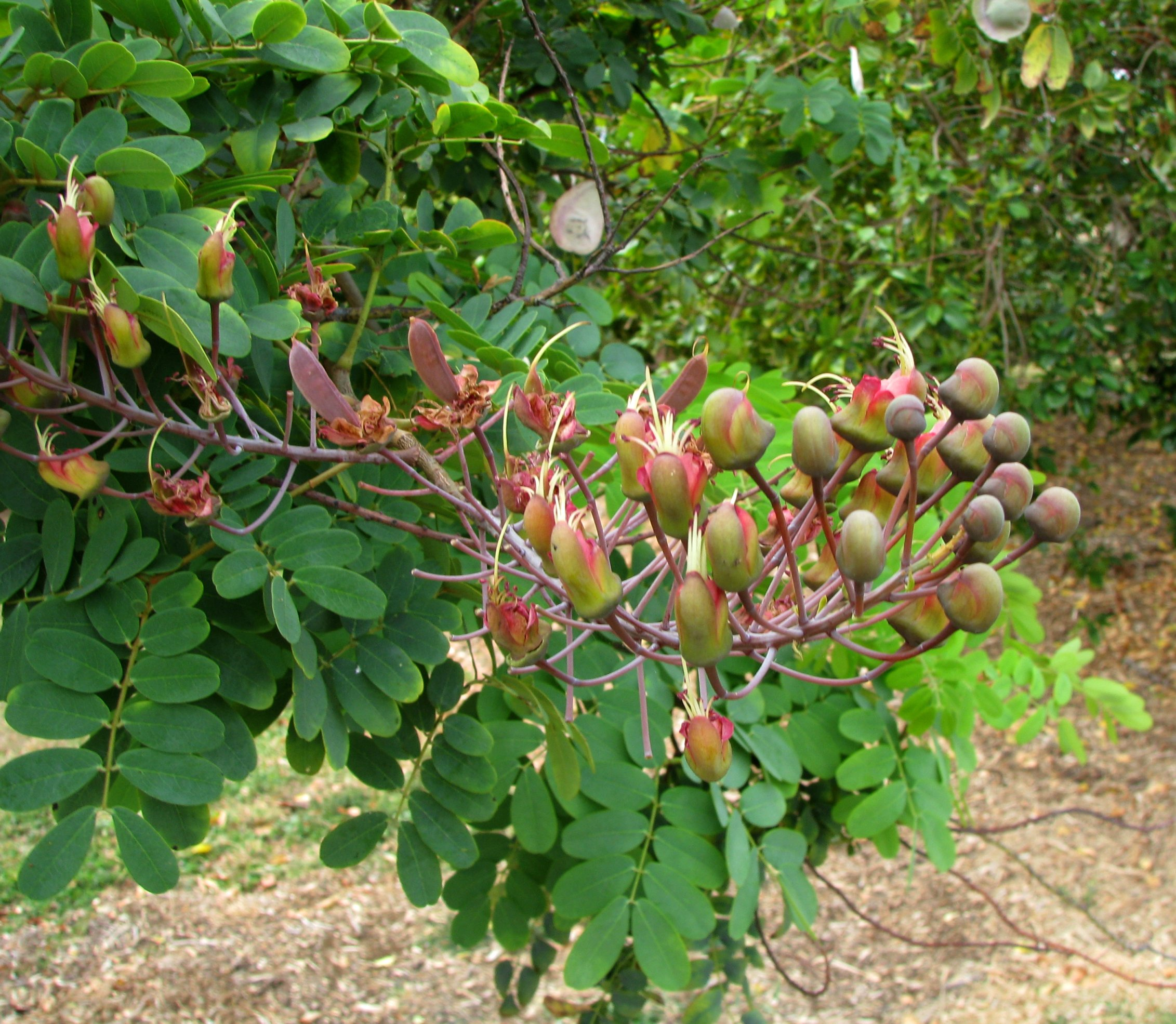
- Mezoneuron kauaiense

Scientific classification
- Kingdom: Plantae
- Clade: Tracheophytes
- Clade: Angiosperms
- Clade: Eudicots
- Clade: Rosids
- Order: Fabales
- Family: Fabaceae
- Subfamily: Caesalpinioideae
- Tribe: Caesalpinieae
- Genus: Mezoneuron; Desf. 1818

Type species
- Mezoneuron pubescens Desf.

Species
- See text

Synonyms
- Caesalpinia subgen. Mezoneuron (Desf. 1818) Vidal ex Herend. & Zarucchi (1990); Mezoneurum DC. 1825, orth. var.; Mezonevron Desf. 1818, orth. var.

= Mezoneuron =

Genus of legumes

Mezoneuron is a genus of flowering plants in the legume family, Fabaceae. It belongs to the subfamily Caesalpinioideae and the tribe Caesalpinieae.

== Characteristics and distribution ==
This genus consists of lianas, often with the characteristic 'cat's claw' spines on their stems. Pods are one or more seeded, with a longitudinal (often narrow) wing along the upper suture and a wing 2 mm or more wide, which may be papery, coriaceous or woody. They may be found in Africa, Madagascar and SE Asia across the Malay Peninsula and Archipelago to New Guinea, New Caledonia and Australia, one species endemic to Hawaii.

== Species ==
Mezoneuron comprises the following species:

- Mezoneuron andamanicum Prain
- Mezoneuron angolense Welw. ex Oliv.
- Mezoneuron baudouinii Guillaumin
- Mezoneuron benthamianum Baill.
- Mezoneuron brachycarpum Benth.
- Mezoneuron cucullatum (Roxb.) Wight & Arn.
- Mezoneuron enneaphyllum (Roxb.) Wight & Arn. ex Voigt
- Mezoneuron erythrocarpum (Pedley) R. Clark & E. Gagnon
- Mezoneuron furfuraceum Prain
- Mezoneuron hildebrandtii Vatke
- Mezoneuron hymenocarpum Wight & Arn. ex Prain
- Mezoneuron kauaiense (H. Mann) Hillebr.—Uhiuhi (synonym M. kavaiense - Hawaii)
- Mezoneuron latisiliquum (Cav.) Merr.
- Mezoneuron mindorense Merr.
- Mezoneuron montrouzieri Guillaumin
- Mezoneuron nhatrangense Gagnep. (Vietnam)
- Mezoneuron nitens (F. Muell. ex Benth.) R. Clark & E. Gagnon
- Mezoneuron ouenensis (Guillaumin) R. Clark
- Mezoneuron pubescens Desf.
- Mezoneuron rubiginosum (Guillaumin) R. Clark
- Mezoneuron sinense Hemsl.
- Mezoneuron schlechteri (Harms) R. Clark
- Mezoneuron scortechinii F. Muell.
- Mezoneuron sumatranum (Roxb.) Wight & Arn. (Malesia, Indochina)

== Fossils ==
The following fossils have been described:

- †Mezoneuron claibornensis (Herendeen & Dilcher) R. Clark & E. Gagnon
- †Mezoneruon flumen-viridensis (Herendeen & Dilcher) R. Clark & E. Gagnon
- †Mezoneuron spokanensis (Knowlton) R. Clark & E. Gagnon
