= Kaloko-Honokōhau National Historical Park =

Historic Place in Hawaii County, Hawaii

- U.S. National Register of Historic Places
- U.S. National Historic Landmark
- U.S. National Historical Park
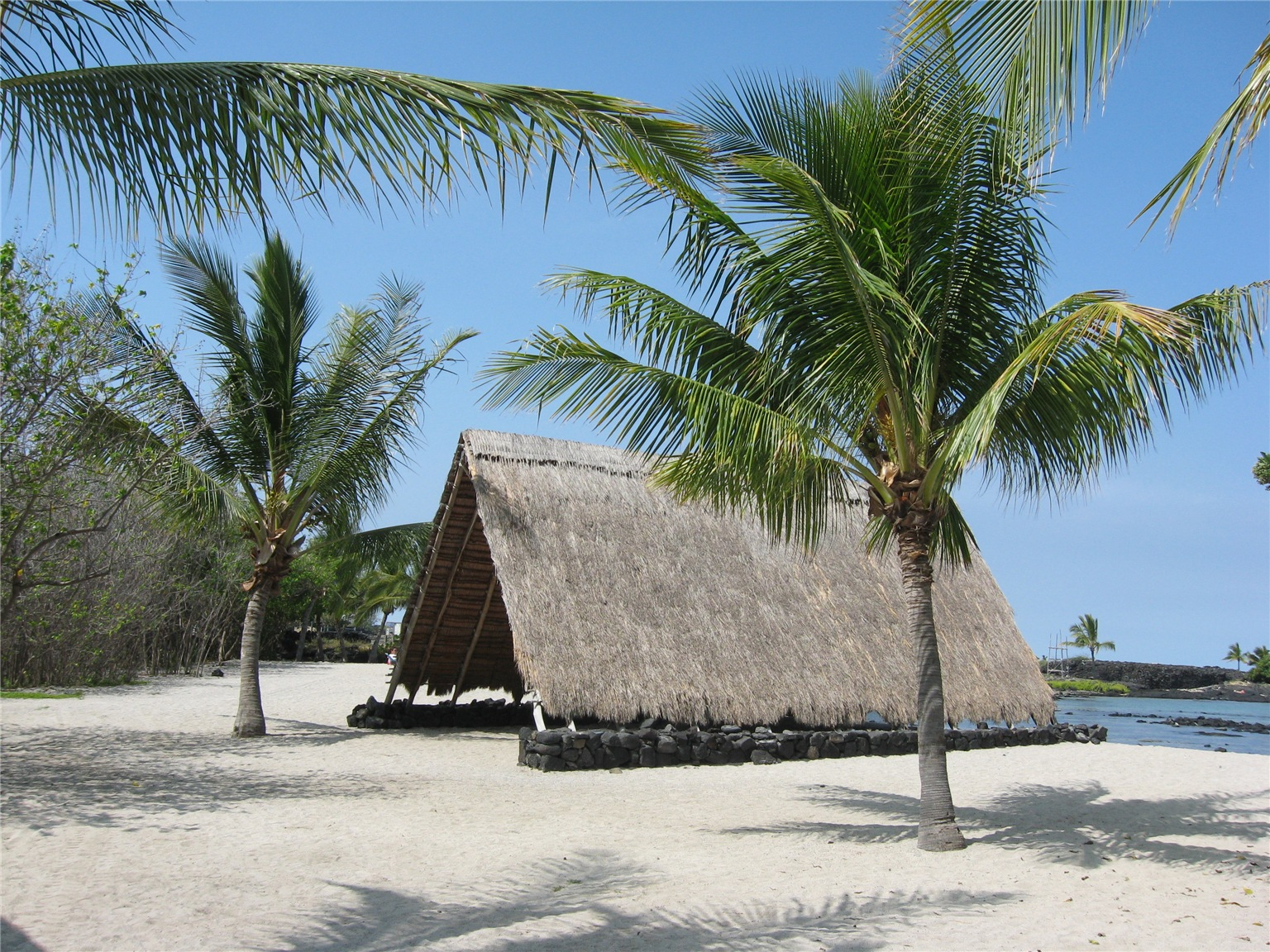
- Honokōhau Hālau

- Location within Hawaii
- Location: Hawaiʻi County, Hawaiʻi, United States
- Nearest city: Kailua-Kona, Hawaiʻi
- Coordinates: 19°40′43.32″N 156°01′19.20″W
- Area: 1,161 acres (470 ha)
- Architectural style: Dry stack masonry
- Visitation: 351,422 (2024)
- Website: Kaloko-Honokōhau National Historical Park
- NRHP reference No.: 78003148

Significant dates
- Added to NRHP: November 10, 1978
- Designated NHL: December 29, 1962

Kaloko-Honokōhau National Historical Park is a United States National Historical Park located in the Kona District on Hawaiʻi Island in the U.S. state of Hawaiʻi. It includes the National Historic Landmarked archaeological site known as the Honokōhau Settlement. The park was established on November 10, 1978, for the preservation, protection and interpretation of traditional native Hawaiian activities and culture.

== History ==
Kaloko and Honokōhau are the names of two of the four different ahupuaʻa, or traditional mountain-to-sea land divisions encompassed by the park. Although in ancient times this arid area of lava rock was called kekaha ʻaʻole wai (lands without water), the abundant sea life attracted settlement for hundreds of years.

=== Kaloko ===
Kaloko (meaning "the pond" in the Hawaiian language) is a site of fishponds used in ancient Hawaiʻi is on the north end of the park. The first reference to the pond comes from the story of Kamalalawalu, about 300 years ago. The kuapā (seawall) is over 30 feet (9.1 m) wide and 6 feet (1.8 m) high, stretching for 750 feet (230 m). Constructed by hand without mortar, the angle and gaps between the stones deflected the surf better than many modern concrete seawalls.

ʻAimakapā fishpond is an important wetland area protecting native birds including the koloa maoli (Hawaiian duck, Anas wyvilliana), ʻalae keʻokeʻo (Hawaiian coot, Fulica alai), āeʻo (Hawaiian stilt, Himantopus mexicanus knudseni), auʻkuʻu (black-crowned night heron, Nycticorax nycticorax), among others. The area is currently under reforestation, after the removal of non-native invasive plants. It was added to the Register of Historic Places in 1978.

=== Honokōhau ===
Honokōhau means "bay drawing dew" and refers to the ancient settlement on the south part of the park. This area can be reached via trails from the park visitor center, or from the small boat harbor access road on Kealakehe Parkway. Features include loko iʻa (Ancient Hawaiian aquaculture fishponds), kahua (house site platforms), kiʻi pōhaku (petroglyphs), hōlua (stone slides) and heiau (religious sites). The ʻAiʻopio Fishtrap is a 1.7-acre (0.69 ha) pond, with a stone wall forming an artificial enclosure along the naturally curved shoreline of a bay. Small openings allowed young fish to enter from the sea, but as they grew larger (or at low tide) they were easily caught with nets inside the trap as needed. It was designated a National Historic Landmark in 1962, and was added to the National Register of Historic Places in 1966.

== Recreation ==
Several restored trails include about one mile of the Māmalahoa Trail. It was built in the mid-19th century, and evolved over the years into the Hawaii Belt Road which encircles the entire island. The coastal trail is part of the Ala Kahakai National Historic Trail. The Honokōhau boat harbor provides a launching area for traditional canoes, fishing boats, scuba diving and snorkeling tours of the area.

== Gallery ==
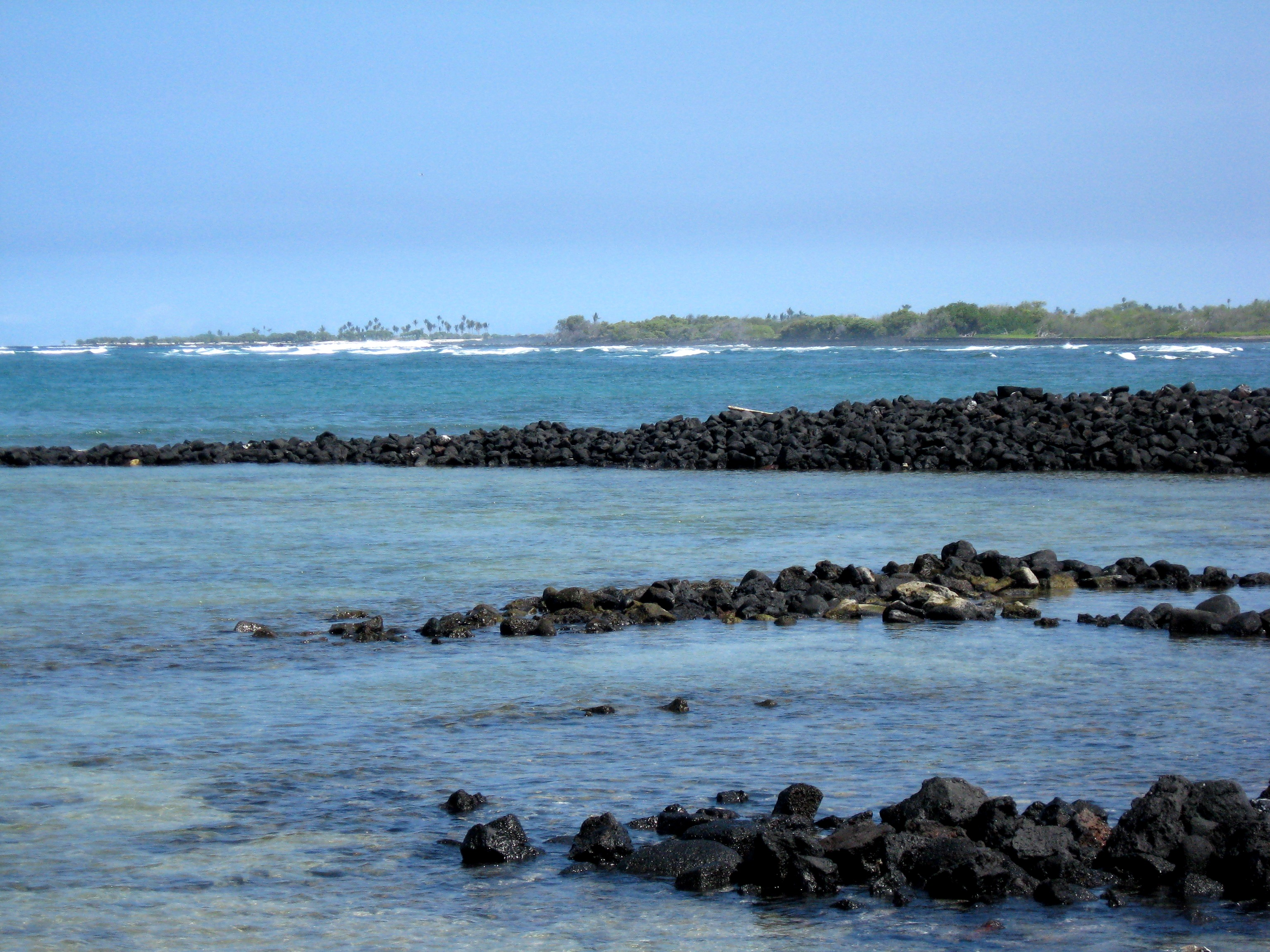
ʻAiʻopio Fish trap at Honokōhau viewed from the beach

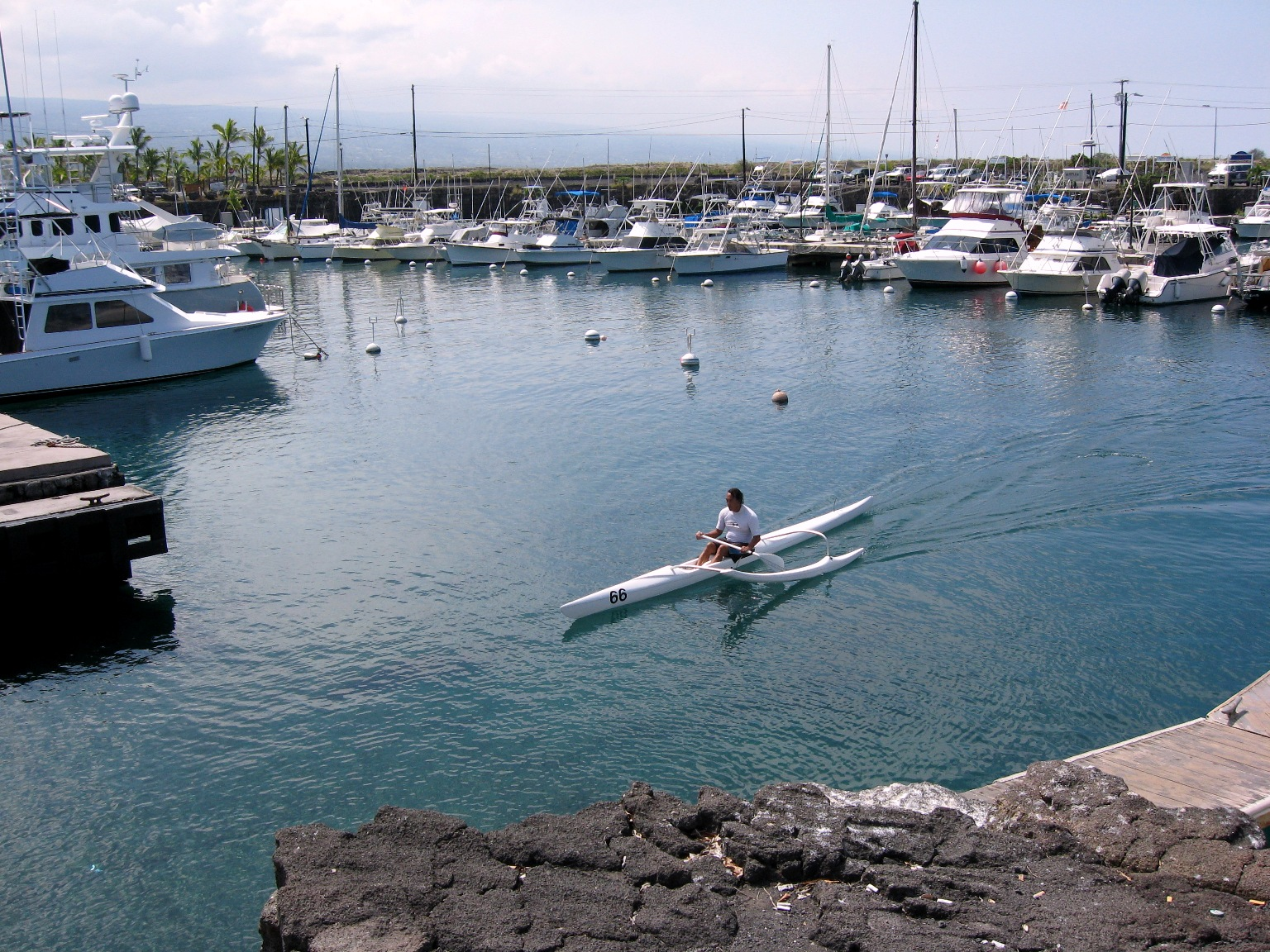
Honokōhau small boat harbor

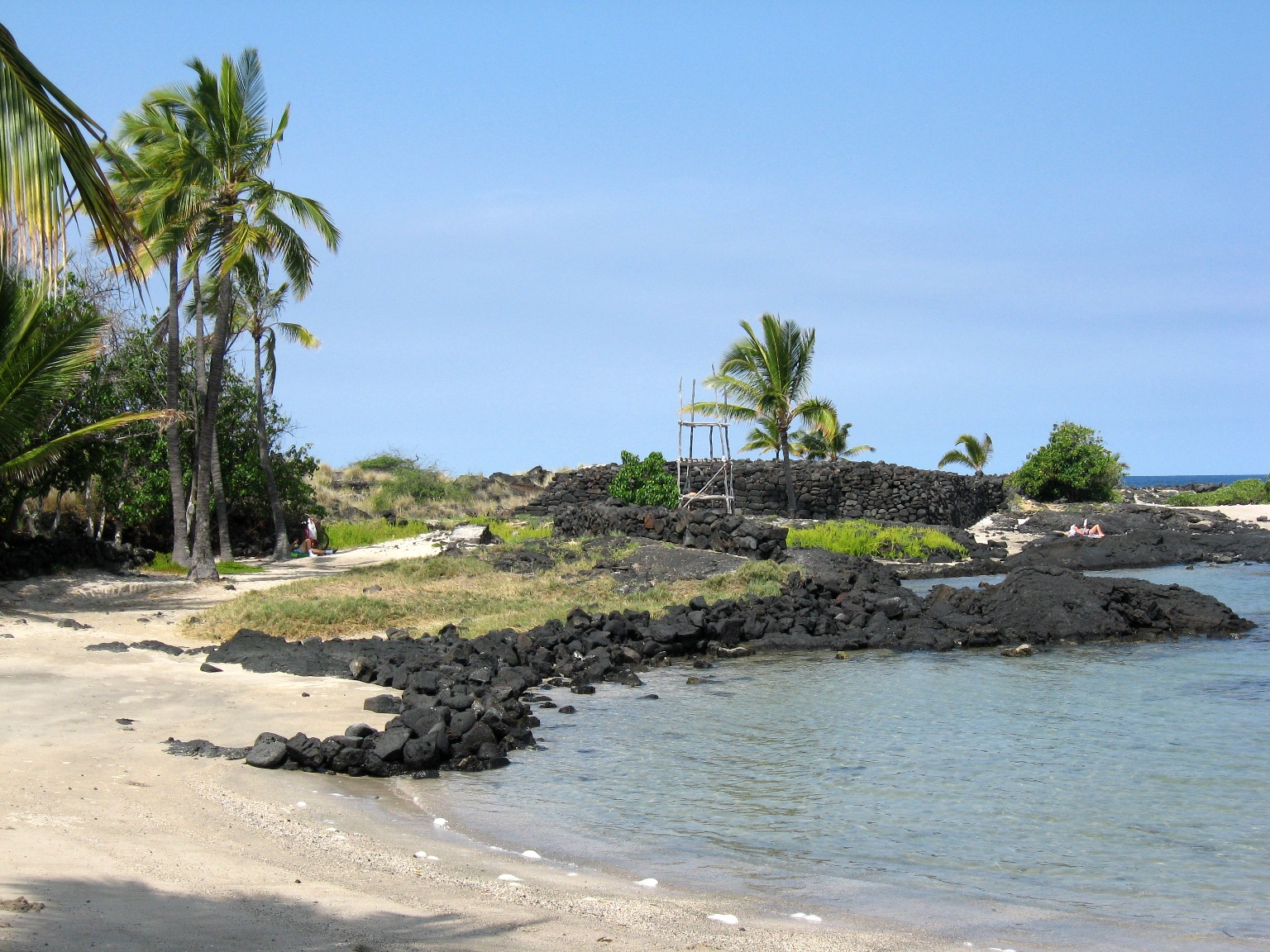
Heiau on the beach

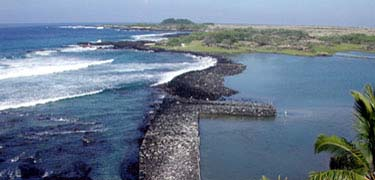
Partially restored Kaloko Fish Pond

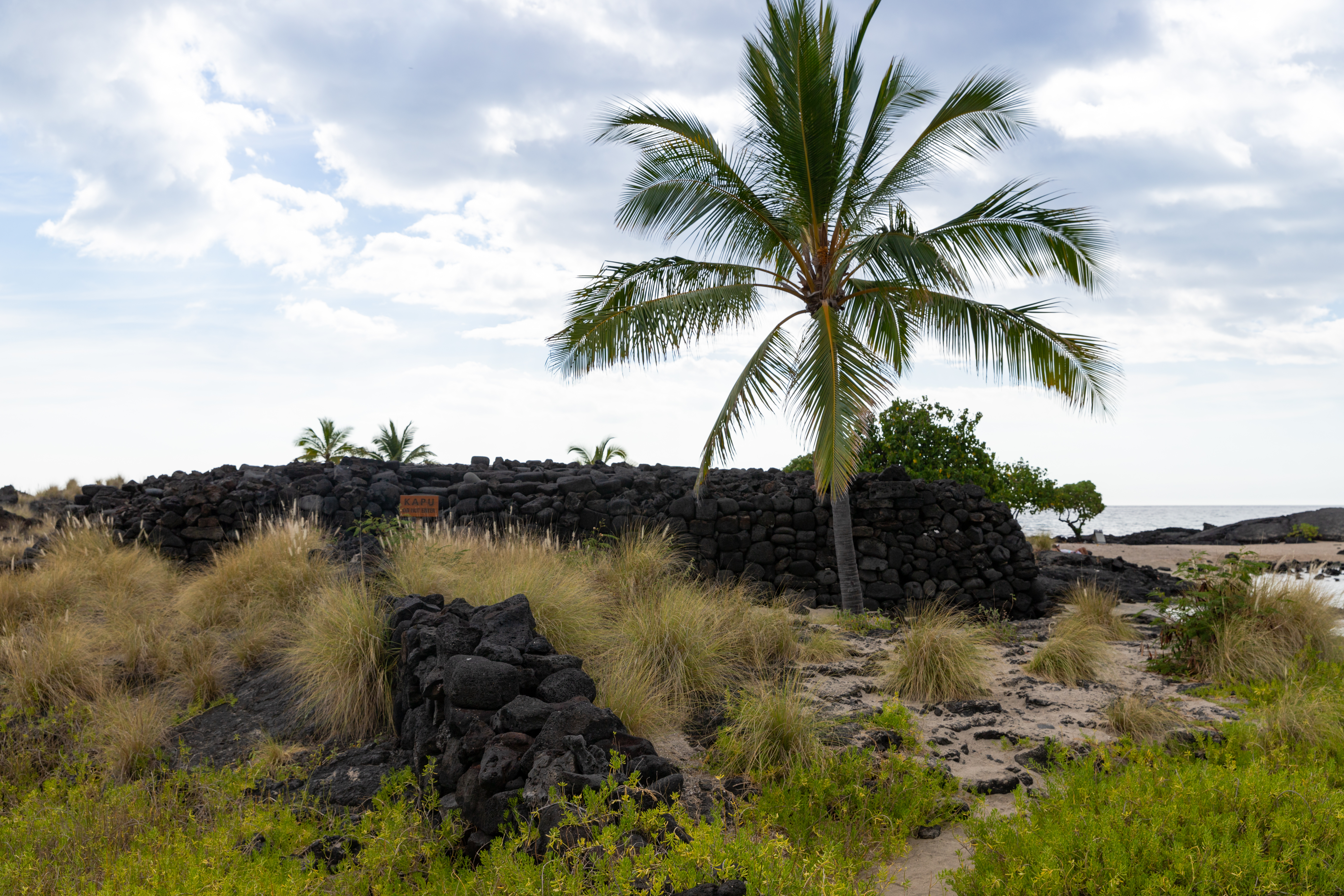
Maliu Point

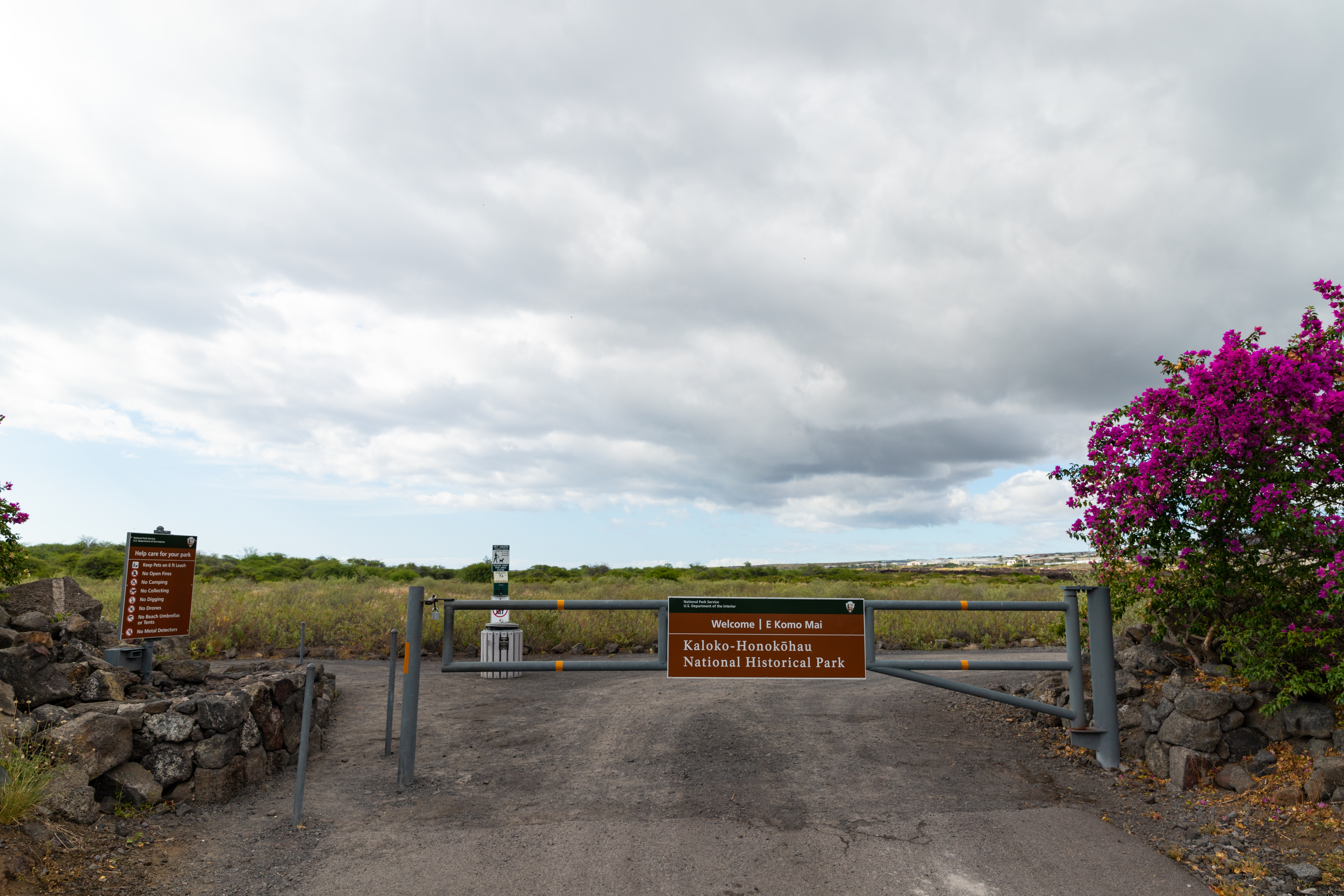
Entrance to Kaloko-Honokōhau National Historical Park
