= Keʻanae, Hawaii =

Unincorporated community in Hawaii, United States

- Unincorporated community
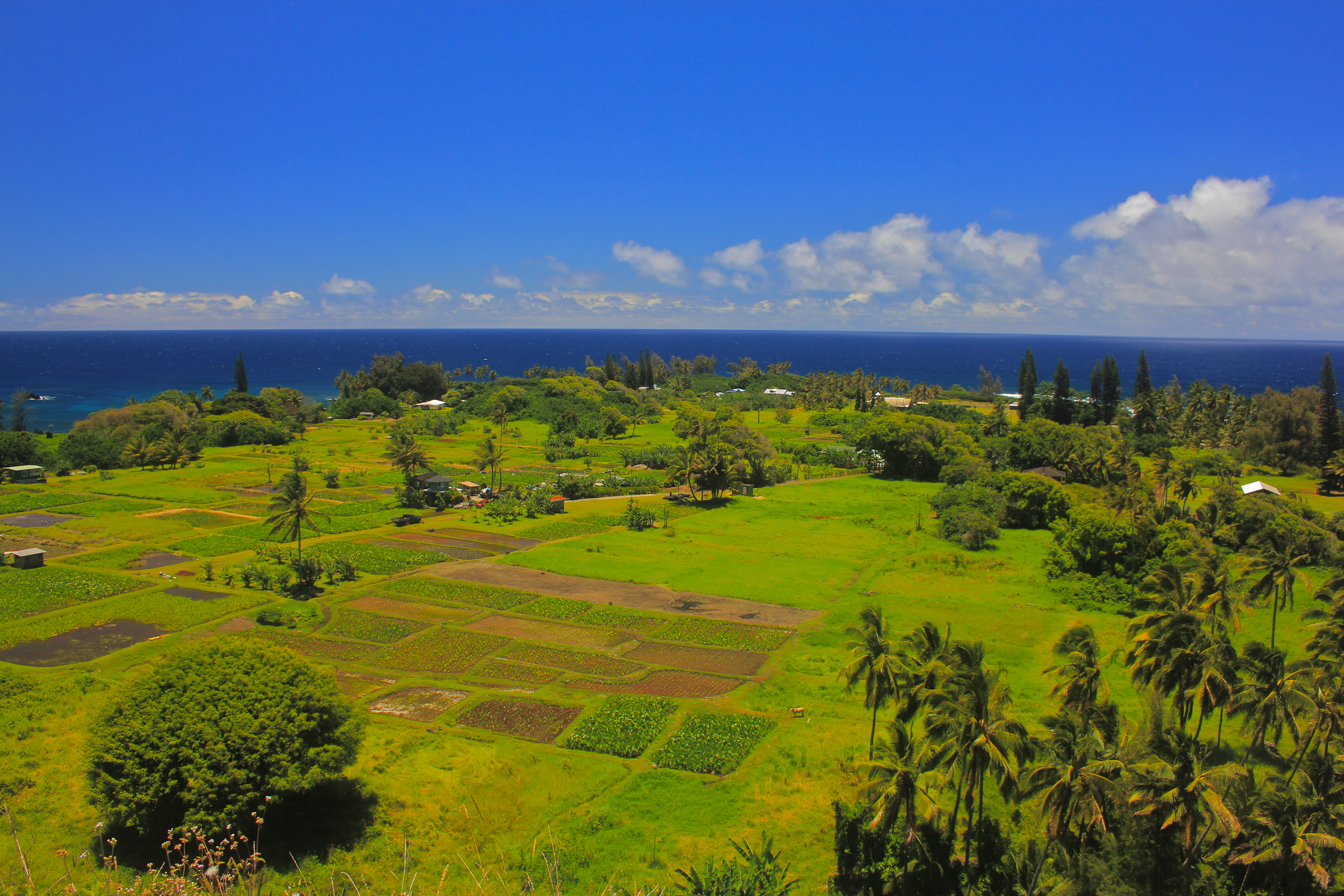

- Location within the state of Hawaii
- Coordinates: 20°51′7″N 156°8′17″W
- Country: United States
- State: Hawaii
- County: Maui
- Time zone: UTC−10 (Hawaii–Aleutian)
- ZIP codes: 96713

Keʻanae (Hawaiian for 'the mullet') is an unincorporated community in Maui County on the island of Maui in the U.S. state of Hawaii. Keʻanae is a peninsula best known for being one of Hawaii's major taro farm growing regions. Keʻanae shares the zip code of 96708 with Haʻikū. The peninsula was originally made from lava that originated from Haleakalā Crater. The area currently attracts photographers and fishermen from all around the world. Although Keʻanae is known for its scenic peninsula, it is dangerous to swim along the shore due to its sharp lava rocks.

Near Keʻanae is an old, stone church. Built in 1856, it is one of a few buildings left after the 1946 tsunami, which killed twenty-four people.

== Education ==
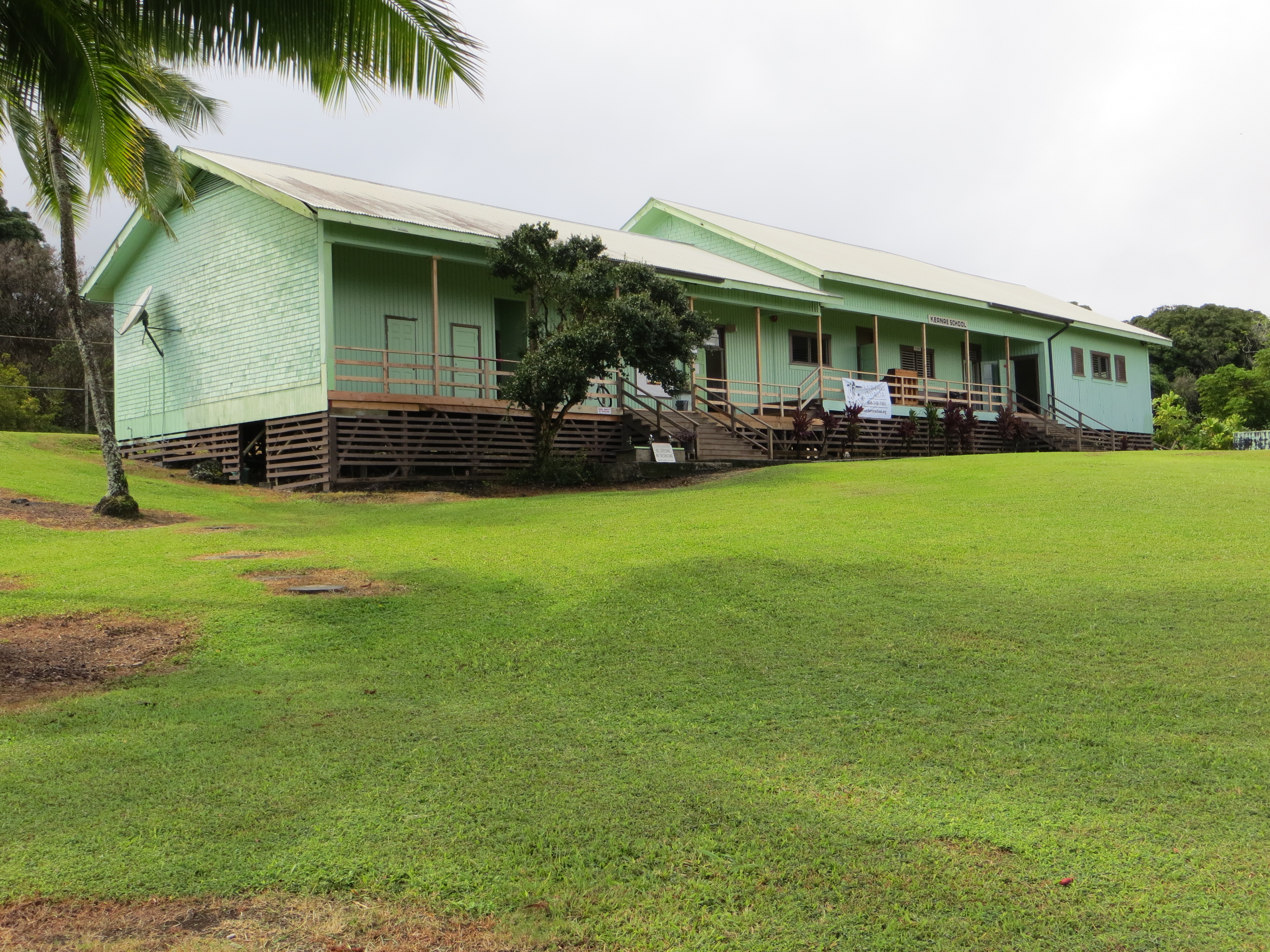
Keanae School

Hawaii Department of Education (HIDOE) operates area public schools, with students attending Hana High and Elementary School in Hana.

Ke'anae School, which had grades Kindergarten through 3 in 2005, formerly served the community. In the 2000s the average enrollment was five and enrollment in 2005 was three. In the latter year there were 15 students going to Hana, which already handled grades 4 through 12 for Keʻanae residents. In 2005 HIDOE sent the remaining Keʻanae students to Hana School to conserve resources as Keʻanae School's enrollment fell to three; classes were not held at Ke'anae School since and in 2010 HIDOE formally closed the school.

In 2010 there was a proposal for a charter school to serve Ke'anae.
