= Loʻaloʻa Heiau =

- U.S. National Register of Historic Places
- U.S. National Historic Landmark
- Hawaiʻi Register of Historic Places
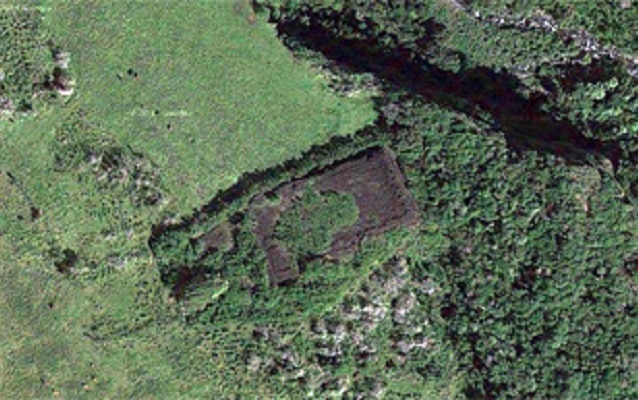
- Undated aerial photo

- Location within Hawaii
- Nearest city: Kaupo, Hawaiʻi
- Coordinates: 20°38′24″N 156°7′17″W
- Area: 1.4 acres (0.57 ha)
- Built: 1730
- NRHP reference No.: 66000301
- HRHP No.: 50-50-16-00101

Significant dates
- Added to NRHP: October 15, 1966
- Designated NHL: December 29, 1962
- Designated HRHP: October 15, 1966

Loʻaloʻa Heiau is located in Kaupo on Maui. It is one of the few remaining intact examples of a large luakini heiau (state level temple where human and other ritual sacrifice was performed). Once the center of an important cultural complex, oral tradition attributes the construction of the temple at about 1730 AD to Kekaulike, King of Maui, who lived at Kaupo and died in 1736. Its site number is HASS-50-MA-A28-1. It was excavated in 1931. It was designated a National Historic Landmark in 1962.

== Description ==
Loʻaloʻa Heiau is located in a remote rural setting of southeastern Maui, at the small community of Kaupo. It is located on private land upland from Hawaii Route 31. The heiau is a three-tiered stone platform, built on a small hill. Its apparent measurements are about 115 by 500 feet (35 m × 152 m), but there is damage at one end that precludes an accurate determination of its size without further archaeological work. The eastern end of the platform is believed to be where the ceremonial functions took place, and has terraced retaining walls as high as 20 feet (6.1 m). The western portion of the platform has been significantly disturbed, with virtually no pavement and pit holes from which trees grow. There are secondary structures around some of the edges, and it is possible that the full site (including support facilities for the temple's ceremonial functions) is much larger.

Loʻaloʻa Heiau is a well-preserved example of a state-level temple. In particular, the site's features and known oral history suggest that it includes multiple phases in the evolution of Hawaiian religious practices prior to the arrival of outsiders. At the time of European contact in the late 18th century, the Kaupo area supported a population of about 1,000. When Kamehameha I united the island chain into a single kingdom in the early 19th century, the importance of Kaupo as a civic and ceremonial center declined.

== See also ==
- List of National Historic Landmarks in Hawaii
- National Register of Historic Places listings in Maui County, Hawaii
