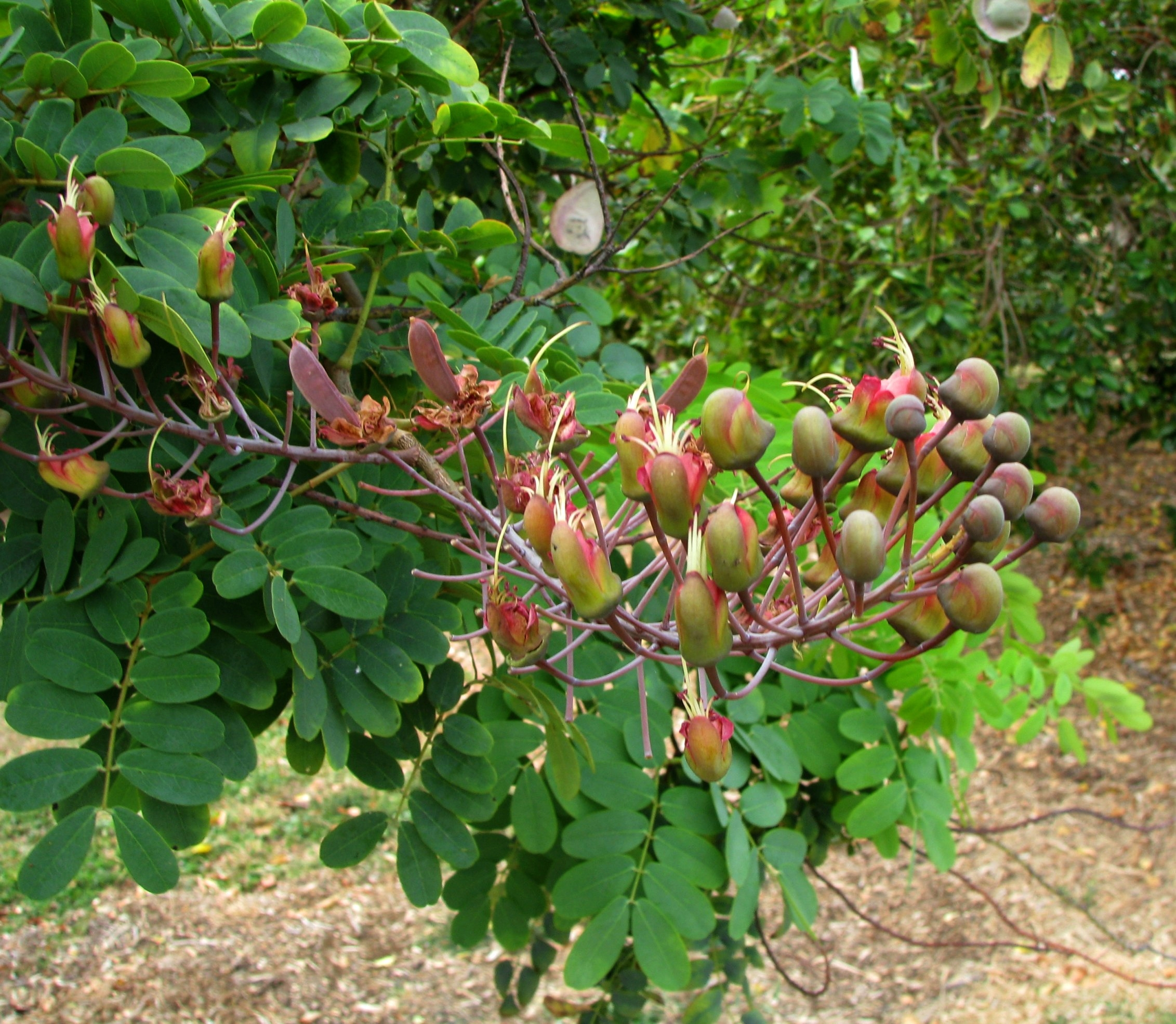

Conservation status
- Critically Endangered (IUCN 3.1)

Scientific classification
- Kingdom: Plantae
- Clade: Tracheophytes
- Clade: Angiosperms
- Clade: Eudicots
- Clade: Rosids
- Order: Fabales
- Family: Fabaceae
- Subfamily: Caesalpinioideae
- Genus: Mezoneuron
- Species: M. kauaiense

Binomial name
- Mezoneuron kauaiense (H.Mann) Hillebr.

Synonyms
- Caesalpinia kauaiensis H.Mann

= Mezoneuron kauaiense =

Species of legume

Mezoneuron kauaiense is a rare shrub or small tree in the genus Mezoneuron (pea family, Fabaceae), that is endemic to Hawaii. Common names include uhiuhi (the Big Island and Kauaʻi), kāwaʻu (Maui), and kea (Maui). It is threatened by invasive species, particularly feral ungulates.

== Description ==
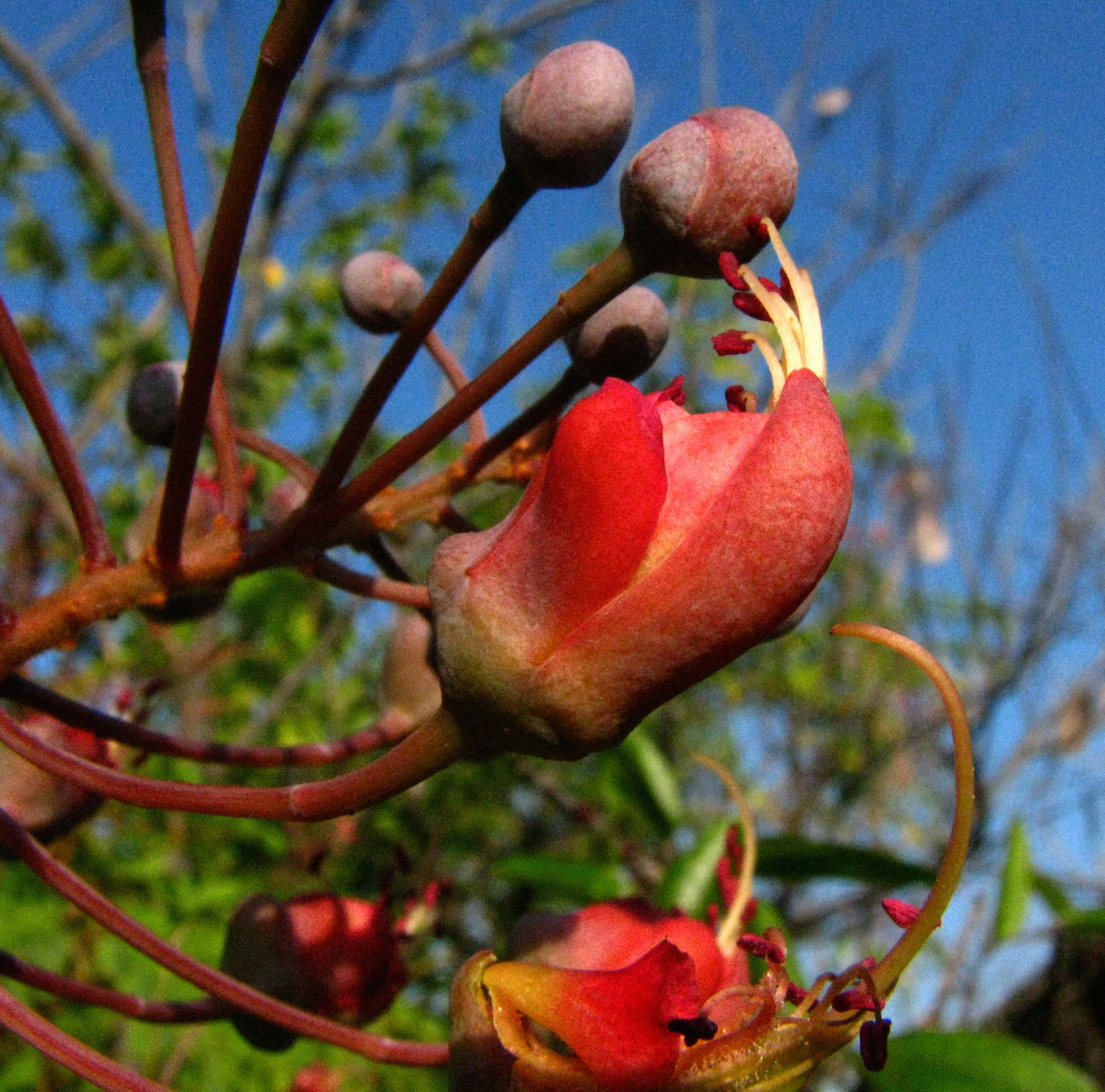
Flowers with accompanying racemes

Mezoneuron kauaiense is a shrub or small tree that reaches a height of 4–10 m (13–33 ft). The bark is dark grey and made up of rectangular or oblong platelets. The pinnate leaves are composed of 4 to 8 leaflets, each around 3 cm (1.2 in) in length. The bisexual flowers have pink to rose sepals and red anthers. They form on pink to red terminal racemes 4–7 in (10–18 cm) in length. The flat, thin seed pods are 8 cm (3.1 in) long, 5 cm (2.0 in) wide, and contain 2 to 4 oval-shaped seeds. Blooming takes place from December to March.

== Habitat ==
Uhiuhi inhabits dry, coastal mesic, and mixed mesic forests at elevations of 80–920 m (260–3,020 ft). Associated plants include lama (Diospyros sandwicensis), ʻaʻaliʻi (Dodonaea viscosa), and alaheʻe (Psydrax odorata). Populations formerly existed on Kauaʻi (Waimea Canyon), West Maui, Lānaʻi, the Big Island (North Kona District), and Oʻahu (Waiʻanae Range), but are only found in the latter two today.

== Uses ==
The wood of M. kauaiense is very dense and hard, nearly black, and close-grained. Native Hawaiians used it to make ʻōʻō (digging sticks), ihe (spears), laʻau melomelo (fishing lures), pou (house posts), runners for papa hōlua (sleds), pāhoa (daggers), laʻau palau (clubs), and laʻau kahi wauke (Broussonetia papyrifera scraping boards). The rose-colored flowers are collected to make lei. A blood purifier was made from the young leaves, leaf buds, and bark of uhiuhi mashed together with the inner bark of hāpuʻu (Cibotium spp.), ʻokolehao, ʻulu (Artocarpus altilis) bark, ʻuhaloa (Waltheria indica) taproots, and ko kea (Saccharum officinarum).

== Conservation ==
The plant is very rare today, with fewer than 100 individuals remaining in the wild, with some estimates at fewer than 50 plants. It does not reproduce very successfully, having a low level of recruitment. The plant's habitat has been degraded or destroyed by development, agriculture, and fire, and invaded by exotic species of plants and animals. The invasive fountaingrass (Pennisetum setaceum) is particularly harmful to the habitat, covering whole fields and increasing the danger of fire. The seeds are eaten by rats, and cattle and goats graze in the area. An insect, the black coffee twig borer (Xylosandrus compactus), damages the seedlings and saplings. Since the wood is so highly sought after, the trees are still in danger of being harvested. The population on the Big Island grows on the side of Hualālai, a dormant volcano, and so is technically in danger of being extirpated in the event of an eruption.

The plant was federally listed as an endangered species of the United States in 1986.
