= Kāneaka Hōlua Slide =

Historic Place in Hawaii County, Hawaii

- U.S. National Register of Historic Places
- U.S. National Historic Landmark
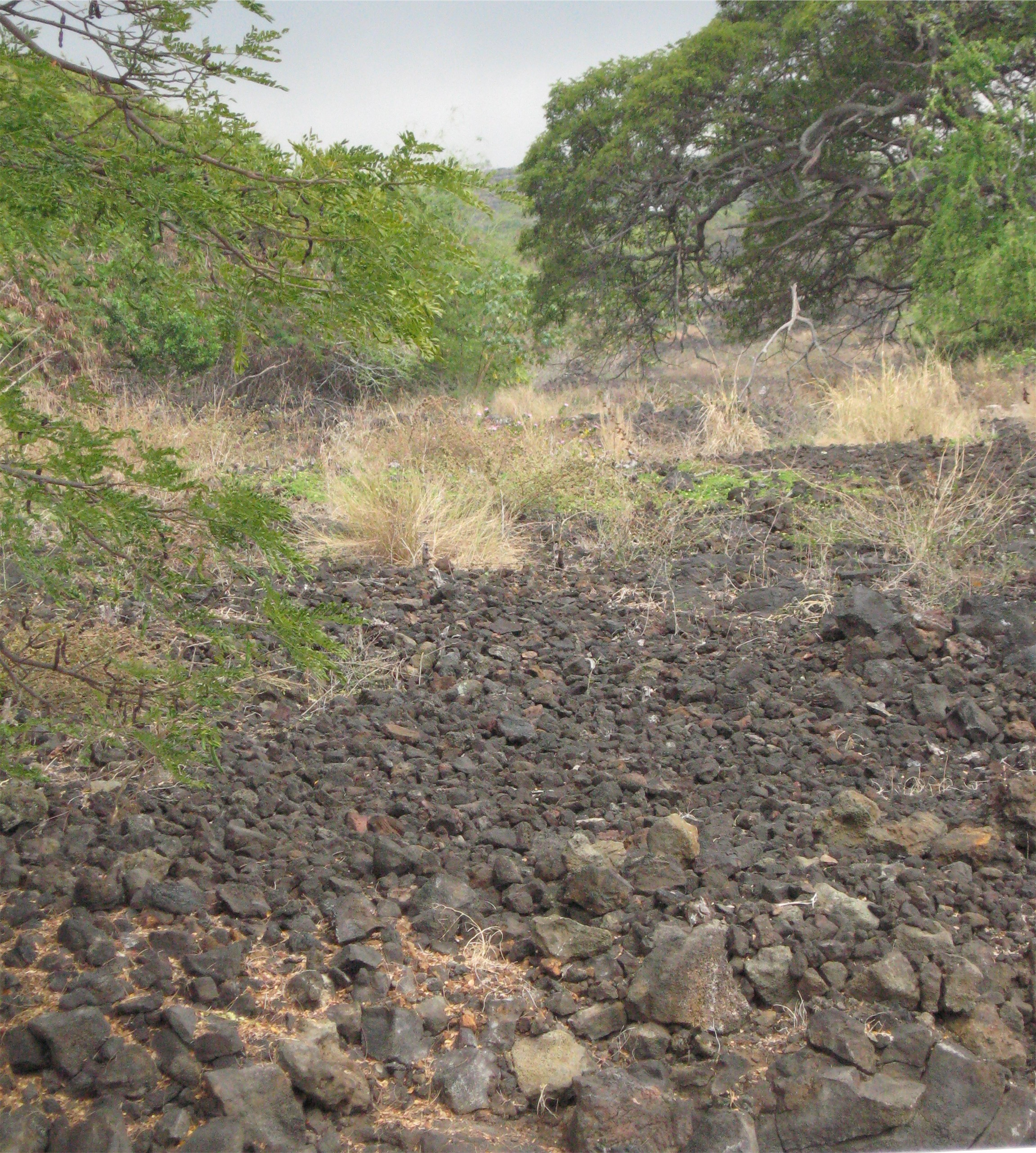

- Location within Hawaii
- Location: Aliʻi Highway, Keauhou, Hawaii
- NRHP reference No.: 66000290

Significant dates
- Added to NRHP: October 15, 1966
- Designated NHL: December 29, 1962

The Kāneaka Hōlua Slide, a.k.a. the Keauhou Hōlua Slide, is located in Keauhou (originally Kahaluʻu) on the island of Hawaiʻi. It is the largest historical hōlua course left in the islands. Hōlua slides were used in the extremely dangerous activity of sliding across solidified lava surface.

Though many had believed for years that this ritualistic practice was restricted to the aliʻi class of men, this is not the case. The majority of oral and written histories of heʻehōlua prior to missionary/western influence was inclusive of the female as well as the male nobility of ancient Hawaii. Contrary to popular belief, heʻehōlua was widely practiced among all the Kanaka Maoli community throughout the Kingdom. This particular hōlua course was primarily used for ritualistic purposes, but perhaps there were times when it was openly used. There are several burials found throughout the slide area suggesting that injuries and death were common when sliding down this particular course. The remaining length of the slide is approx. 2,600 feet (790 m) long, of the original length which was said to be over 5,280 feet (1,600 m) long. The slide course ended on the shoreline at Heʻeia Bay. Small portions of the hōlua course are still remain on the shoreline at the end of the hōlua slide where the waves meet the rock coastline. When constructed it was first layered with large slabs of pāhoehoe lava with smaller and smaller lava material added until the kahua hōlua was finished off with a fine ash surface to cover those larger pieces of lava rock. When in use, it was covered lightly with pili grass to provide a medium surface to minimize the friction between the papahōlua and lava rock surface during the practice of heʻehōlua. Today, there is one other usable kahua hōlua slide that was constructed in 2011 and is located at Turtle Bay Resort. Other than that heʻehōlua is practiced today in pastures on the high slopes of Hawaiʻi Island and Maui, as well as on groomed grass hills throughout Hawaiʻi.

The Kāneaka Hōlua Slide was connected to the Makahiki games. It can be seen from Aliʻi Highway, across from the Kona Country Club golf course clubhouse. The slide originally went into Heʻeia Bay, but the part below the road was destroyed and is now used by a golf course and vacation homes. The preserved parts above the road are best viewed from the air, e.g. satellite images at 19°33′44.43″N 155°57′30.5″W This area was used by the royal families such as the King Kamehameha III and King David Kalākaua.

By the 1950s trees and shrubs were encroaching on the sides of the slide, and sections had settled due to earthquakes. It was added to the list of National Historic Landmarks in Hawaii on December 29, 1962, and added to the National Register of Historic Places listings on the island of Hawaii on October 15, 1966. A small museum at the nearby Keauhou Shopping Center includes a reproduction of a hōlua sled and more information about the other historic sites in the area.

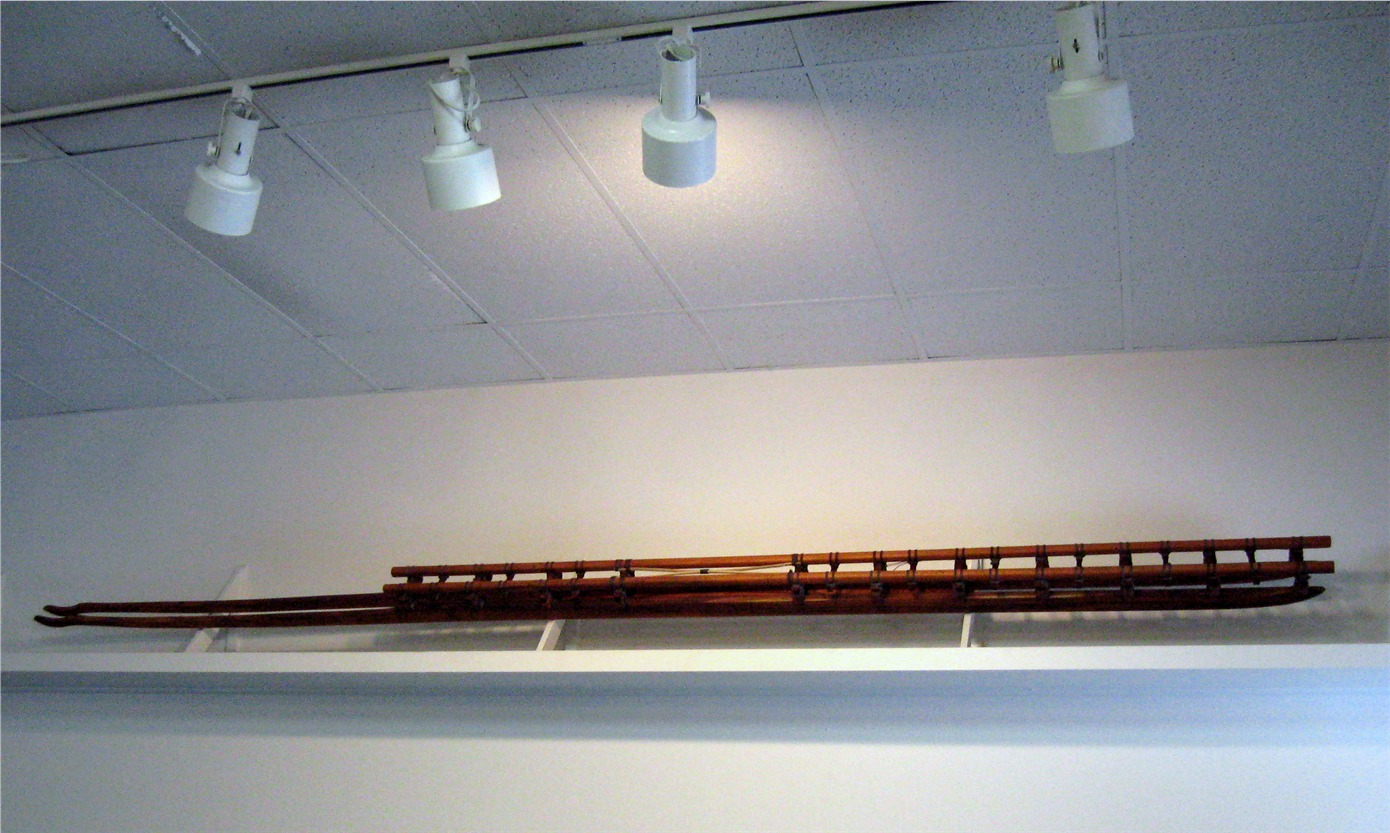
Reproduction of a sled in Keauhou museum

== See also ==
- Hawaiian lava sledding
- List of National Historic Landmarks in Hawaii
- National Register of Historic Places listings in Hawaii County, Hawaii
