= Palm Circle =

- Palm Circle Historic District
- U.S. National Register of Historic Places
- U.S. National Historic Landmark District
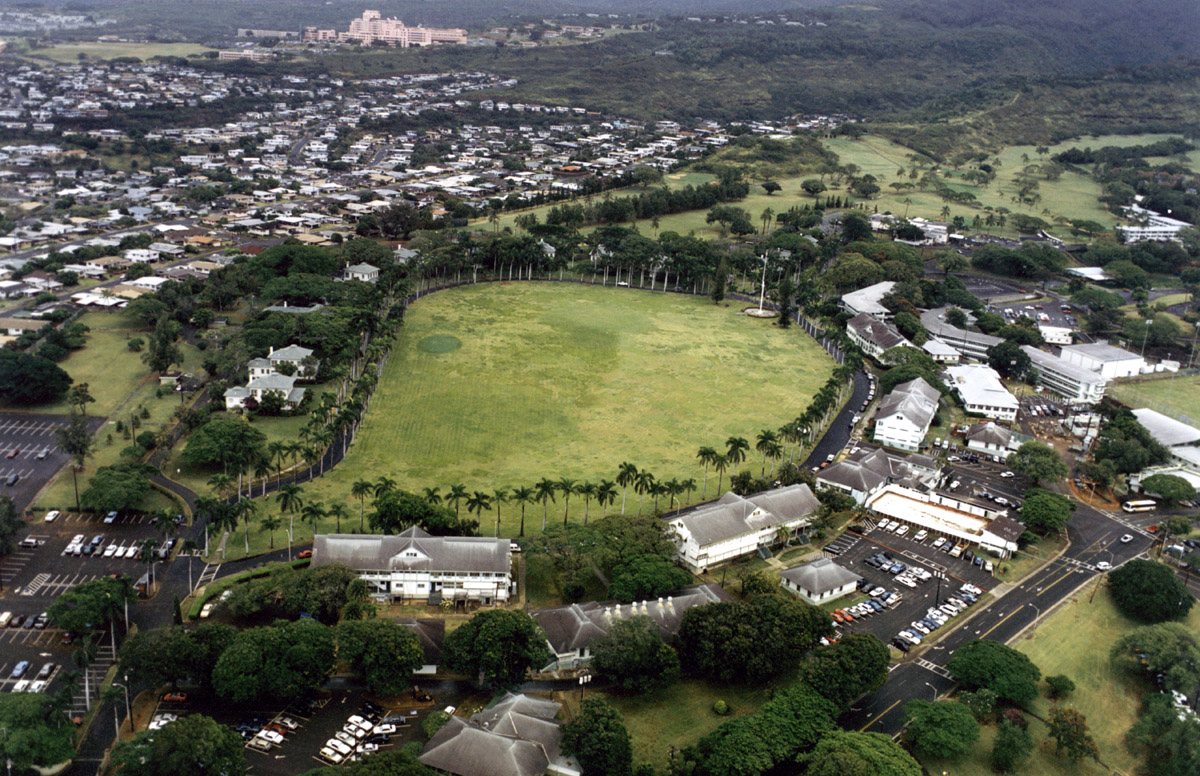

- Location within Hawaii Location within Pacific Ocean
- Location: Roughly bounded by Carter Dr., Richardson and Funston Rds., A and B Sts., Honolulu, Hawaii
- Coordinates: 21°21′0″N 157°53′25″W
- Area: 32 acres (13 ha)
- Built: 1907
- Architect: Quartermaster Corps
- NRHP reference No.: 84000104

Significant dates
- Added to NRHP: October 26, 1984
- Designated NHLD: May 28, 1987

Palm Circle or the Pineapple Pentagon, is a historic portion of Fort Shafter in Honolulu, Hawaii. Designated a National Historic Landmark in 1987, it housed the headquarters of the commanding general and his staff, U.S. Army forces, Pacific Ocean Areas, during World War II. By 1944 this command was responsible for the supply and administration of all U.S. Army personnel in the Central and South Pacific, and from 1943 to 1945, carried out logistical planning for the invasions of the Gilberts, Marshalls, Marianas, Guam, Palau, and Okinawa.

== Description ==
Palm Circle is one of the centerpieces of Fort Shafter, located north of downtown Honolulu on the east side of Interstate H-201. It is a roughly oval grassy sward, ringed by royal palms and Palm Circle Drive. Across Palm Circle Drive are buildings serving a variety of military purposes. To the north and west lie a number of officer housing units, while former barracks buildings (adapted to administrative uses) lie to the south. On the east side of the circle lie three office buildings, colloquially known as the Pineapple Pentagon, that were at the heart of the United States Army operations in the Pacific War. Richardson Hall (T-100) is the only one visible from the circle due to the steep terrain.

Fort Shafter was established in 1905, not long after the American annexation of Hawaii. Most of the officer quarters and barracks were built in the years immediately following. Following the Japanese Attack on Pearl Harbor in 1941, the Army needed to greatly expand its presence, and Richardson Hall and the other administrative buildings were built in 1943-44 to meet this demand. The buildings have multistory underground bunkers, and there are fortified service tunnels connecting them. General Robert C. Richardson Jr. ran the Army's Pacific operations from these facilities from 1943 until the end of the war.

== See also ==
- List of National Historic Landmarks in Hawaii
- National Register of Historic Places in Oahu
