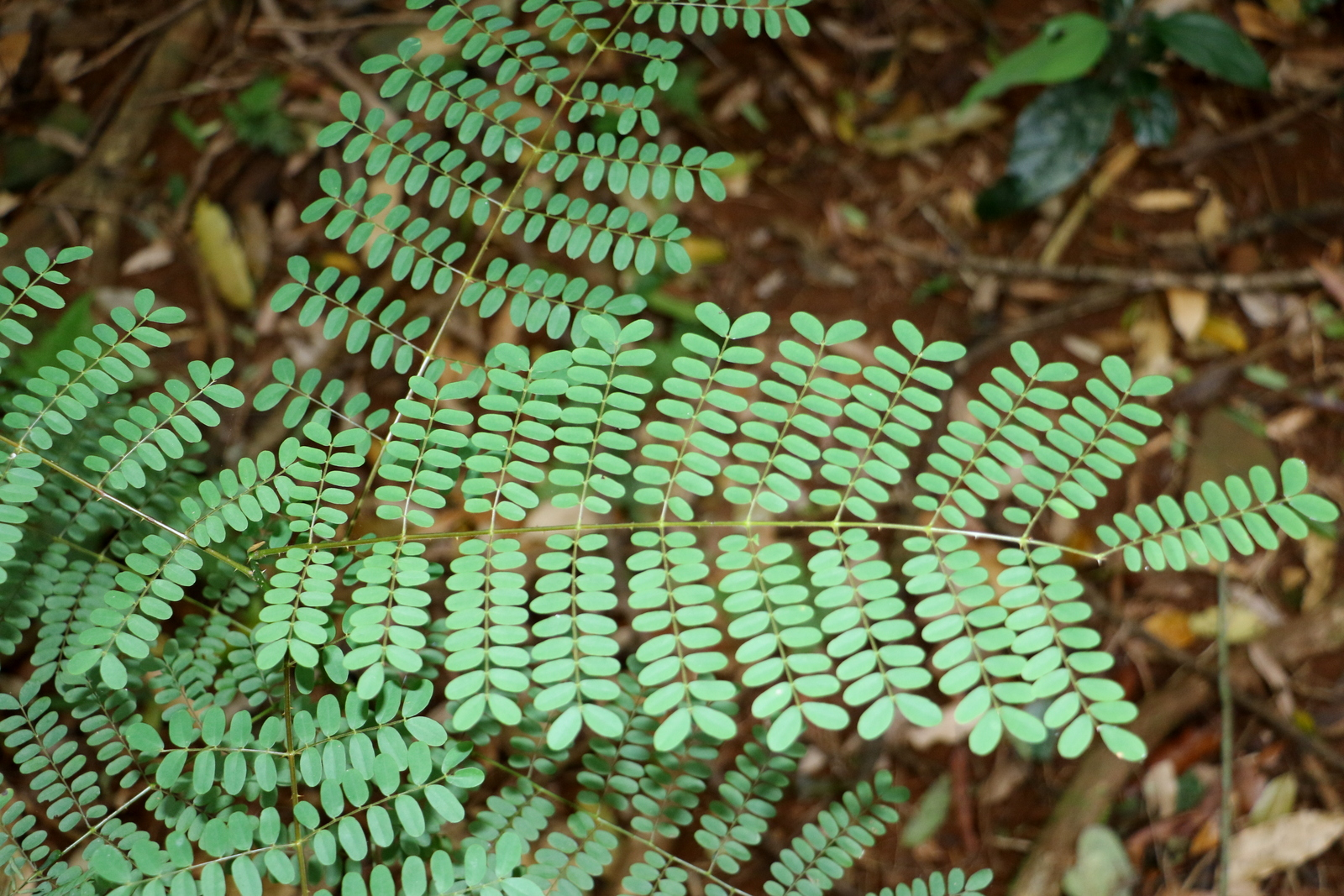
- Mary Cairncross Reserve, Australia

Scientific classification
- Kingdom: Plantae
- Clade: Tracheophytes
- Clade: Angiosperms
- Clade: Eudicots
- Clade: Rosids
- Order: Fabales
- Family: Fabaceae
- Subfamily: Caesalpinioideae
- Genus: Mezoneuron
- Species: M. brachycarpum

Binomial name
- Mezoneuron brachycarpum Pedley

Synonyms
- Caesalpinia subtropica

= Mezoneuron brachycarpum =

corky prickle vine

Species of climbing plant

Mezoneuron brachycarpum, the corky prickle vine is a species of climbing plant found in eastern Australia. A large woody vine with bipinnate foliage.
