= Hana High and Elementary School =

Public school in Hawaii, United States

Coordinates: 20.776954°N 155.999608°W

Hāna High and Elementary School is a public school in Hana, Hawaii. A part of the Hawaii Department of Education (HIDOE), it was established in 1912 and serves kindergarten through twelfth grade.

The campus boasts an untitled 1977 copper and bronze sculpture by Bumpei Akaji.

== History ==
Circa 1964 HIDOE closed the Kaupo School in Kaupo due to low enrollment and moved the students to Hana School. In 1982 some landslides that happened that year obstructed the road to Kaupo, so Kaupo students were briefly taught at Kaupo School until the road reopened.

In 2005 Hana School had 364 students, with 15 of them being residents of Keanae. At the time that community had its own school for grades Kindergarten through 3, Keanae School. That year Rick Paul, principal of Hana School, was also principal of Keanae School. In 2005 Ron Okamura, the superintendent of the Maui division of HIDOE, and Paul jointly decided to send the three students who officially registered at Keanae School to Hana School to conserve resources, although Keanae School was not formally closed. According to Paul, Hana would have had one fewer teacher in a grade level if the Keanae building had not closed, as there would have been an insufficient number of students in a particular grade level at Hana School. Classes were not held at Keanae School since and in 2010 HIDOE formally closed Keanae School.
