= Mezoneuron sumatranum =

Scientific classification
- Kingdom: Plantae
- Clade: Tracheophytes
- Clade: Angiosperms
- Clade: Eudicots
- Clade: Rosids
- Order: Fabales
- Family: Fabaceae
- Subfamily: Caesalpinioideae
- Genus: Mezoneuron
- Species: M. sumatranum

Binomial name
- Mezoneuron sumatranum (Roxb.) Wight & Arn.

Synonyms
- Caesalpinia sumatrana Roxb.; Mezoneuron sulfureum Miq.; Mezoneuron peekelii Harms; Mezoneuron koordersii Backer

Species of legume

Mezoneuron sumatranum is a leguminous species first described by William Roxburgh. No subspecies are listed in the Catalogue of Life. This and a number of similar species are called "cat's claw" lianas: recognisable by raised spines on stems and found in tropical forests of the Indian subcontinent (including Sri Lanka), Indochina, Malesia and Papua New Guinea.
