= Mezoneuron andamanicum =

Scientific classification
- Kingdom: Plantae
- Clade: Tracheophytes
- Clade: Angiosperms
- Clade: Eudicots
- Clade: Rosids
- Order: Fabales
- Family: Fabaceae
- Subfamily: Caesalpinioideae
- Genus: Mezoneuron
- Species: M. andamanicum

Binomial name
- Mezoneuron andamanicum Prain

Synonyms
- Mezoneuron kunstleri Prain; Caesalpinia andamanica (Prain)Hattink; Mezoneuron andamanica Prain

Species of legume

Mezoneuron andamanicum is a species of 'cat's claw' lianas, previously placed in the genus Caesalpinia, in the tribe Caesalpinieae. This species is recorded from the Andaman Islands, Indo-China and Malesia, with no subspecies.
