= Ahu A ʻUmi Heiau =

Historic Place in Hawaii County, Hawaii

- Ahua A ʻUmi Heiau
- U.S. National Register of Historic Places
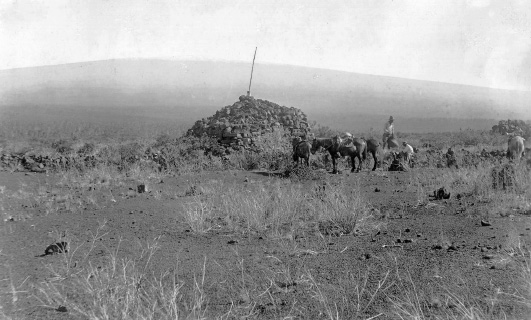
- A portion of the site, circa 1890

- Location within Hawaii
- Location: North Kona
- Coordinates: 19°38′13″N 155°47′1″W
- Area: 5 acres (2.0 ha)
- Built: 1449-1500
- Architectural style: Ancient Hawaiian
- NRHP reference No.: 74000343
- Added to NRHP: August 13, 1974

Ahu A ʻUmi Heiau means "shrine at the temple of ʻUmi" in the Hawaiian Language. It is also spelled "ahu-a-Umi", or known as Ahua A ʻUmi Heiau, which would mean "mound of ʻUmi". It was built for ʻUmi-a-Liloa, often called ʻUmi, who ruled the island of Hawaiʻi early in the 16th century. He moved the seat of government here from the Waipiʻo Valley. The seat of power generally remained in the Kona District until the plantation days hundreds of years later. Ahu A ʻUmi Heiau was also the place where the great chief Keawenuiaʻumi (the son of ʻUmi) hid to escape death from a strong aliʻi, Kalepuni, who attempted to take over Keawe's rule. The site was an enclosure surrounded by a number of stone cairns, up to four meters high and seven meters in diameter.

It is unusual to be built so far inland, on the high and dry plateau between Mauna Loa and Hualālai. In the 19th century the site was built into a corral, but parts remain intact. The Judd Trail was begun in 1849 to create a direct route between Kailua and Hilo near the site, but trail completion was abandoned after the Mauna Loa eruption of 1859 crossed the route. Otherwise the area, and elevation of over 5,000 feet (1,500 m), is not easily accessed today. A number of trails with traditional names mentioning King ʻUmi's probably existed in that time. Some of these have been proposed to be restored into a Mauna Loa trail system.

The site is on the state register of historic places as site number 10-29-3810. It was added to the National Register of Historic Places on August 13, 1974, as site number 74000343. It is located in the upper elevations of the ahupuaʻa (traditional land division) called Keauhou 2. Modern research proposes that the complex includes an astronomical direction register.
