= Mezoneuron nhatrangense =

Conservation status
- Vulnerable (IUCN 2.3)

Scientific classification
- Kingdom: Plantae
- Clade: Tracheophytes
- Clade: Angiosperms
- Clade: Eudicots
- Clade: Rosids
- Order: Fabales
- Family: Fabaceae
- Subfamily: Caesalpinioideae
- Genus: Mezoneuron
- Species: M. nhatrangense

Binomial name
- Mezoneuron nhatrangense Gagnep.

Synonyms
- Caesalpinia nhatrangense (Gagnep.) J.E.Vidal

Species of plant

Mezoneuron nhatrangense is a species of legume in the family Fabaceae. It is found only in Vietnam.
