= Mezoneuron hymenocarpum =

Scientific classification
- Kingdom: Plantae
- Clade: Tracheophytes
- Clade: Angiosperms
- Clade: Eudicots
- Clade: Rosids
- Order: Fabales
- Family: Fabaceae
- Subfamily: Caesalpinioideae
- Genus: Mezoneuron
- Species: M. hymenocarpum

Binomial name
- Mezoneuron hymenocarpum Wight & Arn. ex Prain

Synonyms
- Caesalpinia hymenocarpa (Prain)Hattink; Mezoneuron pubescens sensu Baker; Mezoneuron laoticum Gagnep.

Species of legume

Mezoneuron hymenocarpum is a species of 'cat's claw' lianas, previously placed in the genus Caesalpinia, in the tribe Caesalpinieae. Records are from: India, Indo-China, Malesia through to Australia, with no subspecies.
