= Mezoneuron pubescens =

Scientific classification
- Kingdom: Plantae
- Clade: Tracheophytes
- Clade: Angiosperms
- Clade: Eudicots
- Clade: Rosids
- Order: Fabales
- Family: Fabaceae
- Subfamily: Caesalpinioideae
- Genus: Mezoneuron
- Species: M. pubescens

Binomial name
- Mezoneuron pubescens Desf.

Synonyms
- Mezoneuron pubescens var. longipes Craib; Caesalpinia pubescens (Desf.) Hattink; Mezoneuron glabrum Desf. Caesaplinia ignota Blanco

Species of legume

Mezoneuron pubescens is the type species of 'cat's claw' lianas in its genus; it was placed previously in the genus Caesalpinia and remains in the tribe Caesalpinieae. This species is recorded from Malesia and Indo-China. with no subspecies.
