= Keauhou, Hawaii =

Unincorporated community in Hawaii, United States

Keauhou
- Unincorporated community
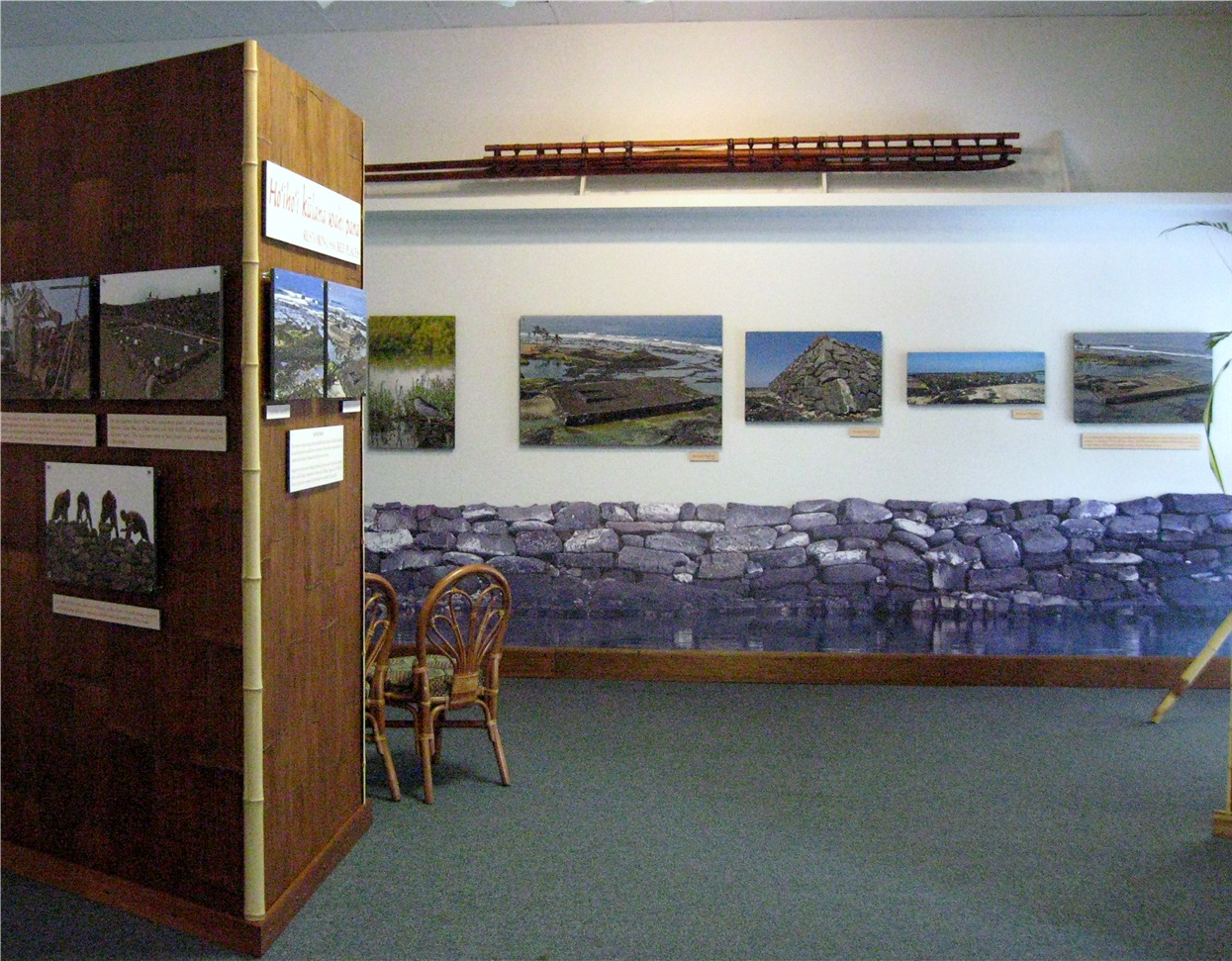
- A small museum in the Keauhou shopping center

- Location within the state of Hawaii
- Coordinates: 19°33′55″N 155°57′54″W
- Country: United States
- State: Hawaii
- County: Hawaii
- Elevation: 13 ft (4.0 m)
- Time zone: UTC−10 (Hawaii–Aleutian)
- ZIP codes: 96739
- GNIS feature ID: 361017

Keauhou is an unincorporated community on the island of Hawaii in Hawaii County, Hawaii, United States. Its elevation is 13 feet (4 m). Because the community has borne multiple names, the Board on Geographic Names officially designated it "Keauhou" in 1914. It has a post office with the ZIP code 96739. The post office is a contract station only; people who live in the community use the zip code of 96740 or 96725.

Historic areas near Keauhou include Keauhou Bay, where Kamehameha III was born, Kahaluu Bay directly North, and Ahu A Umi Heiau in the uplands. The Keauhou Holua Slide is a National Historic Landmark. The post office and a small museum are located in the Keauhou Shopping Center.
