= Kaupo, Hawaii =

Kaupō
- Moku
- Kaupō
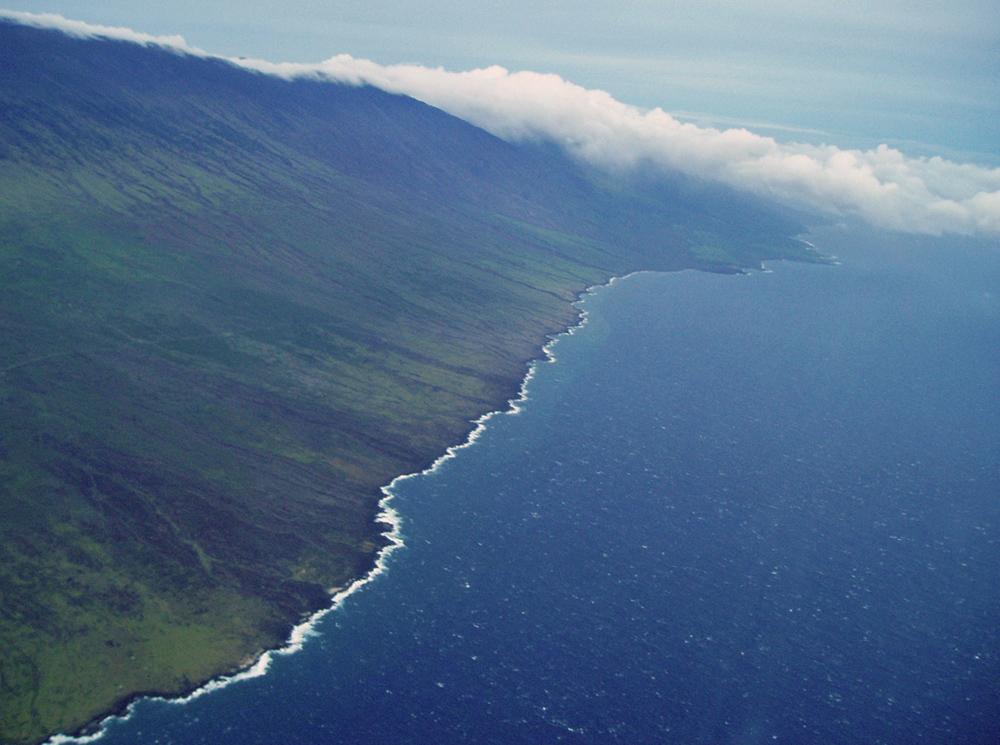
- Coastline
- Interactive map of Kaupō
- Coordinates: 20°38′33.28″N 156°7′51.60″W
- Country: United States
- State: Hawaii
- County: Maui
- Website

Kaupō is a district of ancient Hawaii (moku in the Hawaiian language) of Maui island in Hawaii. Kaupō is now a remote, sparsely populated, sustainable ranching community.

== Geography ==
Kaupō is located along the southeastern shore of Maui, west of Kīpahulu along the Kahikinui coastline. Kaupō is located on a rugged and desolate coast. The Kahikinui Forest Reserve is located in the area, as well as a section of Haleakalā National Park. A trail leads from near the summit of Haleakalā through Kaupō Gap to the coast. This trail has been designated as a National Recreation Trail.

Kaupō is connected to the rest of the island via the Pi'ilani Highway (Hawaii Route 31). The highway is primarily one lane wide and is not paved in all sections.

== History ==
The ancient district of Kaupō, before 1859.

Kaupō was "Wahipana" (Special Place) for ancient Hawaiians. In the early 1900s many families lived in Kaupō. Fishing, farming, hunting and ranching were primary occupations. In 1859 the district was combined with that of Hana.

The Loaloa Heiau and Huialoha Church are located there.

== Education ==
Residents are served by public schools of the Hawaii Department of Education (HIDOE).

Kaupo School served the community from its 1923 opening until the 1960s. By 1964 the number of students was five, so the HIDOE closed the school with Hana High and Elementary School in Hana taking the students. The school reopened in circa 1982 as some landslides that happened that year obstructed the road to Hana. Kaupo School later closed when the road reopened.
