= Luakini =

Native Hawaiian sacred place where people were sacrificed

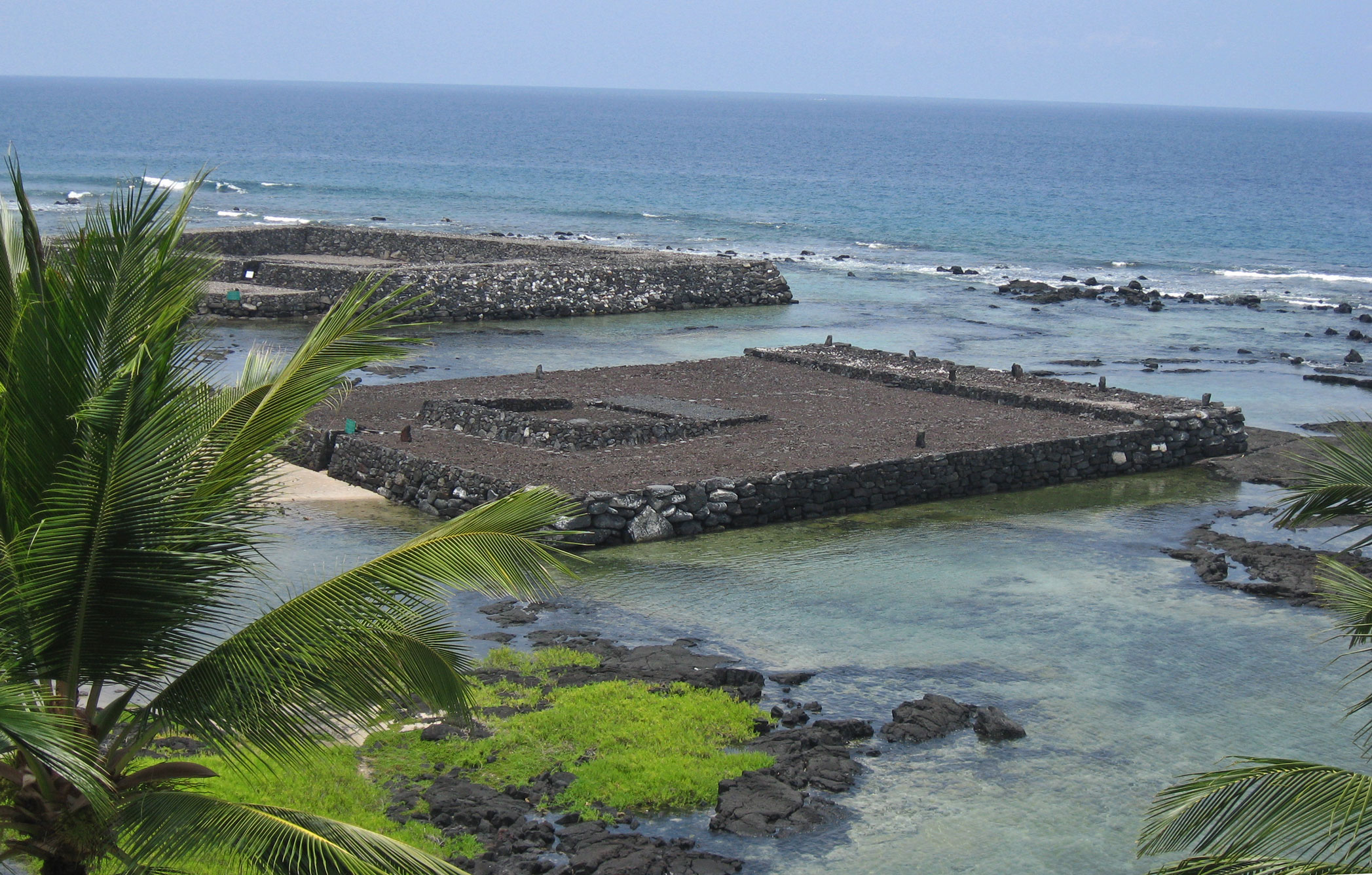
Hāpaialiʻi and Keʻeku Heiau (above, left) on Kahaluʻu Bay

In ancient Hawaii, a luakini temple, or luakini heiau, was a Native Hawaiian sacred place where human and animal blood sacrifices were offered.

In Hawaiian tradition, luakini heiaus were first established by Paʻao, a legendary priest credited with establishing many of the rites and symbols typical of the stratified high chieftainships of the immediate pre-European-contact period.

List of currently known or reputed luakini heiaus:

Kauai

- Wailua Complex of Heiaus

Oʻahu:

- Puʻu O Mahuka, "Hill of Escape"

Maui:

- Loaloa Heiau

Big Island of Hawaiʻi:

- Puʻukohola National Historic Site
- Moʻokini, birthplace of Kamehameha I
- Aha'ula (now engulfed by lava)
- Keʻeku Heiau on Kahaluʻu Bay
