= Commander in Chief Pacific Fleet Headquarters (World War II) =

Military building in Pearl Harbor, Hawaii

- CINCPAC Headquarters
- U.S. National Register of Historic Places
- U.S. National Historic Landmark
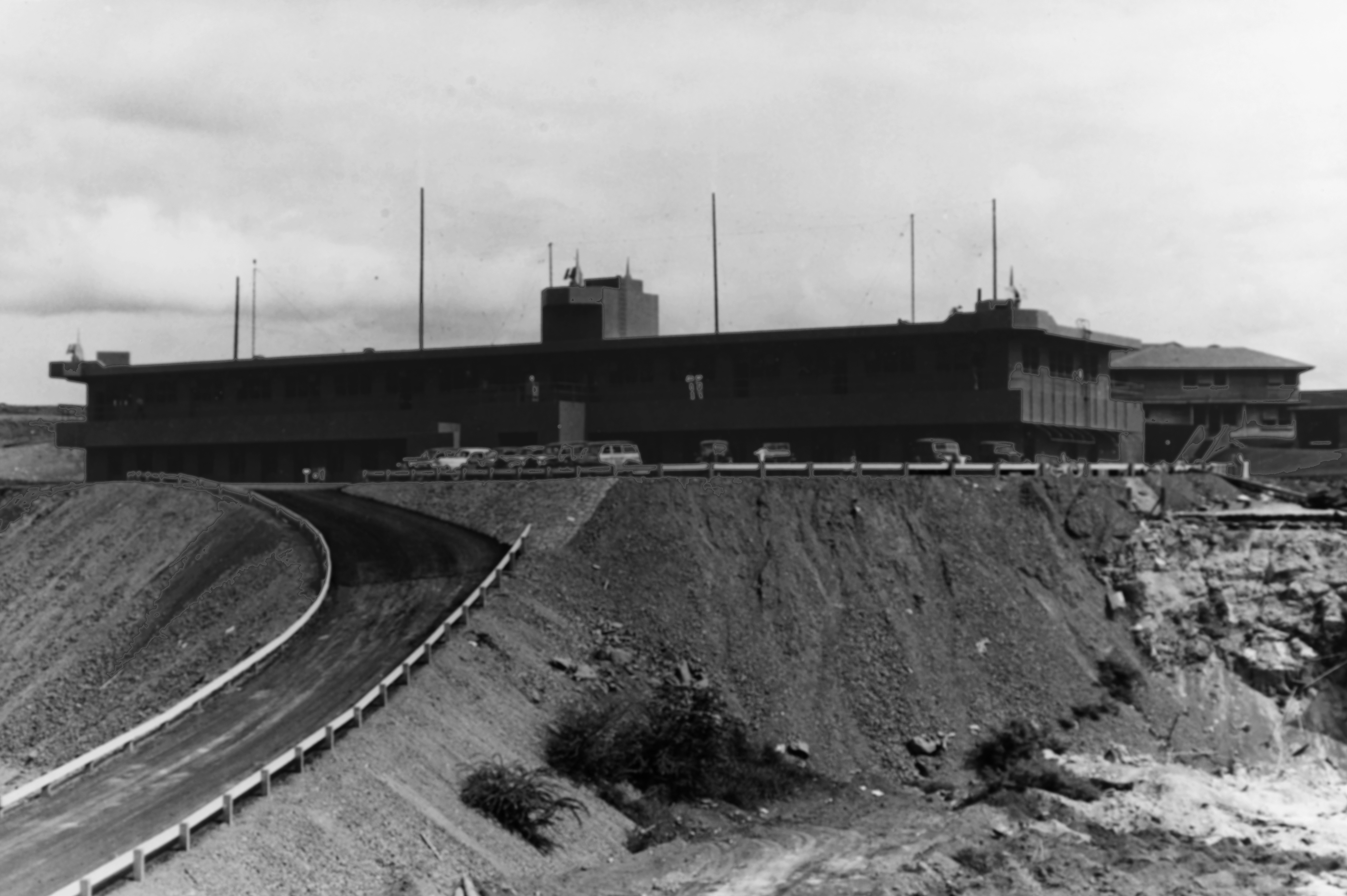
- 1942 Naval Photograph

- Location within Hawaii
- Location: Joint Base Pearl Harbor–Hickam, Pearl Harbor, Hawaii
- Coordinates: 21°21′45″N 157°56′08″W
- Area: less than one acre
- Built: 1942
- NRHP reference No.: 87001295

Significant dates
- Added to NRHP: May 28, 1987
- Designated NHL: May 28, 1987

CINCPAC Fleet Headquarters, also known as Commander in Chief Pacific Fleet Headquarters or COMPACFLT Headquarters, is a historic military building on Makalapa Drive in Joint Base Pearl Harbor–Hickam, on the island of Oahu in the US state of Hawaii. Built during World War II in 1942, it served as the headquarters of Admiral Chester W. Nimitz from 1942 through 1945, while he was Commander-in-Chief, Pacific Fleet and Commander-in-Chief, Pacific Ocean Areas, during World War II. Commanding land, sea, and air forces, Admiral Nimitz had major responsibility for campaigns such as the Battle of Midway, the liberation of Guam, and the seizure of Saipan and Tinian in the Marianas. It was designated a National Historic Landmark for this role in 1987.

== Description and history ==
The CINCPAC Fleet Headquarters building is located in the portion of Joint Base Pearl Harbor–Hickam that is between Interstate H1 to the east and the Kamehameha Highway. It is set on the north side of Makalapa Drive, overlooking the lower reaches of Halawa Stream. It is a reinforced concrete structure, three stories in height and measuring about 60 by 200 feet (18 m × 61 m). Its lower floor functions as a basement, and was bombproof by design when built. The upper floors are ringed by lanais, eliminating the need for indoor corridors.

The building was constructed in 1942, as part of a massive wartime construction program at Pearl Harbor. The Makalapa area, where it stands, was developed to house many thousands of naval personnel en route to assignments in the Pacific War. The Navy's plans included three non-residential buildings: this headquarters building, and two nearby that housed intelligence and communications facilities. Admiral Chester Nimitz occupied an office in this building until 1945, when he relocated his headquarters to Guam to more closely manage the later stages of the war.

The building now serves again as the headquarters of the US Navy Pacific Fleet.

== See also ==
- List of National Historic Landmarks in Hawaii
- National Register of Historic Places in Oahu
