= Hawaiian lava sledding =

Traditional Hawaiian sliding sport

Hawaiian lava sledding (Hawaiian: heʻe hōlua, "sled surfing") is a traditional sport of the Native Hawaiians. Similar to wave surfing, heʻe hōlua involves the use of a narrow (12 ft or 3.7 m long, 6 in or 15 cm wide) wooden sled (papa hōlua). The sled is used standing up, lying down, or kneeling, to ride down man-made or naturally occurring courses (kahua hōlua) of rock, often reaching speeds of 50 mph (80 km/h) or greater. In the past, Hawaiian lava sledding was considered both a sport and a religious ritual for honoring the gods.

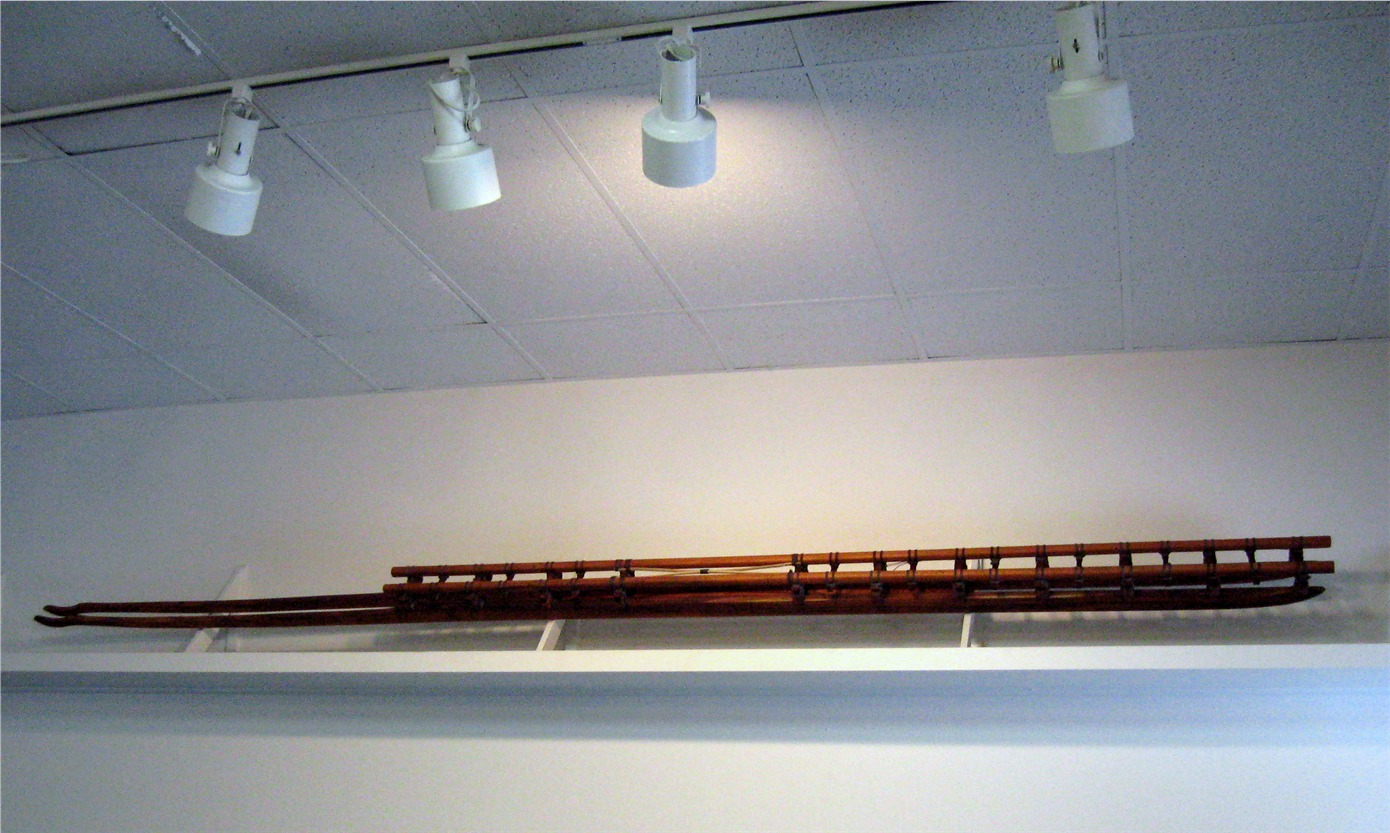
Reproduction of a sled in Keauhou museum

== Sleds ==
Papa hōlua are composed of a pair of runners and a superstructure (platform). The runners are made from hard native woods, traditionally that of kauila (Alphitonia ponderosa or Colubrina oppositifolia), uhiuhi (Caesalpinia kavaiensis), or māmane (Sophora chrysophylla). The runners have up-curved fore edges, straight aft edges, and rounded lower edges. Crosspieces keep the runners apart. The superstructure, two rails smaller in diameter than the runners and spaced apart by pieces of bamboo, sits on top of the crosspieces. The runners, crosspieces, and rails are bound together with sennit cordage. The rails are wrapped in white kapa cloth and the rail frame is covered in lauhala matting. Oil from kukui (Aleurites moluccana) nuts coats either the course or the runners to provide lubrication.

== Courses ==
A kahua hōlua foundation, which is made of rocks, is built in a depression on a hillside. The foundation is covered in packed-in dirt and an outer layer of pili grass (Heteropogon contortus) or kō (Saccharum officinarum) flower tassels. Courses are wide enough for a single sled and are not sloped at the bottom. A skilled rider can travel 150–200 yd (140–180 m) on the course, reaching the flat portion. Kāneaka Hōlua Slide is the largest extant course on the island of Hawai'i, located in Keauhou, directly east of the Ali'i Highway and roughly leading up to Keauhou Bay.
