= ʻUalapuʻe, Hawaii =

Unincorporated community in Hawaii, United States

ʻUalapuʻe
- Census-designated place
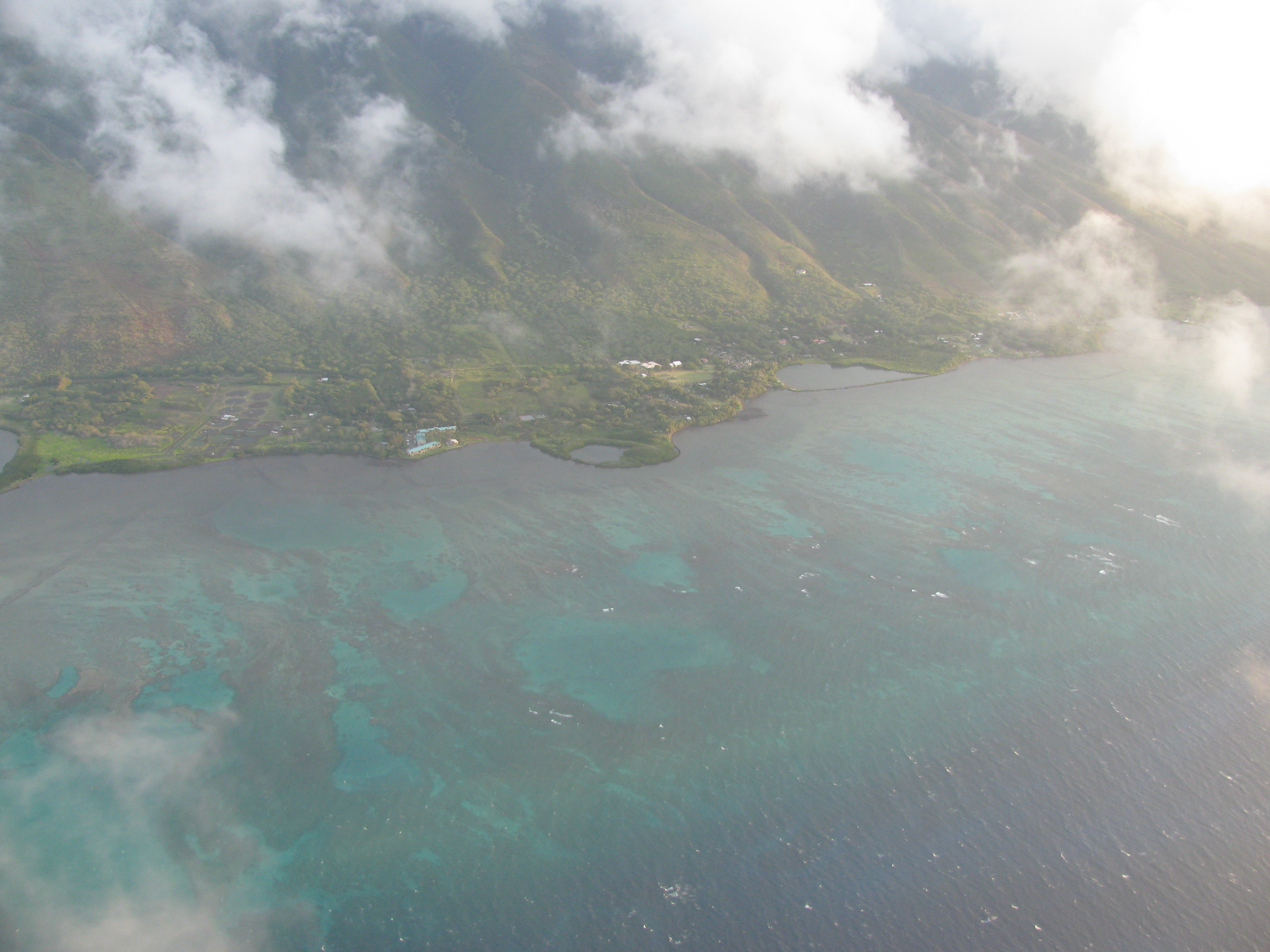
- Aerial view

- Location within Hawaii
- Coordinates: 21°03′42″N 156°49′53″W
- Country: United States
- State: Hawaii
- County: Maui

Area
  - Total: 3.64 sq mi (9.42 km^{2})
  - Land: 3.17 sq mi (8.20 km^{2})
  - Water: 0.47 sq mi (1.22 km^{2})
- Elevation: 30 ft (9.1 m)

Population (2020)
  - Total: 393
  - Density: 124.2/sq mi (47.94/km^{2})
- Time zone: UTC-10 (Hawaii-Aleutian)
- ZIP code: 96748
- Area code: 808
- GNIS feature ID: 364317

ʻUalapuʻe (Hawaiian pronunciation: [ʔuwələˈpuʔe], lit. 'hilled sweet potatoes') is an unincorporated community, census-designated place, and Hawaiian home land on the island of Molokaʻi in Maui County, Hawaii, United States. Its population was 393 as of the 2020 census. The community is located along Hawaii Route 450 on the southeast coast of the island of Molokaʻi. ʻUalapuʻe does not have villages, but does have many notable fishponds.

== Geography ==
Ualapue is located at 21.0617343°N 156.8313360°W. According to the U.S. Census Bureau, the community has an area of 3.637 square miles (9.42 km^{2}), of which 3.165 square miles (8.20 km^{2}) is land and 0.472 square miles (1.22 km^{2}) is water.

== Demographics ==
Historical population
Census	Pop.	Note	%±
2020	393		—
U.S. Decennial Census
