= Kōkeʻe State Park =

Park located in northwestern Kauaʻi in the Hawaiian Islands, US

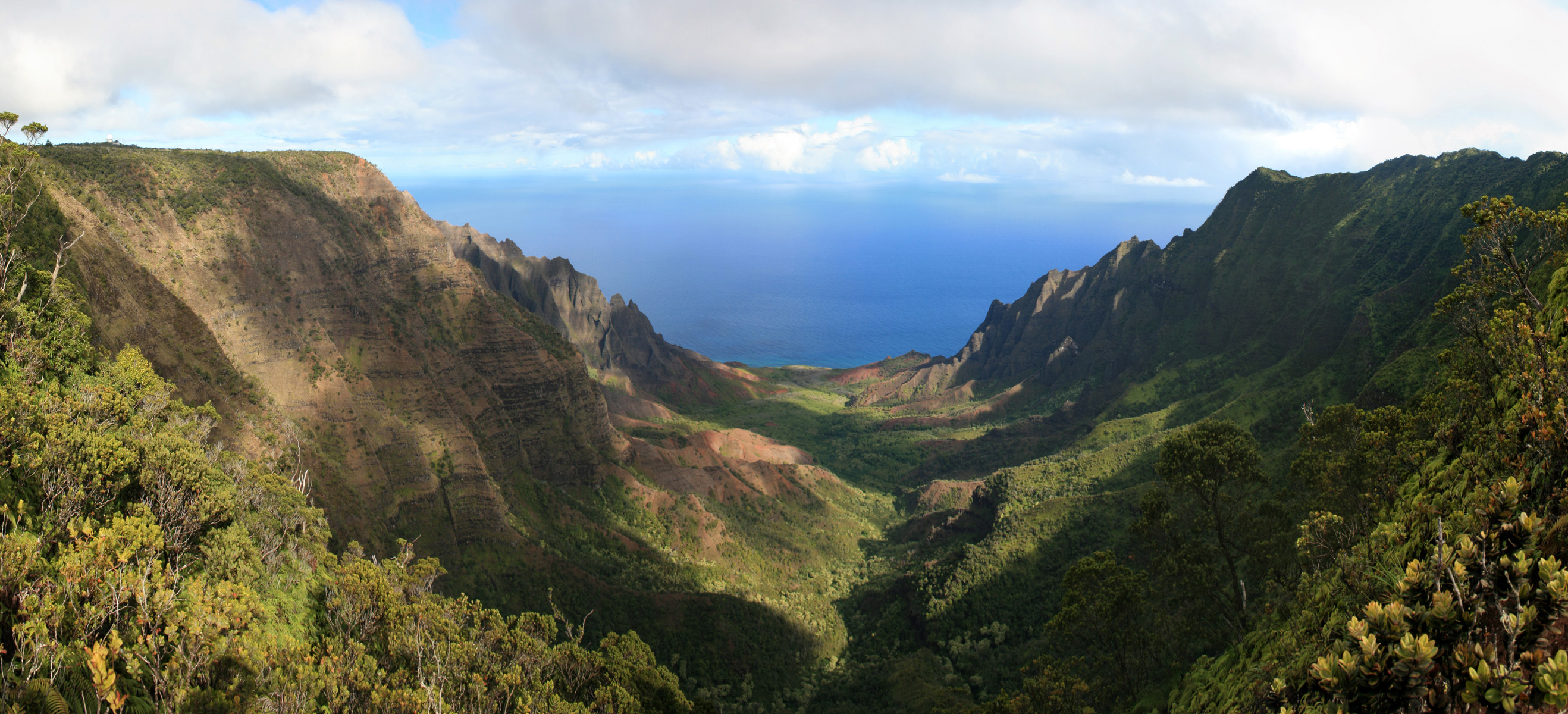
- Kalalau Valley viewed from the Pihea Trail

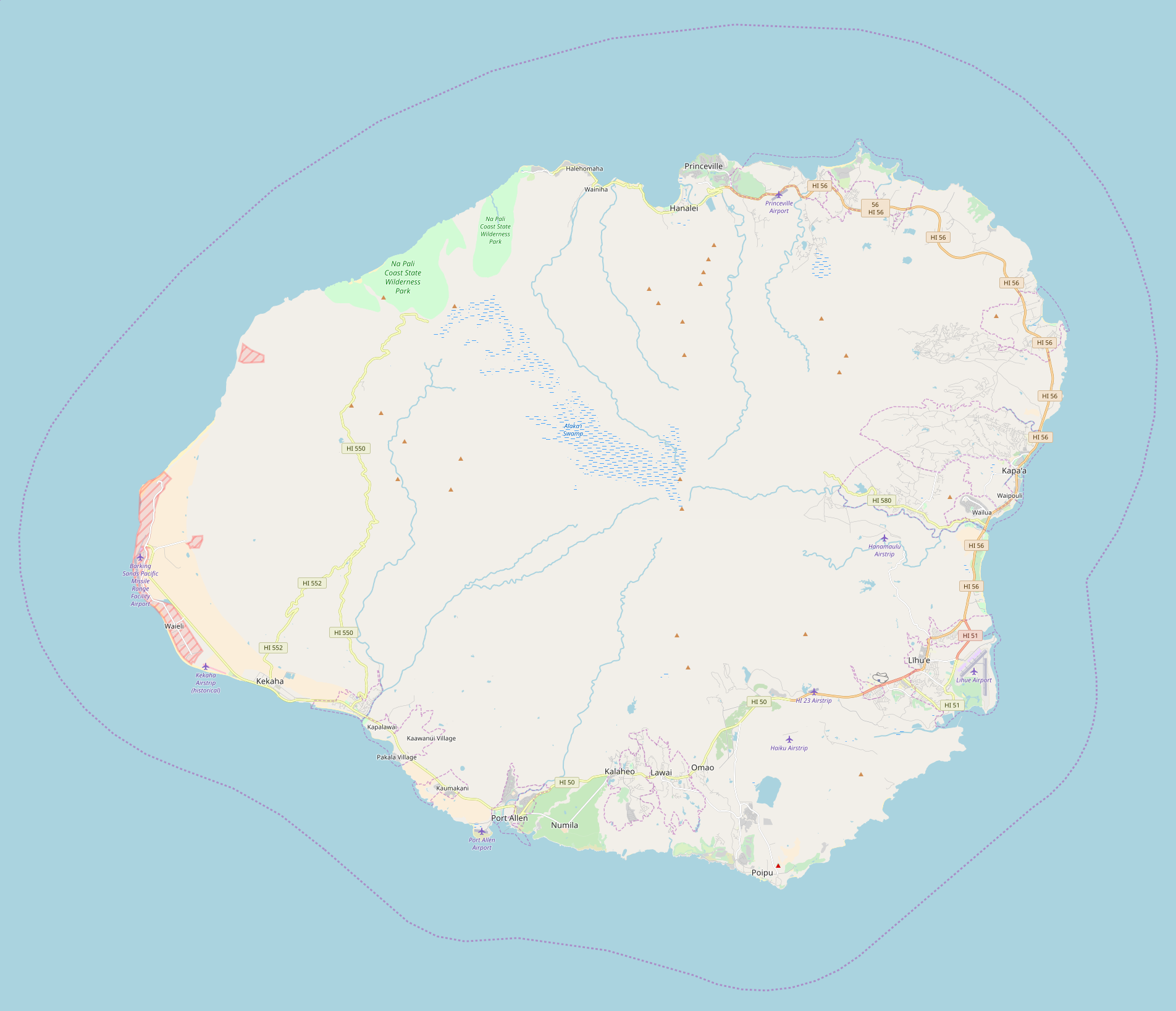
- Location within Kauai Location within Hawaii
- Location: Kauaʻi, United States
- Nearest city: Waimea
- Coordinates: 22°7′49″N 159°39′32″W
- Governing body: Hawaii Department of Land and Natural Resources

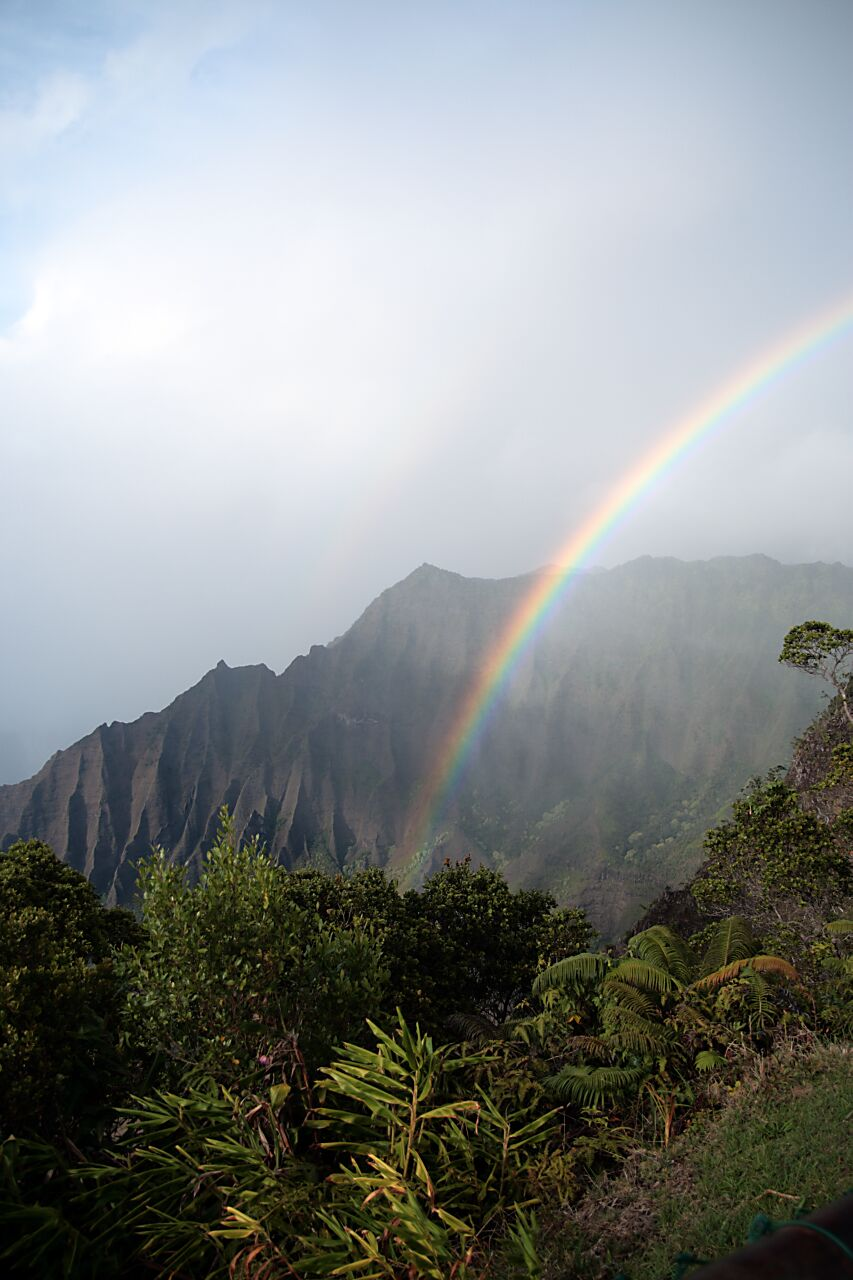
Overlooking the Kalalau Valley from Koke'e State Park

Kōkeʻe State Park is a state park in northwestern Kauaʻi, Hawaii, United States. The park is located north of Waimea Canyon State Park on the island's west side and is administered by the Hawaii Department of Land and Natural Resources. It includes the Kōkeʻe Museum at the 15 mi (24 km) marker on State Road 550, cabins for rent and hiking trails. The park includes 4,345 acres (17.58 km^{2}) of mountainous terrain on a plateau ranging from about 3,200 to 4,200 ft (980 to 1,280 m) above sea level.

The main attractions of Kōkeʻe State Park trails are the native vegetation, native forest birds, and the scenic cliffside views. Situated on a plateau between 3,200 and 4,200 ft (980 and 1,280 m), much of Kōkeʻe is a montane (infrequent frost) mesic forest (50 to 100 in or 1,300 to 2,500 mm annual rainfall with moist soil conditions) dominated by koa (Acacia koa) and ʻōhiʻa lehua (Metrosideros polymorpha) trees. The park receives around 70 inches (1,800 mm) of rain per year, mostly from October to May.

At the end of the state road is a lookout onto the Kalalau Valley, once home to thousands of native Hawaiians. The valley was the backdrop for Jack London's short story Koʻolau the Leper.

In October it is the home of a festival honoring Queen Emma of Hawaii.

== Geography and setting ==
Kōkeʻe State Park is situated upland of Waimea Canyon along the Waimea Canyon and Kōkeʻe road corridor. The park includes viewpoints toward Kalalau Valley and the Nā Pali Coast. The park has views of Kalalau Valley from about 4,000 ft (1,200 m) elevation.

The park's elevation gives it a cooler and wetter climate than many coastal areas of Kauaʻi. Annual rainfall is about 70 in (1,800 mm), and average temperatures range from about 45 °F (7 °C) in January to 68 °F (20 °C) in July.

== Historic CCC camp ==
The park contains the Civilian Conservation Corps Camp in Koke'e State Park, a historic Civilian Conservation Corps camp built in 1935. The camp is a complex of 11 wood-frame buildings surrounding an open grassed quadrangle.

The camp was used for forest management, trail and road work and other conservation projects in the Kōkeʻe area. After the CCC program ended, the camp was used during World War II, later by Job Corps and Youth Conservation Corps programs, and then rehabilitated with the involvement of Kōkeʻe Natural History Museum and volunteers beginning in 1990. According to the Historic Hawaiʻi Foundation, it is the only one of Hawaii's five original CCC camps that remains in a natural area.

== Hiking trails ==
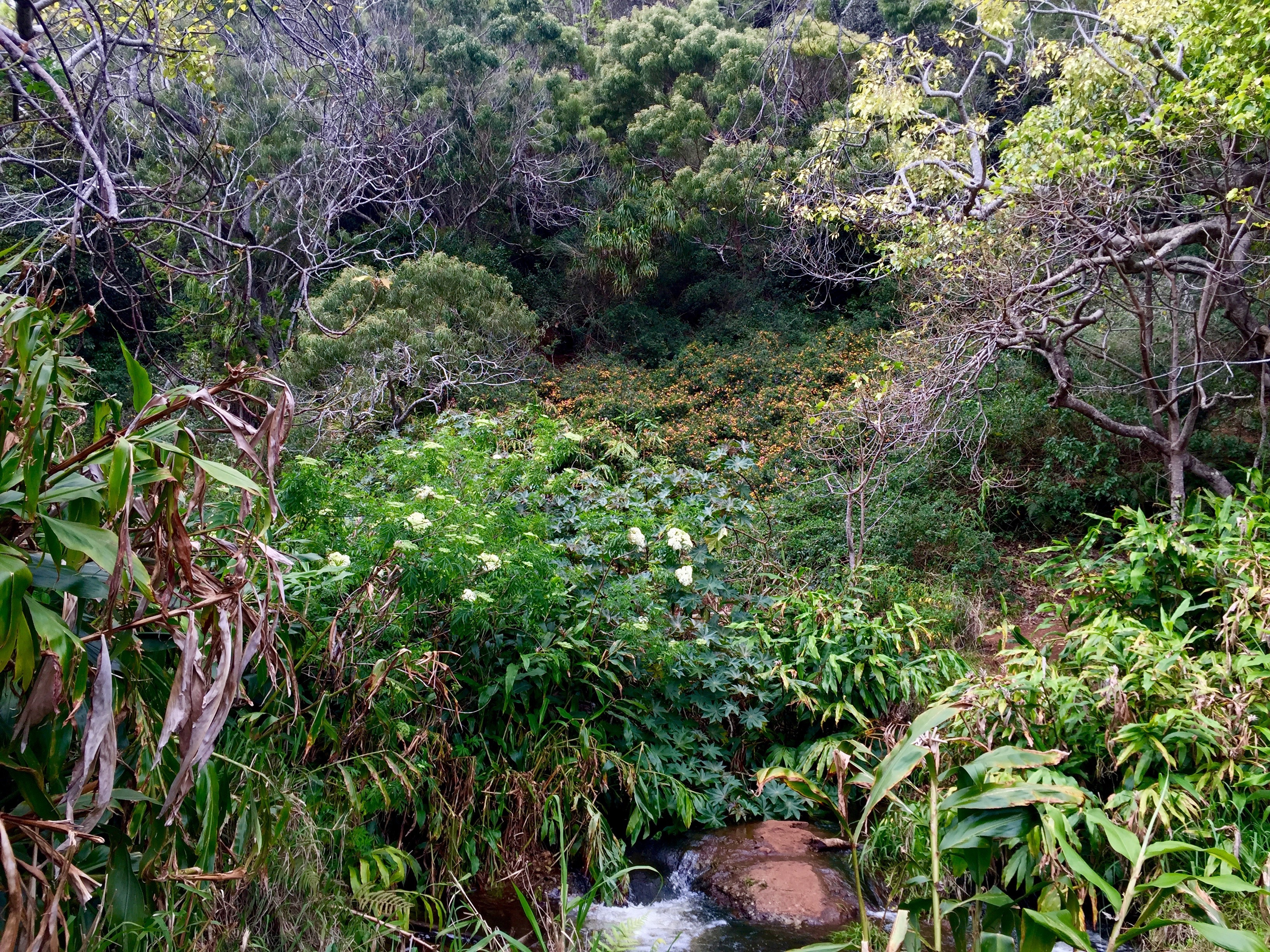
Vegetation near Waipoʻo Falls along the Canyon Trail.

- Alakaʻi Swamp Trail, length: 3.5 mi (5.6 km). Trail through native wet forest to the rim of Wainiha Pali with sweeping view of the north shore. This birdwatching trail is often wet, slippery and muddy. The majority of this trail is a plank boardwalk covered with chicken wire to provide traction.
- Awaʻawapuhi Trail, length: 3.25 mi (5.23 km). A trail with mesic and dryland native plants, it has views into the steep-sided Nuʻalolo and Awaʻawapuhi Valleys. Return climb of 1,620 ft (490 m).
- Berry Flat Trail, length: 0.6 mi (0.97 km). This trail traverses a mix of planted alien and native forest types, including Coast Redwood (Sequoia sempervirens) and Sugi (Cryptomeria japonica) groves and disturbed koa/ʻōhiʻa forest.
- Black Pipe Trail, length: 0.5 mi (0.80 km). This trail is an alternate access to the Canyon Trail. Native hibiscus and iliau (Wilkesia gymnoxiphium) can be seen along the trail.
- Canyon Trail, length: 1.8 mi (2.9 km). A trail with views of Waimea and Poʻomau Canyons. The trail follows the rim of Waimea Canyon and crosses Kōkeʻe Stream.
- Cliff Trail, length: 0.1 mi (0.16 km). A spur trail leading to a viewpoint of Waimea Canyon. Feral goats are often seen on the canyon walls.
- Ditch Trail, length: 1.7 mi (2.7 km). A trail developed to construct and maintain the Kōkeʻe Ditch. Vistas of surrounding forest and Poʻomau Stream.
- Faye Trail, length: 0.1 mi (0.16 km). A short trail that accesses other trails in the Halemanu area.
- Halemanu-Kōkeʻe Trail, length: 1.2 mi (1.9 km). This trail wanders through somewhat disturbed koa/ʻōhiʻa forest. Recovery from Hurricane Iwa and transition to koa forest from drier conditions is evident.
- Iliau Nature Loop, length: 0.25 mi (0.40 km). Easy roadside nature trail through dry shrubland with plants identified. Sweeping views of Waimea Canyon and Waiʻalae Canyon.
- Kaluapuhi Trail, length: 1.6 mi (2.6 km). Disturbed ʻōhiʻa montane mesic forest with some intact forest areas.
- Kukui Trail, Length: 2.5 mi (4.0 km). Scenic, but steep trail into Waimea Canyon. Elevation drop of 2,000 ft (610 m).
- Kumuwela Trail, length: 1 mi (1.6 km). Mosaic of ʻōhiʻa and koa/ʻōhiʻa montane mesic forests with alien weed problems and hurricane damage.
- Nature Trail, length: 0.1 mi (0.16 km). A starter trail to learn about native forest vegetation.
- Nuʻalolo Trail, length: 3.75 mi (6.04 km). Trail through koa/ʻōhiʻa montane mesic forests and an ʻaʻaliʻi (Dodonaea viscosa) lowland dry shrubland with a view of Nuʻalolo Valley. Return climb of 1,570 ft (480 m).
- Pihea Trail, length: 3.7 mi (6.0 km). A nature/birdwatching trail along the rim of Kalalau Valley, traversing ʻōhiʻa montane wet forest.
- Puʻu ka ʻOhelo Trail, length: 0.5 miles (0.80 km). Along this trail are examples of the impact that invasive alien weeds can have on native forest vegetation.
- Waininiua Trail, length: 0.6 mi (0.97 km). A trail from which to see a relatively intact koa/ʻōhiʻa montane mesic forest.
- Water Tank Trail, length: 1 mi (1.6 km). This trail provides an example of a native koa/ʻōhiʻa forest.

== See also ==
- Civilian Conservation Corps Camp in Koke'e State Park
- Waimea Canyon State Park
- Nā Pali Coast State Park
- List of Hawaii state parks
