= Cook Landing Site (Waimea) =

Historic site on Kauaʻi, Hawaii

- U.S. National Register of Historic Places
- U.S. National Historic Landmark
- Hawaiʻi Register of Historic Places
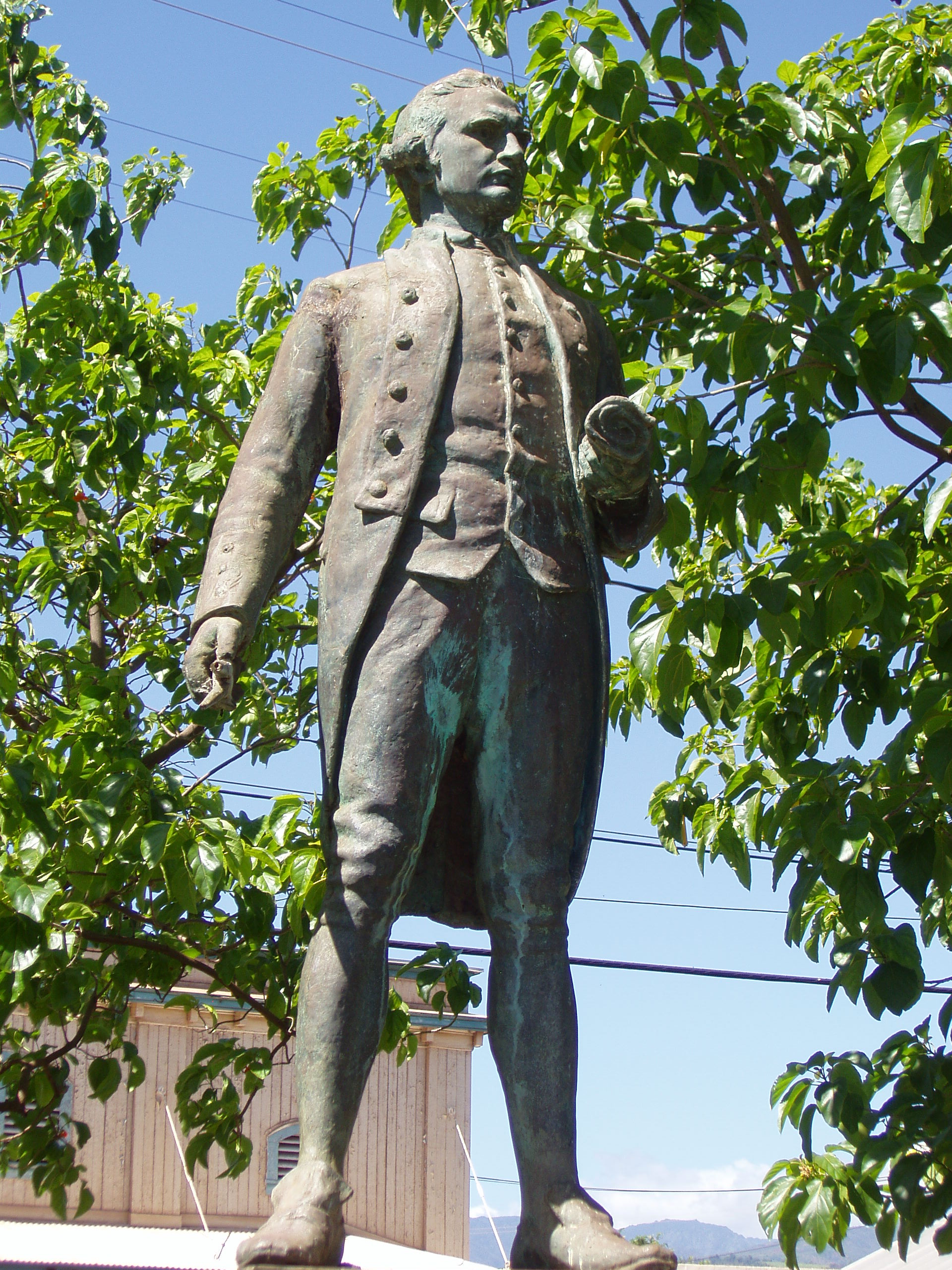
- A monument near the site

- Location within Hawaii
- Location: Southwest of Route 50, Waimea, Hawaii
- Coordinates: 21°57′8.1468″N 159°39′59.91804″W
- Area: less than one acre
- Built: 1778
- NRHP reference No.: 66000298
- HRHP No.: 50-30-05-09303

Significant dates
- Added to NRHP: October 15, 1966
- Designated NHL: December 29, 1962
- Designated HRHP: September 30, 1988

The Cook Landing Site in Waimea on Kauaʻi island in Hawaii, is where Captain James Cook landed at the mouth of the Waimea River on January 20, 1778. Cook was the first European reported to have sighted the Hawaiian Islands, and the January 20 landfall on southwestern Kauaʻi was his first arrival upon Hawaiian soil. Cook Landing Site was registered as a National Historic Landmark on December 29, 1962. The landing is principally commemorated at Hofgaard Park, a small county park located near the supposed landing site.

== Location and setting ==
The Cook Landing Site is located on the shore of Waimea Bay in southwestern Kauaʻi, just west of the mouth of the Waimea River. The exact spot where Cook came ashore is unknown, and it is suspected that the land has actually grown since 1778 due to deposition of sediment. The landing site is believed to be close to Lucy Wright Park, across the river from the later Russian Fort Elizabeth, which is preserved in a state park. Hofgaard Park, located one block inland from the shore and one block from the river, contains a statue of Cook, and commemorative plaques marking the event.

== History ==
The British Royal Navy Captain James Cook (1728–1779) is well known today for his many voyages of discovery and exploration. His third voyage into the Pacific Ocean took him first to the South Pacific, where he charted a number of islands before heading north toward the west coast North America. On January 18, 1778, the expedition sighted Oahu and Kauaʻi, and headed toward the latter island, carried by prevailing winds. The next day, the ships coasted along Kauaʻi's eastern coast, where they were met by Native Hawaiians who came out in canoes to trade with them. Waimea Bay was identified as a "tolerable" anchorage by a scouting team sent out by Cook, and he anchored there on the afternoon of January 20. Natives congregated "in considerable numbers" on the sandy beach, and Cook came ashore with an armed escort that day and established friendly relations. The next day, he explored up the river valley, taking extensive notes of the people and culture that have since become of considerable ethnographic importance.

Cook's expedition spent two weeks in the islands, with Cook himself also exploring Niʻihau. The expedition then went on to map the Pacific coast of North America, all the way to the Bering Strait. It then returned to what Cook had dubbed the Sandwich Islands, with Cook being killed by Natives on the Big Island in a conflict over a stolen boat.

== See also ==
- List of National Historic Landmarks in Hawaii
- National Register of Historic Places listings in Kauaʻi County, Hawaii
