= Waimea Ditch =

Canal in Kauai County, Hawaii

Coordinates: 21°59′55″N 159°40′18″W

The Waimea Ditch is an irrigation canal on the island of Kauai, Hawaii.

In 1903, the Waimea Ditch was dug to divert water from the Waimea River to nearby sugar cane fields. Construction of Waimea Ditch was completed in 1907.

During 1911–1912, George Ewart, the manager of the Waimea Sugar Company, reconfigured the Waimea Ditch by replacing the iron flumes with tunnels to increase its flow capacity.

== See also ==
- H.P. Faye
- Kikiaola
- Kokee Ditch
