= H. P. Faye =

Hawaiian sugar plantation owner

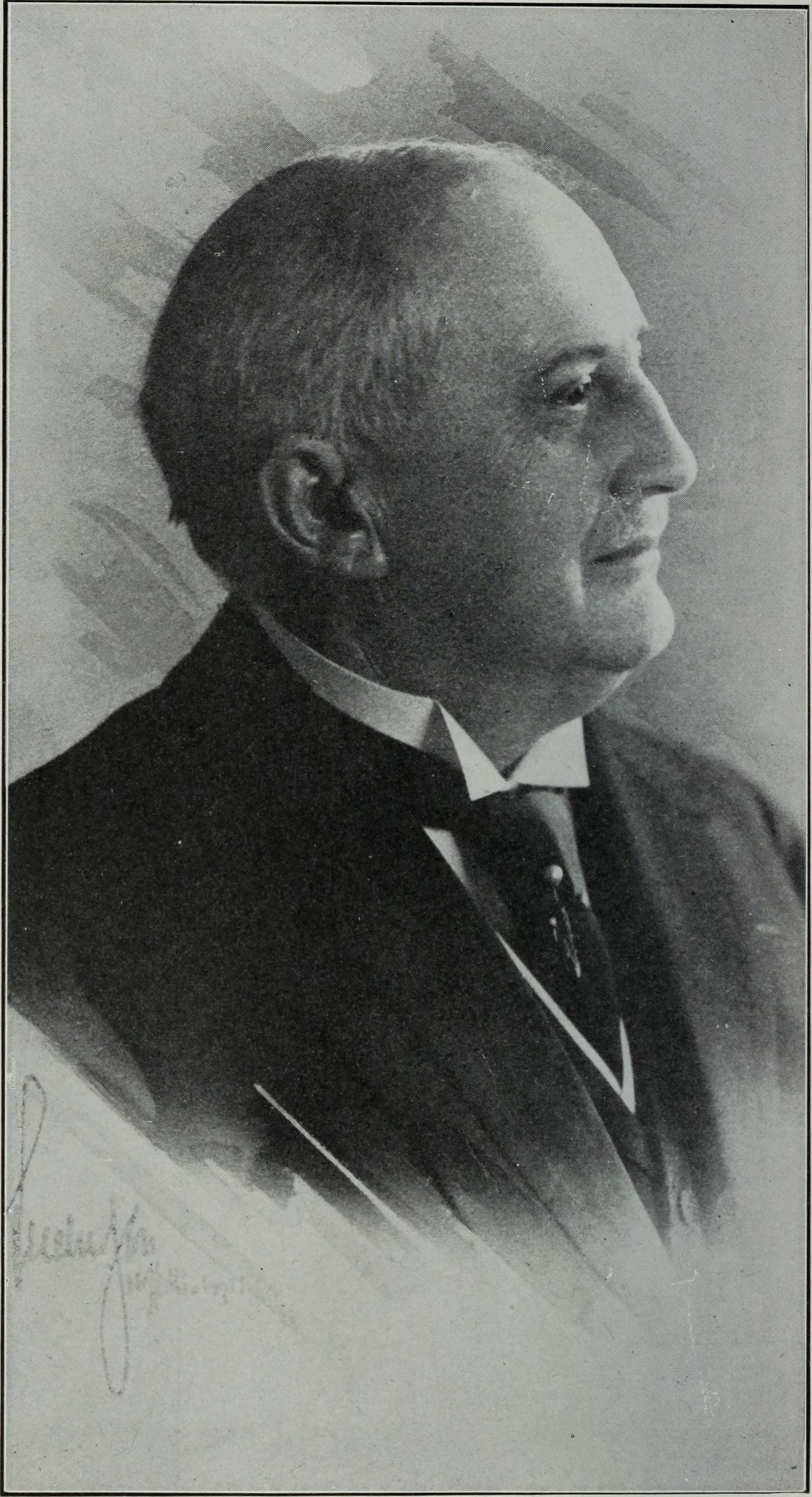
H. P. Faye

Hans Peter (H.P.) Faye (October 20, 1859 – August 28, 1928) was a Norwegian-born businessman who developed sugarcane plantations on west Kauai.

== Background ==
Hans Peter Faye was born in 1859 in Drammen in Buskerud, Norway, when the country was in a personal union with Sweden. He started his business career in 1875 as clerk and bookkeeper at a Norwegian paper and pulp factory. Faye arrived on Kauai in the Kingdom of Hawaii in 1880. He leased land at Mana, Kauai from his uncle, Valdemar Knudsen, and settled there. After clearing the rocky plain at Mana of giant lava rocks, Faye obtained seed cane and planted his first sugar cane crop.

== Career ==
In 1884, he founded the H.P. Fayé & Co. plantation and began well boring for water. In 1886, when Faye's first crop was ready for harvesting, he rented Chinese laborers to harvest the cane from Chinese immigrant Leong Pah On (1848–1924), known as Kauai's "Rice King". The cut cane was sent by bullock teams into Kekaha, several miles away, where it was processed at the sugar mill at Kekaha Plantation.

At the turn of the 20th century, the now-defunct Waimea Sugar Mill Company was a publicly owned and traded company, and Faye began to purchase shares in it. By 1905, he was the President and largest stockholder of Waimea Sugar Mill Co. By 1915 or 1916, Faye owned the entire operation. In addition to operating his own businesses, in 1898 he helped merge three existing plantations into the Kekaha Sugar Company, and he became its first manager and Vice president, a position he held for thirty years, until his death in 1928.

Faye drew up much of the designs for the Kekaha Plantation. It was initially seen as a shaky investment—with a need for great amounts of capital to build an infrastructure of canals, pumps, water systems, and other facilities needed to overcome its inherent physical disadvantages. These pioneering years were rough ones for the sugarcane growers who lacked an abundant water supply. As the sugarcane area increased, natural springs and intermittent streams proved inadequate, so wells were drilled. Most wells had been drilled too deep and at locations far too seaward. As a result, most wells became salty over time and were abandoned, buried and lost.

As part of Kekaha Sugar's expansion program, three surface water diversions were constructed to address the failure of the well supply. In 1903, the Waimea Ditch was dug to divert water from the Waimea River to nearby fields. The success of this venture prompted the construction of the Kekaha Ditch in 1905, which carries water from an altitude of about 500 feet on the Waimea River to Kekaha. The ditch was completed in 1907 and the well water quality began to improve.

In 1926, the Kokee Ditch was completed diverting water from Mohihi Stream and the headwater of the Waimea River in the Alaka'i Swamp at an altitude of about 3400 feet. About one-fourth of the Kokee Ditch supply has irrigated the highland cane fields below Pu'u Opae reservoir on Niu Ridge. The balance irrigated the highland fields east of Koke'e Road. With the draining of the Nohili and Kawaiele Marshes in 1922 and the continued expansion of sugarcane area, another period of well development took place in the 1920s and 1930s. Initially, this consisted of batteries of closely spaced drilled wells, but Maui-type shafts (tunnels that skim fresh water off the top of the basal aquifer) located along the foot of the bluffs subsequently replaced these. It was Faye's vision that created the Kekaha Ditch and Kokee Ditch systems and the intricate drainage canals that drained the large swamps of Mana.

In 1950, Waimea Sugar Mill Company was reorganized into the Kikiaola Land Company, a property and land management division, and Waimea Sugar Mill, Inc. which continued to raise and process cane sugar. By 1969, with returns on sugar diminishing, the Faye family kept title to the lands and sold the sugar operations to Kekaha Sugar Company.

== Personal life ==
On December 21, 1893, Faye married Margaret Bonnar Lindsay (1874–1961) who was originally from Fife, Scotland. They would have eight children, three girls and five boys. The youngest was born in Norway, where the Fayes had returned to live. In 1914, seven of the children were of school age, with the eldest ready to enter college. The Fayes purchased a residence in Berkeley, California, where the children would attend the University of California, Berkeley. Hans Faye died in Berkeley, California, in 1928.

== Faye Museum ==
The Faye Museum is named in honor of Hans Peter Faye. The museum can be found at Waimea Plantation Cottages. The single-room museum contains exhibits and photographs tracking the journey of Faye and the sugar industry in West Kauai.

== Other sources ==
- Greipsland, Torbjørn (2004) Aloha fra glemte nordmenn på Hawaii (Emigrantforlaget) ISBN 978-8299692809
- Moe, Jon (1975) Akamai Sagaen om den norske utvandringen til Hawaii (Oslo) ISBN 978-8205083790
- Satrum, Jon (2010) Norwegians In Hawaii Conflict In Plantation Society (Norwegian-American Historical Association)
- Semmingsen, Ingrid (1950) Veien mot vest, annen del. Utvandringen fra Norge 1865–1915 (Oslo: Aschehoug)
