= Waimea, Hawaii =

Waimea refers to multiple places in Hawai‘i:

- Waimea, Hawaii County, Hawaii
- Waimea, Kauai County, Hawaii
- Waimea Bay on O‘ahu
- Waimea Canyon State Park on Kaua‘i
