= Civilian Conservation Corps Camp in Kōkeʻe State Park =

- U.S. National Register of Historic Places
- Hawaiʻi Register of Historic Places
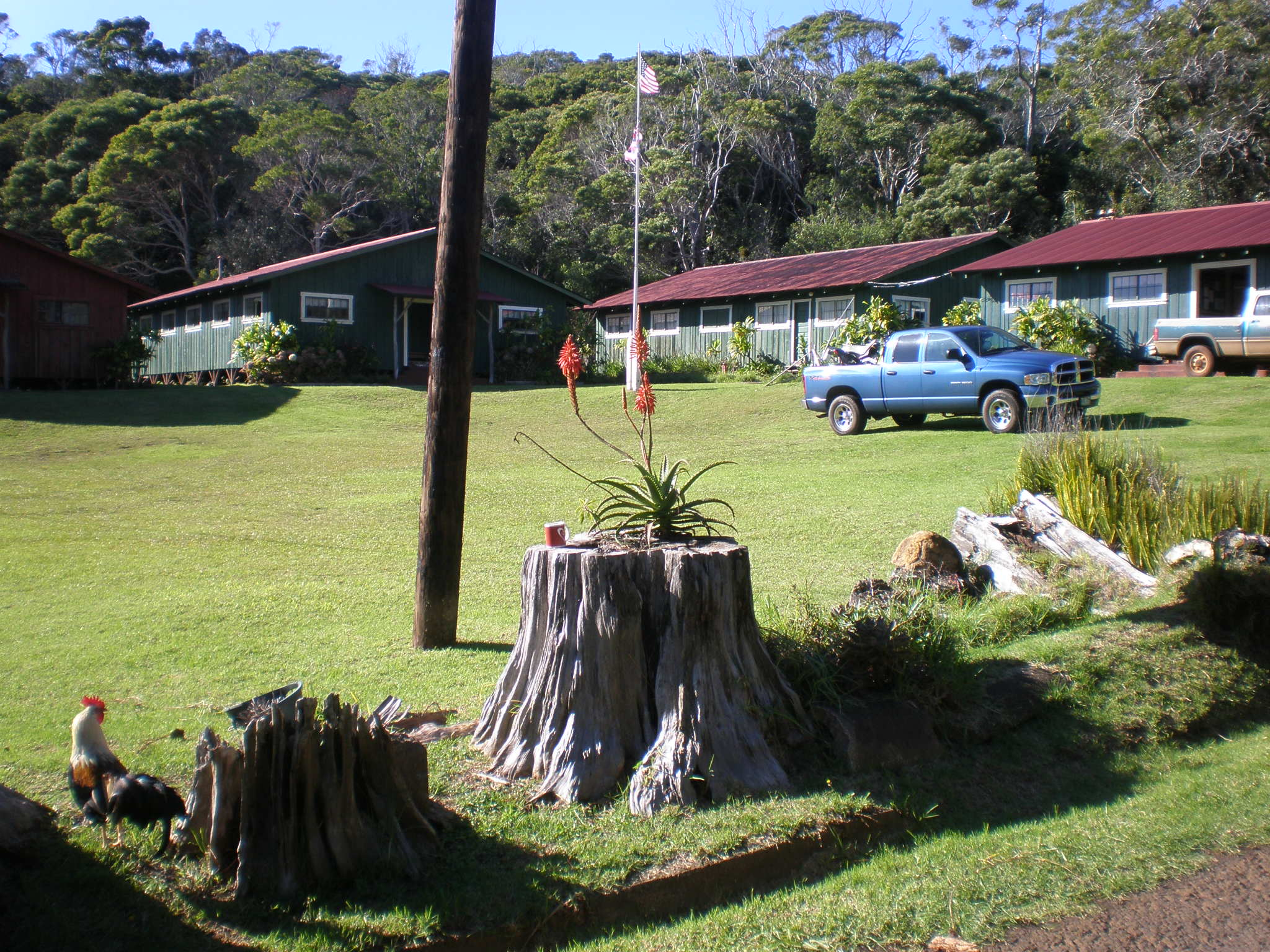

- Location within Hawaii
- Location: Hawaii Route 550, Waimea, Kauaʻi, Hawaii
- Coordinates: 22°7′59″N 159°39′44″W
- Built: 1935
- NRHP reference No.: 96001504
- HRHP No.: 50-30-06-09392

Significant dates
- Added to NRHP: December 20, 1996
- Designated HRHP: December 20, 1996

Civilian Conservation Corps Camp in Kōkeʻe State Park is located at Hawaii Route 550, in Waimea, on the island of Kauaʻi, in the U.S. state of Hawaii. It was built in 1935 with lumber that was put into the saltwater and floated to the shore at Port Allen, the seawater adding a natural termite protection to the lumber. The camp was in continual use for forest management, until Hurricane Iwa devastated it in 1982. In the 1990s it was restored through the efforts of the non-profit Hui O Laka environmental group, and is currently open to the public. It was added to the Hawaiʻi Register of Historic Places and the National Register of Historic Places on December 20, 1996.

== History ==
The camp was originally built in 1935 as one of five Hawaii camps constructed by the Civilian Conservation Corps of Franklin Roosevelt's New Deal stimulus. The other four camps have been absorbed by population growth, and Kōkeʻe is the lone camp remaining in a natural environment. The CCC at Kōkeʻe provided forest management, by building trails, roads, and fences, as well as planting over a million trees on Kauaʻi. They helped fight forest fires, eradicate unwanted feral mammals, and collected tree seeds. In addition, the CCC from Kōkeʻe also built the CCC camp at Waialae Cabin. In 1943, the program had been disbanded, and the camp was used by the 443d Airlift Wing during World War II. From 1966 until 1973, the Job Corps occupied the premises and provided forest management, followed by the Youth Conservation Corps. The camp was abandoned in 1982 after Hurricane Iwa.

The camp is operated by the non-profit local environmental group Hui O Laka, which is dedicated to educating, enhancing, and maintaining Kōkeʻe. In 1990, the Hawaii State Legislature provided Hui O Laka a $20,000 Grant-in-Aid for renovations to the camp. The restoration and continual maintenance of the camp has been provided by members of Hui O Laka, and by volunteers.

There are seventeen contributing, and three non-contributing buildings, sites, and structures on the site. During construction, the lumber could not be lifted directly onto the shore, because of the shallowness of Port Allen and the lack of equipment to accomplish the task. Instead, the lumber was floated ashore in the salt water. The soaking in seawater gave the lumber lasting termite protection, allowing the wood to be virtually intact when the camp was added to the NRHP in 1996. The non-contributing buildings were built after 1950.

=== Contributing buildings ===
- Executive building 470 square feet (44 m^{2}) (in use for overnight accommodations)
- Camp administration building 812 square feet (75 m^{2}) (in use as the Natural History Museum)
- Mess hall 2,750 square feet (260 m^{2})
- "A" Barracks 2,024 square feet (190 m^{2})
- "B" Barracks 2,024 square feet (190 m^{2})
- "C" Barracks
- Recreation lodge 1,950 square feet (180 m^{2}) destroyed in 1982 by Hurricane Iwa
- Foremen cabin 597 square feet (55 m^{2})
- Building 9, storage 494 square feet (46 m^{2})
- Supply room 308 square feet (29 m^{2})
- Cooler room 106 square feet (9.8 m^{2})
- Gas house, formerly used as a garage
- Building 14, small wooden building
- Building 15, cook's house demolished in 1993
- Building 16, formerly a garage and workshop
- Ranger's cabin 1,218 square feet (110 m^{2}) built in 1930
- Building "I" 120 square feet (11 m^{2}) old laundry room

== Facilities, fees ==
Reservations are required for overnight accommodations at the camp. Stays are limited primarily to Hui O Laka volunteers and researchers with an advance payment of rental fee. The facilities are sometimes available for large group functions, subject to advance approval.

== See also ==
- Kōkeʻe State Park
