= Lucy Wright Park =

Municipal park in Waimea, Hawaii

- Location within Hawaii
- Location: Southwest of Route 50, Waimea, Hawaii
- Coordinates: 21°57′11″N 159°39′56″W
- Area: 4.48 acres (1.81 ha)
- Opened: 1986

Lucy Wright Park, also referred to as Lucy Wright Beach Park, is a 4.48 acre public park in the town of Waimea. The park is named after Lucy Wright, a prominent member of the Waimea community and the first native Hawaiian schoolteacher. Lucy Wright Park is on the southeast side of the mouth of the Waimea River. The Cook Landing Site is accessible from the park. The park provides a shaded pavilion, comfort station, cold showers and picnic tables. Camping is permitted at the park. The ocean water is brackish due to the river mouth situated right next to this park. The park is noted as a good area for surfing.

== History ==
The park sits on the southeast side of the mouth of the Waimea River, near the location of Captain James Cook's initial landing on the island. The park was originally named Waimea River Park. In 1938 it was renamed to Lucy Wright Park after Lucy Wright (1873–1931), a local schoolteacher who was the first Native Hawaiian teacher at an English-language school in Hawaii. It is sometimes referred to as "Lucy Wright Beach Park." The park contained a plaque commemorating the Cook Landing, however, the plaque went missing in 2006 and has not been replaced.

In 2019, Kauai authorities began cracking down on illegal camping in the park, primarily targeting homeless people with tickets for "illegal camping" and "unauthorized structure[s]." At the time, the park was home to several long-term homeless residents. The following year, during the COVID-19 pandemic, the park was one of five designated shelter places for homeless people to quarantine, with homeless people being granted long-term camping permits. The program was suspended in 2021 and authorities again began removing encampments from the park. The discontinuation of the permit program was criticized by the Honolulu Civil Beat, which said that the island had less than one hundred beds available in homeless shelters and that homeless people did not have any alternative but to stay in the park.

The park was closed from January to April 2025 for renovations to facilities, including new utilities and restrooms. A new playground was constructed in the park that summer.

== Facilities ==
The park contains a picnic area, shaded pavilion, comfort station, and canoe launch area.
