= Hofgaard Park, Waimea, Kauaʻi =

Park in Hawaii, United States

Hofgaard Park
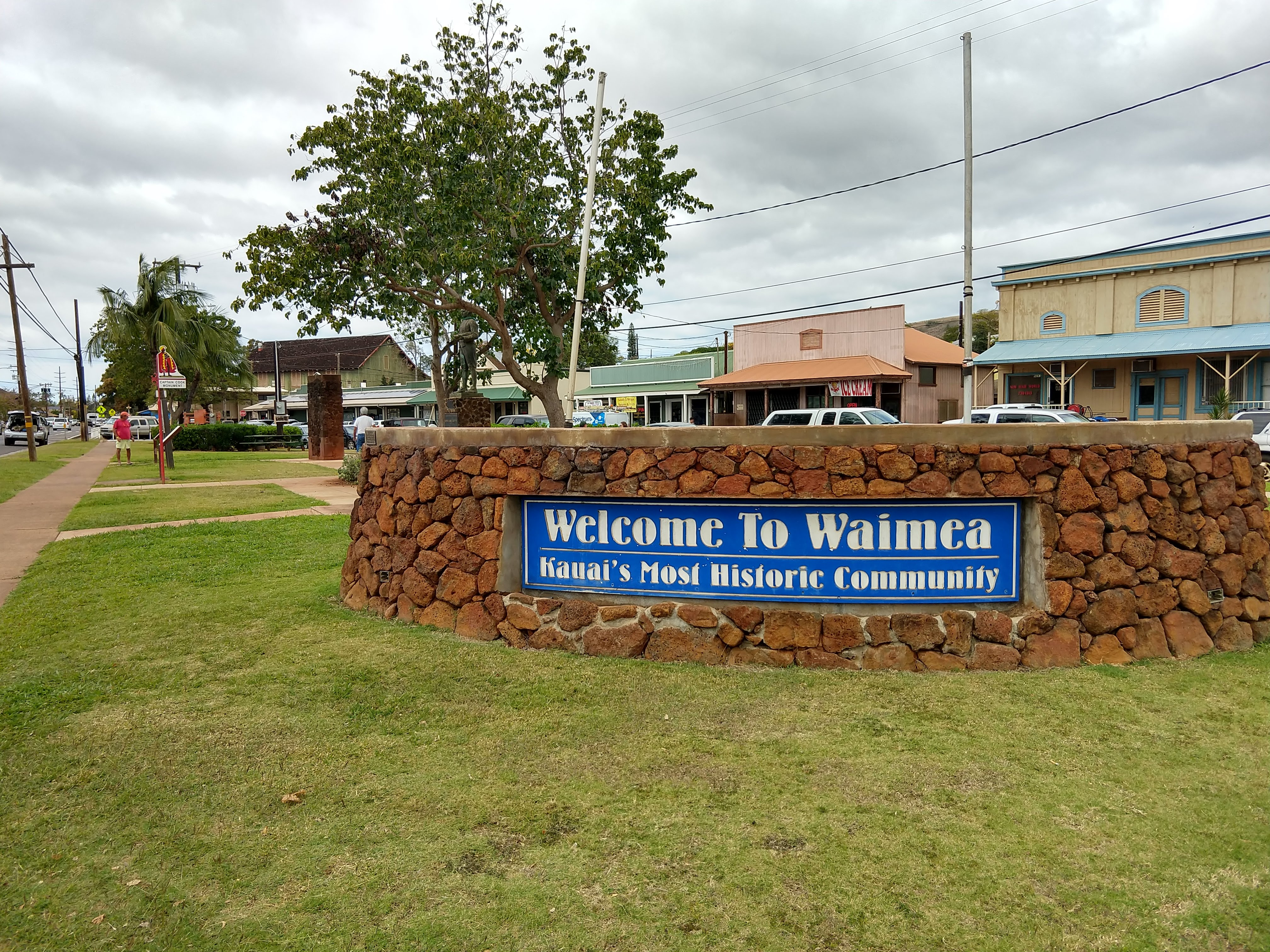
- Interactive map of Hofgaard Park
- Location: Waimea, Kauaʻi County, Hawaii
- Coordinates: 21°57′17″N 159°40′1″W
- Elevation: 3 to 9 ft (0.91 to 2.74 m)

Hofgaard Park is a narrow park between Kaumualiʻi Highway and Waimea Road in the town of Waimea. The park was named after Judge Christopher Blom Hofgaard who was a resident in Waimea. It features a statue of Captain Cook, which is a replica of an original statue in Whitby, England.

The park is dedicated to the historic events of Captain Cook's landing nearby. A timeline of Waimea and Western influence are documented on plaques in the park.

Captain James Cook was the first European reported to have sighted the Hawaiian Islands, and the January 20 landfall on southwestern Kauaʻi was his first arrival upon Hawaiian soil. On January 20, 1778, two ships under the command of British navigator Captain Cook set anchor at the mouth of the Waimea River. The crew was able to converse with the native people having been acquainted with the Tahitian language. They spent two weeks on Kauaʻi provisioning their ships for the journey north. The British explorers were amazed at the finding of Polynesian people on these remote islands.

The actual landing site was probably located in what is now Lucy Wright Park, near the mouth of the Waimea River, just south of the town of Waimea. A plaque at the park commemorates Cook's landing on the island.

== Gallery ==
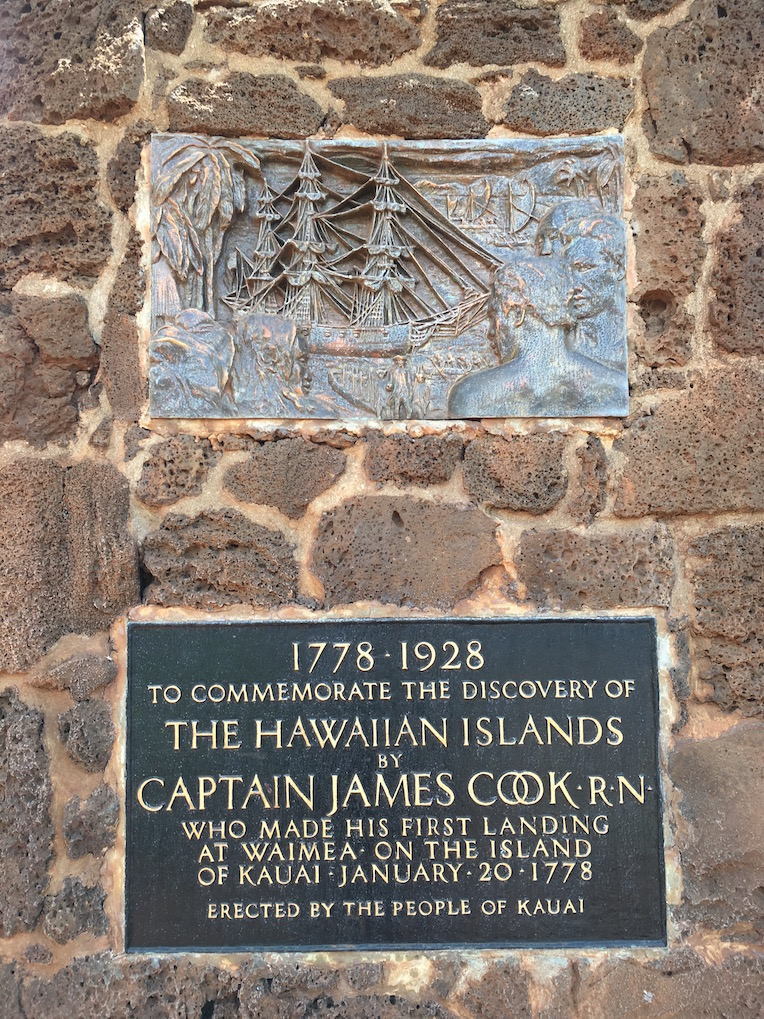
Cook Landing commemoration plaque at Hofgaard Park

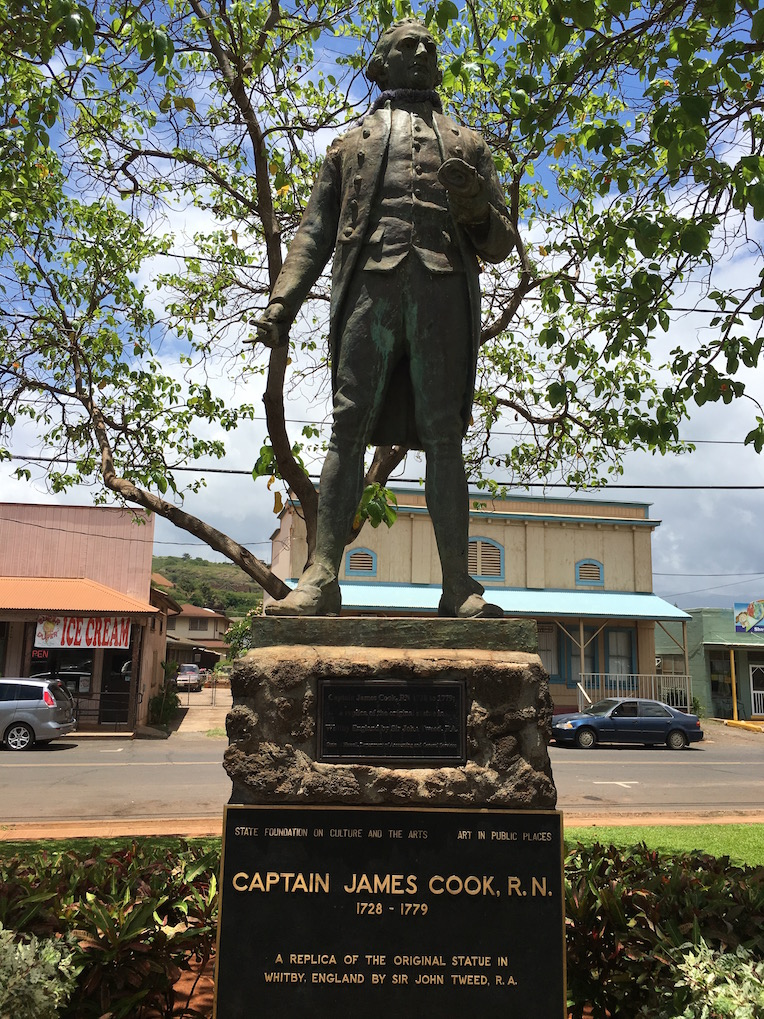
Captain Cook statue in the park

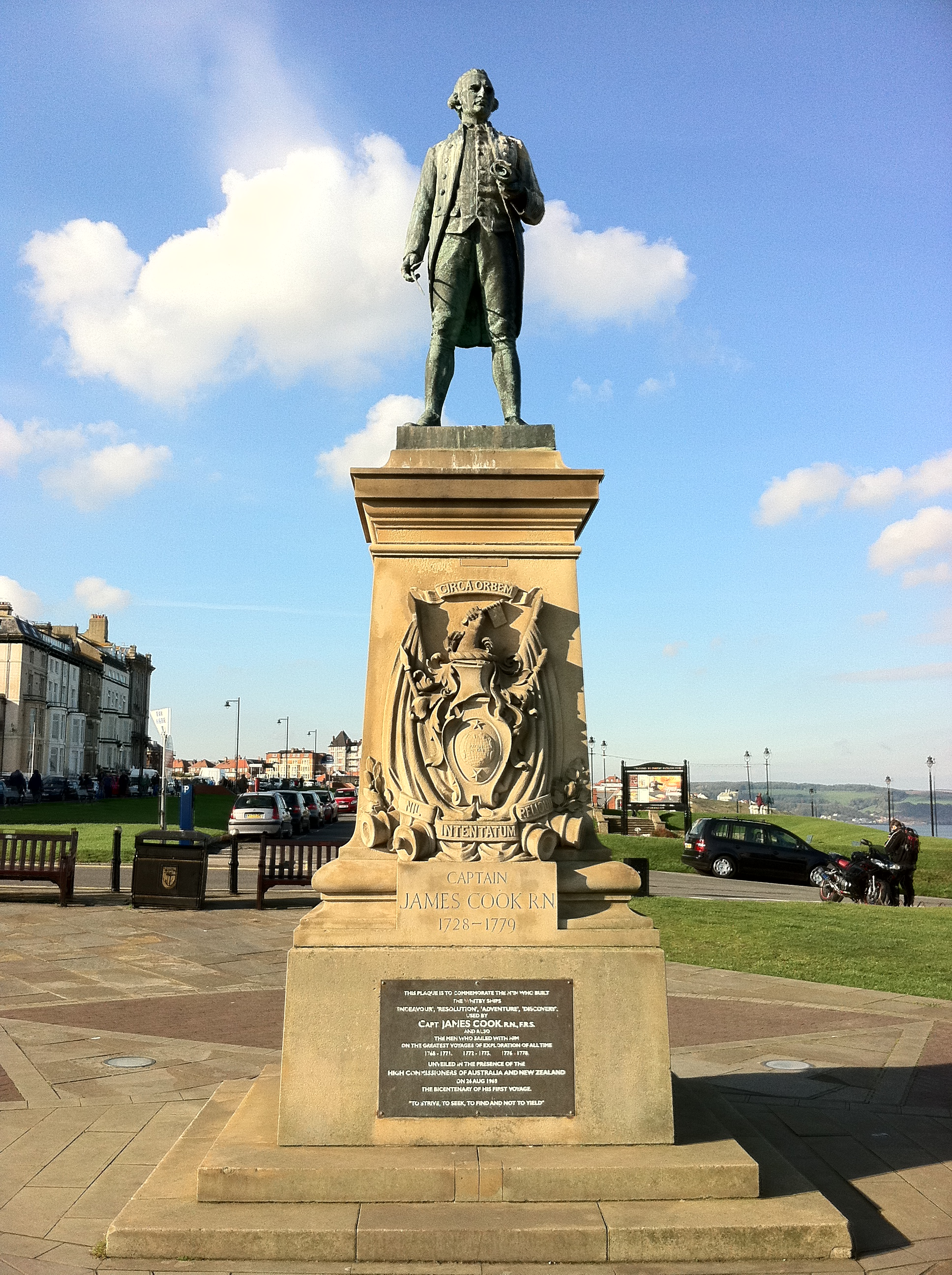
Original Statue of James Cook in Whitby, England

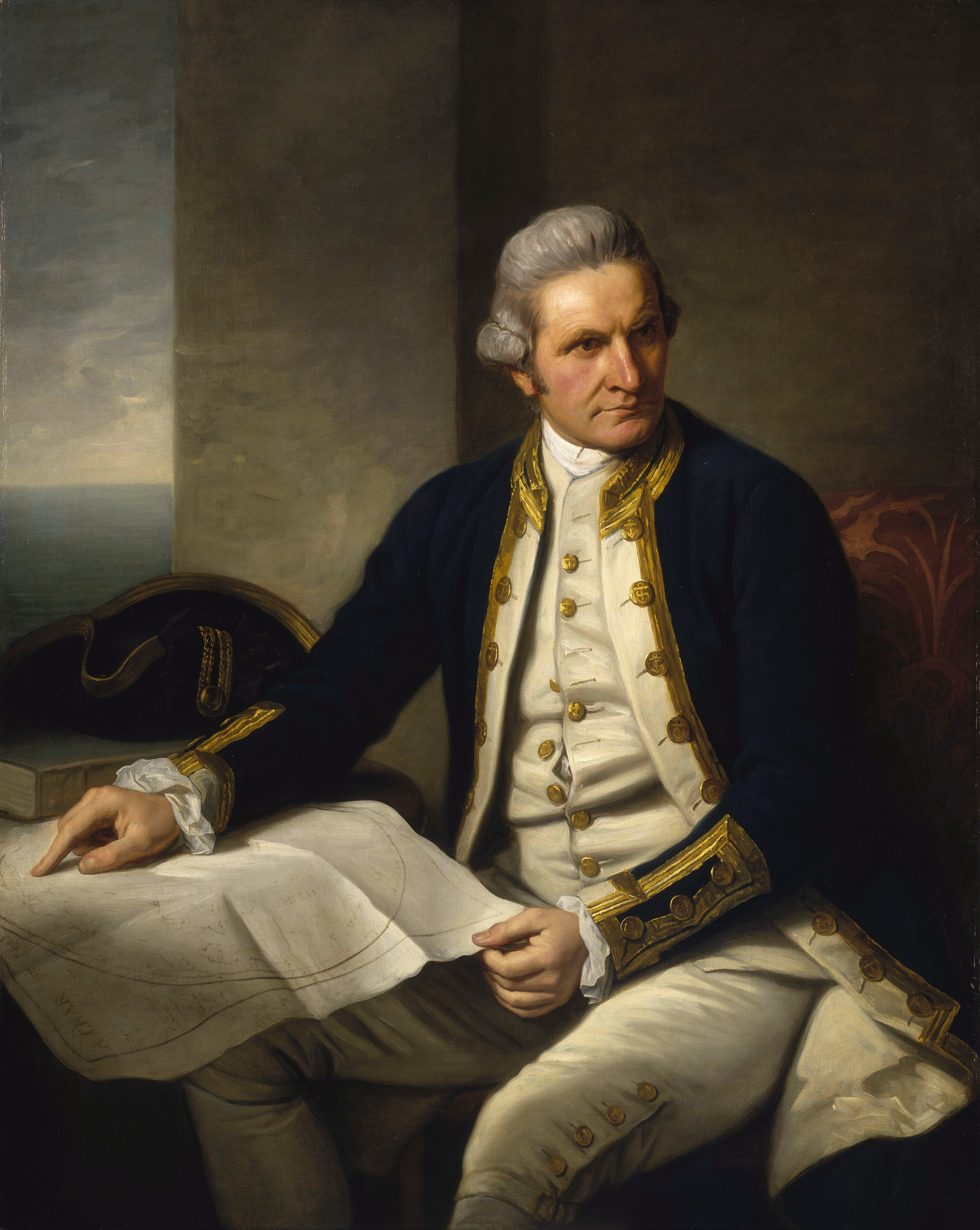
Captain James Cook Portrait

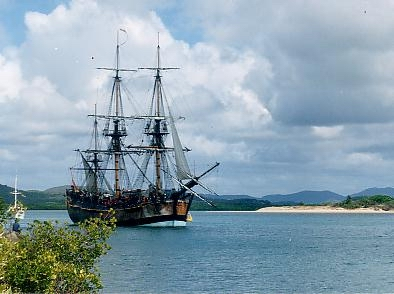
Endeavour replica in Cooktown harbour

== External References ==
- National Park Service: Cook Landing Site
