= Public Law 93-408 =

Public Law 93-408, a part of which is known as the Youth Conservation Corps Act of 1970, is an American statute that established the Youth Conservation Corps (YCC). It was established in 1974 by the 93rd United States Congress and President Gerald Ford as Public Law 93-408, an act to amend the Youth Conservation Corps Act of 1970.

"The Congress finds that the Youth Conservation Corps has demonstrated a high degree of success as a pilot program wherein American youth, representing all segments of society, have benefited by gainful employment in the healthful outdoor atmosphere of the national park system, the national forest system, other public land and water areas of the United States and by their employment have enhanced and maintained the natural resources of the United States, and whereas in so doing the youth have gained an understanding and appreciation of the Nation's environment and heritage ... it is accordingly the purpose of this act to expand and make permanent the Youth Conservation Corps and thereby further the development and maintenance of the natural resources by America's youth, and in so doing to prepare them for the ultimate responsibility of maintaining and managing these resources for the American people."
