= Waimea Canyon State Park =

Protected area of Kauai County, Hawaii, United States

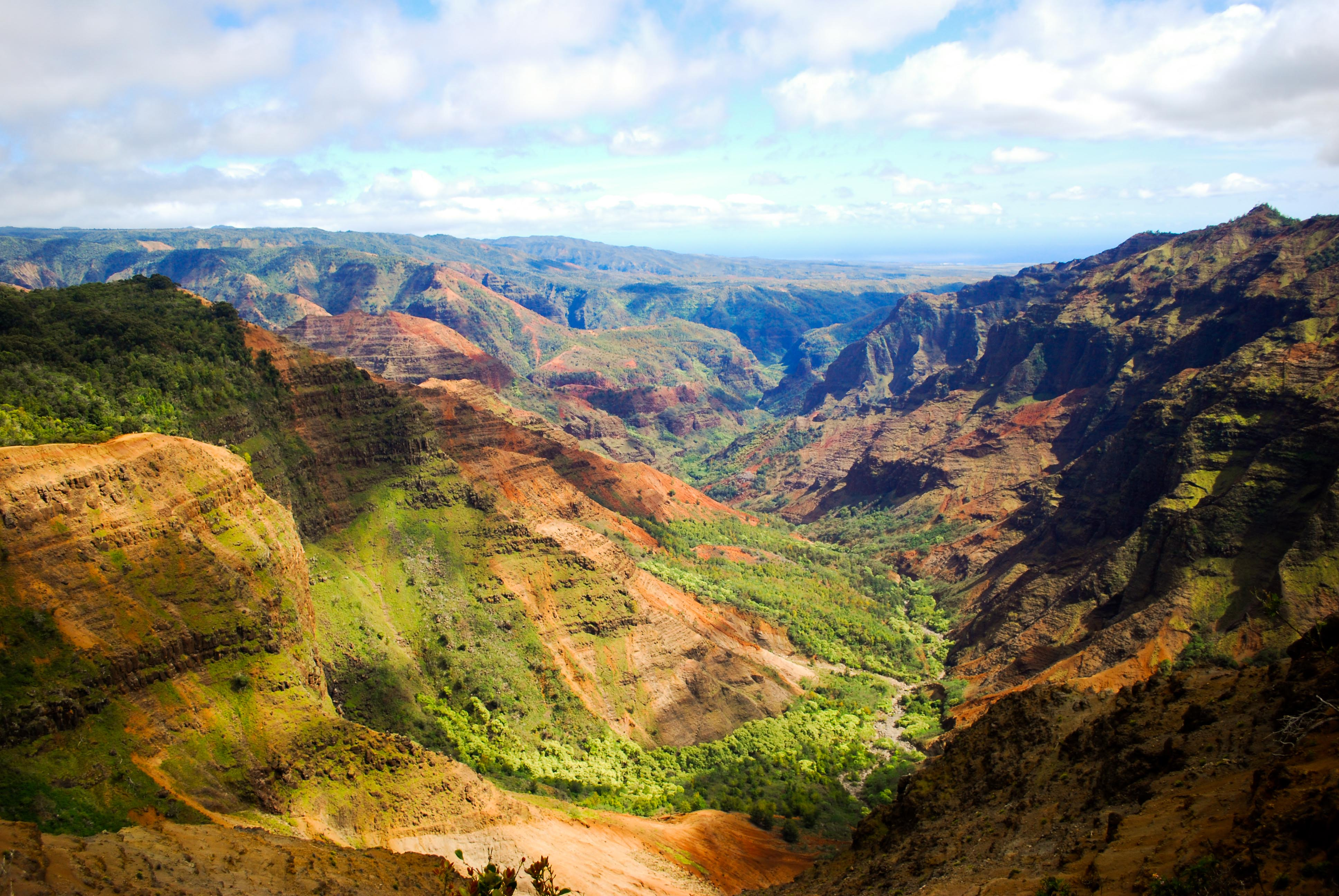

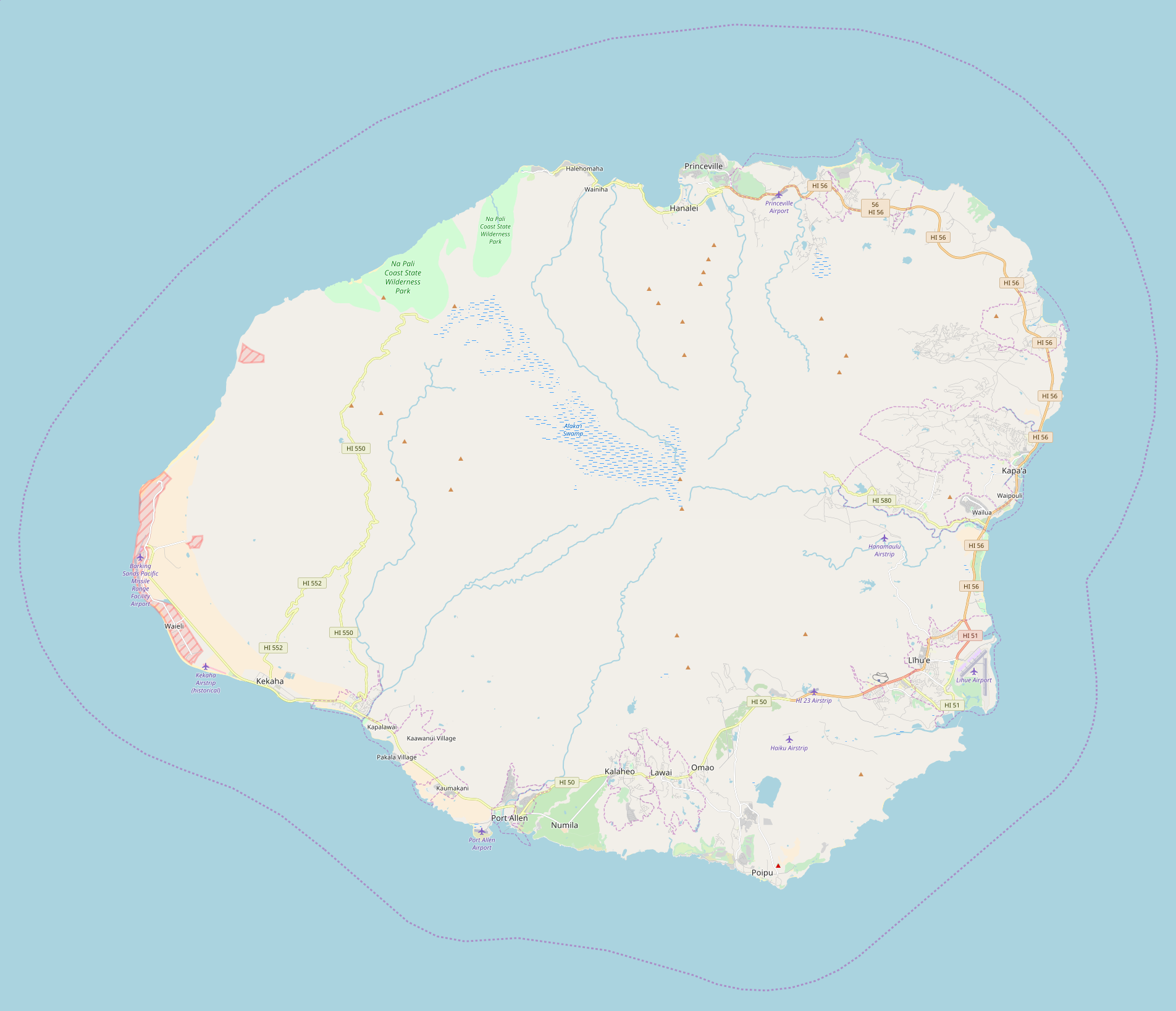
- Location within Kauai Location within Hawaii
- Location: Kauaʻi, Hawaiʻi
- Nearest city: Waimea
- Coordinates: 22°03′22″N 159°39′55″W
- Operator: Department of Land and Natural Resources - Division of State Parks
- Website: Hawaiʻi State Parks

Waimea Canyon, also known as the Grand Canyon of the Pacific, is a large canyon, approximately ten miles (16 km) long and up to 3,000 feet (910 m) deep, located on the western side of Kauaʻi in the Hawaiian Islands of the United States. Waimea is Hawaiian for "reddish water", a reference to the erosion of the canyon's red soil. The canyon was formed by a deep incision of the Waimea River arising from the extreme rainfall on the island's central peak, Mount Waiʻaleʻale, among the wettest places on earth.

== Geology ==
The canyon is carved into the tholeiitic and post-shield calc-alkaline lavas of the canyon basalt. The lavas of the canyon provide evidence of massive faulting and collapse in the island's early history. The west side of the canyon is all thin, west-dipping lavas of the Napali Member. In contrast, the east side is very thick, flat-lying lavas of the Olokele and Makaweli Members. The two sides are separated by an enormous fault along which a large part of the island moved downwards in a big collapse.

The canyon has a unique geologic history as it was formed not only by the steady process of erosion but also by the catastrophic collapse of the volcano that created Kauaʻi.

Like the other Hawaiian islands, Kauaʻi is the top of an enormous volcano rising from the ocean floor. With lava flows dated to about 5 million years ago, Kauaʻi is the oldest of the large Hawaiian islands. Roughly 4 million years ago, while Kauaʻi was still erupting almost continuously, a portion of the island collapsed. This collapse formed a depression which then filled with lava flows.

In the time since, rainwater from the slopes of Mount Waiʻaleʻale have eroded Waimea Canyon along one edge of the collapse. On the east side of the canyon, the cliff walls are built from thick lava flows that pooled in the depression. Over time, the exposed basalt has weathered from its original black to bright red.

== Geography ==
Waimea Canyon State Park encompasses 1,866 acres (7.55 km^{2}) and is a popular tourist attraction on the island. It provides a wilderness area with numerous hiking trails. It can be accessed from Waimea on Hawaiʻi state road 550, which is 18 miles long and leads up to Kōkeʻe State Park. The island of Niʻihau, only a short distance west of Kauaʻi at that point, can be clearly seen from the highway.

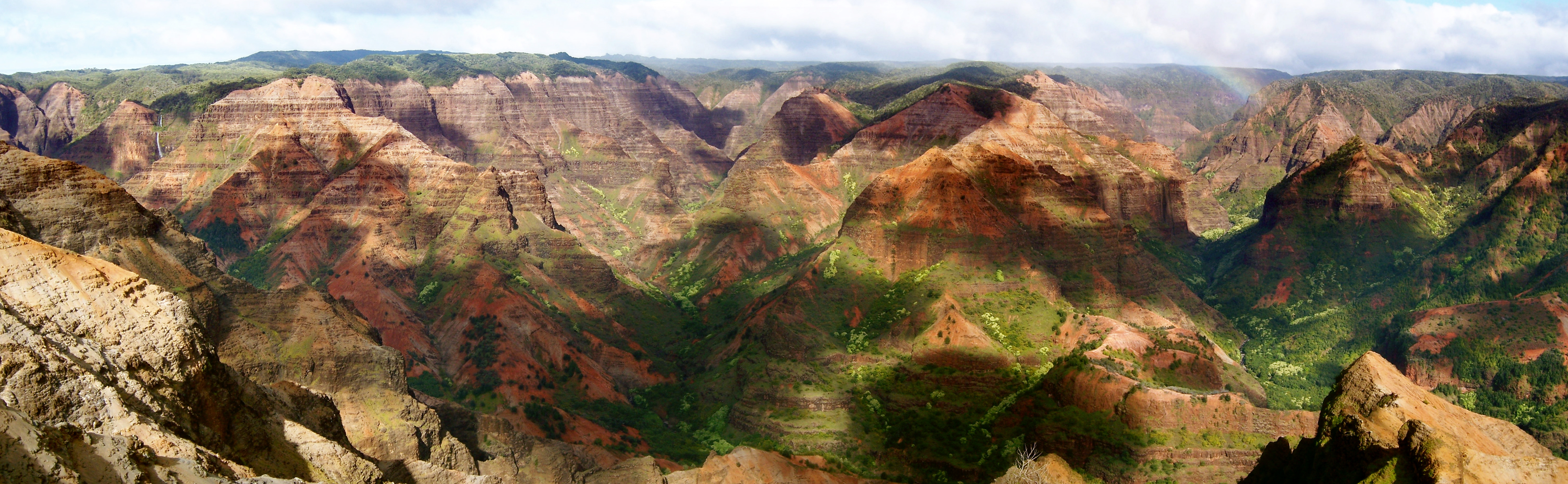
A panoramic view of Waimea Canyon

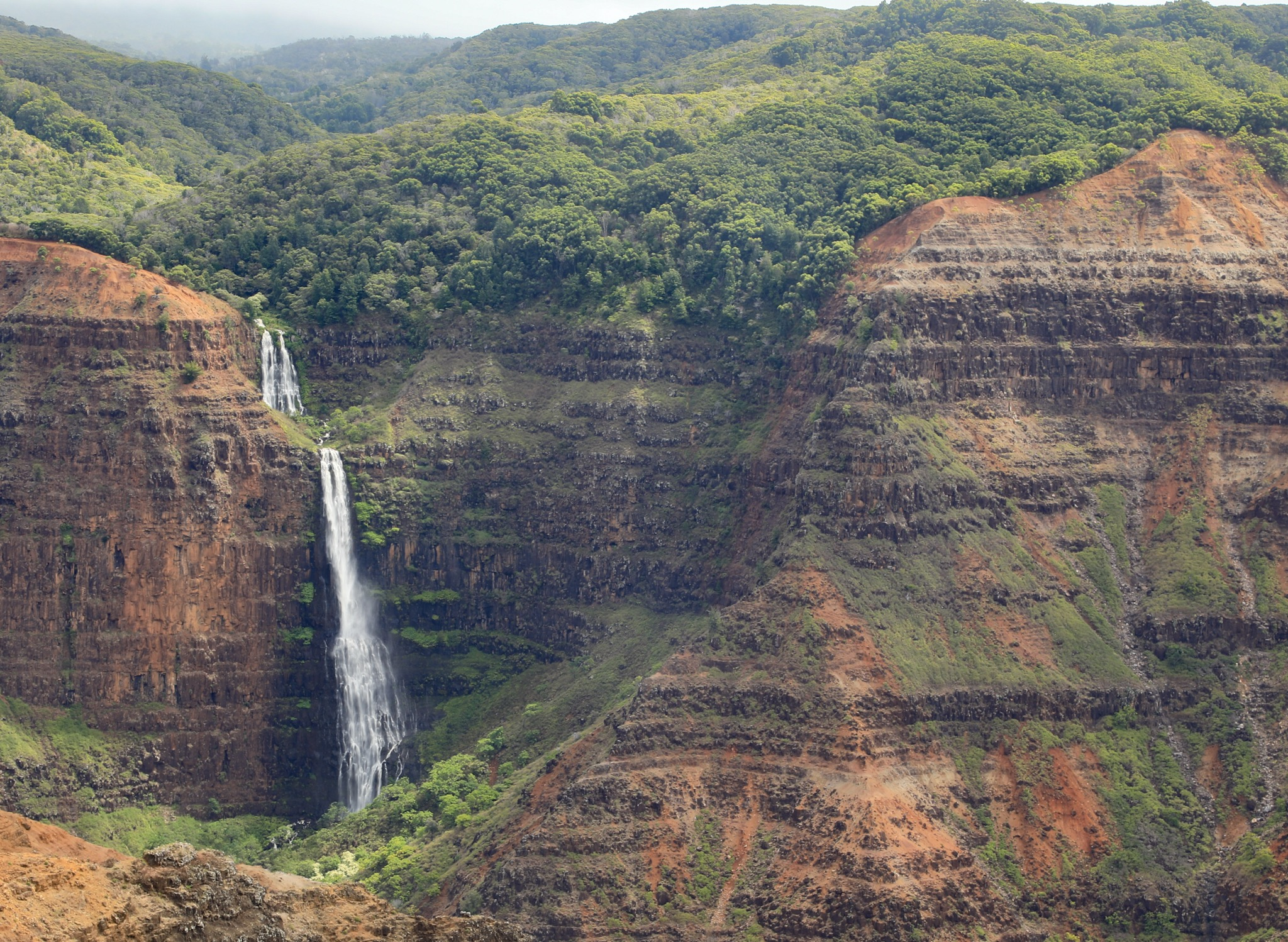
Falls at Waimea Canyon State Park

== Gallery ==
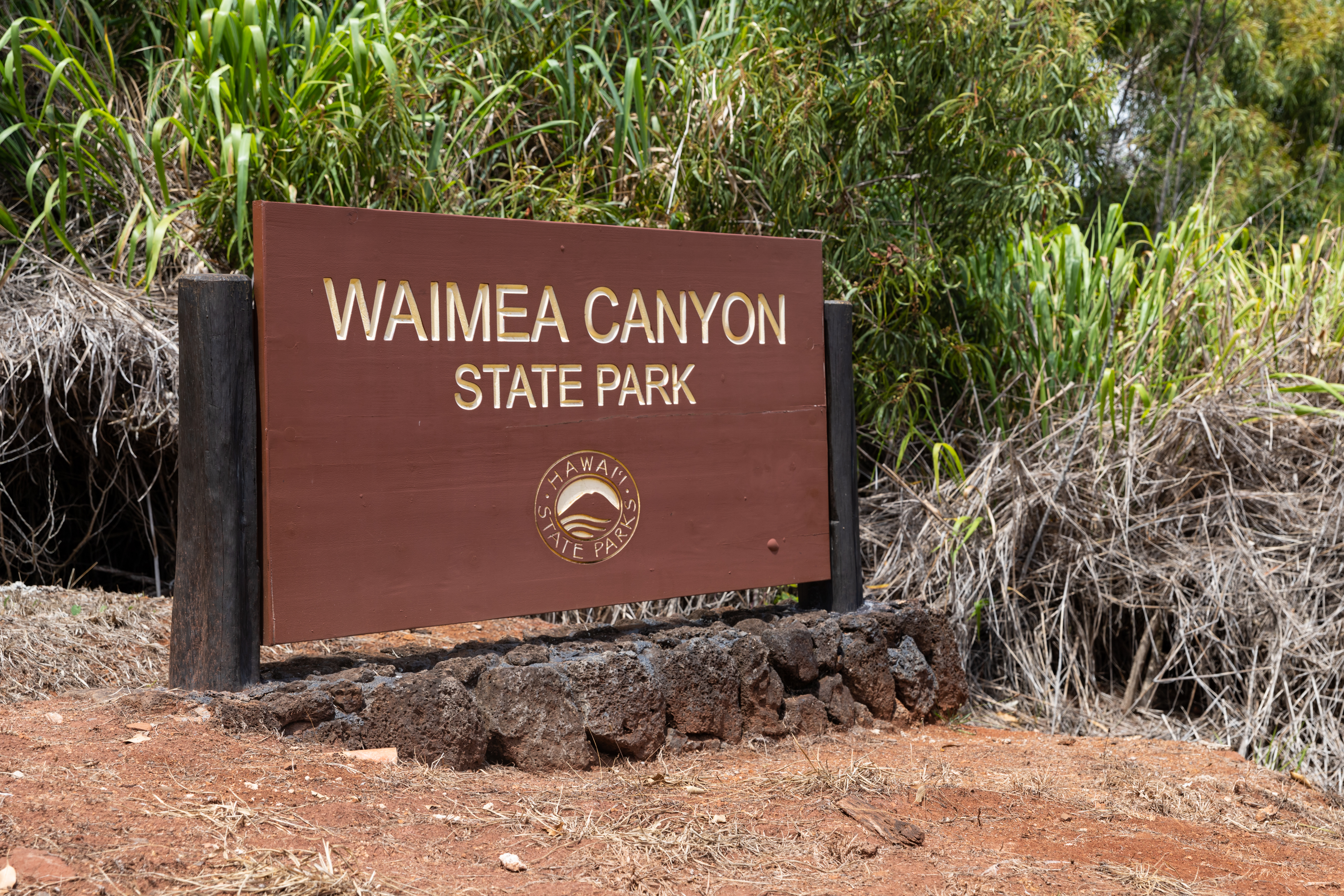
Waimea Canyon State Park, Kauai, Hawaii

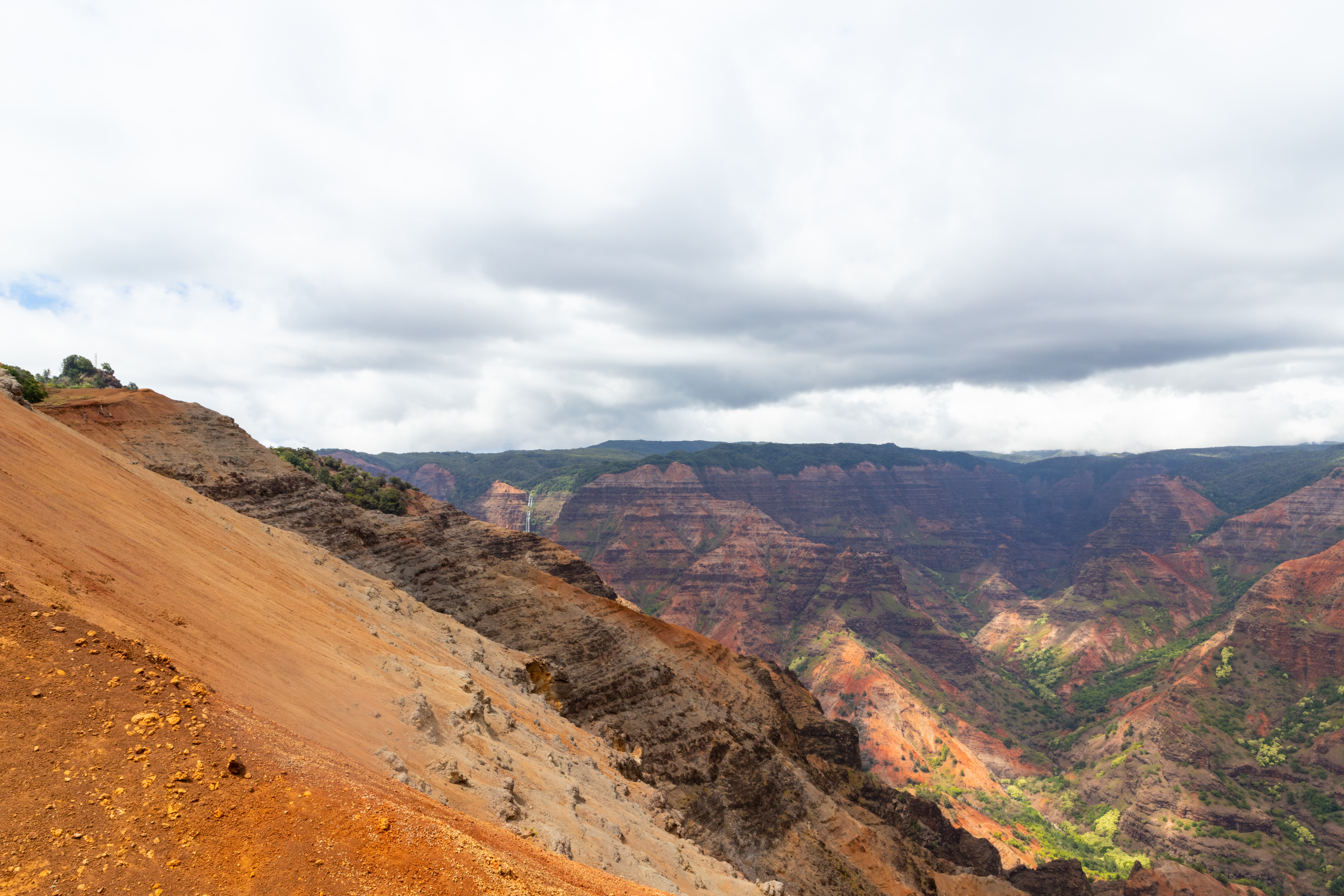
Red sand in Waimea Canyon Park Kauai, Hawaii

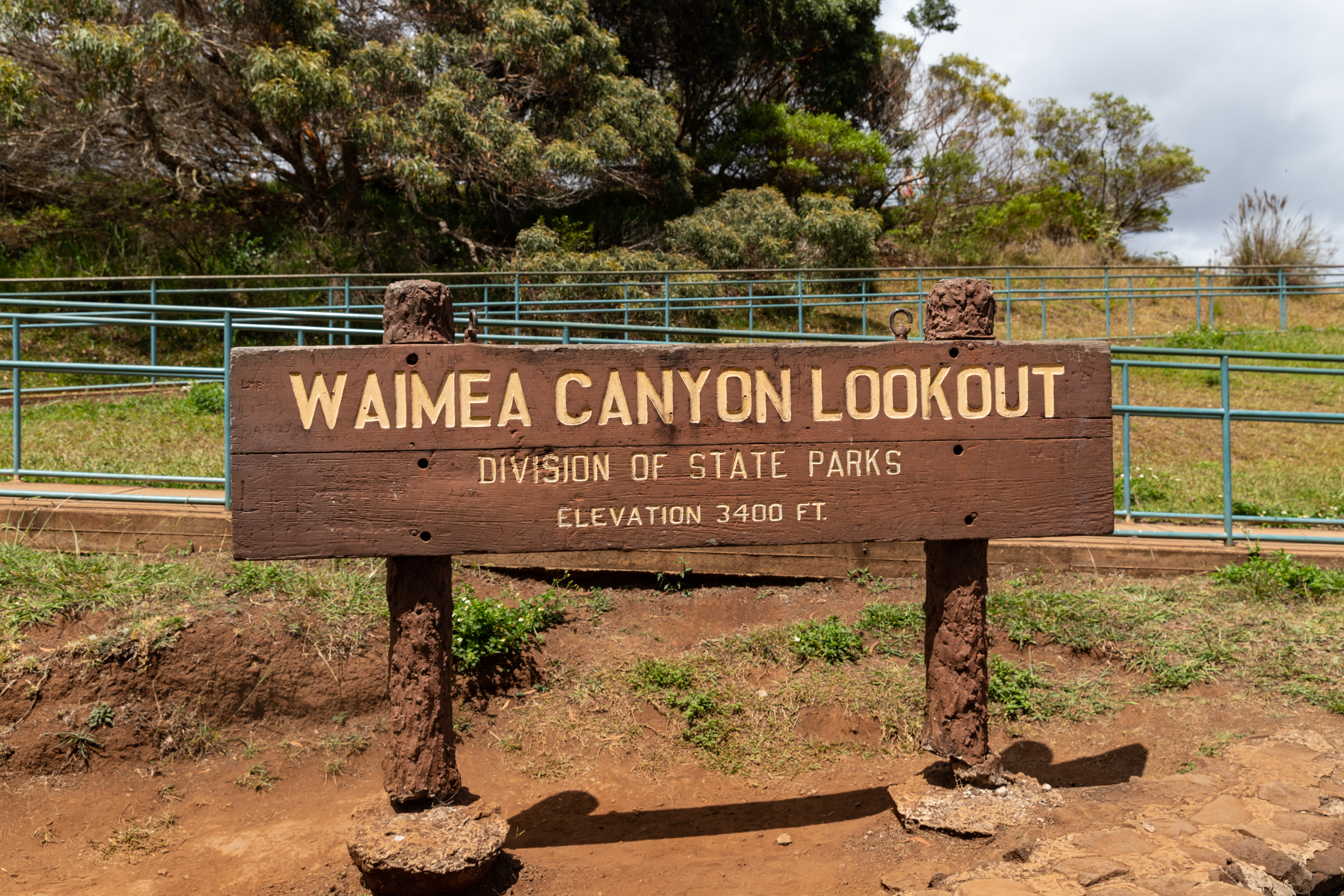
Waimea Canyon State Park Lookout, Kauai, Hawaii

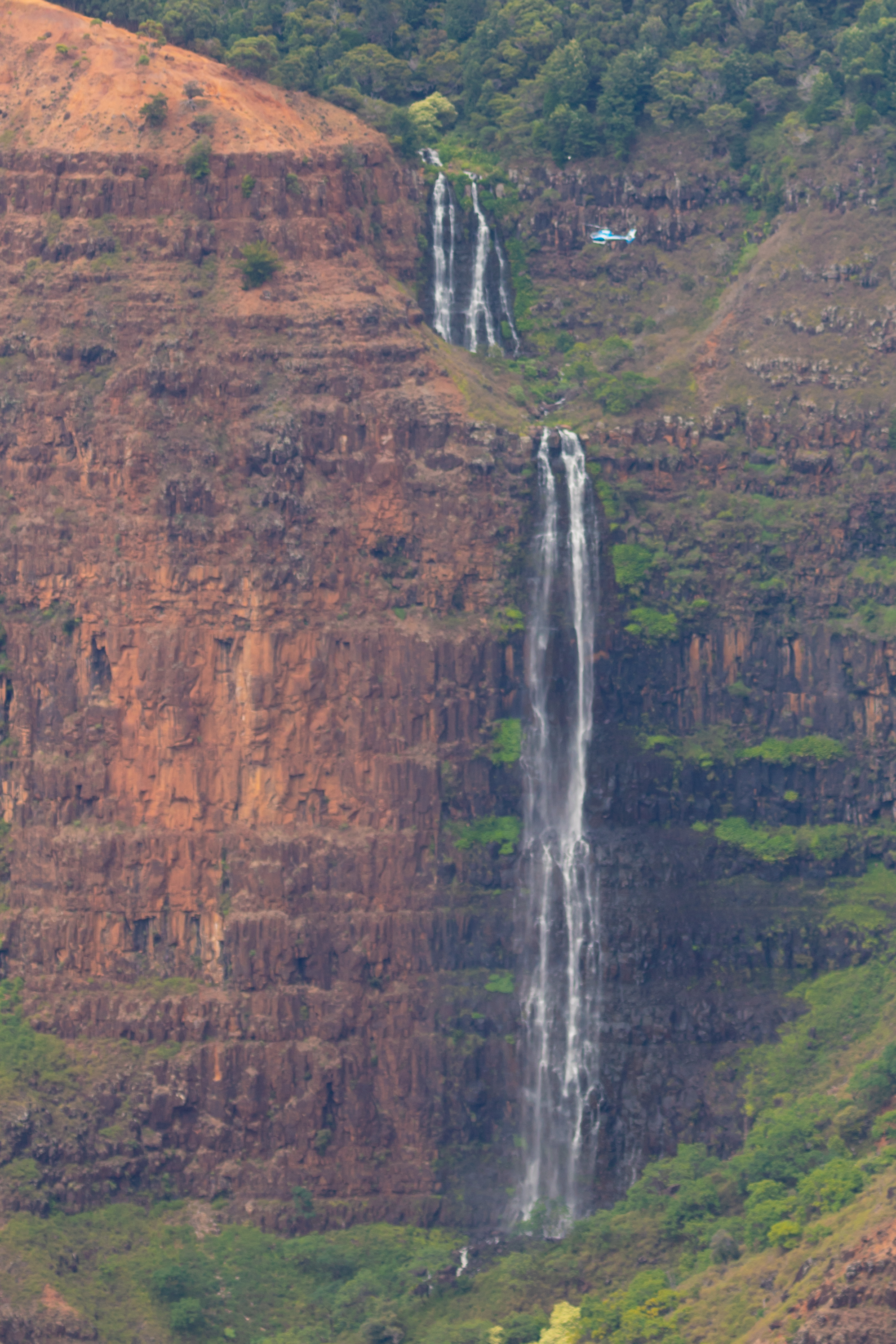
Helicopter tour to the Waipoo Falls, Kauai, Hawaii

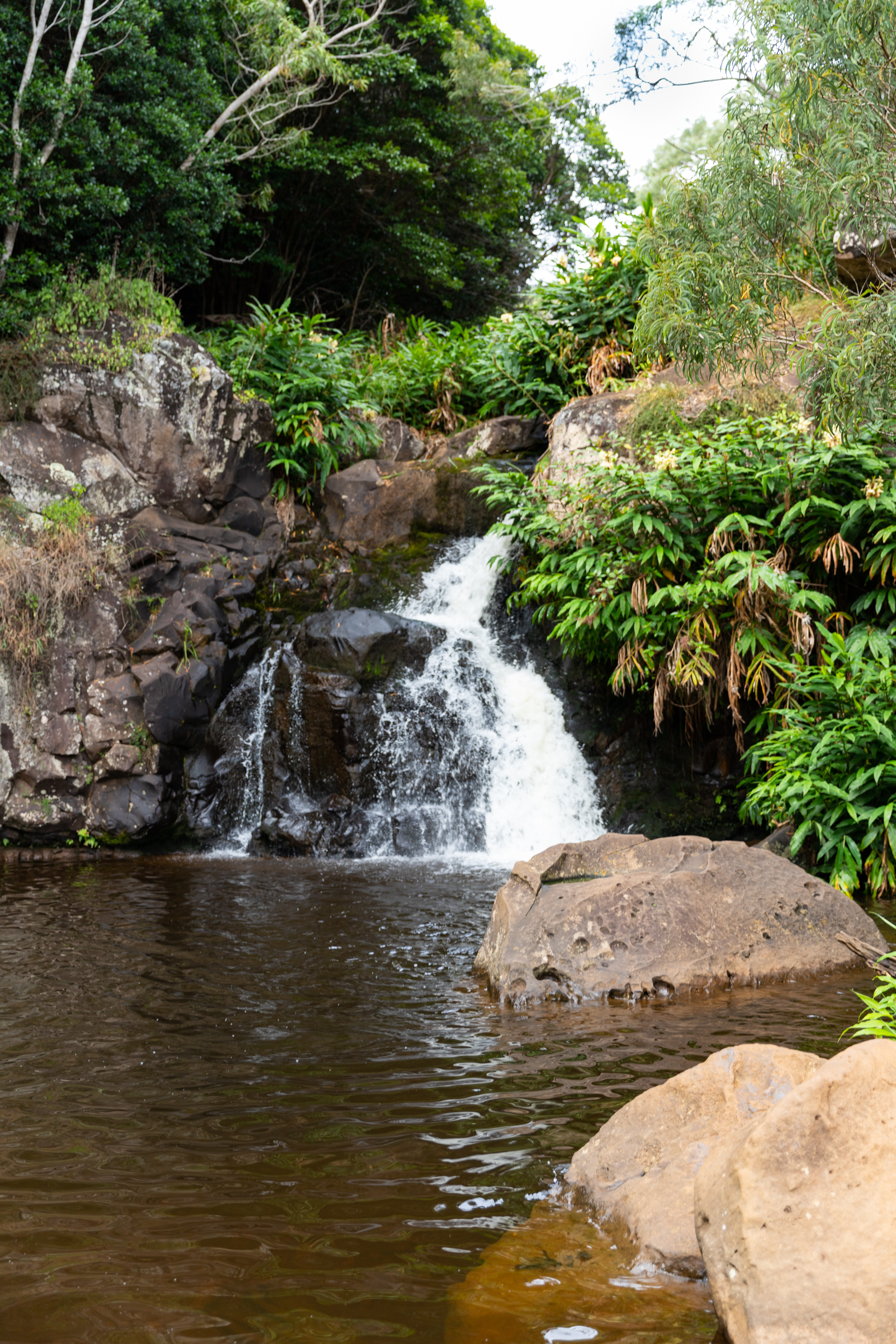
Upper Waipoo Falls, Waimea Canyon Park Kauai, Hawaii

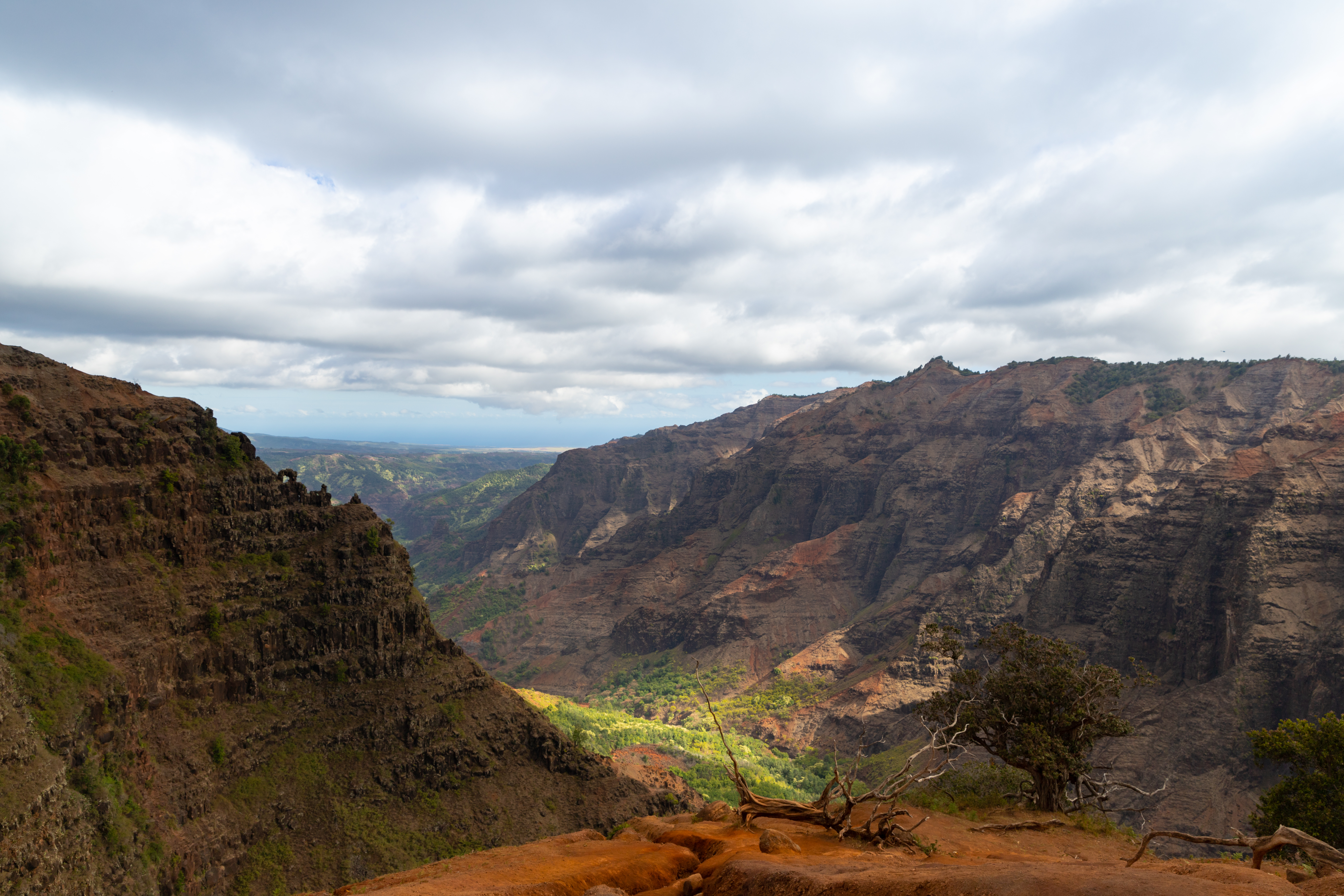
Canyon Trail to Waipoo Falls, Waimea Canyon Park Kauai, Hawaii
