= Youth Conservation Corps =

American paid youth work program

Youth Conservation Corps (YCC)
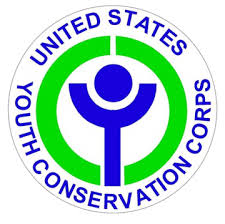
- Youth Conservation Corps patch

Agency overview
- Formed: August 13, 1971
- Parent agency: Department of Agriculture, Department of the Interior
- Website: National Park Service Youth Conservation Corps; Forest Service Youth Conservation Corps

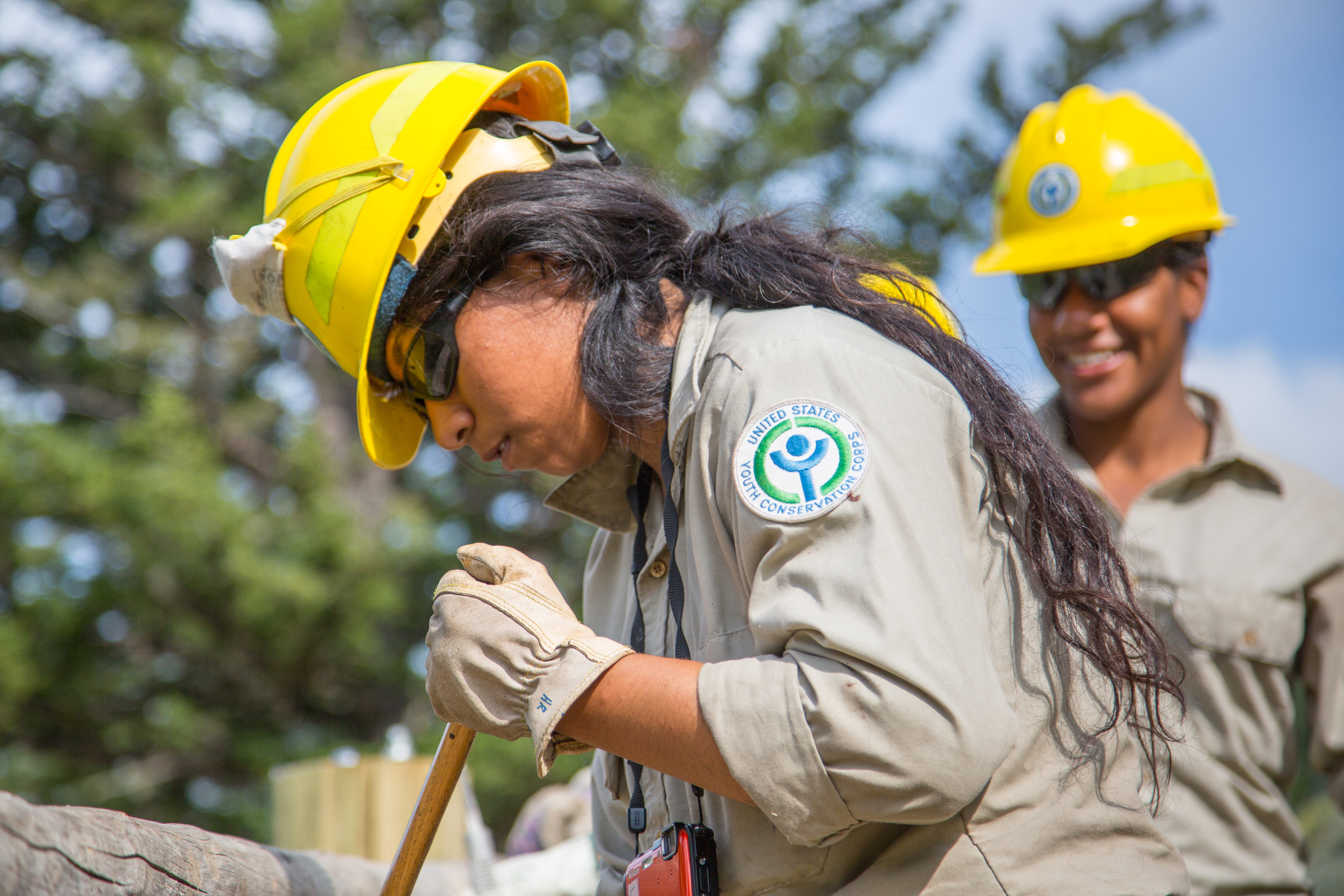
YCC crew working on fencing at Yellowstone National Park

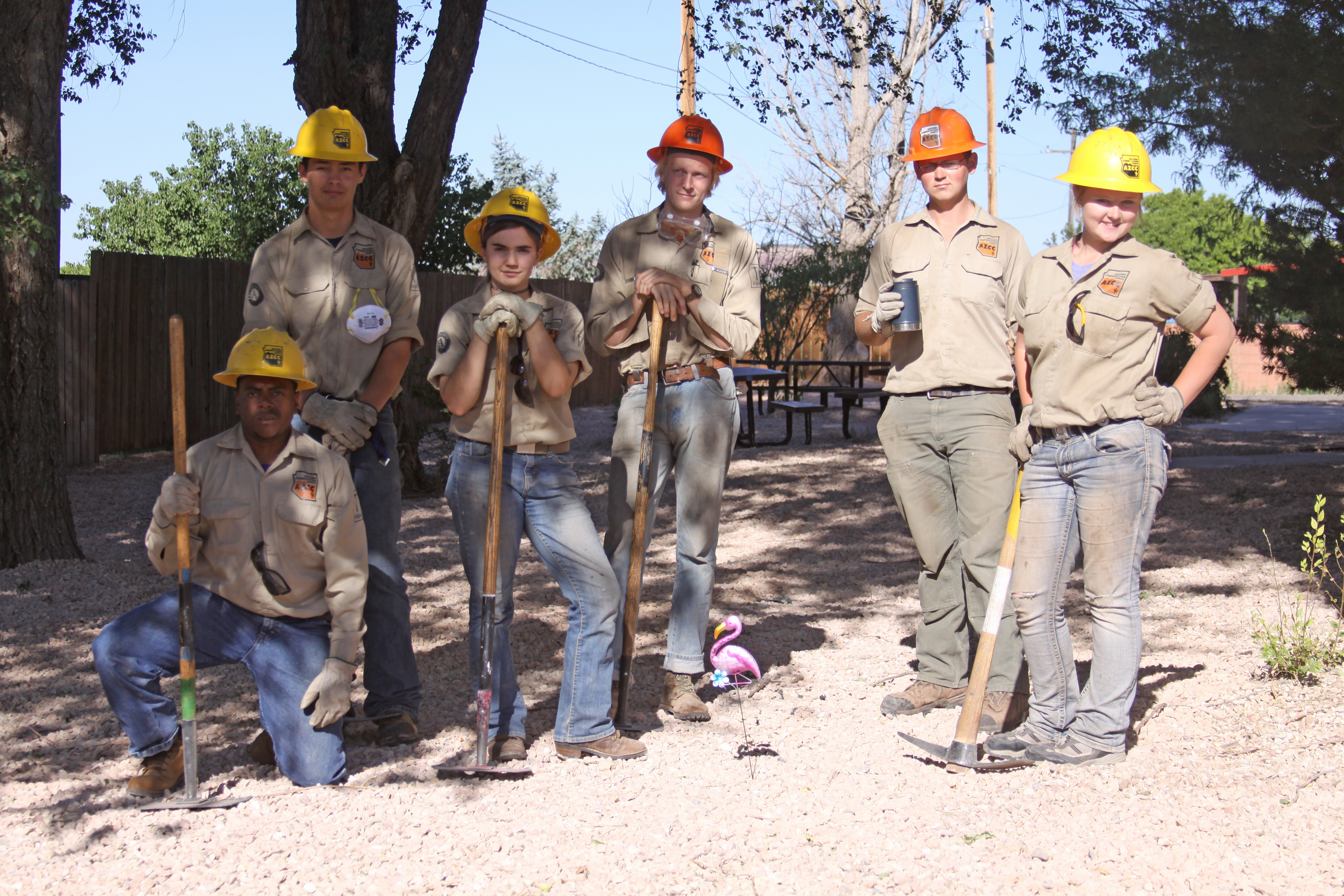
YCC crew at North Kaibab Trail

The Youth Conservation Corps (YCC) is a paid summer youth work program in federally managed lands. The National Park Service, US Forest Service, US Fish and Wildlife Service and Bureau of Land Management employ teens each summer to participate in the YCC. The YCC has introduced young Americans to conservation opportunities in public lands since the program was created in 1970. In the late seventies and early eighties the program included a grant-in-aid component that funded state and local YCC projects nationwide. This element fell to 1982 budget cuts, but several states continued the effort with their own funds. Some employees currently working in land management agencies were introduced to their profession through the YCC.

Youth Conservation Corps members work in public lands restoring, rehabilitating, and repairing the natural, cultural, and historical resources protected as federally preserved places. Some examples of work completed each season by Youth Conservation Corps are:

- Historic Structure Preservation
- Exotic Plant Removal
- Fence Construction
- Boundary Marking Signage
- Boardwalk Repair
- Wildlife Research Assistance
- Anthropologic Research Assistance
- Bridge Construction
- Trail Construction
- Campsite/Campground Restoration
- Environmental Education Planning/Teaching
- Habitat Preservation
- IT Work
- Visitor Use Assistance
- Energy Retrofitting

Participants are paid the established federal minimum wage. Participants in states with a minimum wage higher than the federal are paid at the higher rate.

Youth Conservation Corps programs are conducted for 4–10 weeks during the summer. Participants must be between 15–18 years old at the start of the program, though the age limits can vary locally. Most YCC programs are non-residential; however the National Park Service does have one residential program at Yellowstone National Park. Select Forest Service units offer residential programs as well.

The Youth Conservation Corps focuses on conservation and community. These are some of the aspects they focus on:

- How the work projects benefits the site or the overall environment.
- Appreciating and understanding the nation’s environmental and historic heritage.
- Gaining an understanding and appreciation of Ecosystems and Community.

Recruitment for the YCC within the National Park Service is done at individual sites participating in the program. The National Park Service webpage provides information about how to enroll in the Youth Conservation Corps. Applications may be found on the NPS webpage and must be sent to parks of interest by April 15. Enrollees are selected without regard to civil service or classification laws, rules or regulation. The Forest Service operates a consolidated application process through the web. YCC is a partnership between the US Department of Interior and US Department of Agriculture established by Public Law 93-408. Since its inception, the YCC has worked with many conservation agencies throughout the country to provide educational and team building skills to young people through participation in work projects.
