= Kōkeʻe Ditch =

Canal in Kauai County, Hawaii

Coordinates: 22°04′54″N 159°40′35″W

The Kōkeʻe Ditch is an irrigation canal on the island of Kauaʻi.

In 1923, construction began on the Kōkeʻe Ditch system to open the mauka hills to sugar cane production.

By 1926, the Kōkeʻe Ditch was completed, diverting water from Mohihi Stream and the headwaters of the Waimea River in the Alakaʻi Swamp at an altitude of about 3400 feet. About one-fourth of the Kōkeʻe Ditch supply irrigated the highland sugar cane fields below Puʻu ʻŌpae reservoir on Niu Ridge, and the balance irrigated the highland fields east of Kōkeʻe Road.
