= Waimea River (Kauaʻi) =

Major river on the island of Kauaʻi in the U.S. state of Hawaii

Waimea
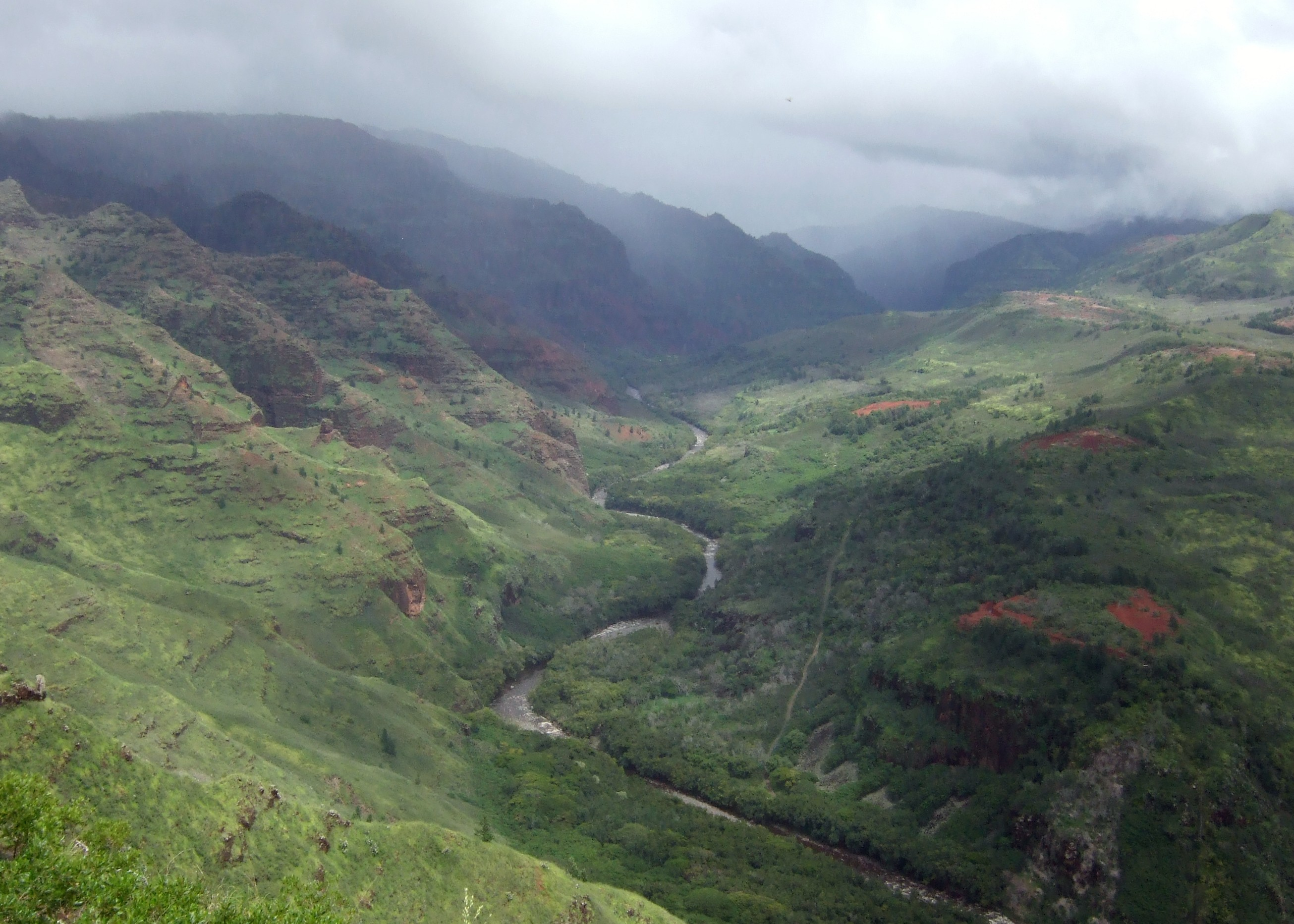

- Location of mouth

Location
- Country: United States
- State: Hawaii
- Region: Kauaʻi

Physical characteristics
- Source: Alaka'i Swamp (confluence of the Waiahulu and Po'omau streams)
  - coordinates: 22°05′25″N 159°39′19″W
- Mouth
  - location: Waimea, Kauaʻi County, Hawaii
  - coordinates: 21°57′17″N 159°39′35″W
- Length: 35.7 km (22.2 mi)
- Basin size: 227 km^{2} (88 sq mi)

Basin features
- Tributaries
  - left: Makaweli River

The Waimea River is the largest and the longest river on the island of Kauaʻi in the U.S. state of Hawaii. At 35.7 km (22.2 mi) in length, it is the 3rd longest river in the Hawaiian Islands, draining one sixth of the total area of the island.

It rises in a wet plateau of the island's central highlands, in the Alakaʻi Swamp, the largest high-elevation swamp in the world. It flows south, passing through the spectacular 3,000-foot-deep (910 m) Waimea Canyon, known as the "Grand Canyon of the Pacific."

The valleys of the Waimea River and its tributary, the Makaweli River, were once heavily populated. It enters the Pacific Ocean at Waimea, near the 1778 landing place of Captain Cook on Kauaʻi.
