= Waimea, Kauaʻi County, Hawaii =

Waimea
- Census-designated place
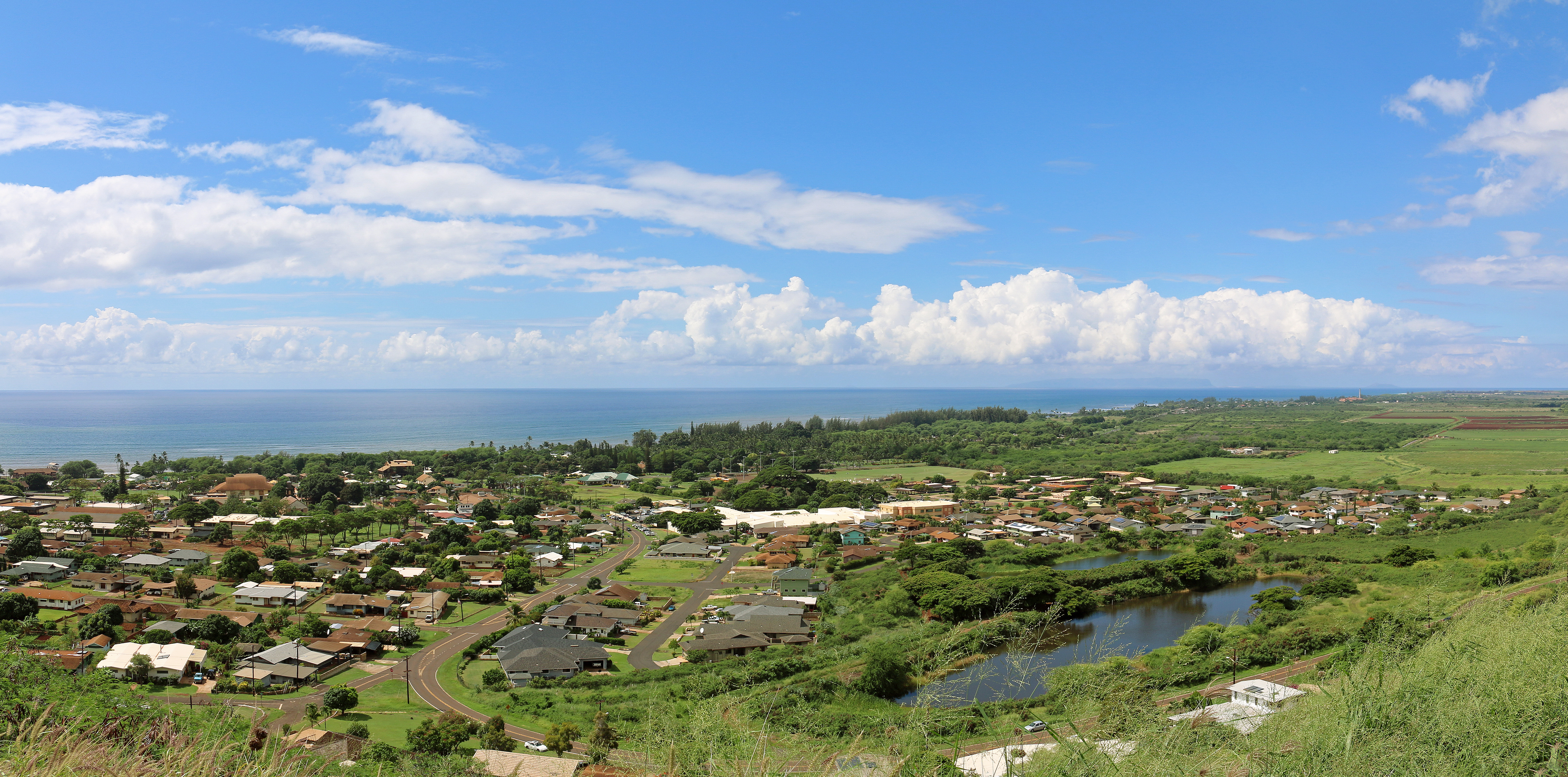
- View overlooking the town and Waimea Bay

- Location in Kauaʻi County and the state of Hawaii
- Coordinates: 21°57′18″N 159°40′4″W
- Country: United States
- State: Hawaii
- Counties: Kauaʻi

Area
  - Total: 2.18 sq mi (5.64 km^{2})
  - Land: 1.85 sq mi (4.80 km^{2})
  - Water: 0.33 sq mi (0.85 km^{2})
- Elevation: 9 ft (2.7 m)

Population (2020)
  - Total: 2,057
  - Density: 1,110.8/sq mi (428.88/km^{2})
- ZIP Code: 96796
- Area code: 808
- FIPS code: 15-78800
- GNIS feature ID: 364794

Waimea (Hawaiian: [wɐjˈmɛjə, vɐjˈmɛjə], literally, "red water") is a census-designated place (CDP) in Kauaʻi County, Hawaii, United States. It is on the southwest coast of the island of Kauaʻi and had a population of 2,057 at the 2020 census. The first Europeans to reach Hawaii landed in Waimea in 1778 (giving rise to Kauaʻi's slogan "Hawaii's Original Visitor Destination").

== History ==
=== Original settlers ===
Between 200 and 600 AD, the first settlers arrived in Kaua‘i from the Marquesas Islands. It is not clear why the voyagers sought a new homeland. They brought taro, sweet potato, pigs, fowl, and seeds. They were experienced farmers and fishermen, with advanced irrigation techniques that allowed them to thrive on the land.

Around 1000 AD, Tahitian explorers arrived in Hawai‘i and conquered the Marquesans. According to Hawaiian legend, the small-in-stature Marquesans were chased into the hills by the Tahitians and became the "Menehune", thought to be responsible for bad luck. The Tahitians brought with them a social and political hierarchy with distinct rules and taboos, also called "kapu". It was forbidden for women and men to eat together, for women to eat pork or bananas, and for anyone to step on the shadow of a royal. This kapu system, with kings (ali‘i), thrived and ruled for hundreds of years before Western explorers first made contact in the Islands.

=== First Western contact ===
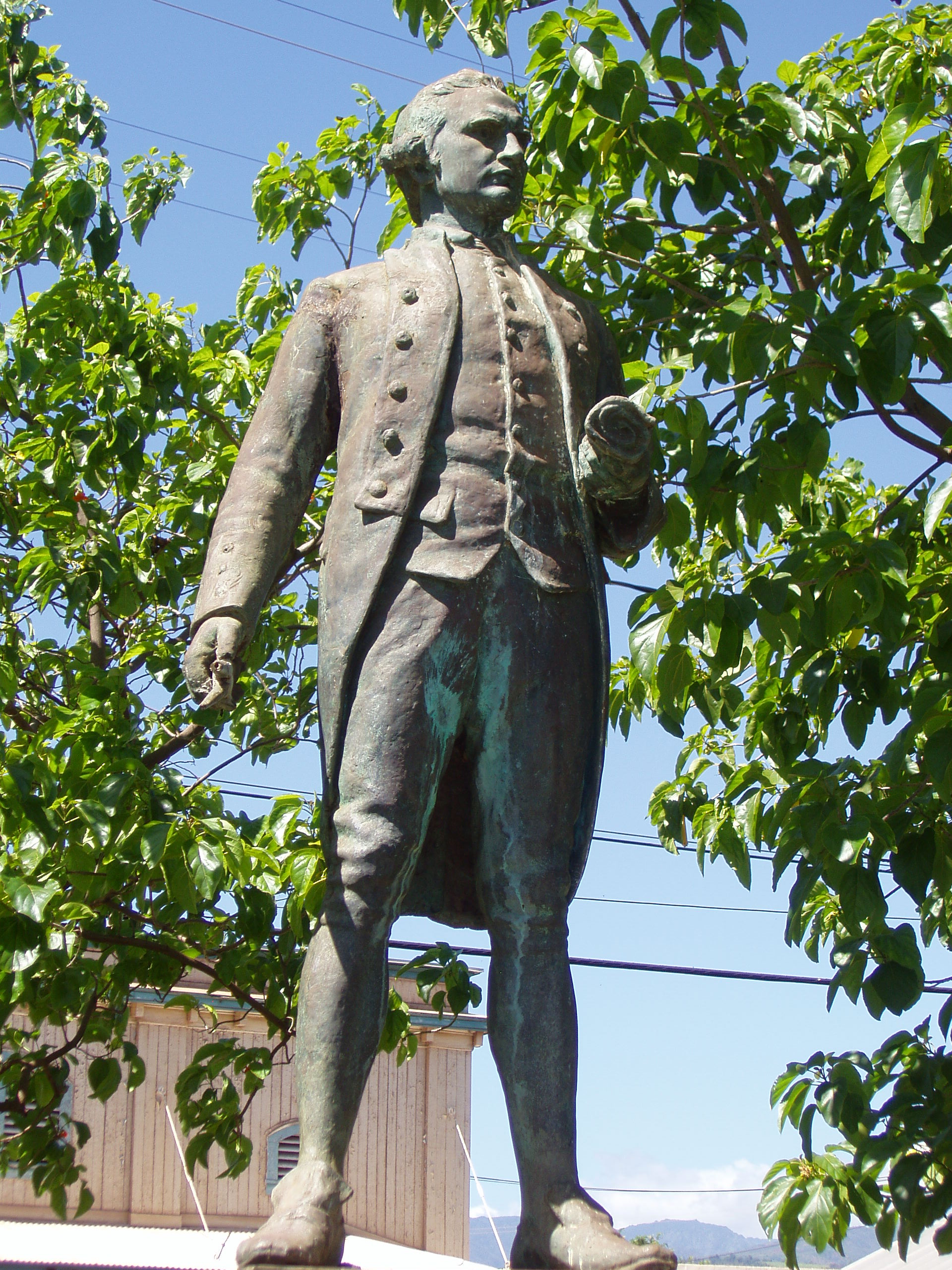
A statue of Captain James Cook stands in Waimea, Kauaʻi commemorating his first contact with the Hawaiian islands at the town's harbor in January 1778.

On January 20, 1778, the British explorer James Cook and his ships, HMS Discovery and Resolution, arrived at the mouth of the Waimea River on the western side of Kauaʻi. Originally, Cook sent three small craft to Waimea so that his men could determine whether the ships could dock there. They found a freshwater lagoon alongside a native village, so Cook and his men anchored their ships and went ashore on smaller craft.

Cook's mission is thought to be one of scientific and social exploration. His men documented the flora and fauna of the Waimea area and tried to translate the language of the natives. Cook's first contact with the islands was friendly and is responsible for a vast resource of information about the flora, fauna, and culture of Hawai‘i, but it also marks the beginning of the period of colonization of Hawai‘i and its people. The arrival of Europeans also introduced venereal disease and tuberculosis, which decimated the native Hawaiian population.

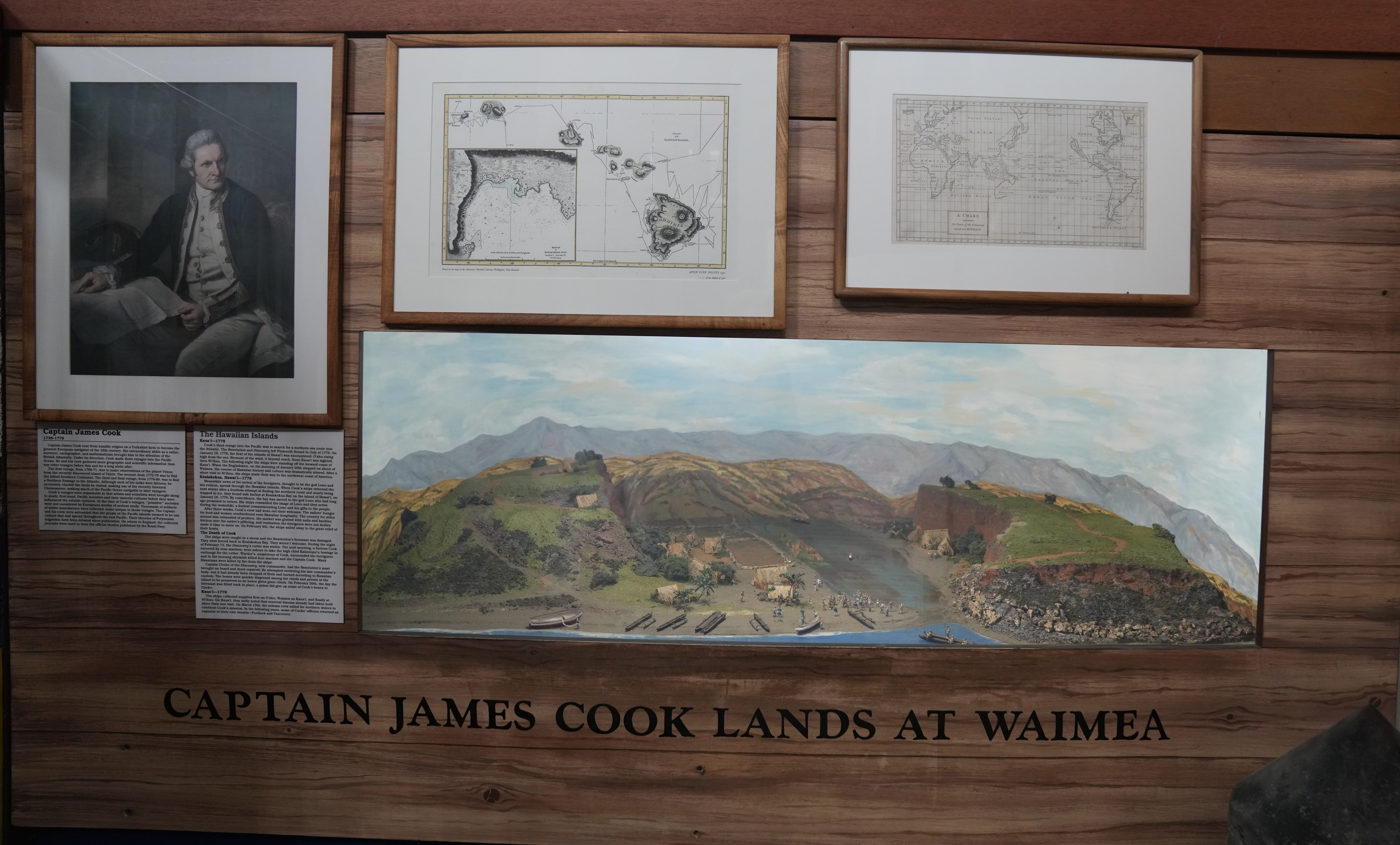
Captain James Cook Lands at Waimea Bay, Kauaʻi on January 20, 1778, an exhibit at the Kauai Museum

== Economy ==
Waimea was an important trading post for the maritime fur trade, whaling and sandalwood industries in the late 1700s and early 1800s and in the later 1800s for the sugar industry. In 1815 the fur trading vessel Atahualpa, purchased by the Russian–American Company and renamed Bering, wrecked at Waimea. Waimea's main industries now are construction and tourism. There are two hotels in town: Waimea Plantation Cottages and The West Inn motel. There are several shops, small restaurants, and food trucks.

== Geography ==
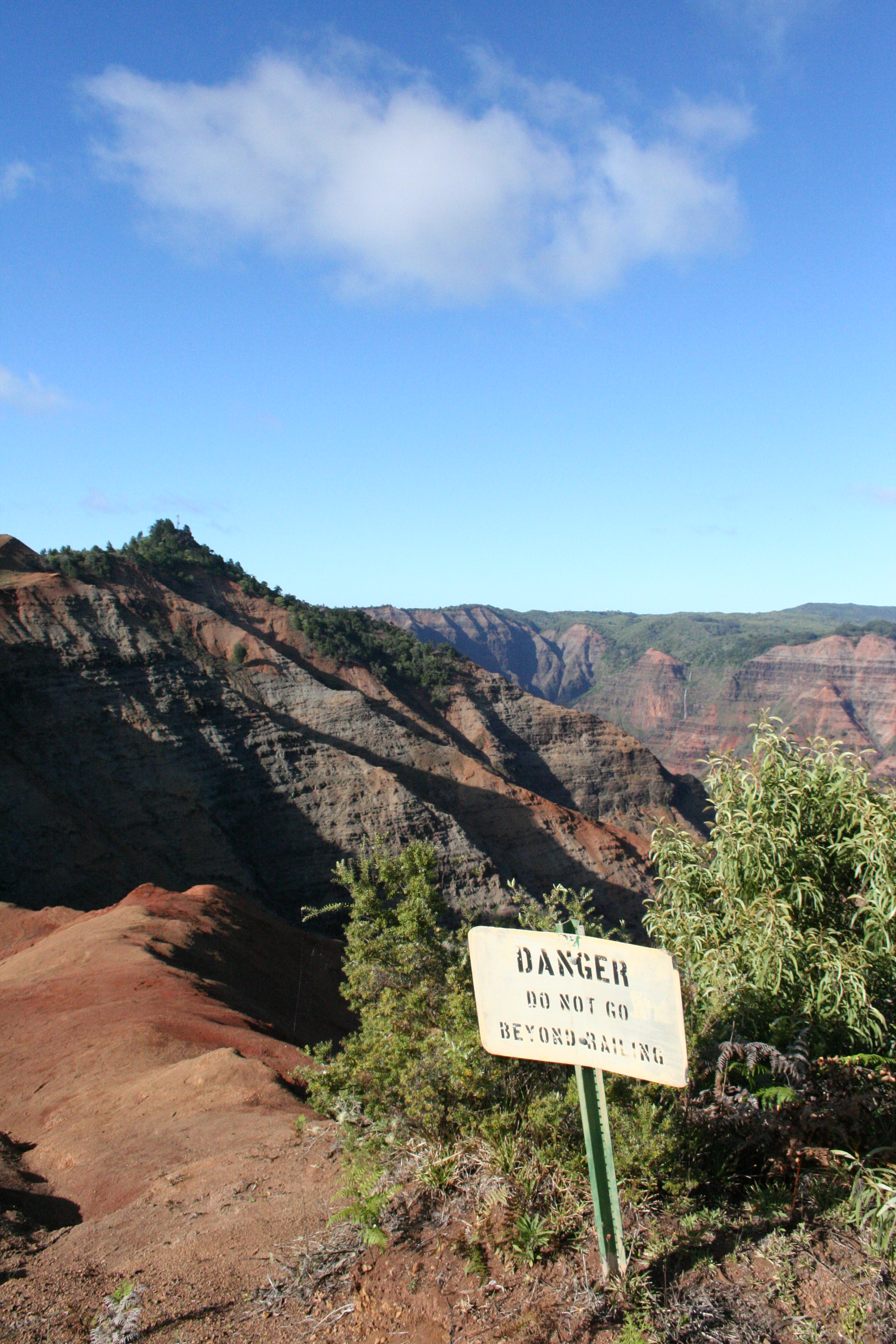
Along a ridgeline near Waimea

Waimea is on the southwest side of Kauaʻi at 21°57′42″N 159°40′25″W. It is bordered to the west by Kekaha, to the east by Pākalā Village, and to the south by the Pacific Ocean. The Waimea River forms the eastern border of the community.

According to the United States Census Bureau, the CDP has an area of 2.2 square miles (5.6 km^{2}), of which 1.9 square miles (4.8 km^{2}) is land and 0.3 square miles (0.8 km^{2}), or 15.09%, is water, as the CDP boundary extends into the Pacific Ocean.

== Climate ==
Waimea has a Tropical savanna climate (Köppen climate classification: As).

Climate data for Waimea, Hawaii, 1991–2020 normals, extremes 1969–2017
| Month | Jan | Feb | Mar | Apr | May | Jun | Jul | Aug | Sep | Oct | Nov | Dec | Year |
|---|---|---|---|---|---|---|---|---|---|---|---|---|---|
| Record high °F (°C) | 88 (31) | 87 (31) | 89 (32) | 91 (33) | 93 (34) | 95 (35) | 94 (34) | 94 (34) | 93 (34) | 92 (33) | 97 (36) | 88 (31) | 97 (36) |
| Mean maximum °F (°C) | 83.4 (28.6) | 83.0 (28.3) | 84.6 (29.2) | 85.7 (29.8) | 87.2 (30.7) | 88.8 (31.6) | 89.6 (32.0) | 90.2 (32.3) | 90.1 (32.3) | 89.0 (31.7) | 87.1 (30.6) | 84.7 (29.3) | 90.9 (32.7) |
| Mean daily maximum °F (°C) | 79.5 (26.4) | 79.5 (26.4) | 80.1 (26.7) | 82.2 (27.9) | 83.9 (28.8) | 85.6 (29.8) | 87.0 (30.6) | 87.4 (30.8) | 87.3 (30.7) | 85.6 (29.8) | 83.2 (28.4) | 80.6 (27.0) | 83.5 (28.6) |
| Daily mean °F (°C) | 70.8 (21.6) | 70.5 (21.4) | 71.9 (22.2) | 73.4 (23.0) | 75.3 (24.1) | 77.1 (25.1) | 78.3 (25.7) | 78.5 (25.8) | 78.3 (25.7) | 76.9 (24.9) | 74.7 (23.7) | 72.4 (22.4) | 74.8 (23.8) |
| Mean daily minimum °F (°C) | 62.0 (16.7) | 61.5 (16.4) | 63.6 (17.6) | 64.5 (18.1) | 66.7 (19.3) | 68.6 (20.3) | 69.6 (20.9) | 69.7 (20.9) | 69.3 (20.7) | 68.2 (20.1) | 66.3 (19.1) | 64.3 (17.9) | 66.2 (19.0) |
| Mean minimum °F (°C) | 57.2 (14.0) | 56.5 (13.6) | 58.8 (14.9) | 60.2 (15.7) | 62.3 (16.8) | 64.8 (18.2) | 66.0 (18.9) | 66.6 (19.2) | 65.6 (18.7) | 64.1 (17.8) | 62.1 (16.7) | 58.5 (14.7) | 54.4 (12.4) |
| Record low °F (°C) | 43 (6) | 43 (6) | 52 (11) | 49 (9) | 53 (12) | 57 (14) | 56 (13) | 59 (15) | 58 (14) | 52 (11) | 52 (11) | 53 (12) | 43 (6) |
Source 1: NOAA
Source 2: XMACIS2 (mean maxima/minima 1981–2010)

== Demographics ==
Historical population
| Census | Pop. | Note | %± |
|---|---|---|---|
| 2020 | 2,057 | | — |
U.S. Decennial Census

As of the census of 2000, there were 1,787 people, 620 households, and 456 families residing in the CDP. The population density was 1,707.2 inhabitants per square mile (659.2/km^{2}). There were 676 housing units at an average density of 645.8 per square mile (249.3/km^{2}). The racial makeup of the CDP was 12.7% White, 0.1% African American, 0.2% Native American, 43.0% Asian, 12.3% Pacific Islander, 1.1% from other races, and 30.6% from two or more races. Hispanic or Latino of any race were 7.2% of the population.

There were 620 households, out of which 33.2% had children under the age of 18 living with them, 52.3% were married couples living together, 15.6% had a female householder with no husband present, and 26.3% were non-families. 22.1% of all households were made up of individuals, and 10.5% had someone living alone who was 65 years of age or older. The average household size was 2.80 and the average family size was 3.27.

In the CDP the population was spread out, with 26.1% under the age of 18, 7.2% from 18 to 24, 22.4% from 25 to 44, 24.8% from 45 to 64, and 19.5% who were 65 years of age or older. The median age was 41 years. For every 100 females, there were 94.0 males. For every 100 females age 18 and over, there were 86.8 males.

The median income for a household in the CDP was $44,398, and the median income for a family was $46,591. Males had a median income of $38,542 versus $26,513 for females. The per capita income for the CDP was $18,778. About 8.1% of families and 11.5% of the population were below the poverty line, including 16.2% of those under age 18 and 8.7% of those age 65 or over.

== Culture ==
Every February Waimea hosts a celebration of Hawaiian culture at the Waimea Town Celebration. The festival began in 1978 and has become a nine-day event. Activities include a celebration of Kaumuali‘iu, Kaua‘i's last king, a film festival, several concerts, a lei-making contest for paniolo (cowboy) hats, a rodeo, a canoe race, and numerous other sporting events.

The Historic Waimea Theater opened on September 2, 1938, and is one of only two remaining movie theaters on Kaua‘i. The theater was damaged by Hurricane Iniki in 1992, and the owner planned to tear it down. West Kaua‘i Main Street leased the building in 1993 and began to restore the theater. The County of Kaua‘i purchased the building in 1996, and in August 1999, it reopened to the public under the management of West Kauai Business & Professional Association.

== Education ==
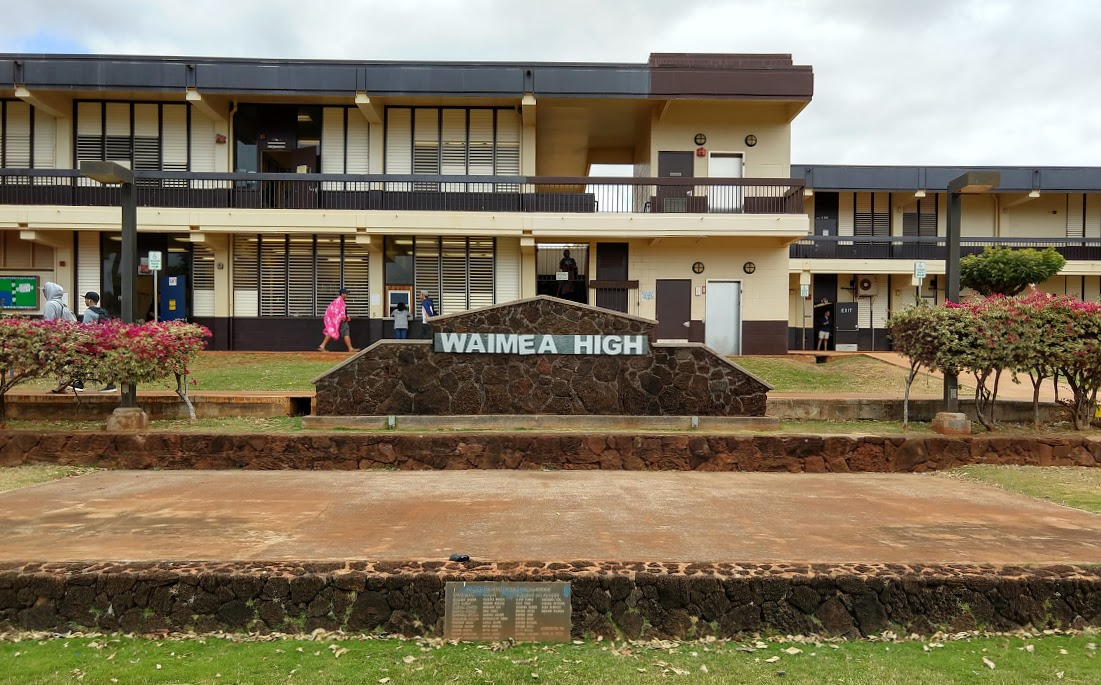
Waimea High School

Hawaii has one statewide school district, Hawaii State Department of Education. Waimea has two public schools: Waimea Canyon Middle School and Waimea High School (the westernmost high school in the United States).

Hawaii State Public Library System operates the Waimea Library.

== See also ==
- Hofgaard Park, Waimea, Kauaʻi
