= World Golf Tour =

2008 video game

- Developers: Chad Nelson and YuChiang Cheng
- Publisher: World Golf Tour Media
- Engine: Unity
- Release: 2008
- Genre: Sports (Golf)
- Modes: Online single-player and Online multiplayer

World Golf Tour (abbreviated WGT or WGT Golf) is an online multiplayer virtual golf game. It is played virtually on actual golf courses located in the United States, the United Kingdom, the Netherlands, Canada and Mexico, using a patented 3D photorealistic georeferencing technology. Players can play with their family or friends, join a foursome, or start their own game. Players can choose and compete in a variety of virtual golf courses with up to four players at a time, play individually or enter into a skills challenge or in tournaments for prizes.

Co-founders of World Golf Tour Chad Nelson and YuChiang Cheng collaborated in 2006 to come up with a high-quality golf game simulation that could be played for free on the Internet, and compete with or surpass the visual quality of console video sports games. Part of the intended goal was to have a fully integrated social golfing network website. They recruited JF Prata and Phil Gorrow of Electronic Arts to build the physics game engine that interfaces the thousands of photographs of each golf course that are used to create the WGT Golf experience. World Golf Tour launched a demo of the site in 2007 and commenced an open beta test in October 2008. The first golf course World Golf Tour captured and developed for play was the Ocean Course at Kiawah Island Golf Resort, located in South Carolina.

Because of its authenticity in photographing and using actual golf courses for game development, WGT Golf differs from standard console video sports games that are produced fully by computer graphics, rendered by animators. Using this particular process of game development, it can allow real golfers to play virtually on real golf courses at WGT Golf and then take that knowledge and experience out to the actual golf courses themselves to test their skills and ability. Members of the PGA have even practiced at WGT Golf before going to tournaments.

World Golf Tour does not charge a fee to play the HD courses it has developed (although there is a green fee for licensed non-HD courses). World Golf Tour derives revenue from high-profile online tournament sponsors, advertisements, and in-game micro transactions for upgrading player golfing equipment and for different choices in costume avatar clothing. Tournament cash prizes can be won and then used to buy virtual goods, like new clubs and clothing to customize the in-game avatar. In January 2011, a foursome completed the 100 millionth virtual round of golf played on WGT Golf. In October 2013, World Golf Tour Media released the mobile version for tablets and smartphones.

== Game development ==
WGT Golf is developed using Adobe Creative Suite 4 Web Premium software. World Golf Tour starts the process of game development by taking thousands of high definition photos of actual golf courses using helicopters equipped with cameras and GPS tracking systems. World Golf Tour then textures the photographs onto the 3D environment, using Adobe Premiere Pro to determine how each of the different surfaces will have an effect on the ball. The terrain is within 1-1.5 inch vertical accuracy of the real world. Computer animation, using Adobe Flash CS4 Professional, is then used to create the avatars that are used as the golfer for each player.

To replicate how the golf ball reacts to the club swing, rolls across the green, or bounces down the fairway, World Golf Tour ran various tests to measure impact and collision data. The data were then entered into WGT's newly created game physics engine to determine how each player's golf swing would affect ball travel based on input by the player.

Lastly Adobe Flash is then used to stream audio and video together for a seamless transition from picture to picture during game play, as a player moves down the fairway or makes a putt.

=== Tiers and levels ===
WGT Golf players are assigned to "tiers" reflecting their skill. From lowest to highest, the tiers are Hack, Amateur, Pro, Tour Pro, Master, Tour Master, Legend, Tour Legend, Champion and Tour Champion.

Players advance from one tier to the next based on their current scoring average and number of rounds played at their current tier. Players are challenged at each successive tier by facing standard playing conditions featuring longer tees and/or faster greens. Players can only rise; players cannot retreat from that tier to a lower one even if the average score rises. Certain tournaments on the site are open only to players in certain tiers, and in some competitions between players of different tiers the players play from different sets of tees depending on each player's tier.

According to player research on the site, as of October 2011 there were over 1,900 WGT Golf players who had advanced to the Legend tier.

Apart from tiers, players are also assigned to "levels" which chiefly reflect the amount of play rather than the player's skill. Players "level up" by earning "experience points," which are based on playing games in certain formats, playing on consecutive days, winning awards and so on. The number of experience points required to rise to the next level increases dramatically as higher levels are reached. Levels are important to players because certain virtual golf equipment may be purchased by players only when they reach a certain level, with the equipment available to higher-level players generally being of higher quality (e.g. clubs that hit the ball farther and more accurately).

=== Golf courses developed for play at WGT Golf ===
==== Stroke play (full 18 holes) ====
===== United States =====
- Bandon Dunes Golf Resort, Coos County (near Bandon), Oregon
- Bethpage Black Course; Old Bethpage, Melville and East Farmingdale; New York
- Chambers Bay, University Place, Washington
- Congressional Country Club (Blue Course), Potomac, Maryland
- Erin Hills, Erin, Wisconsin
- Kiawah Island Golf Resort (Ocean Course), Kiawah Island, South Carolina
- Merion Golf Club (East Course), Haverford and Ardmore, Pennsylvania
- Oakmont Country Club, Plum, Pennsylvania
- The Olympic Club (Lake Course), San Francisco and San Mateo County, California
- Pebble Beach Golf Links, Pebble Beach and Carmel-by-the-Sea, California
- Pinehurst Resort (No. 2 Course), Pinehurst, North Carolina
- Quail Hollow Club, Charlotte, North Carolina
- Wolf Creek Golf Club, Mesquite, Nevada
- Torrey Pines, La Jolla, California

===== United Kingdom =====
- Old Course at St Andrews, St Andrews, Scotland
- Royal St George's Golf Club, Sandwich, England

===== Canada =====
- Fairmont Chateau Whistler Golf Club, Whistler, British Columbia

===== Mexico =====
- The Ocean Course at Cabo del Sol, Los Cabos Municipality (near Cabo San Lucas), Baja California Sur

==== Closest-to-the-hole challenges (9 holes, or in some cases two different sets of 9 holes each) ====
===== United States =====
- Bali Hai Golf Club, Paradise and Enterprise, Nevada
- Edgewood Tahoe Golf Course, Stateline, Nevada/South Lake Tahoe, California
- Harbour Town Golf Links, Hilton Head Island, South Carolina
- Koele Golf Course, Lanai City, Hawaii
- Manele Golf Course, Manele, Hawaii
- Pinehurst Resort (No. 8 Course), Pinehurst, North Carolina
- Valhalla Golf Club, Louisville, Kentucky

===== United Kingdom =====
- Celtic Manor Resort (Twenty Ten Course), Newport, Wales

===== Netherlands =====
- Hilversumsche Golf Club, Hilversum, North Holland/De Bilt, Utrecht

Closest-to-the-hole challenges can also be played on each of the courses that are available for full stroke play.

=== Future courses ===
In line with its USGA tie-in, World Golf Tour has published a preview of the new courses that will be launched on the site in conjunction with the upcoming locations for the U.S. Open: Winged Foot (2020).

In WGT's tie-in with The R&A for The Open Championship, it may release further courses in the rota in future years, but so far no long-range commitment between World Golf Tour and The R&A has been announced.

== Criticism and Cheating ==
There has always been criticism from some of WGT's player base, a portion of which is aimed at World Golf Tour's business model and the 'jumpy meter'. The meter, a moving bar used to give the desired direction to the shot, is often 'jumpy' (as non-fluid) and results in a disruption of the gaming experience. WGT features microtransactions for better equipment, which, while alleviating some of the game's difficulty, can cost up to US$55.00 for a single club, up to US$48.95 for a set of irons, or the equivalent amount for a full-price title of up to US$99.95 for an entire set of clubs. Prices for a sleeve of 3 golf balls range from the free WGT balls, all the way up to US$16.75 for the most expensive sleeve of 3 balls, which can easily exceed the cost of real golf balls or become just as expensive for players who do not play the game modes in which they can earn the required currencies (status: July 2024). However, no real money is needed to play the game, as everything required can be earned in-game in a variety of ways, including the most expensive club of all, a putter, which is "available as a Country Club Reward to a player on the winning club in a Country Club Event", but is also purchasable for US$4,000, making the game in parts as elite as real golf has the reputation to be for players willing to spend the money required to upgrade their equipment, which sooner or later players may feel compelled to do as they progress through the tiers in order to become or remain competitive.

Another concern has been 'sandbagging," an ongoing issue of skilled players artificially lowering their average score. This practice is used to compete in tournament brackets far below the skill level of the "sandbagger", thus giving them a better chance to place high and win in-game credits at the expense of the other players.

Quitting the game before completion has been a concern since the early years of WGT. It typically occurs when a player is performing poorly and decides to abandon the game, so as to preserve their average score. Players have repeatedly called for WGT to reduce a person's score when they habitually quit as a deterrent to this behavior. In an attempt to remedy these concerns a 'reputation indicator' was introduced, showing players the percentage of finished games of others before the round is started. The advent of challenge games, which require an amount of non-redeemable credits to be put upfront, and which are lost if the player leaves, has also discouraged quitting. Nonetheless, some in the community still call for some sort of punishment to a quitter's score, despite the fact that quitting forfeits a match for the offender and has no negative impact on the score of other players.

The Flash Player version of WGT Golf allowed players to save replays of up to ten of their shots and post them on their profile page. After Adobe's Flash Player came to an end, the replacement app no longer provided the ability to save a replay, and they could not be shared on player profiles. Previous saved replays were removed from the website, along with the "Top Golf Highlight Replays" list.

== Partners and the World Wide Web ==
World Golf Tour enters into license agreements with real golf courses and tournament owners such as the United States Golf Association (USGA) and The R&A. WGT has also made agreements with equipment and apparel providers, including Adams, Ben Hogan, Bridgestone, Callaway, Cleveland, Cobra, Loudmouth, Lynx, Malbon, Maui Jim, Mizuno, Odyssey, PING, Puma, PXG, SeeMore, Snake Eyes, Srixon, TaylorMade, Titleist, TravisMathew, Vice, Volvik, and William Murray.

The United States Golf Association (USGA) partnered with World Golf Tour in 2009 to co-host the first annual Virtual USGA Championship online. The Virtual U.S. Open attracted hundreds of thousands of players from more than 180 countries, and by its third year, over 2 million qualifying rounds were played. The event was won by Wayne Stopak (aka NASAgolfer), with a final round 66 on Bethpage Black. Stopak received a replica of the US Open trophy and a trip for two to Pebble Beach for the 2010 US Open. A similar competition was held in 2010, using the Oakmont course that hosted the Women's Open. One of WGT Golf's dominant players, BolloxInBruges, won a trip to the 2011 US Open, at Congressional. He shot rounds of 61–63. The 2011 Virtual U.S. Open at Congressional, May–June 2011, was won by mrenn29 with final-round scores of 64 and 57. The 2012 Virtual U.S. Open at The Olympic Club was won by StoneColdKiller, winner of the 2011 Virtual Open Championship at Royal St. George's, with record-low rounds of 57–55.

In 2010, the first Virtual Open (British) Championship 2010 was held at St. Andrews. It was won by AvatarLee, with rounds of 58 and 63, for a golfing trip to Scotland. The 2011 Virtual Open Championship at Royal St. George's, in June–July 2011, was won by StoneColdKiller, with rounds of 58 and 61.

External voice chat and streaming programs like Ventrillo, Team Speak, Discord and Twitch can be used to communicate with other players while playing WGT Golf.
