= Puʻupehe Platform =

- Pu'upehe Platform
- U.S. National Register of Historic Places
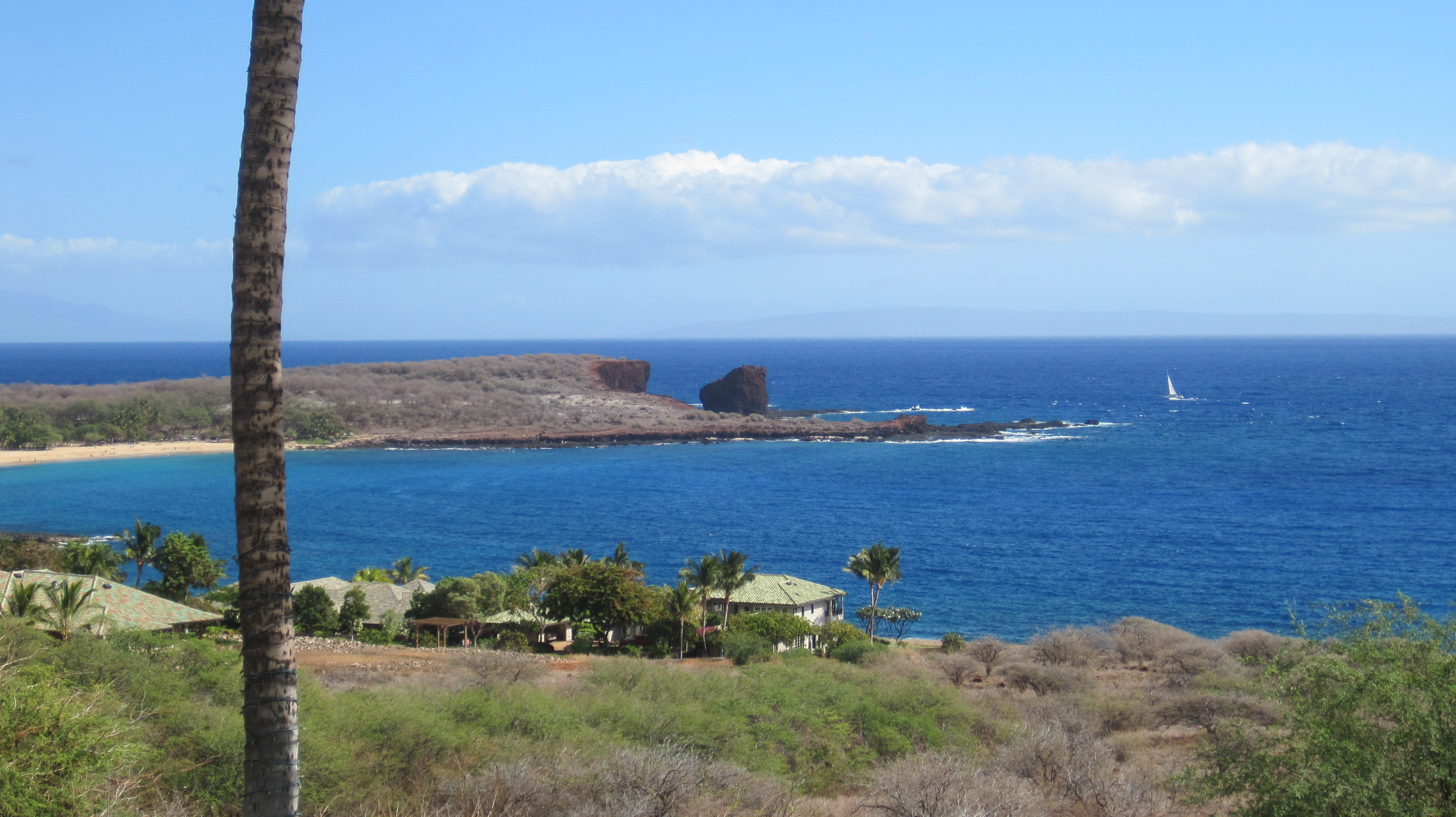
- View from Mānele Bay Resort golf clubhouse

- Location within Hawaii
- Location: Between Mānele Bay and Hulopoʻe Bay, Lānaʻi
- Coordinates: 20°44′04″N 156°53′25″W
- Area: 70 feet (21 m) in diameter
- NRHP reference No.: 86002745
- Added to NRHP: 6 October 1986

Puʻupehe Platform, also known Puʻu Pehe and in tourist literature as Sweetheart Rock, is a triangular sea stack 150 feet off the peninsula separating Mānele Bay and Hulopoʻe Bay on the island of Lānaʻi, Hawaiʻi.

Both its Hawaiian and its English name allude to a legend about Pehe, the beautiful daughter of a local chief, whose jealous husband, Makakehau ('Misty Eyes' clouded by her beauty), confined her to a nearby cave facing the open ocean. When a storm arose while he was away fetching fresh water for her, high seas flooded the cave and drowned her before he could return to rescue her. In his grief, he is said to have hauled her body to the top of the rock, where he entombed her before leaping to his own death. However, when the archaeologist Kenneth Emory investigated the "tomb" in detail in 1921, he found no human bones, only those of sea birds, leading him to conclude that the carefully arranged stones were an altar built by either bird hunters or fishermen.

Since 1976, Puʻu Pehe has marked the boundary between two subzones of the 309-acre Mānele-Hulopoʻe Marine Life Conservation District designated by the State of Hawaii Division of Aquatic Resources. Subzone B includes Mānele Bay boat harbor, while Subzone A includes Hulopoʻe Bay, where no motorized vessels are permitted. Both zones contain clear waters and extensive coral reefs that provide excellent snorkeling and Scuba-diving opportunities.

The land surrounding the two bays contains many remnants of earlier Native Hawaiian village sites, whose inhabitants subsisted on dryland farming and offshore fishing. About 28 acres of former Kapihaʻā village on the rocky shores of Hulopoʻe Bay below the Mānele Bay Resort golf clubhouse have been preserved and marked with interpretative signs along a trail. The remnants of the village include house platforms, garden terracing, stone tool work sites, a heiau, and a fishing shrine (koʻa).

== Gallery ==
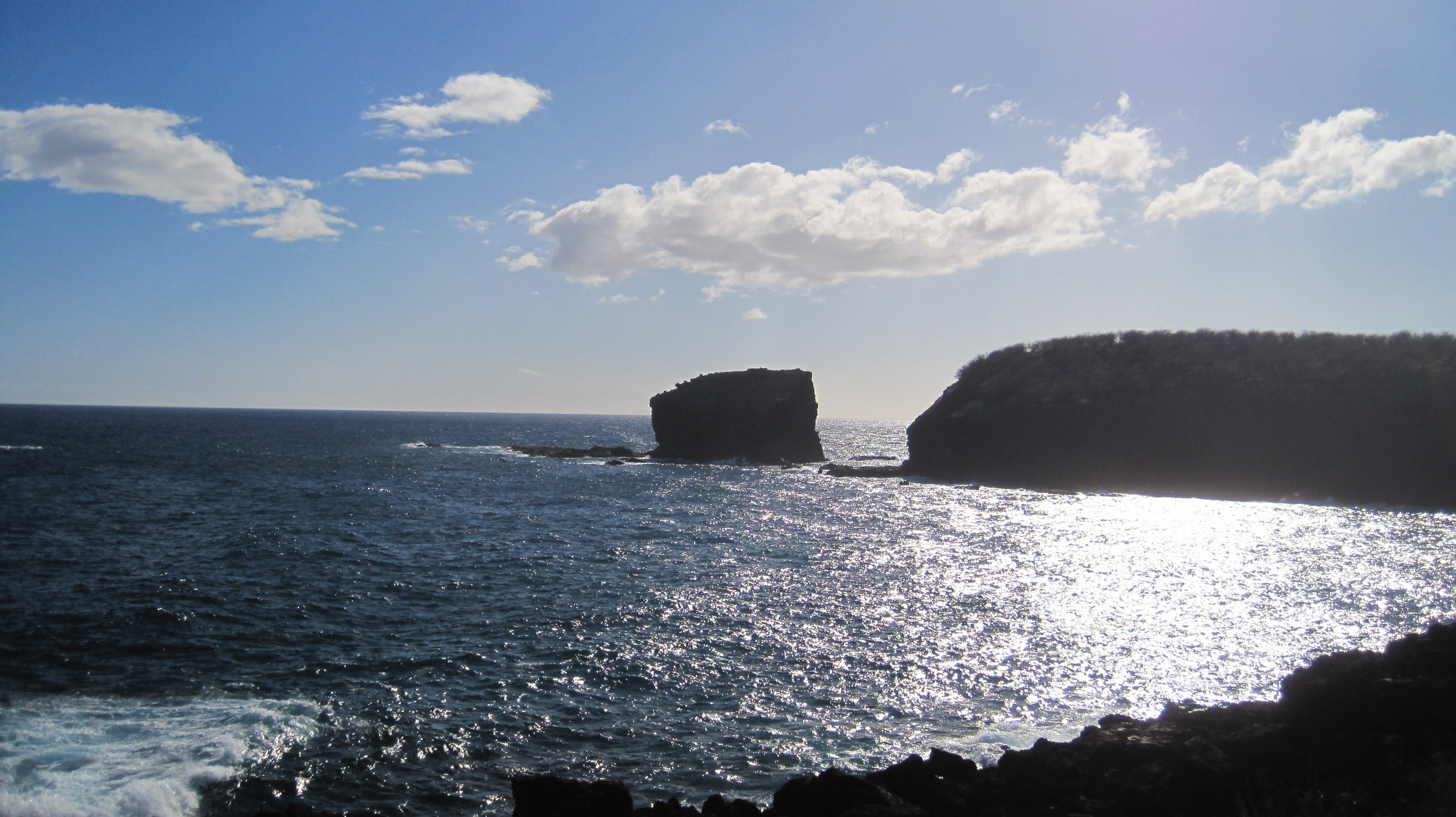
Viewed from Mānele Bay

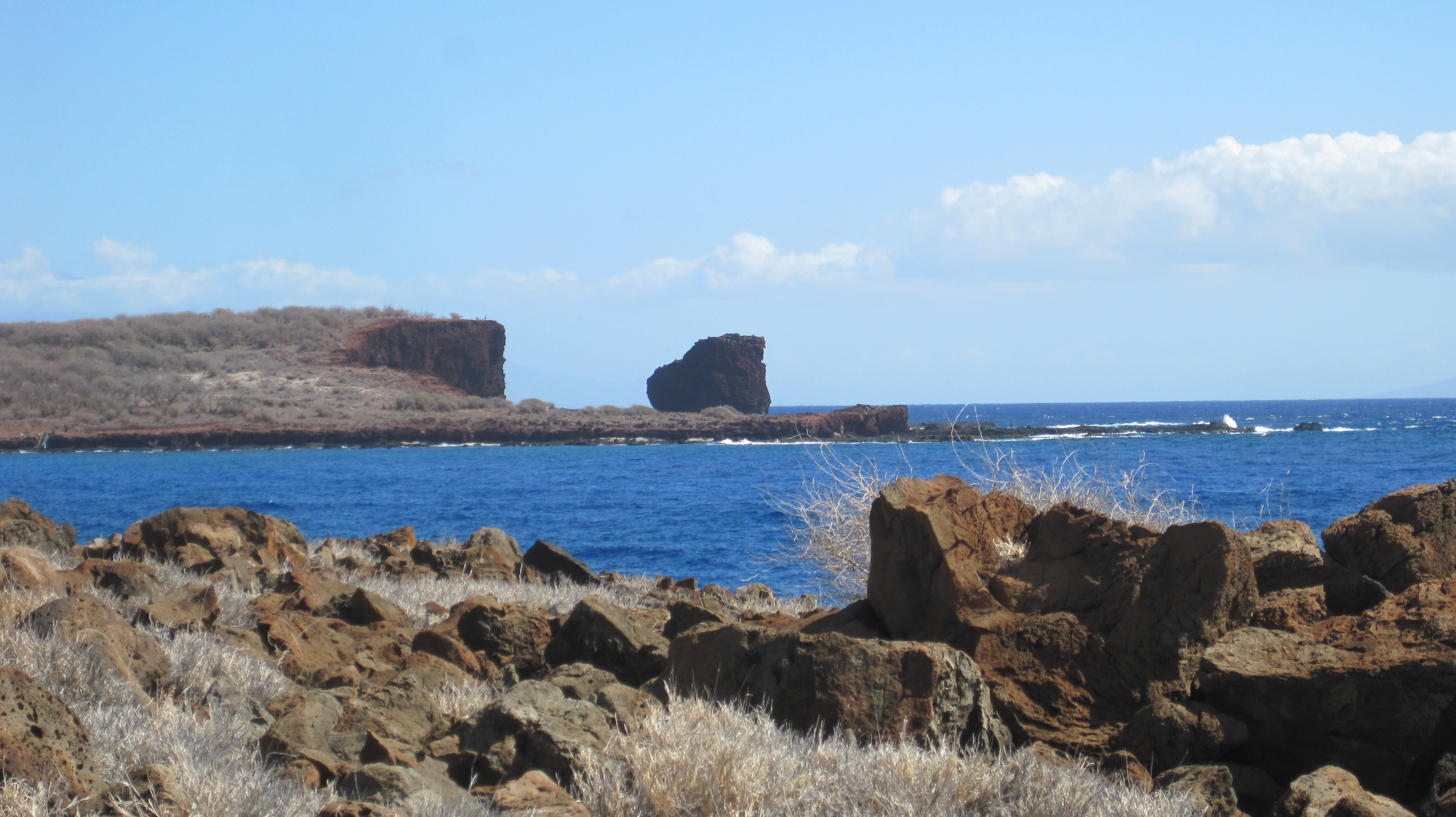
View from shoreline of Kapihaʻā village site across Hulopoʻe Bay

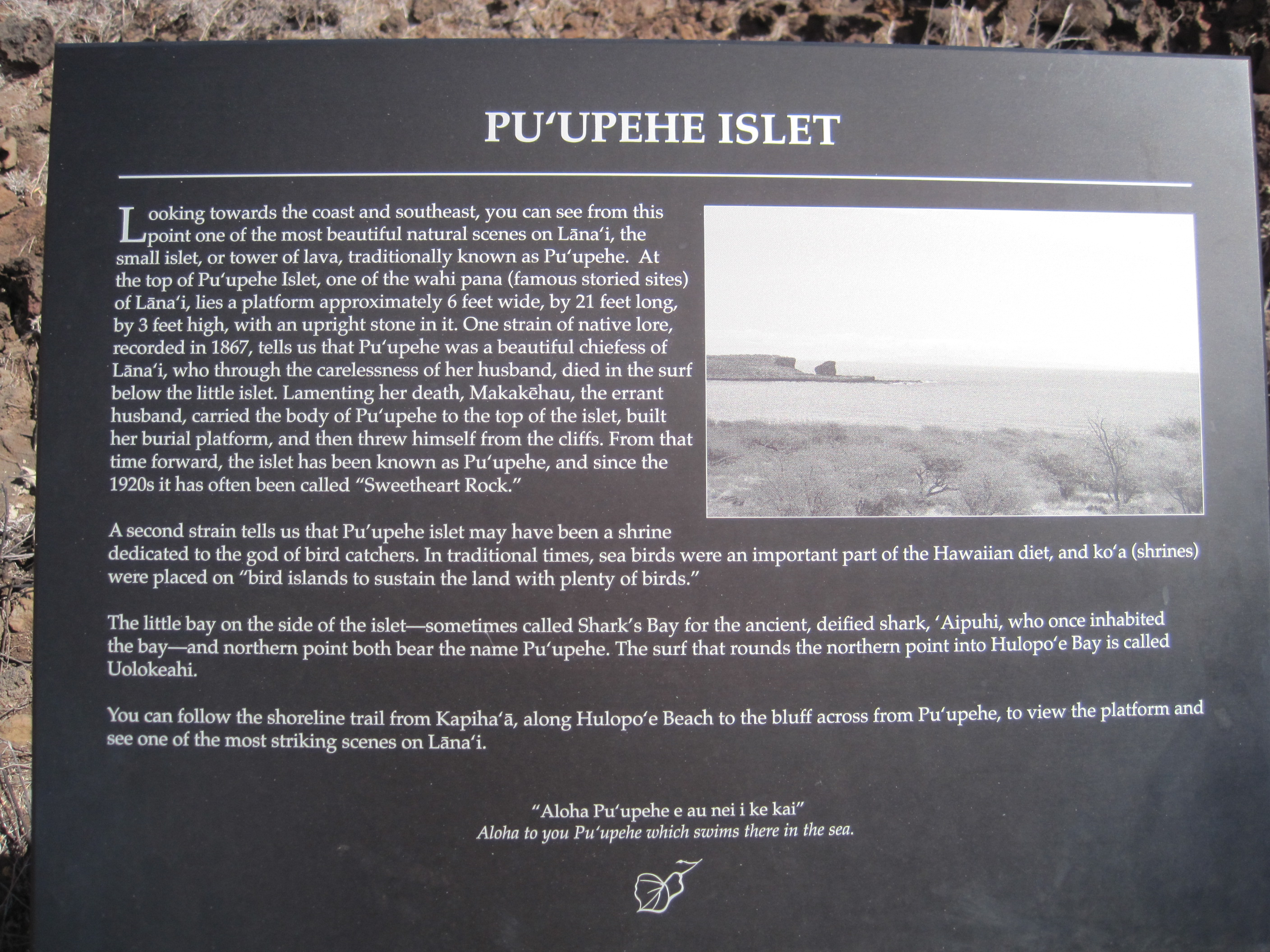
Interpretive sign at Kapihaʻā village site across Hulopoʻe Bay

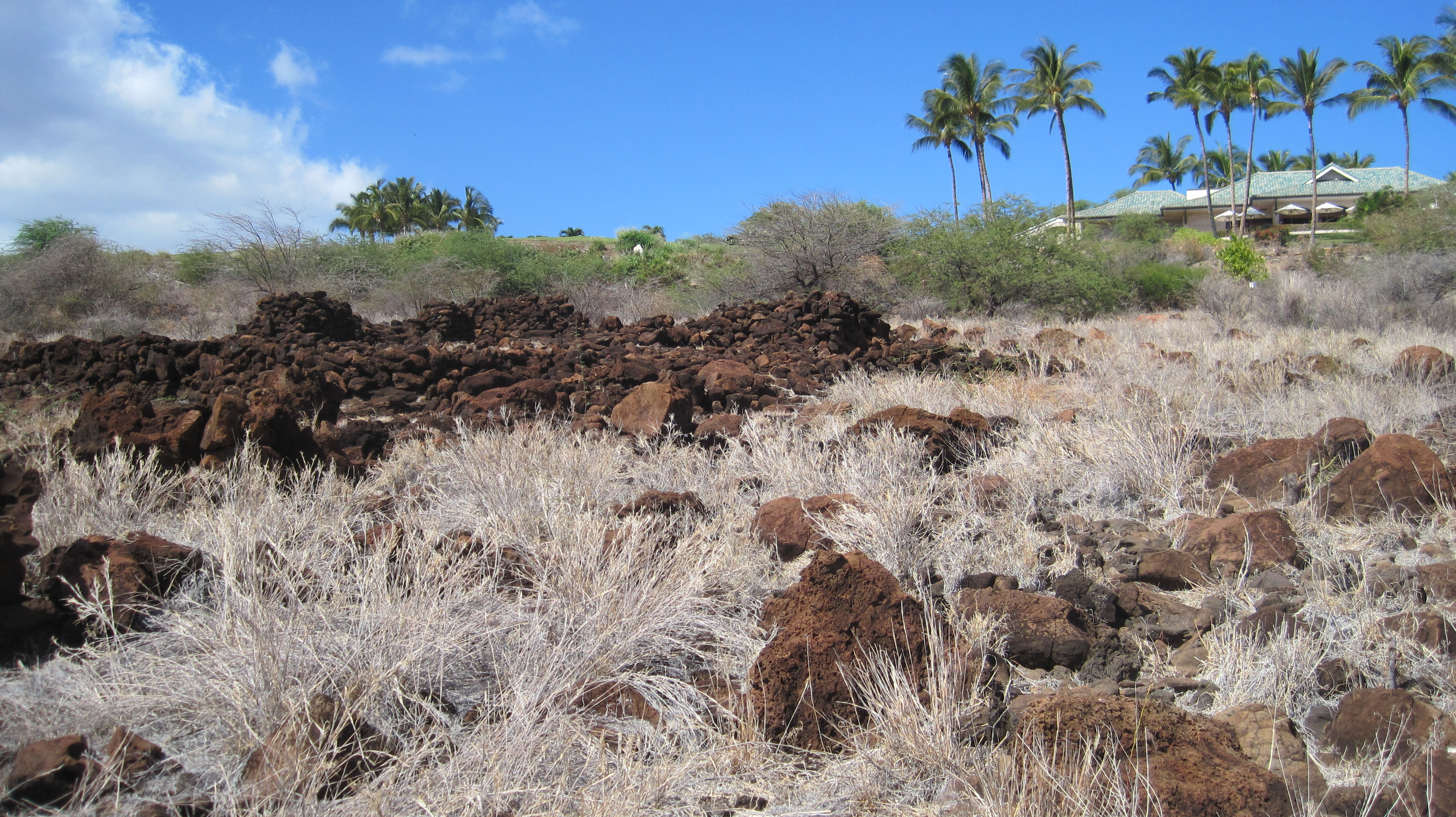
Kapihaʻā village heiau below Mānele Bay golf clubhouse

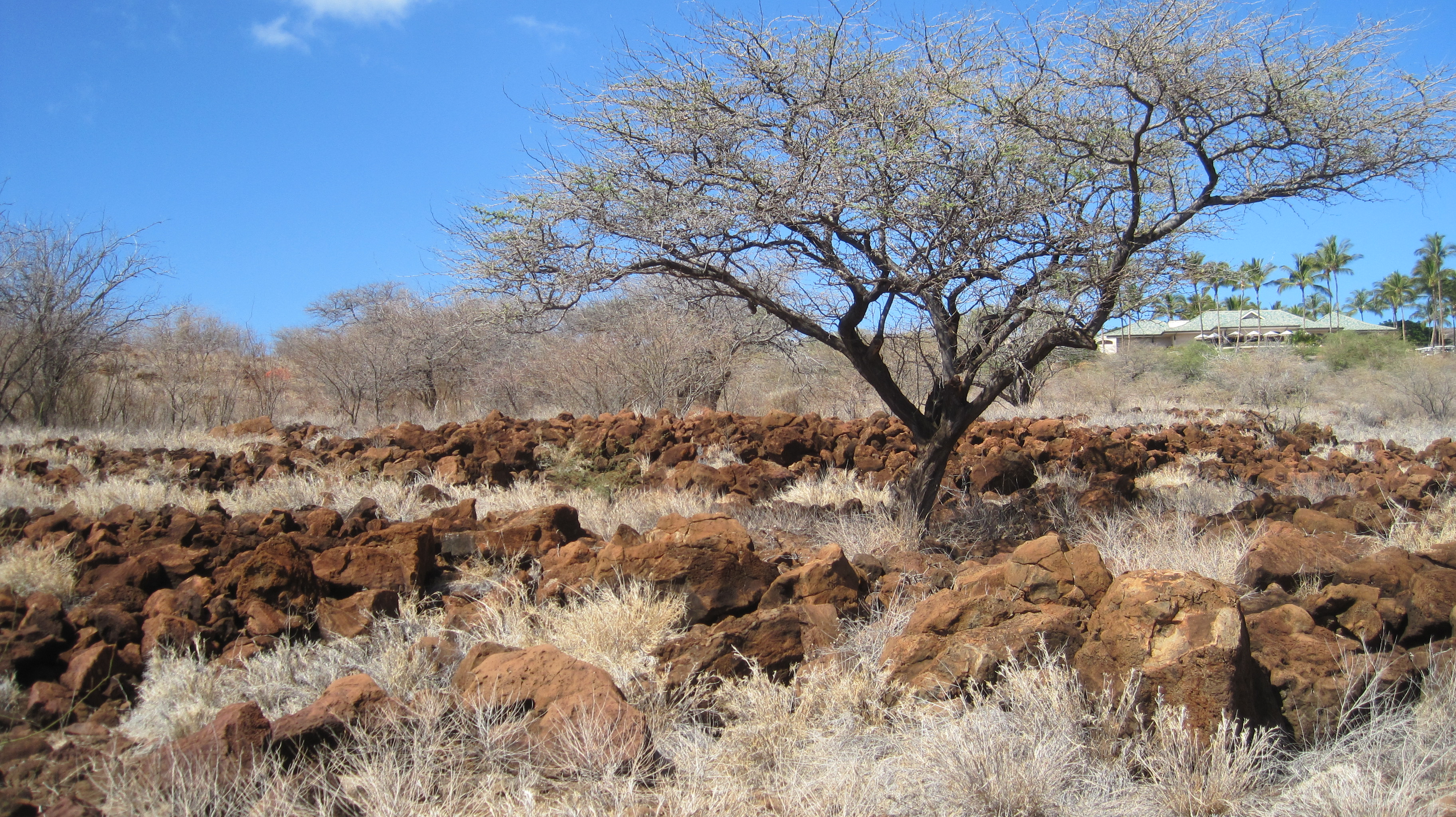
Kapihaʻā village terrace walls below golf clubhouse

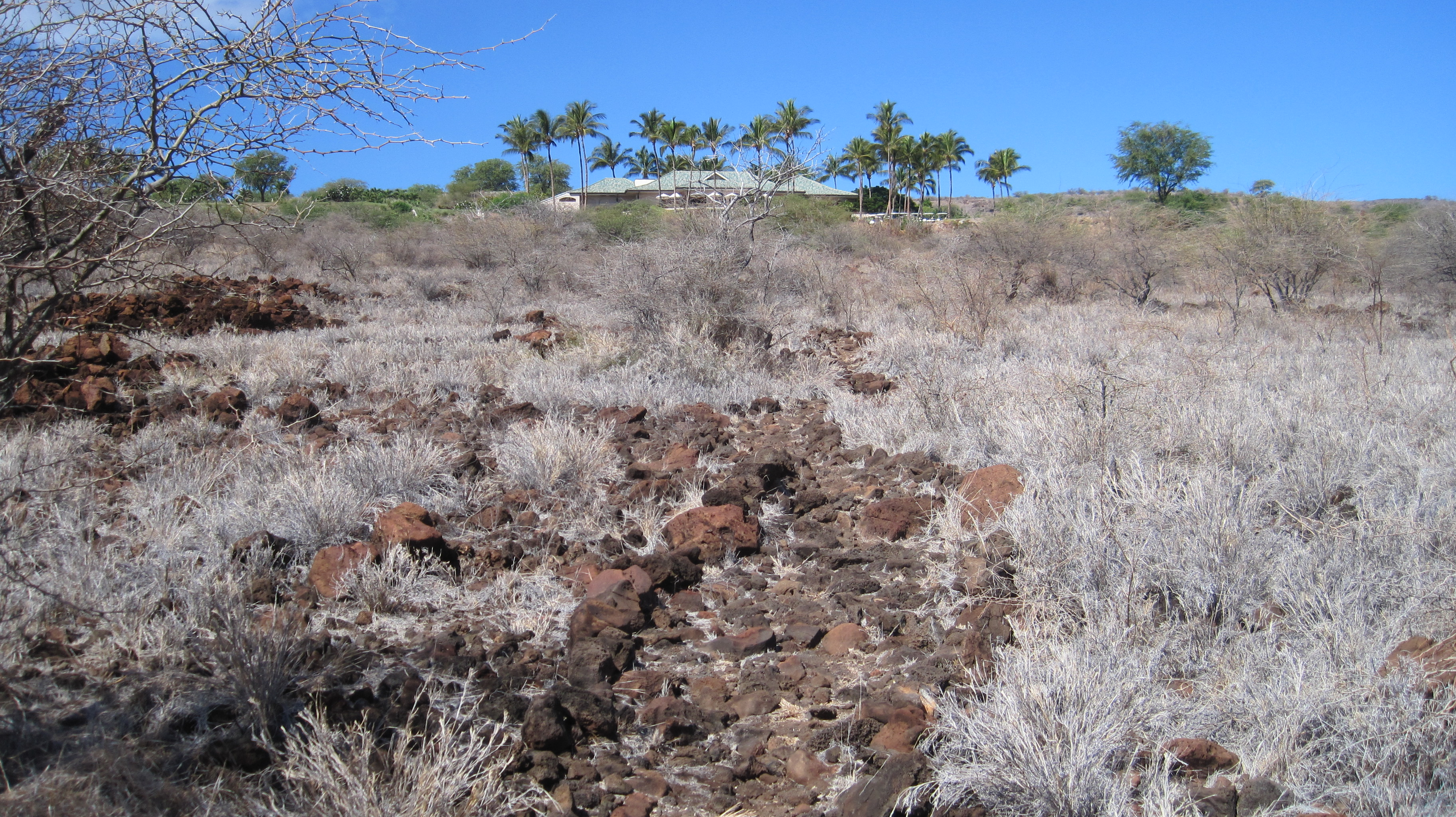
Kapihaʻā village stone path below golf clubhouse
