= Kaunolū Village Site =

- Kaunolu Village Site
- U.S. National Register of Historic Places
- U.S. National Historic Landmark
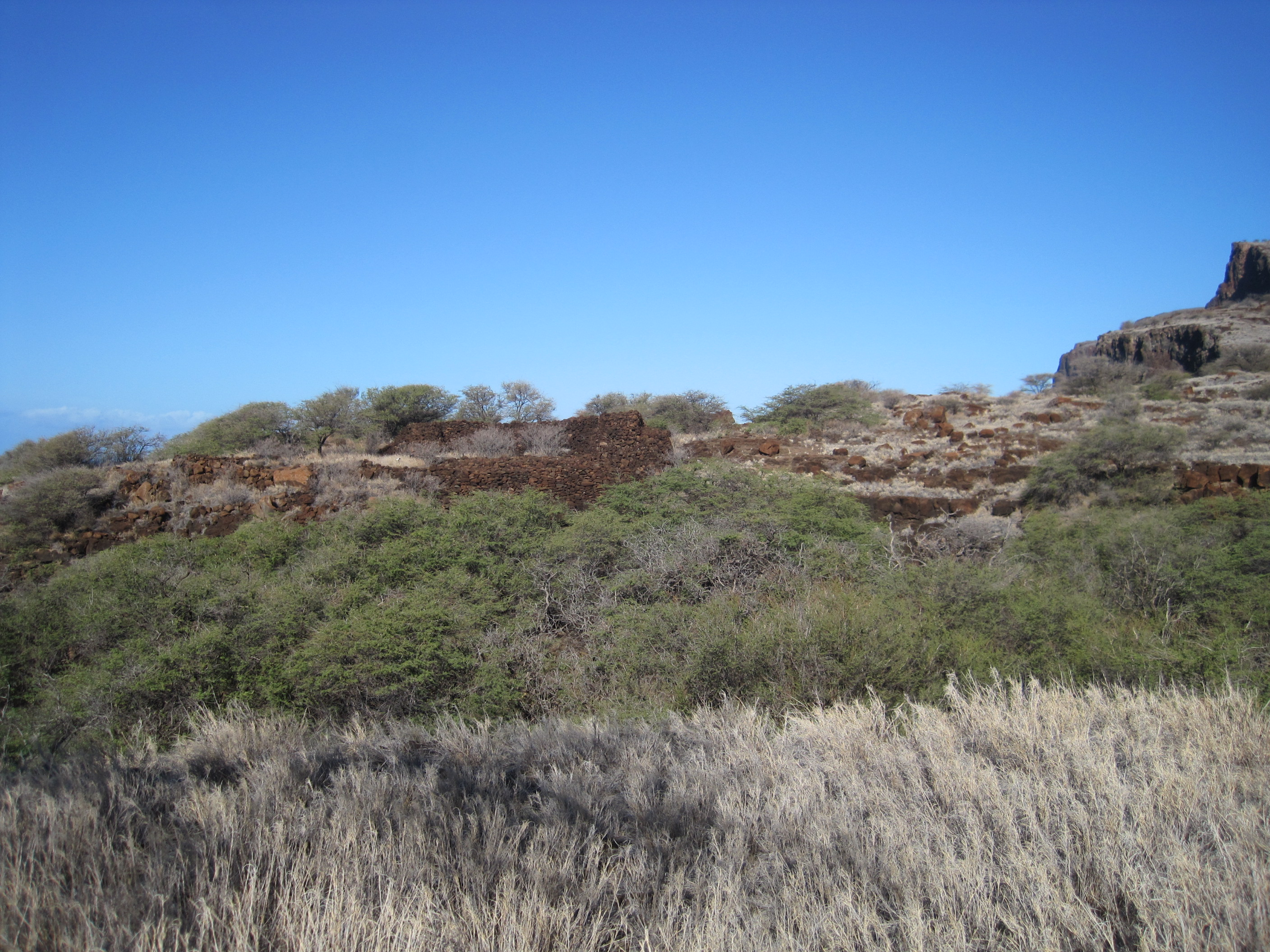
- Halulu Heiau from Kamehameha house site

- Location within Hawaii
- Nearest city: Lāna'i City, Lanaʻi, Hawaii
- Coordinates: 20°44′5″N 156°57′52″W
- Area: 640 acres (260 ha)
- NRHP reference No.: 66000303

Significant dates
- Added to NRHP: October 15, 1966
- Designated NHL: December 29, 1962

Kaunolū Village Site is located on the south coast of the island of Lānaʻi. This former fishing village, abandoned in the 1880s, is the largest surviving ruins of a prehistoric Hawaiian village. The archaeological site is very well preserved and covers almost every phase of Hawaiian culture. It was designated a U.S. National Historic Landmark in 1962 and added to the National Register of Historic Places in 1966.

The site consists of two historical villages straddling Kaunolū Gulch, a dry stream bed subject to occasional flash floods after rainstorms at higher elevations. The village on the western side was named Kaunolū; the one on the eastern side was called Keāliakapu. The land is parched, with little fresh water, but the sheltered bay at the end of the gulch offers access to rich fishing in the deep seas below the high cliffs along the south coast of the island. Ancient Hawaiian bone lures used to troll for pelagic fish were found in Ulaula Cave, a small lava tube near the village.

King Kamehameha I frequently enjoyed fishing here. His house platform lies directly across the gulch from Halulu Heiau, high on the edge of a cliff above the bay. Between 1778 and 1810, he is said to have held ceremonies at this heiau (probably a luakini war/sacrifice heiau). During the late 18th century, Maui high chief Kahekili, a rival of Kamehameha, also used to visit here. Near the heiau is a notch in the cliff called Kahekili's Leap, where he is said to have ordered his warriors to dive into the sea below to prove their courage.

== Gallery ==
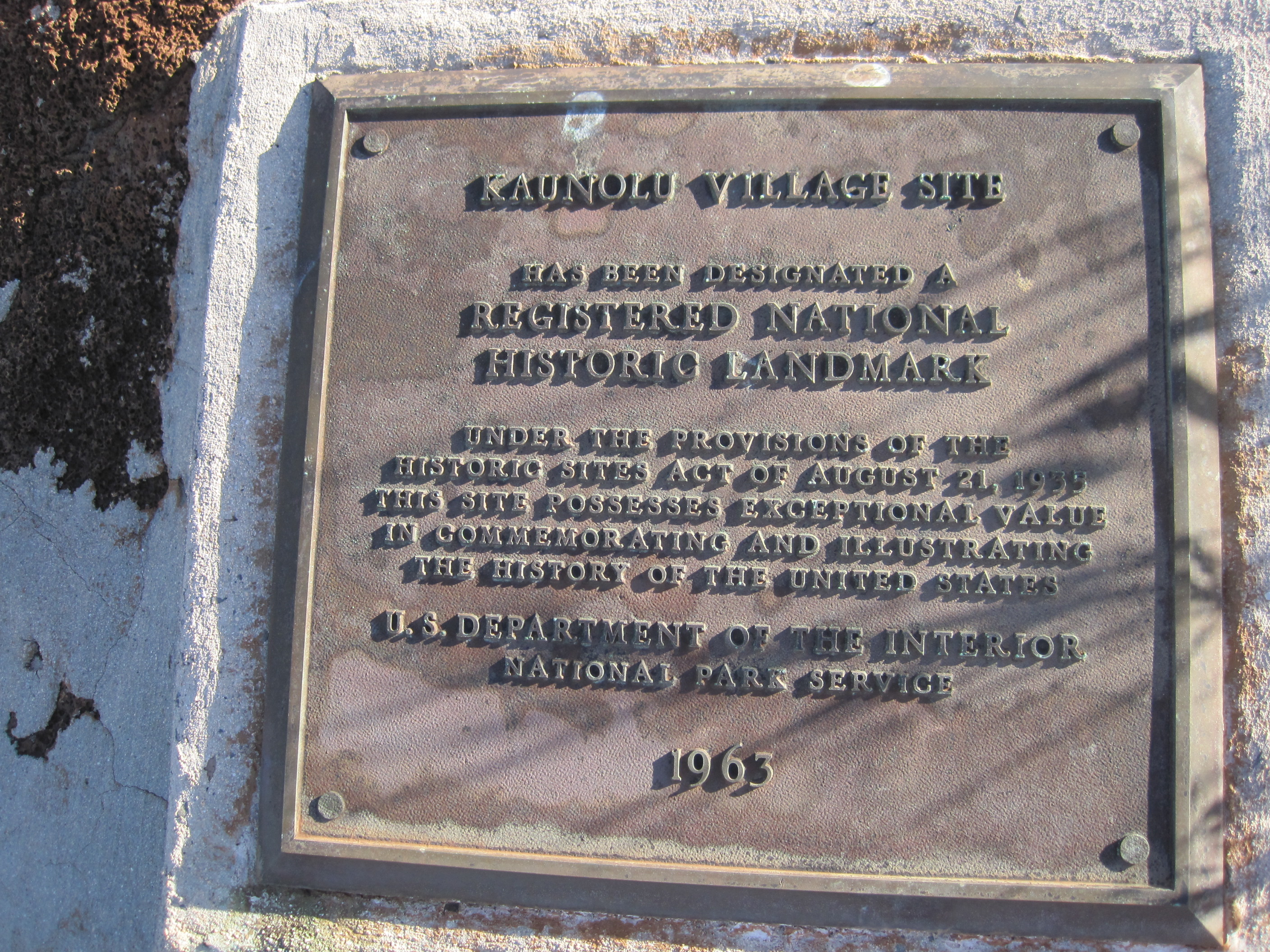
National Historic Landmark plaque

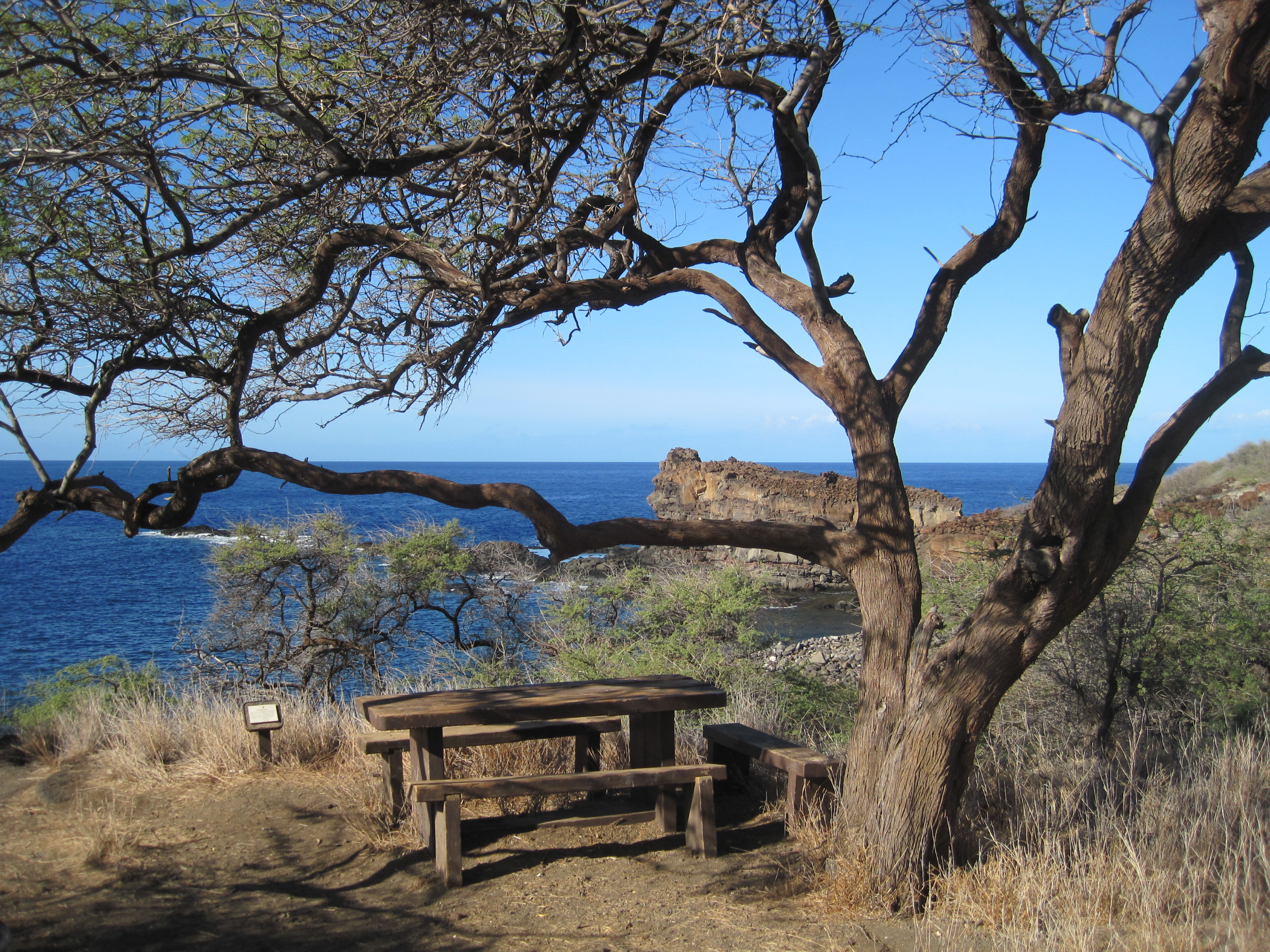
Kamehameha I house site

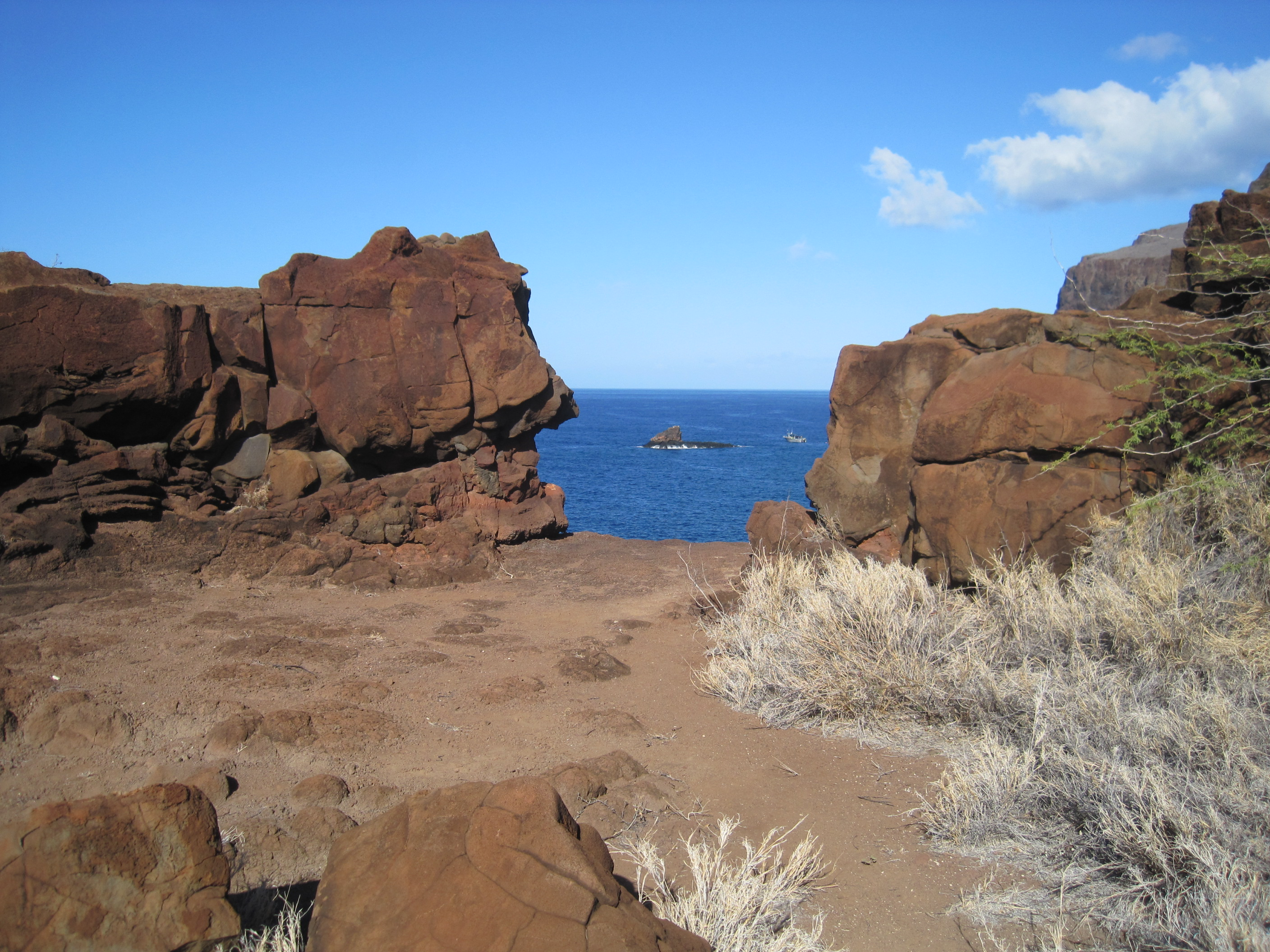
Kahekili's Leap

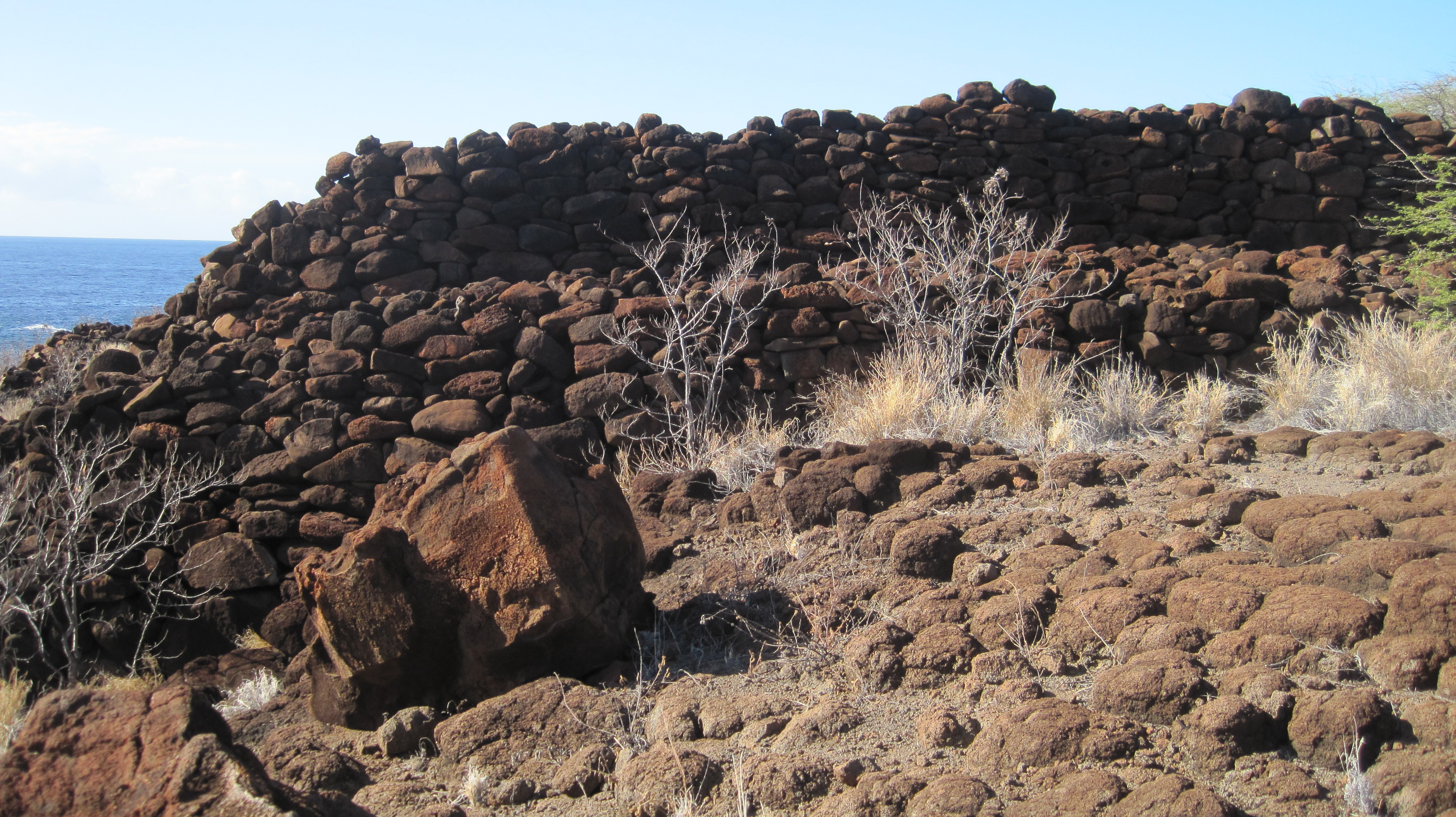
Walls of Halulu Heiau
