= Mānele, Hawaii =

Mānele
- Census-designated place
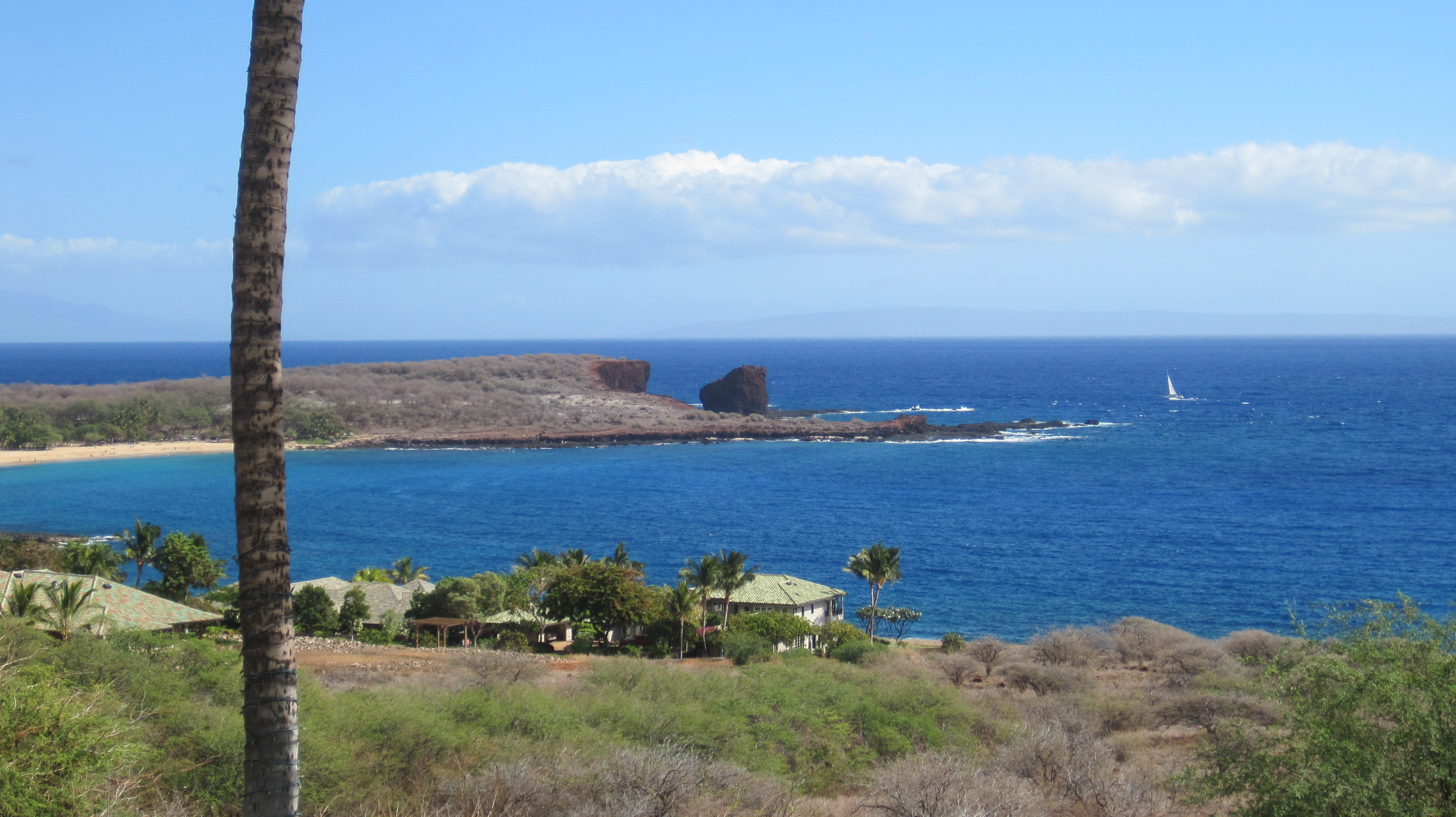
- Four Seasons Resort Lanai and Pu'upehe Platform

- Location within Hawaii
- Coordinates: 20°44′45″N 156°53′25″W
- Country: United States
- State: Hawaii
- Counties: Maui

Area
  - Total: 1.22 sq mi (3.17 km^{2})
  - Land: 1.22 sq mi (3.17 km^{2})
  - Water: 0 sq mi (0.00 km^{2}) 0%

Population (2020)
  - Total: 7
  - Density: 5.7/sq mi (2.2/km^{2})
- Time zone: UTC-10
- ZIP code: 96763
- Area code: 808
- GNIS feature ID: 15-49425

Mānele (Hawaiian for 'sedan chair') is a census-designated place (CDP) in Maui County, Hawaii, United States, on the island of Lanai. As of the 2020 census, the CDP had a population of 7. Mānele is one of only two census-designated places on Lānaʻi, the other being the much larger Lānaʻi City. Mānele is the site of Four Seasons Resort Lanai. It is the least populated legally-recognized place in Hawaii.

== Demographics ==
Historical population
Census	Pop.	Note	%±
2020	7		—
U.S. Decennial Census

The total inhabitants of Manele is 29 as per the census of 2010. A hundred percent of the population goes to or has completed high school. 24 inhabitants are white while 5 are Asian. All of the inhabitants of Manele live above the poverty line.

== Climate ==
The weather in Manele is pleasant. The average chart of temperature for the past fifty years shows that January has the coldest weather with average temperature of 18 degrees Celsius, while July is hottest with an average of 21 degrees. The average rainfall in a year over the last thirty years is 920mm which is 15mm per day.

Chart Reference:

MONTHLY – WEATHER AVG SUMMARY °C	Years on Record	ANNUAL	JAN	FEB	MAR	APR	MAY	JUN	JUL	AUG	SEP	OCT	NOV	DEC
Avg. Temperature	50	20	18	18	18	19	20	21	21	21	21	21	20	19
Avg. High Temperature	50	24	22	22	22	23	23	24	25	25	25	25	24	23
Avg. Low Temperature	50	16	15	15	15	16	16	17	18	18	18	17	16	15
Avg. Precipitation	50	920	130	90	100	70	70	30	40	40	50	50	90	100
Avg. Days Precipitation	15	134	14	14	11	12	11	9	10	10	9	10	10	14

== Crime rate ==
The indices for both violent and property crime are higher in Manele than the averages for the United States. The crime index is 35.5, compared to 31.1 for the United States. The Property Crime index for Manele is 47.3 which is also higher than the average crime index for the United States which is 38.1.

For Crime Scale, 0 means no crime rate while 100 means maximum crime rate.

== Transportation ==
There is an airport available in Lanai City, where there are flights every day from Honolulu to Lanai and vice versa. The Island and Hawaiian air service manage this airport. Chartered planes are also available. There is a taxi service, and hotels on the bay provide shuttle service from and to the airport.
