= WGT (disambiguation) =

WGT is Wave-Gotik-Treffen, a festival in Germany.

WGT may refer to:

== Places ==
- Warner Grand Theatre, Los Angeles, United States
- Wangaratta Airport, Victoria, Australia (IATA:WGT)
- Wigton railway station, England (GBR:WGT)

== Other uses ==
- West Greenland Time, a timezone
- World Golf Tour, a computer game
- World's Got Talent, a proposed British television series
