= Kiawah Island Golf Resort =

Resort in South Carolina, U.S.

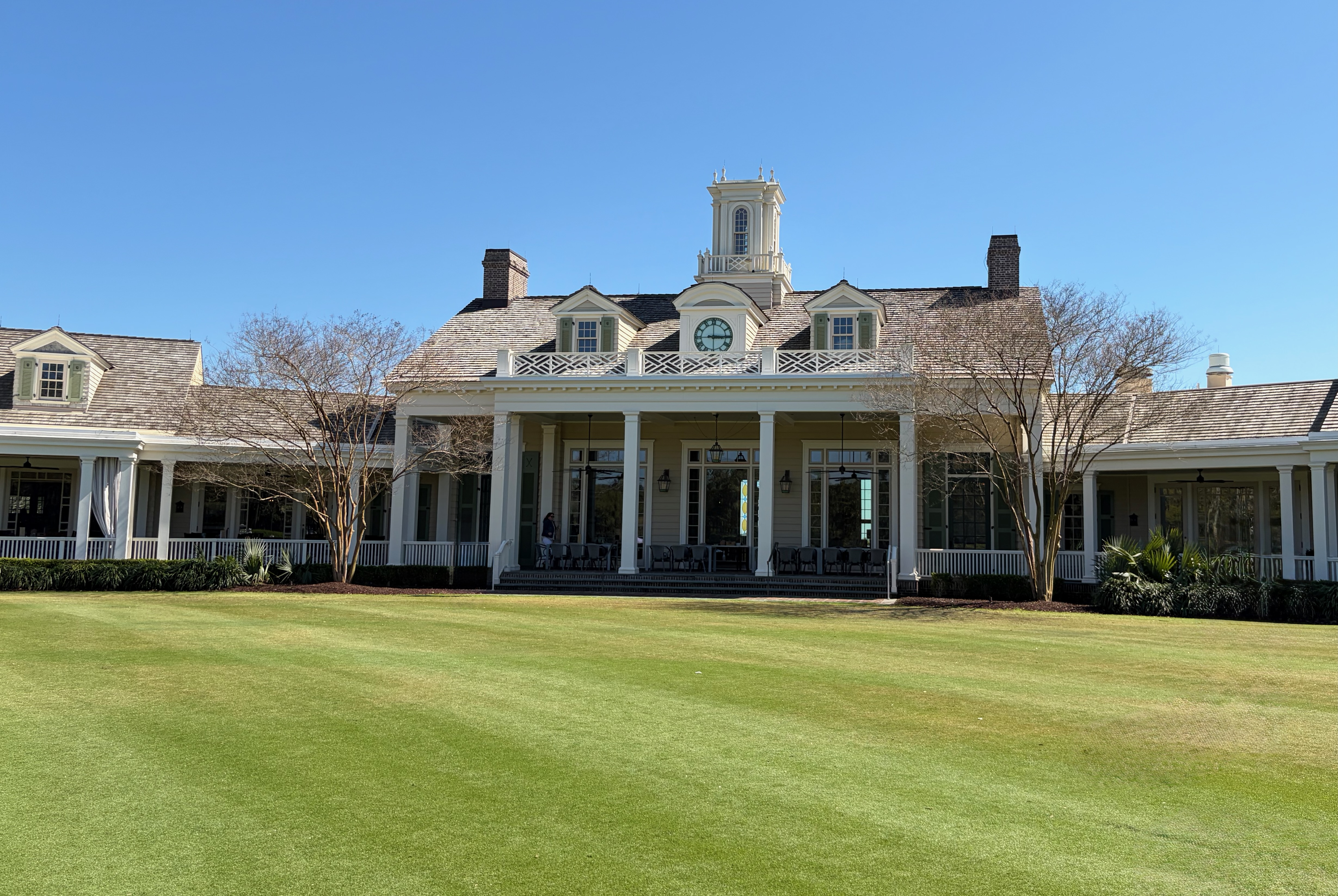
- Cougar Point clubhouse

- Location within the United States Location within South Carolina

Club information
- Location: Kiawah Island, South Carolina, U.S.
- Established: 1974; 52 years ago
- Type: Resort
- Owner: CCA Financial
- Total holes: 90
- Tournaments: Ryder Cup (1991); World Cup (1997, 2003); PGA Professional Championship (2005); Senior PGA Championship (2007); PGA Championship (2012, 2021)
- Website: kiawahresort.com

Ocean Course
- Designed by: Pete Dye & Alice Dye
- Par: 72
- Length: 7,876 yards (7,202 m)
- Course rating: 79.1
- Slope rating: 155

Turtle Point
- Designed by: Jack Nicklaus
- Par: 72
- Length: 6,911 yards (6,319 m)
- Course rating: 73
- Slope rating: 134

Osprey Point
- Designed by: Tom Fazio
- Par: 72
- Length: 6,902 yards (6,311 m)
- Course rating: 72.8
- Slope rating: 135

Oak Point
- Designed by: Clyde Johnston
- Par: 72
- Length: 6,701 yards (6,127 m)
- Course rating: 71.9
- Slope rating: 130

Cougar Point
- Designed by: Gary Player redesigned
- Par: 72
- Length: 6,814 yards (6,231 m)
- Course rating: 72.7
- Slope rating: 134

Kiawah Island Golf Resort is a resort on Kiawah Island, South Carolina, located along a ten-mile (16 km) mix of island and beachfront property approximately 30 miles (48 km) southwest of Charleston.

Opened in May 1974, the resort is home to The Sanctuary at Kiawah Island Golf Resort, a Forbes Five-Star/AAA Five-Diamond 255-room hotel and spa.

== Golf ==
Kiawah Island Golf Resort is home to five championship golf courses, most notably The Ocean Course, towards the eastern end of the island, added in 1991. The other four are (from east to west): Osprey Point, Turtle Point, Cougar Point and Oak Point (on Johns Island).

=== The Ocean Course ===
The Ocean Course on Kiawah Island was designed by Pete and Alice Dye. It has been named one of the best courses in the world by several publications, including Golf Digest and Golf Magazine. It is also a "Certified Audubon Cooperative Sanctuary" by Audubon International for its design protecting native bird species. As of 2010, The Ocean Course was rated 25th in Golf Digest's 100 Greatest Golf Courses in America.

The Ocean Course is a par-72 course over 7,876 yards (7,202 m). Because of its large slopes, numerous bunkers, and challenging Bermuda grass, it was named the toughest course in America in 2010 by Golf Digest.

The Ocean Course was featured in the 2000 film The Legend of Bagger Vance. In October 2008, the Ocean Course became the first course to be available to play in the online video game developed by World Golf Tour. Helicopters equipped with cameras and GPS tracking devices were used to photograph and record the entire course to produce a geographically accurate simulation.

The Ocean Course has hosted several major professional golf tournaments. The course hosted the 1991 Ryder Cup matches, dubbed the "War by the Shore". It was also the site of the 2007 Senior PGA Championship, the 2012 PGA Championship and the 2021 PGA Championship. The Ocean Course was the fourth course to host each of the PGA of America's major championships: the Ryder Cup, the Senior PGA Championship and the PGA Championship.

=== Osprey Point ===
This course, designed by Tom Fazio, features water on fifteen of its eighteen holes.

=== Oak Point ===
Located on the site of an old indigo and cotton plantation, this course is characterized by large fairways, challenging greens, and Scottish-style bunkers. The Kiawah River and Haulover Creek come into play on many holes.

=== Turtle Point ===
Jack Nicklaus designed this course, which hosted the 1990 PGA Cup.

=== Cougar Point ===
Cougar Point was originally designed by Gary Player. It was redesigned in 2017 to lengthen the course and add new greens and bunkers.
