= Lānaʻi =

Sixth largest island in Hawaii

Nickname: The Pineapple Isle
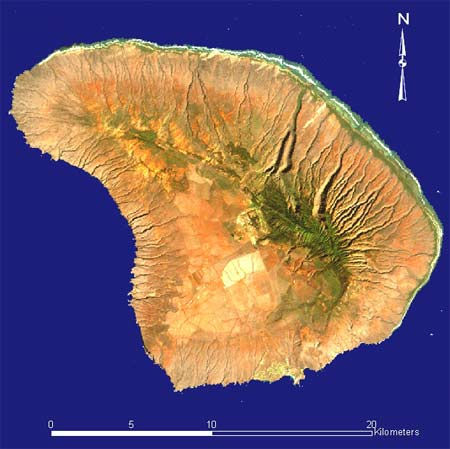
- Landsat satellite image of Lānaʻi

- Location in the state of Hawaii

Geography
- Location: North Pacific Ocean
- Coordinates: 20°49′30″N 156°55′12″W
- Area: 140.5 sq mi (364 km^{2})
- Area rank: 6th largest Hawaiian Island
- Highest elevation: 3,366 ft (1026 m)
- Highest point: Lānaʻihale

Administration
- United States
- State: Hawaiʻi
- County: Maui County
- Owner(s): Larry Ellison 98% State of Hawaii 2%
- Symbols
- Flower: Kaunaʻoa (Cuscuta sandwichiana)
- Color: ʻĀlani (orange)
- Largest settlement: Lānaʻi City

Demographics
- Population: 3,367 (2020)
- Pop. density: 23/sq mi (8.9/km^{2})
- Ethnic groups: Hawaiian

Additional information
- Time zone: Hawaii–Aleutian

Lānaʻi, (Note: /ləˈnaɪ/ lə-NY, also /lɑː-/, /-ˈnɑː.iː/; Hawaiian pronunciation: [laːˈnɐʔi], [naːˈnɐʔi]. (Hawaiian /l/ is often pronounced [n] in words with both /l/ and /n/; see Hawaiian phonology.)) sometimes written Lanai, is the sixth-largest of the Hawaiian Islands and the smallest publicly accessible inhabited island in the chain. It is colloquially known as the Pineapple Island because of its past as an island-wide pineapple plantation. The island's only settlement of note is the small town of Lānaʻi City. The island is 98% owned by Larry Ellison, cofounder and chairman of Oracle Corporation; the remaining 2% is owned by the state of Hawaii or individual homeowners.

Lānaʻi has a land area of 140.5 square miles (364 km^{2}), making it the 43rd largest island in the United States. It is separated from the island of Molokaʻi by the Kalohi Channel to the north, and from Maui by the Auʻau Channel to the east. The United States Census Bureau defines Lānaʻi as Census Tract 316 of Maui County. Its population rose to 3,367 as of the 2020 United States census, from 3,193 as of the 2000 census and 3,131 as of the 2010 census. As visible via satellite imagery, many of the island's landmarks are accessible only by dirt roads that require a four-wheel drive vehicle.

There is one school, Lānaʻi High and Elementary School, serving the entire island from kindergarten through 12th grade. There is also one hospital, Lanai Community Hospital, in Lānaʻi City, with 24 beds, and a community health center providing primary care, dental care, behavioral health care, and selected specialty services. There are no traffic lights.

== History ==
Lānaʻi has been under the control of nearby Maui since before recorded history. Its first inhabitants may have arrived as late as the 15th century.

The Hawaiian-language name Lānaʻi is of uncertain origin, but the island has historically been called Lānaʻi o Kauluāʻau, which can be rendered in English as "day of the conquest of Kauluāʻau". This epithet refers to a legend about a Mauian prince who was banished to Lānaʻi because of his wild pranks at his father's court in Lāhainā. The island was said to be haunted by Akua-ino, ghosts and goblins that Kauluāʻau chased away, bringing peace and order to the island and regaining his father's favor as a consequence.

The first people to migrate there, most likely from Maui and Molokaʻi, probably first established fishing villages along the coast and then spread into the interior, where they raised taro in the fertile volcanic soil. During most of this period, the Mōʻī of Maui controlled Lānaʻi, but generally left its inhabitants alone. The population must have been very low in 1792, because in that year George Vancouver reported that he had ignored the island during his voyage because of its apparent lack of inhabitants or villages. At some point, King Kamehameha I or Kalaniʻōpuʻu-a-Kaiamamao invaded and easily won. Lānaʻi is said to have been Kamehameha's favorite fishing spot among Hawaii's main eight islands.

The history of sugar cultivation in Hawaii begins in Lānaʻi, when in 1802 a farmer from China, Wong Tse Chun, produced a small amount there. He used a crude stone mill he had brought with him to crush the cane.

In 1854, a group of members of the Church of Jesus Christ of Latter-day Saints were granted a lease in the ahupuaʻa of Pālāwai. In 1862, Walter M. Gibson arrived on Lānaʻi to reorganize the settlement. A year later he bought the ahupuaʻa of Pālāwai for $3,000; he used the church's money but titled the land in his name. When church members learned this, they excommunicated him, but he retained ownership of the land. By the 1870s, Gibson, then the leader of the colony on the island, had acquired most of the island's land, which he used for ranching.

By 1890, the population of Lānaʻi had declined to 200. In 1899, Gibson's daughter and son-in-law formed Maunalei Sugar Company, headquartered in Keomuku, on the windward (northeast) coast, downstream from Maunalei Valley. The company failed in 1901. But between 1899 and 1901 nearly 800 laborers, mostly from Japan, had been contracted to work for the plantations. Many Native Hawaiians continued to live along the less arid windward coast, supporting themselves by ranching and fishing.

By 1907, about half the island was owned by cattle rancher Charles Gay. Backed by sugar planter William G. Irwin, Gay worked to acquire the remaining land. The Hawaiian Organic Act made it illegal for the territorial government to sell such a large portion of land to Gay, but a land exchange deal circumvented the law. Gay transferred several acres of land of what is now downtown Honolulu in exchange for the rest of the land on Lānaʻi. The transfer was completed on April 10, 1907, and Gay mortgaged the land that day to Irwin for $200,000. By 1909, Gay had defaulted on the mortgage and officially conveyed the land to Irwin for a rebuttable presumption of consideration of $1. From this comes the myth that the land was bought for a mere $1; the true cost included the $200,000 mortgage (equivalent to $6,911,000 in 2025).

In 1921, Gay planted the first pineapple plant on Lānaʻi. The population had decreased again, to 150—most of whom were the descendants of the island's traditional families. A year later, James Dole, the president of Hawaiian Pineapple Company (later the Dole Food Company), bought the island and developed much of it into the world's largest pineapple plantation.

Upon Hawaii statehood in 1959, Lānaʻi became part of Maui County.

In 1985, Lānaʻi passed into the control of David H. Murdock upon his purchase of Castle & Cooke, then the owner of Dole. High labor and land costs led to a decline in Hawaii pineapple production in the 1980s, and Dole phased out its pineapple operations on Lānaʻi in 1992.

In June 2012, Larry Ellison, then CEO of Oracle Corporation, purchased Castle & Cooke's 98% share of the island for $300 million. The state and individual homeowners own the remaining 2%, which includes the harbor and the homes where the 3,000 inhabitants live. Ellison stated his intention to invest as much as $500 million to improve the island's infrastructure and create an environmentally friendly agricultural industry. He spent an estimated $450 million to remodel his Four Seasons Resort Lanai, which reopened in 2016. He also remodeled his other resort in 2020 and announced plans for further green energy projects by buying out diesel-powered utility assets, but he has since canceled this plan.

Ellison has been described as a contemporary American king on Lāna'i, which was his primary residence from 2020 to 2023. A provision in his rental agreement stipulates that anyone who loses a job with his company may also be evicted from their home, and many people both work for and rent from him; additionally, small enterprises' lease agreements, which could be as high as five-years previously, are now usually thirty days. According to Lānai's representative on the regional Maui County Council, Gabe Johnson, the government has limited authority over public infrastructure.

== Legends ==
According to Hawaiian legends, man-eating spirits have occupied the island. For generations, Maui chiefs believed in these spirits. Differing legends say that either the prophet Lanikāula drove the spirits from the island or the unruly Maui prince Kauluāʻau accomplished that feat. The more popular myth is that the mischievous Kauluāʻau pulled up every breadfruit tree (ʻulu) he could find on Maui. Finally his father, Kakaʻalaneo, banished him to Lānaʻi, expecting him not to survive in that hostile place. But Kauluāʻau outwitted the spirits and drove them from the island. The chief looked across the channel from Maui and saw that his son's fire continued to burn nightly on the shore, and he sent a canoe to Lānaʻi to bring the prince back, redeemed by his courage and cleverness. As a reward, Kakaʻalaneo gave Kauluāʻau control of the island and encouraged emigration from other islands. Kauluāʻau had, in the meantime, pulled up all the breadfruit trees on Lānaʻi, accounting for the historic lack of them on that island.

== Geography ==
The highest point in Lānaʻi is Mount Lānaʻihale. It is an inactive volcano near the center of the island and east of Lānaʻi City. Its elevation is 3,366 ft (1,026 m).

Lānaʻi was traditionally administered in 13 political subdivisions (Ahupuaʻa), grouped into two districts (mokuoloko): kona (Leeward) and koʻolau (Windward). The ahupuaʻa are listed below, in clockwise sequence, and with original area figures in acres, starting in the northwest of the island.

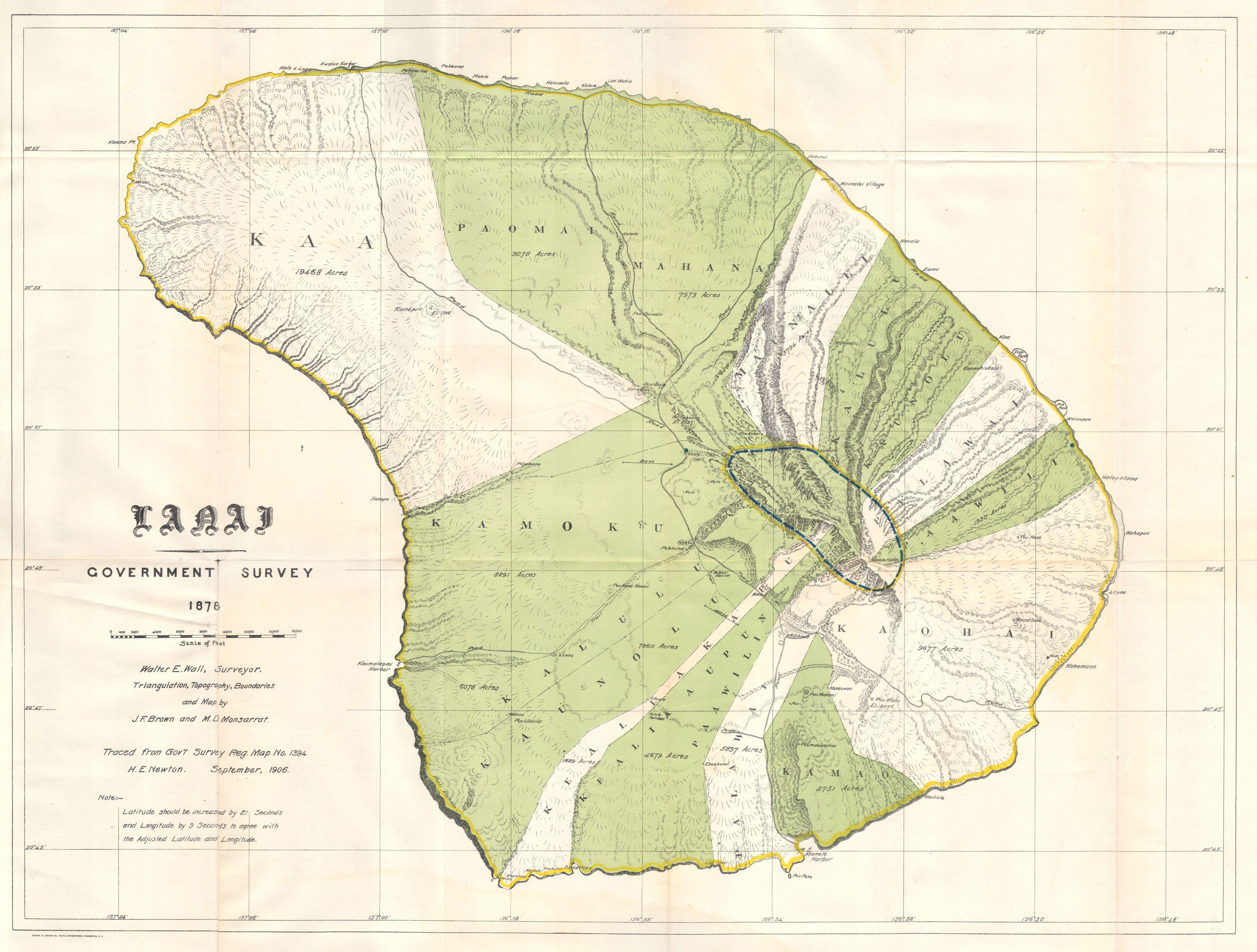
Map of the island in 1878 with traditional subdivision into Ahupuaʻa

Nr.	Ahupuaa	Area acres	Area km^{2}	Population
1	Kaʻā	19468	78.78	207
2	Paomaʻi	9078	36.74	147
3	Mahana	7973	32.27	1
4	Maunalei	3794	15.35	0
5	Kalulu	6078	24.60	1
6	Kaunolū	7860	31.81	3
7	Pālāwai	5897	23.86	1
8	Pāwili	1930	7.81	0
9	Kaʻōhai	9677	39.16	1
10	Kamaʻo	2751	11.13	2
11	Keālia Aupuni	5897	23.86	2
12	Keālia Kapu	1829	7.40	1
13	Kamoku	8291	33.55	2804
	Lānaʻi	90523	366.33	3170

Kamoku has the largest population because it contains most of Lānaʻi City. Parts of Lānaʻi City stretch to Kaʻā and Paomaʻi. As of 2010, the remaining ahupuaʻa were virtually uninhabited. According to the 2020 census, Lānaʻi City accounts for 99% of the island's population (3,332 of 3,367). As a census-designated place, Lānaʻi City is defined solely for statistical purposes, not by administrative boundaries.

A giant wave generated by a submarine landslide on a sea scarp south of Lānaʻi 100,000 years ago generated a megatsunami that inundated land to elevations higher than 300 metres (980 ft).

== Tourism ==
Tourism on Lānaʻi began to be prominent in more recent history as the pineapple and sugarcane industries were phased out in the islands. But the number of visitors to the island is still relatively small, with around 59,000 expected in 2016. Of all the publicly accessible Hawaiian islands, only Molokaʻi attracts fewer visitors.

As of 2016, the two resort hotels on Lānaʻi were managed by Four Seasons Hotels; the Four Seasons Resort Lanai is in Manele Bay at Hulupoe Beach. The Hotel Lanai in Lānaʻi City was built in 1923 by James Dole of the Hawaiian Pineapple Company as a lodge to house the executives overseeing the island's pineapple production. It was the island's only hotel until 1990.

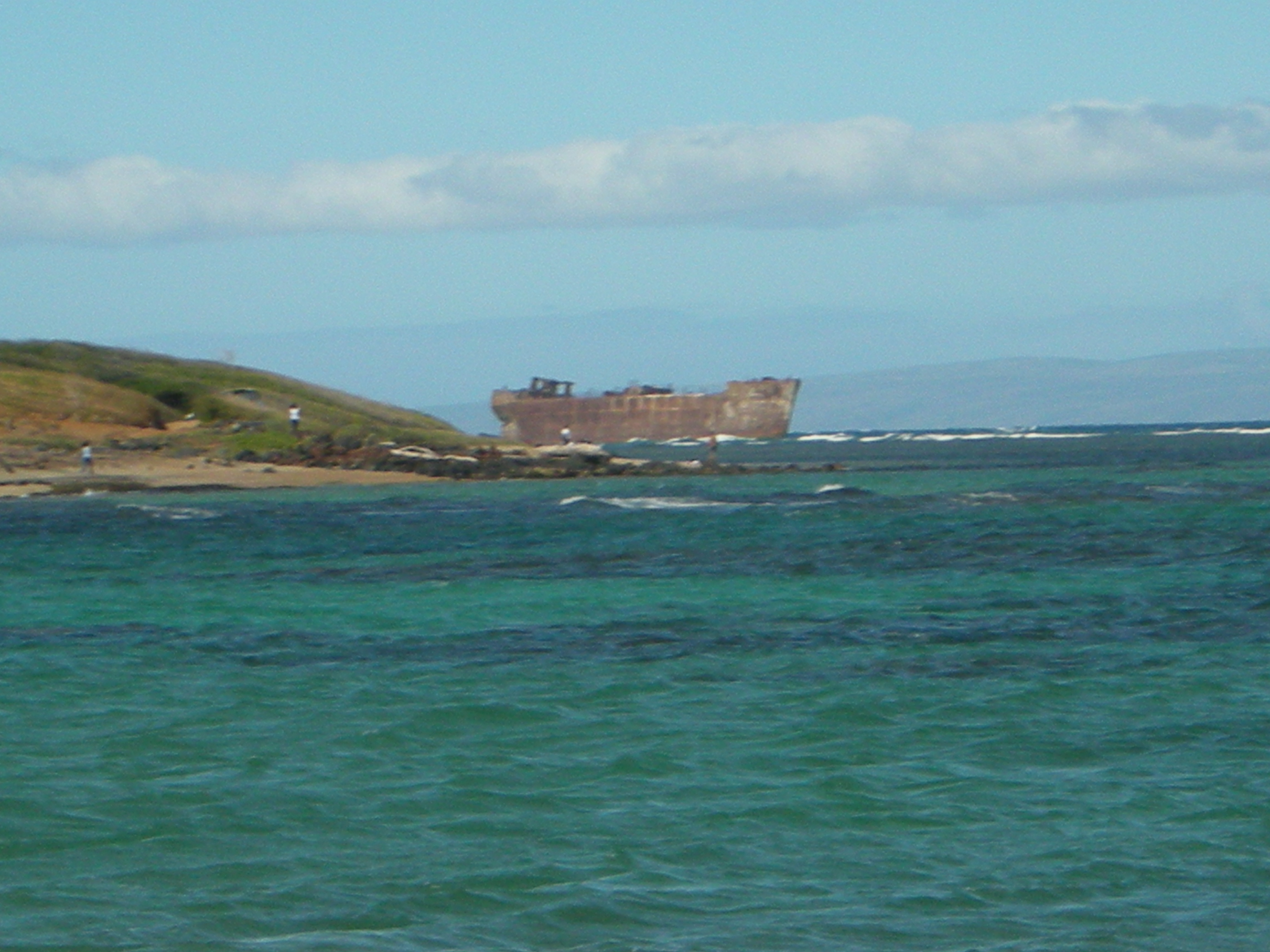
Wrecked YOGN-42 in Shipwreck Beach

Lānaʻi is also presently home to two golf courses, one at the Manele Bay Four Seasons resort and a second, free course.

- The Challenge at Manele borders the ocean and was designed by Jack Nicklaus. Bill Gates married Melinda French on the 12th hole tee-box.
- The Cavendish is a public golf course designed by E. B. Cavendish in 1947. It is a nine-hole course surrounded by Norfolk pines.

Shipwreck Beach, on the island's north shore, is so named because of the remains of a wrecked vessel a short distance offshore. This is popularly called a World War II Liberty Ship, but it is YOG-42, one of several concrete barges built during the war.

== Transportation ==
There are no traffic lights on Lānaʻi. Public transportation is supplied by the hotels. Most attractions outside the hotels and town can be visited only via dirt roads on an off-road vehicle, bicycle, or foot.

Lānaʻi is served by Lanai Airport, which offers air taxi and scheduled commercial operations to other Hawaiian islands.

== Education ==
There is one school district in Hawaii, the Hawaii State Department of Education. The district operates Lanai High and Elementary School.

The Hawaii State Public Library System operates the Lanai Public and School Library.

== Notable people ==
- Danny Lockin, actor, dancer, born in Lānaʻi in 1943. Best known for his role as Barnaby Tucker in the 1969 movie Hello, Dolly!, he played the same role in the Broadway play when it toured the United States.

== Gallery ==
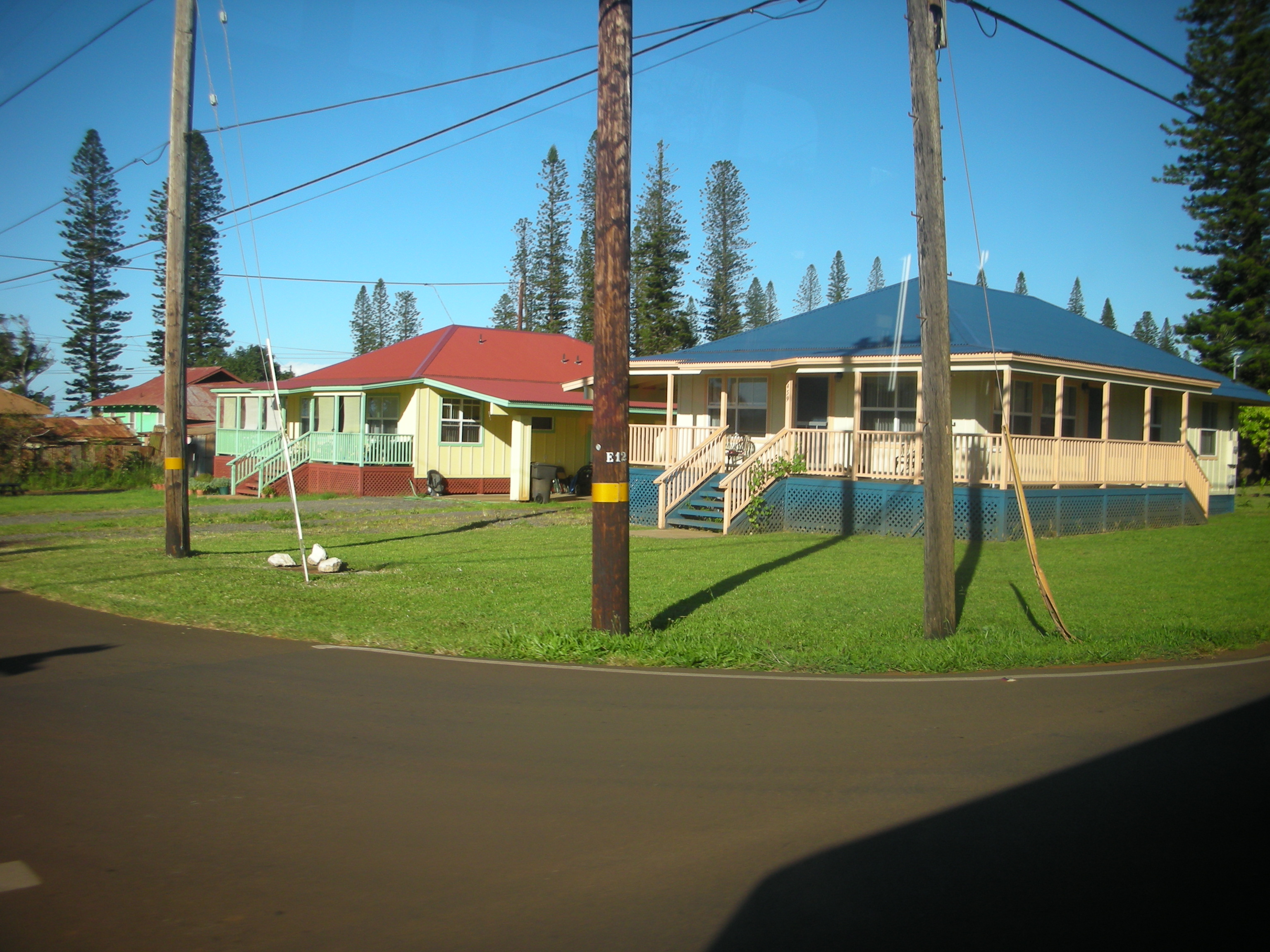
Housing in Lānaʻi City

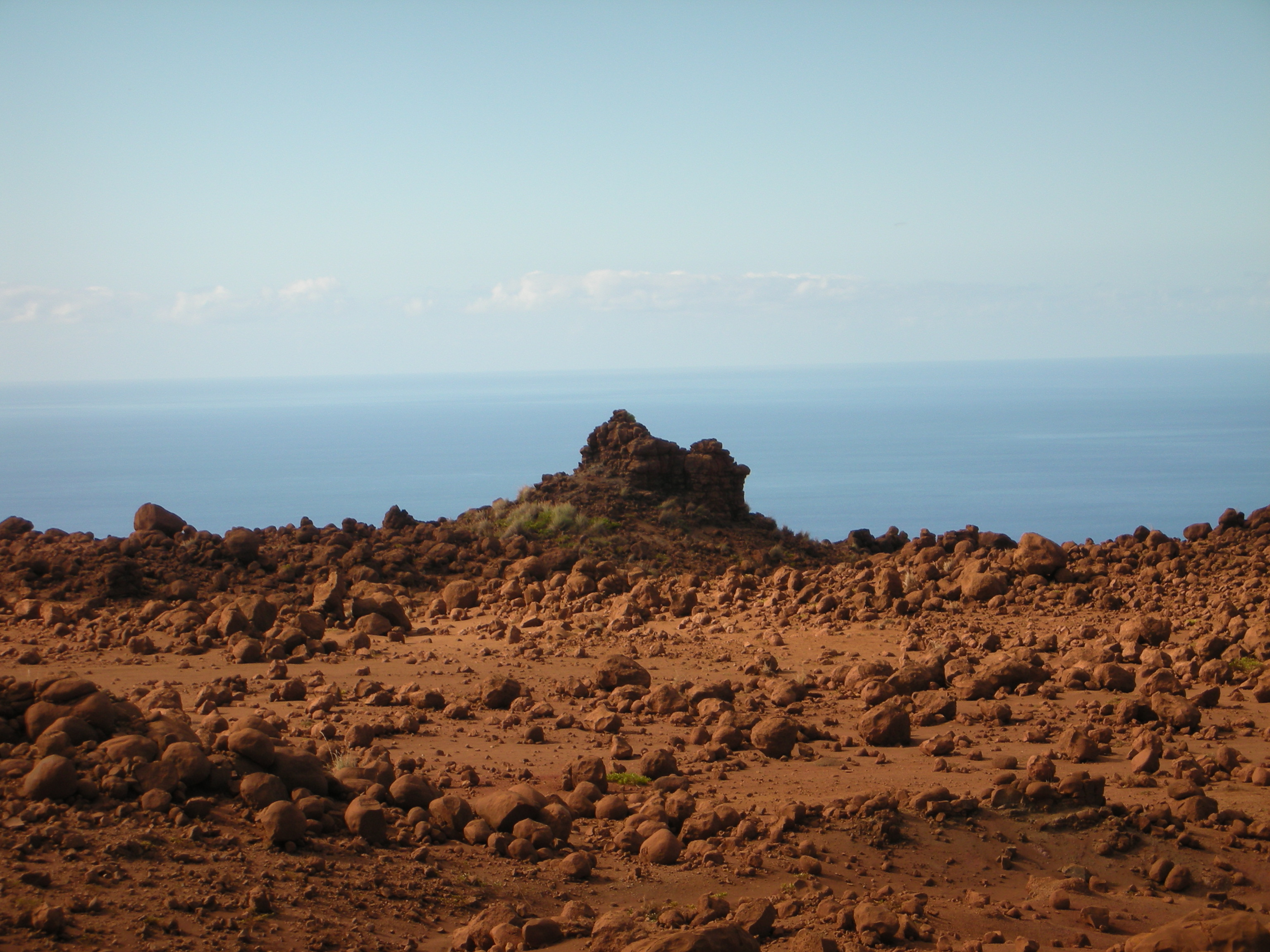
Keahiakawelo

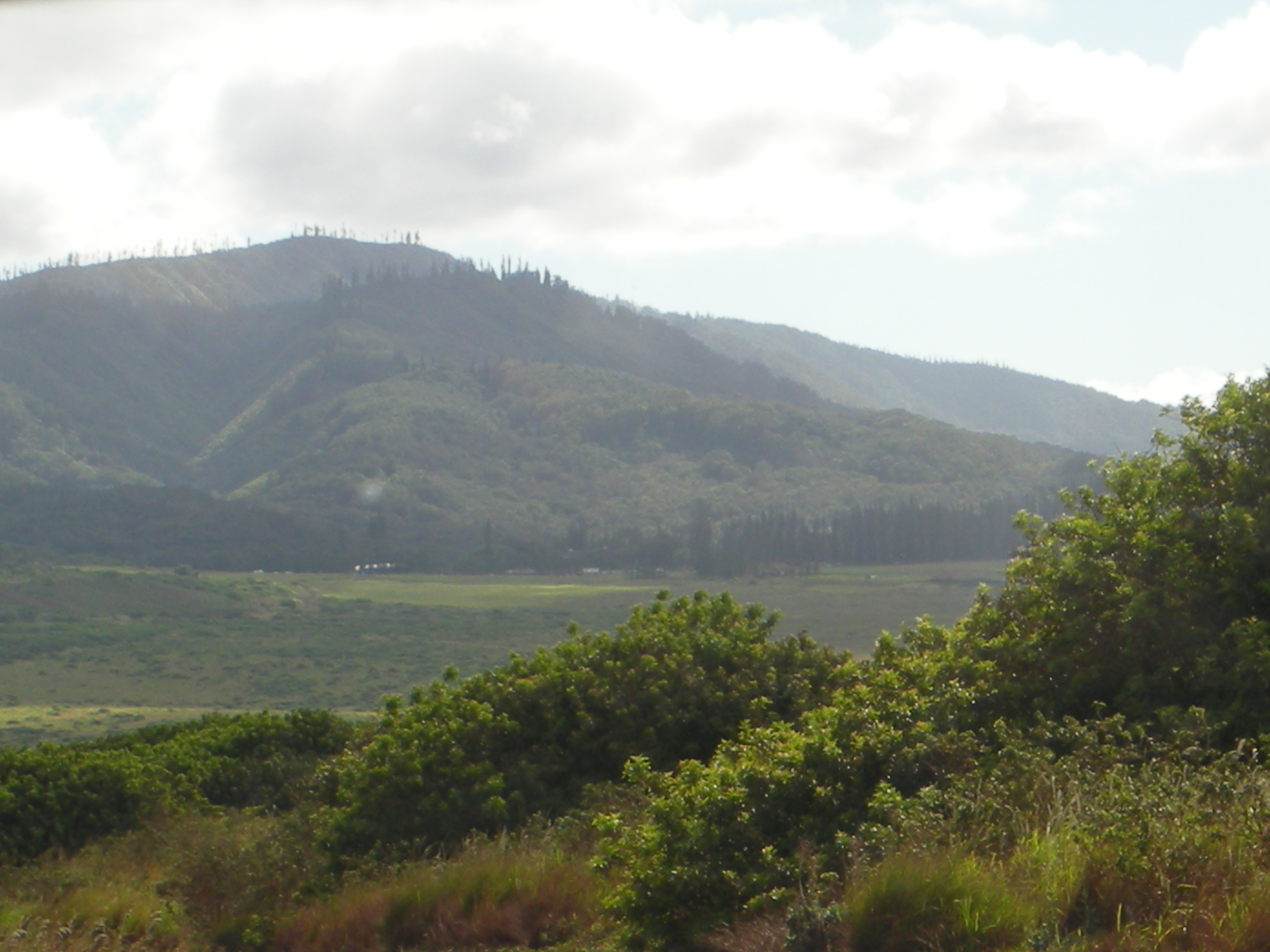
Mountains on Lānaʻi

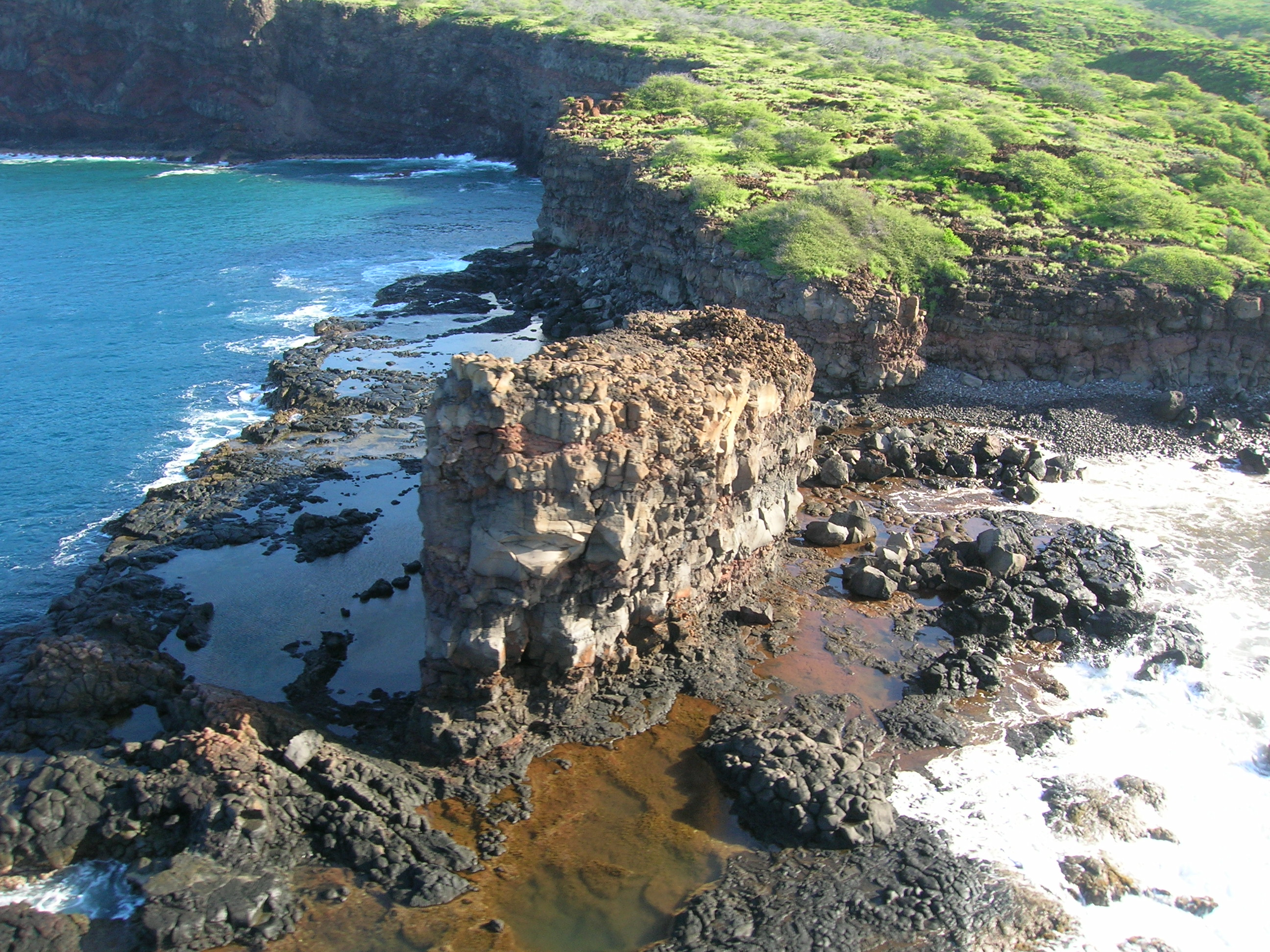
Kaneapua Rock

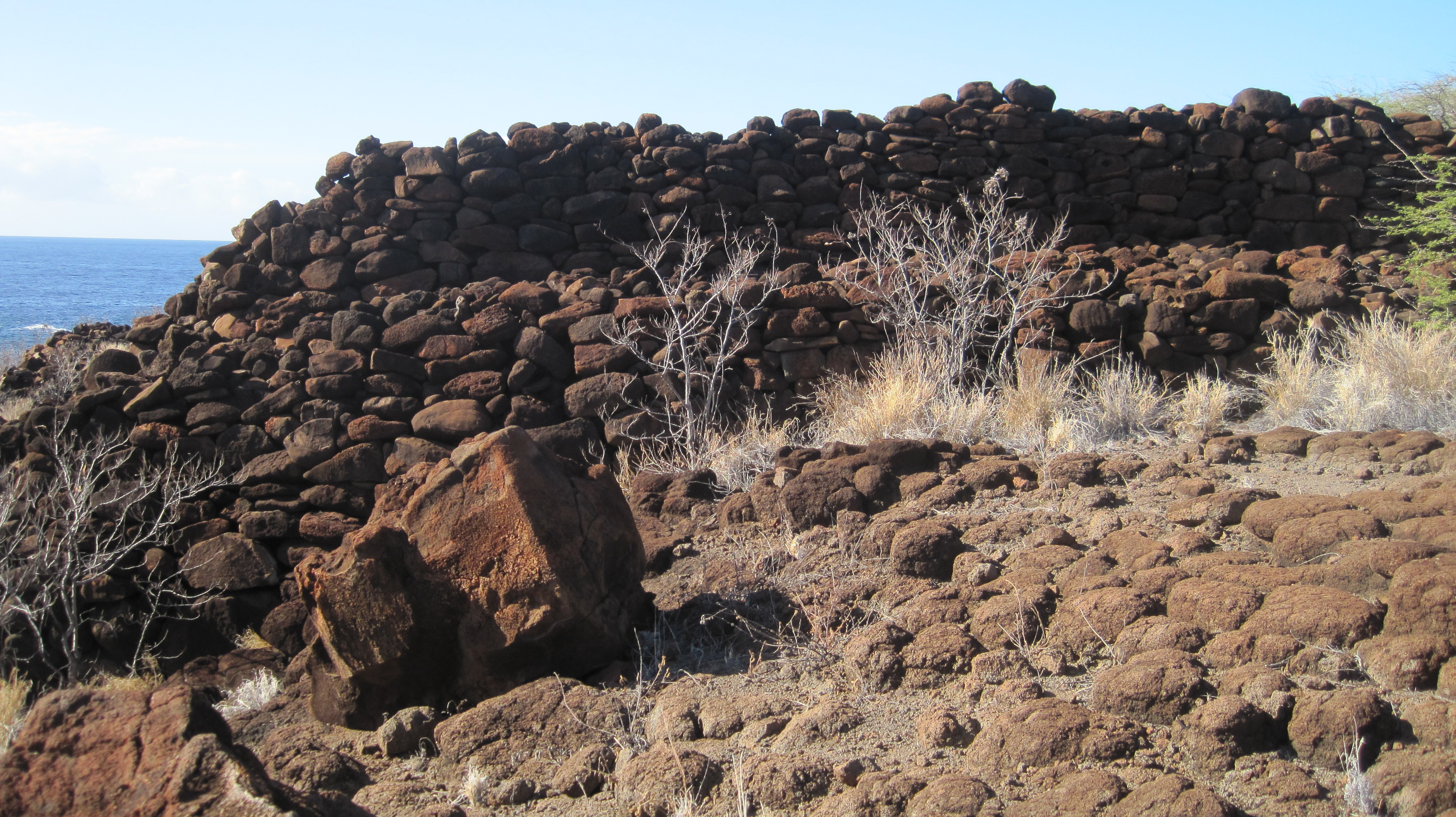
Walls of Halulu Heiau at Kaunolu Village Site

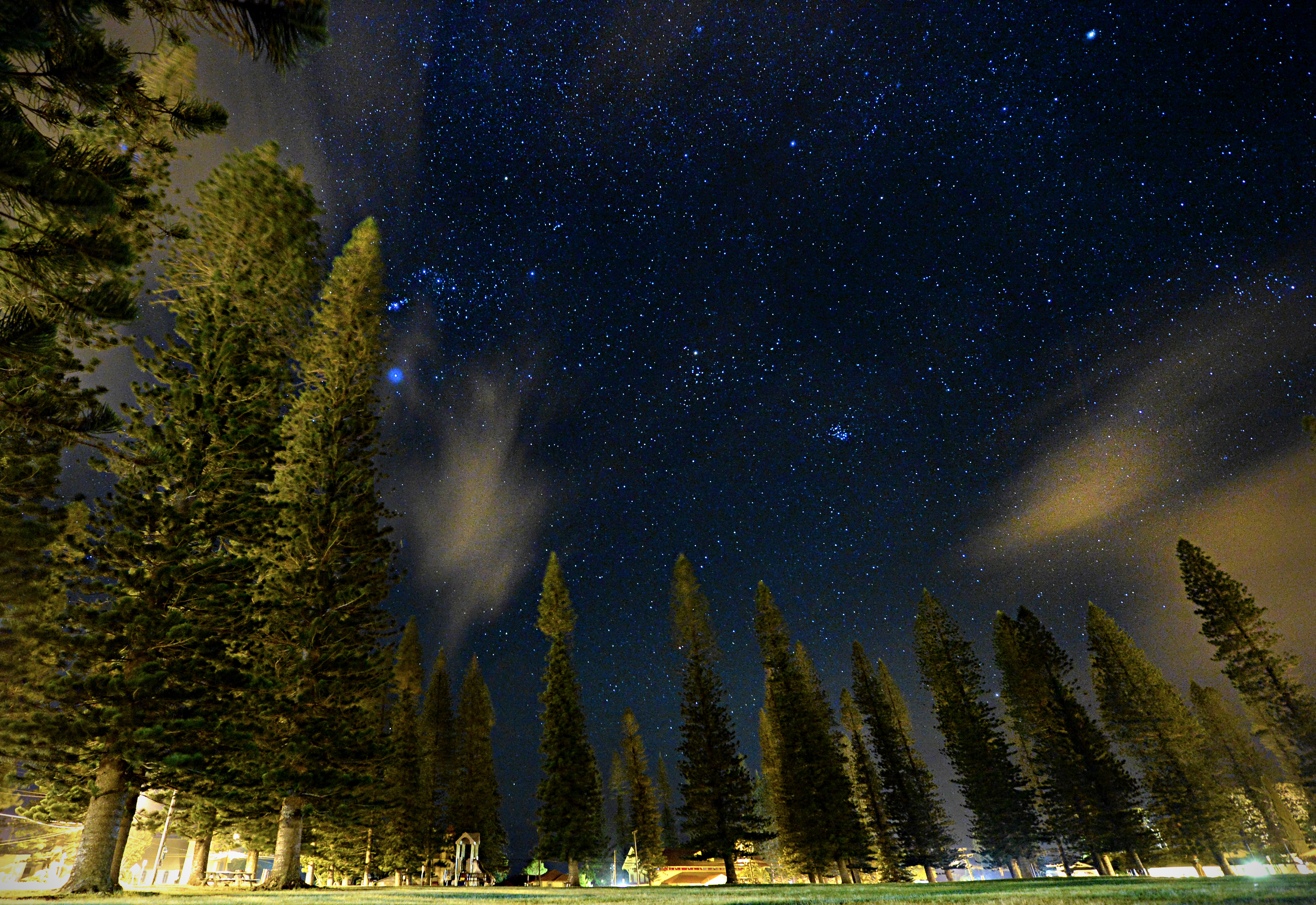
View of the night sky from inside of Dole Park

== See also ==
- National Register of Historic Places listings in Lānaʻi
