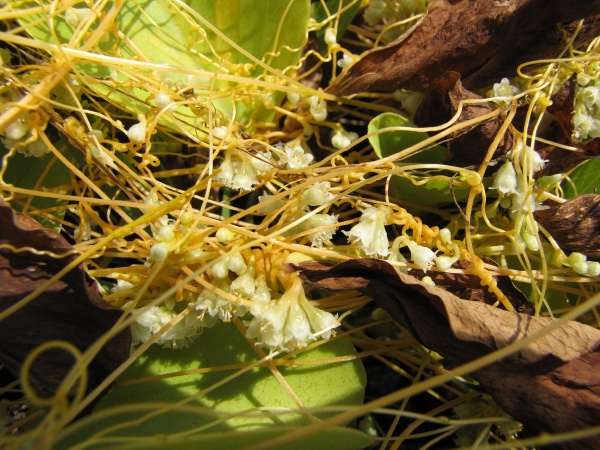

Scientific classification
- Kingdom: Plantae
- Clade: Tracheophytes
- Clade: Angiosperms
- Clade: Eudicots
- Clade: Asterids
- Order: Solanales
- Family: Convolvulaceae
- Genus: Cuscuta
- Species: C. sandwichiana

Binomial name
- Cuscuta sandwichiana Choisy

Synonyms
- Grammica sandwichiana (Choisy) O.Deg., I.Deg., Hadac & Chrtek

= Cuscuta sandwichiana =

Species of flowering plant

Cuscuta sandwichiana (Kauna'oa kahakai) is a parasitic vine and the only member of the genus Cuscuta (commonly called "dodder") that is endemic to the Hawaiian Islands. It parasitizes a wide variety of indigenous, endemic and introduced plants on all of the main Hawaiian islands. It grows in coastal areas with sandy soils from sea level elevation to 975 feet. The indigenous kaunaʻoa pehu (literally "swollen kaunaʻoa") Cassytha filiformis is a similar-looking species with the same parasitic nature. It is an unrelated plant in the laurel family Lauraceae which can be distinguished by its larger, coarser yellowish-green stems.

== Appearance ==
Cuscuta sandwichiana is a twining vine with thin, leafless yellow to yellow-orange stems and very small yellowish flowers which grow in small clusters along the stems.

== Hawaiian use ==
Lei (garland): Kaunaʻoa kahakai was used for both lei o ka poʻo (head lei) and lei āʻī (neck lei)

Medicinal: Plants of both kaunaʻoa kahakai and kaunaʻoa pehu were pounded until soft, strained, and their juices were consumed to "thin blood" for women who had given birth or who had "thick blood".
