= Four Seasons Resort Lanai =

Resort in Lanai, Hawaii

- Former names: The Manele Bay Hotel
- Hotel chain: Four Seasons Hotels and Resorts

General information
- Location: Lānaʻi, Hawaii, 1 Manele Bay Rd, Lanai City, HI 96763
- Coordinates: 20°44′30″N 156°53′47″W
- Completed: 1991 (as Manele Bay)

Other information
- Number of rooms: 168
- Number of suites: 45
- Number of restaurants: 5

Website
- www.fourseasons.com/lanai/

Four Seasons Resort Lanai is a Four Seasons resort hotel in Lanai City on the island of Lānaʻi, the smallest and least inhabited of Hawaii's six major islands that once was recognized for its pineapple plantation. Lānaʻi has two other hotels, Sensei Lanai, A Four Seasons Resort (previously known as "The Lodge at Koele"), and Hotel Lanai, a 3-star boutique hotel.

Originally opened as The Manele Bay Hotel in 1991, the hotel started operating under the Four Seasons brand in 2005. After it underwent a major renovation from 2012 to 2016, the Four Seasons Resort Lanai reopened in 2016. It has 168 rooms, 45 suites, and a golf course designed by Jack Nicklaus.

== History ==
=== The Manele Bay Hotel ===
The Manele Bay Hotel was built in 1991, the year of Lānaʻi's last pineapple harvest, which began in the 1920s by James Dole, dubbed the King of Pineapple. Over the following decades, the island became a major supplier, and in some years it accounted for 75% of the world's production of pineapple. But a few years after it bought the Dole Corporation, Castle & Cooke announced its intention to transform the island into a luxury resort destination, and in 1985, after being acquired by David H. Murdock, Castle & Cooke started taking serious steps for the new development plan. Construction began a few years later. The Lodge at Koele opened in 1990, followed by The Manele Bay Hotel the next year.

=== Four Seasons Resort Lanai ===
The hotel came under the management of Four Seasons in 2005. When it reopened under the new brand, it reflected a combination of Polynesian and Hawaiian designs, along with many rooms that had large lanais and views of Hulopoʻe Beach, which offered snorkeling.

In 2012, Oracle co-founder Larry Ellison bought 98% of the island from Castle & Cooke for a reported $300 million, with the remaining 2% owned by the state. Ellison decided to transform the Manele Bay into a luxury resort at a cost of $450 million. It took years of work and a seven-month closure before it was completed in February 2016, with the hotel's lobby redesigned three times. It featured rooms designed by Todd-Avery Lenahan.

== Property ==
Four Seasons Resort Lanai has 213 guest rooms, including 45 private suites. Other amenities include spa services, pools, and fitness facilities. It has three meeting rooms that have 10,867 square feet (1,009.6 m^{2}) of space and hold up to 560 people. It includes a Nobu restaurant run by chef Nobu Matsuhisa; Ellison owns another Nobu restaurant in Malibu.

The resort was constructed with a 7,039-yard, par-72 championship premier golf course designed by Jack Nicklaus.

== Rating and awards ==
Four Seasons Resort Lanai is ranked by the AAA as a Five Diamond Resort, while ONE Forty Restaurant ranked it a Four Diamond Restaurant. It is also ranked as a 5-Star Resort by Forbes Travel Guide (formerly Mobil).

It was named the #1 hotel in the United States by the U.S. News & World Report on its 2018 and 2020 lists. It was listed on Robb Report's Best of the Best 2016-Journeys. The golf course received Golf Digest's Editors’ Choice Award for Best in Travel 2018.

== The Lodge at Koele ==
Eight miles away, The Lodge at Koele was built in 1990 and became Four Seasons Resort Lana'i, The Lodge at Koele in 2005. It closed in January 2015 to be renovated. It reopened in November 2019 as Sensei Lanai, A Four Seasons Resort, a wellness resort with 92 rooms and 4 suites. At the time it was Four Seasons' first adults-only wellness resort. Four Seasons is set to resume full management of the hotel in December 2026, when it will be renamed Four Seasons Resort Lanai at Koele.
