= Lānaʻi City, Hawaii =

Lānaʻi City
- Census-designated place
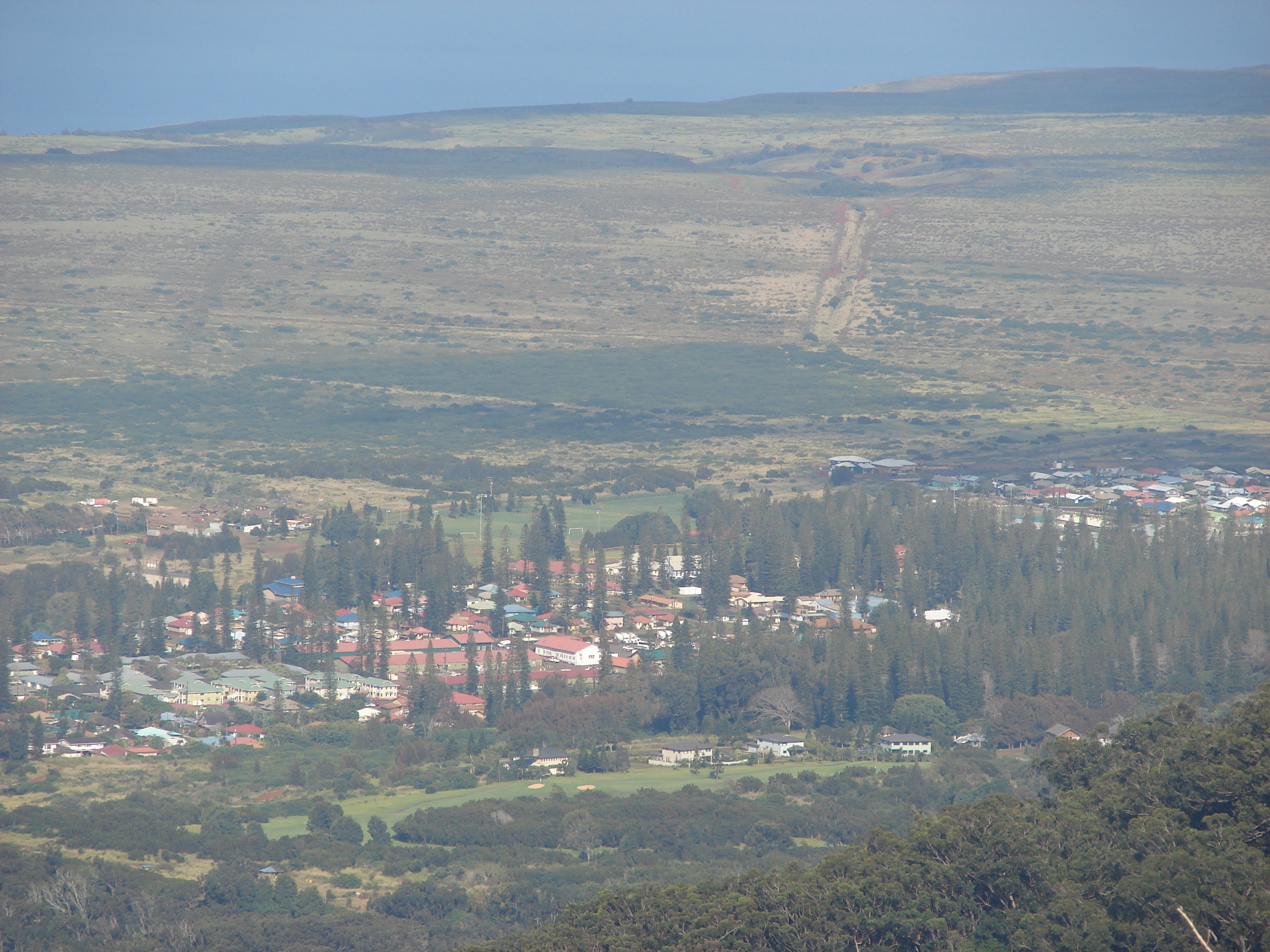
- Lānaʻi City

- Location in Maui County and the state of Hawai‘i
- Coordinates: 20°49′39″N 156°55′19″W
- Country: United States
- State: Hawaii
- County: Maui

Area
  - Total: 6.77 sq mi (17.53 km^{2})
  - Land: 6.77 sq mi (17.53 km^{2})
  - Water: 0 sq mi (0.00 km^{2})
- Elevation: 1,644 ft (501 m)

Population (2020)
  - Total: 3,332
  - Density: 492/sq mi (190.1/km^{2})
- Time zone: UTC-10
- ZIP code: 96763
- Area code: 808
- FIPS code: 15-43700
- GNIS feature ID: 0361713

Lānaʻi City is a census-designated place (CDP) on the island of Lānaʻi, in Maui County, Hawai‘i, United States. The population was 3,332 at the 2020 census. Lānaʻi City is the island's commercial center. Many of the island's restaurants and shops are in the town square that surrounds Dole Park, and the only hospital on the island, Lānaʻi Community Hospital, is near the park.

Lānaʻi City is served by Lānaʻi Airport (LNY).

== Geography and climate ==
According to the United States Census Bureau, the CDP has an area of 6.9 square miles (17.9 km^{2}), all land.

Lānaʻi City experiences a tropical savanna climate (Köppen: As, Trewartha: Asab) with a mostly dry summer season. The average temperature in January is almost cool enough to qualify this climate as a warm-winter form of a Mediterranean climate (Köppen climate classification Csa or even Csb). An average monthly temperature of 64 °F (18 °C) is the lower limit for tropical climate classification.

Climate data for Lanai City
Month	Jan	Feb	Mar	Apr	May	Jun	Jul	Aug	Sep	Oct	Nov	Dec	Year
Record high °F (°C)	82 (28)	82 (28)	86 (30)	87 (31)	86 (30)	86 (30)	86 (30)	87 (31)	89 (32)	92 (33)	85 (29)	85 (29)	92 (33)
Mean daily maximum °F (°C)	72.0 (22.2)	72.8 (22.7)	72.9 (22.7)	73.7 (23.2)	74.7 (23.7)	76.2 (24.6)	76.8 (24.9)	78.1 (25.6)	78.5 (25.8)	77.4 (25.2)	75.8 (24.3)	73.6 (23.1)	75.2 (24.0)
Daily mean °F (°C)	65.9 (18.8)	66.0 (18.9)	66.6 (19.2)	67.5 (19.7)	68.4 (20.2)	70.2 (21.2)	71.1 (21.7)	72.1 (22.3)	72.2 (22.3)	71.2 (21.8)	69.7 (20.9)	67.5 (19.7)	69.0 (20.6)
Mean daily minimum °F (°C)	59.7 (15.4)	59.2 (15.1)	60.3 (15.7)	61.3 (16.3)	62.1 (16.7)	64.2 (17.9)	65.3 (18.5)	66.1 (18.9)	65.8 (18.8)	64.9 (18.3)	63.6 (17.6)	61.3 (16.3)	62.8 (17.1)
Record low °F (°C)	48 (9)	47 (8)	49 (9)	49 (9)	52 (11)	49 (9)	49 (9)	49 (9)	47 (8)	49 (9)	52 (11)	48 (9)	47 (8)
Average rainfall inches (mm)	5.05 (128)	4.06 (103)	2.88 (73)	2.60 (66)	2.17 (55)	1.61 (41)	1.66 (42)	1.40 (36)	2.09 (53)	2.51 (64)	3.14 (80)	4.39 (112)	33.56 (852)
Average rainy days (≥ 0.01 in)	7.7	6.2	7.1	3.8	2.0	1.1	2.4	1.4	2.4	2.8	6.5	7.8	51.2
Source: NOAA/NCDC, Weatherbase

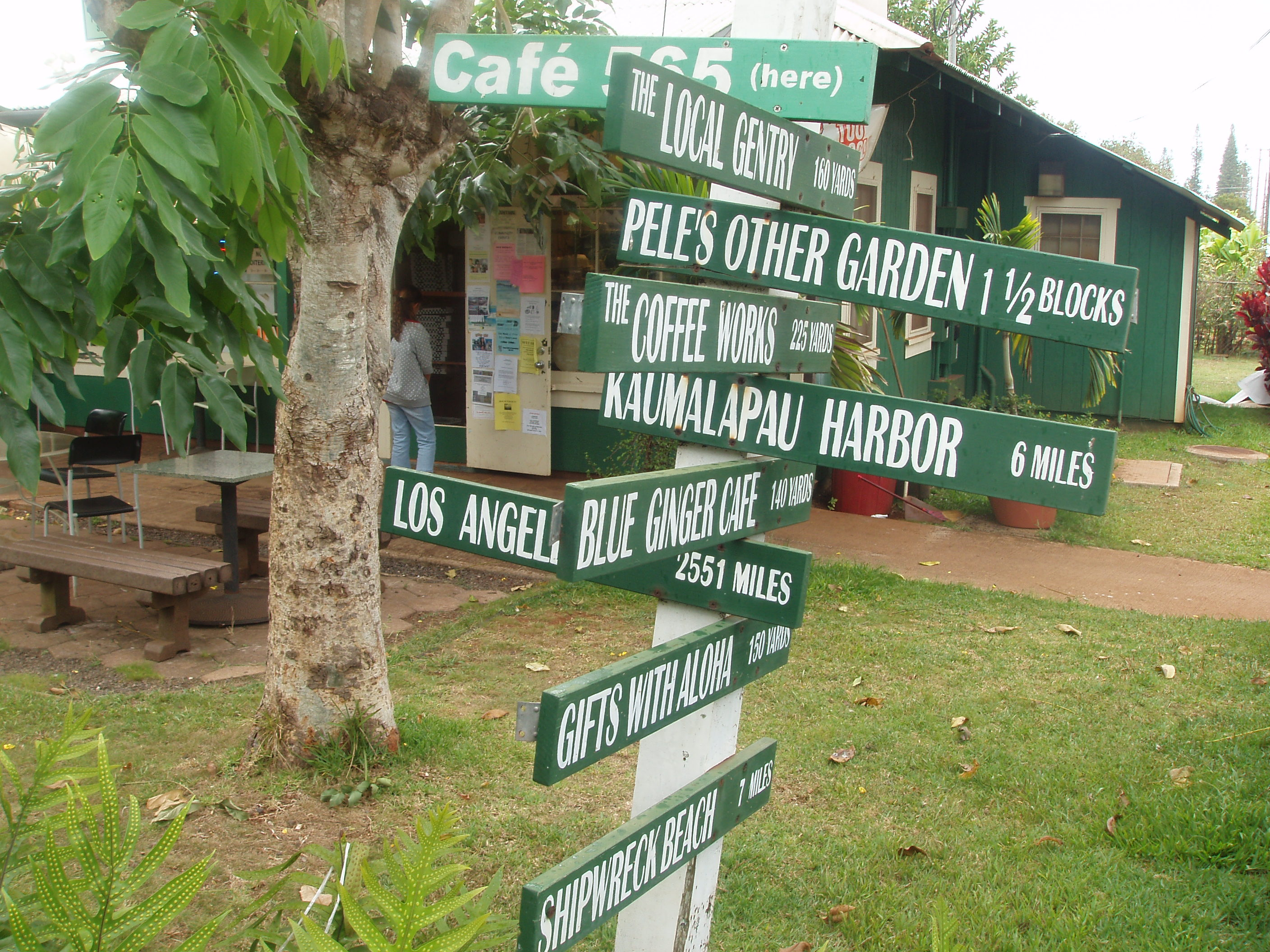
Street sign near Dole Park

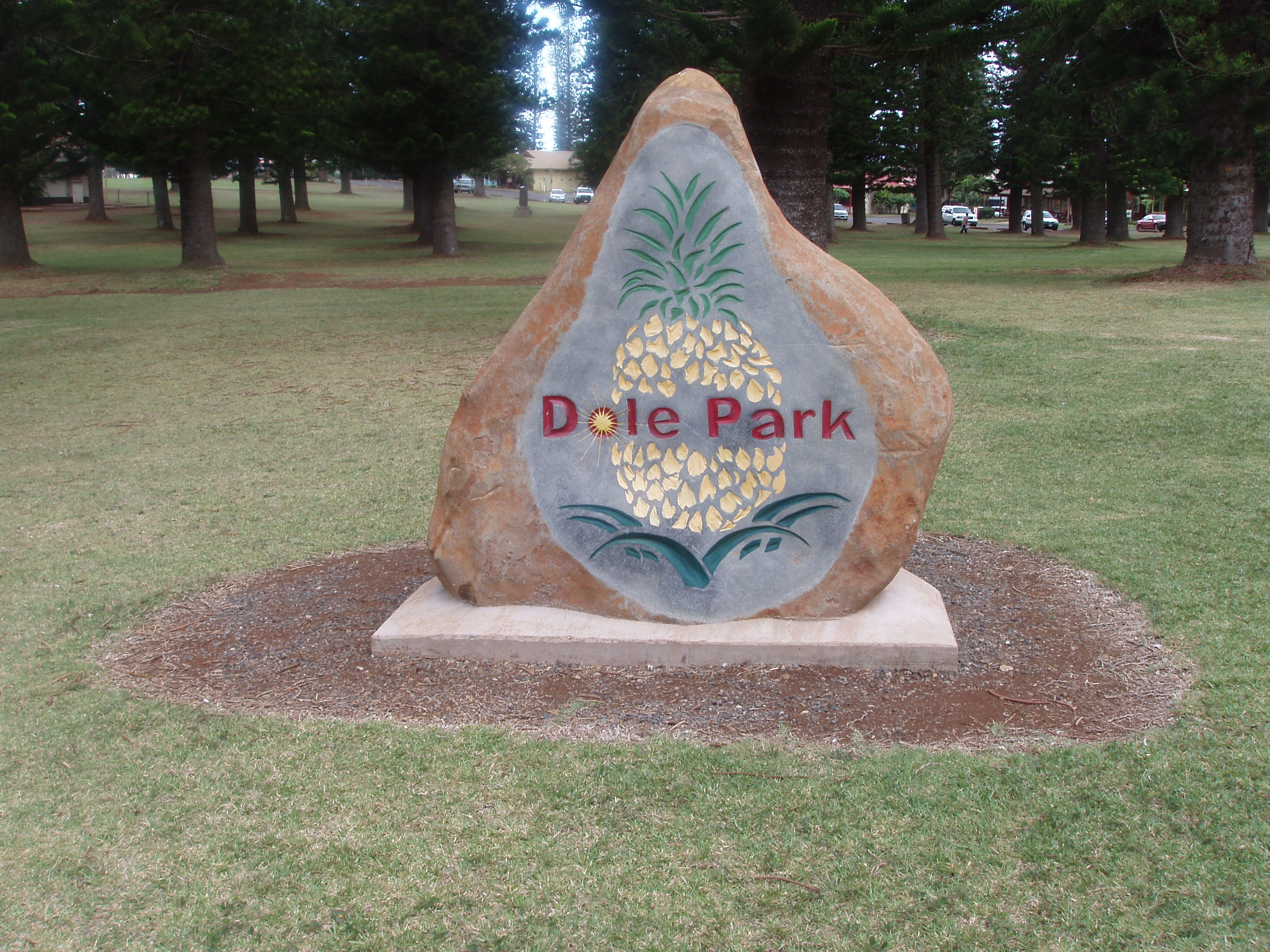
Dole Park

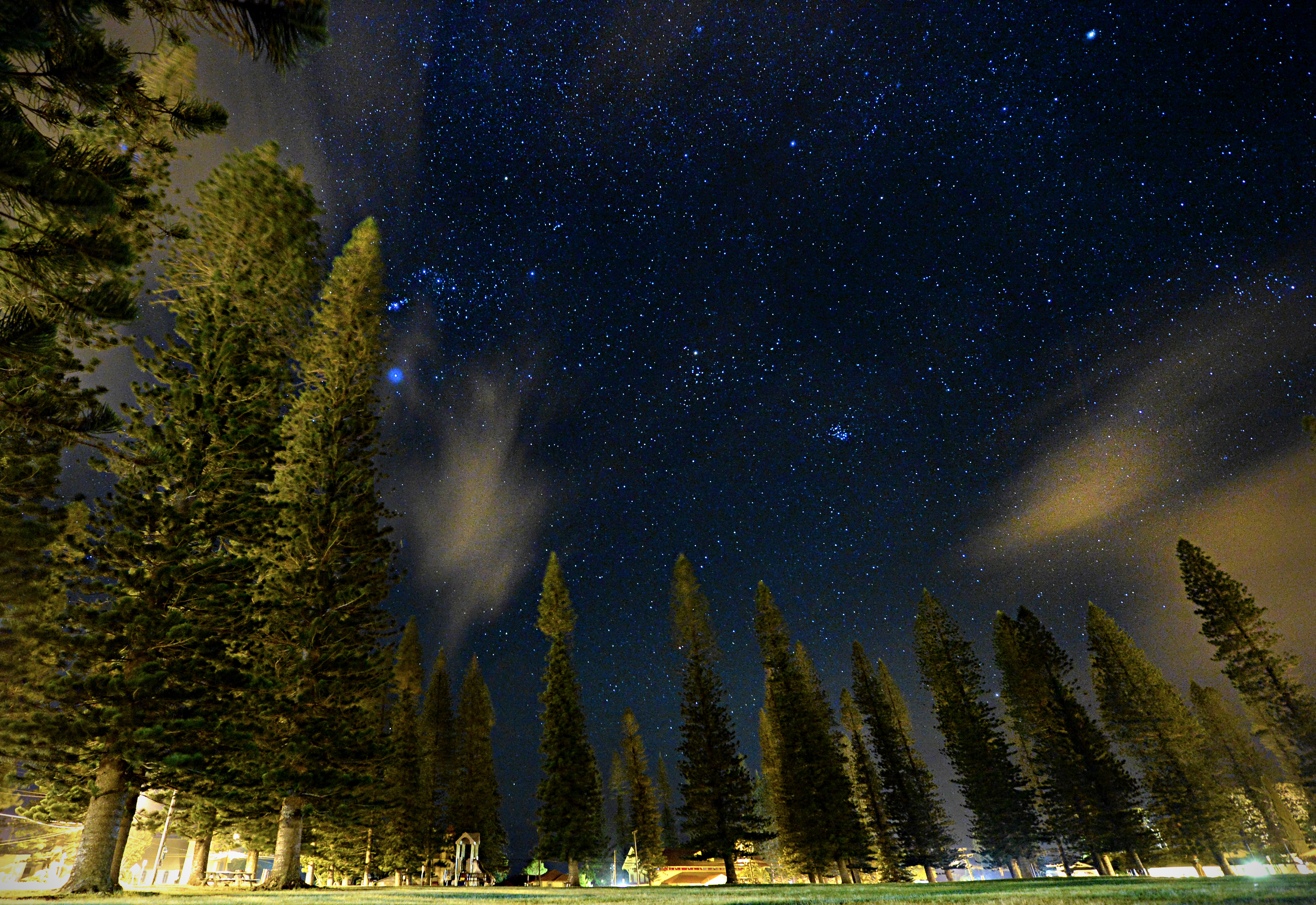
View of the night sky from Dole Park

== History ==
Lānaʻi was once the home of the pineapple plantation of entrepreneur James Drummond Dole, which spanned over 20,000 acres (81 km^{2}) and employed thousands of workers. Dole owned the entire island for a time, and in the 1920s built Lānaʻi City to house and serve the workers. It was the first model city in Hawai‘i. In 1923 several stores, a bank, a hospital, a theater, a church, and business headquarters were built around an open park space. In 1930 model homes for couples featuring two bedrooms, a large living room, and a kitchen, with running water, electricity, and spacious yards were erected. The single men's houses had three furnished rooms and also running water and electricity.

In 2009, the corporation Castle & Cooke, which had spun off from the Dole Food Company, announced its intent to demolish much of what remained of the historic district, including homes, a laundromat, and a jailhouse—all dating to the 1920s—in order to build new commercial structures. The development would have included a supermarket the National Trust for Historic Preservation called "oversized" and "out-of-scale". No intact plantation towns remain on any of the other Hawaiian Islands.

In 2012, Castle & Cooke sold its island possessions (totaling 98% of the island) to Larry Ellison for $300 million.

== Demographics ==
Historical population
Census	Pop.	Note	%±
2020	3,332		—
U.S. Decennial Census

As of the census of 2000, there were 3,164 people, 1,148 households, and 796 families residing in the CDP. The population density was 885.5 inhabitants per square mile (341.9/km^{2}). There were 1,343 housing units at an average density of 375.9 units per square mile (145.1 units/km^{2}). The racial makeup of the CDP was 13.24% White, 0.13% African American, 0.38% Native American, 58.09% Asian, 7.02% Pacific Islander, 0.32% from other races, and 20.83% from two or more races. Hispanic or Latino residents of any race were 7.74% of the population.

There were 1,148 households, out of which 34.9% had children under the age of 18 living with them, 53.7% were married couples living together, 9.9% had a female householder with no husband present, and 30.6% were non-families. 25.7% of all households were made up of individuals, and 8.8% had someone living alone who was 65 years of age or older. The average household size was 2.75 and the average family size was 3.33.

In the CDP 28.0% of the population was under the age of 18, 7.9% was from 18 to 24, 28.3% from 25 to 44, 21.4% from 45 to 64, and 14.4% was 65 years of age or older. The median age was 35 years. For every 100 females, there were 101.4 males. For every 100 females age 18 and over, there were 100.6 males.

The median income for a household in the CDP was $43,271, and the median income for a family was $49,209. Males had a median income of $29,800 versus $27,065 for females. The per capita income for the CDP was $18,668. About 8.5% of families and 9.5% of the population were below the poverty line, including 7.2% of those under age 18 and 11.9% of those age 65 or over.

== Urban infrastructure ==
Lānaʻi City has a community hospital, a community health center, an Olympic-size public pool, a state-of-the art movie theater, a supermarket, and a public library.

== See also ==
- Lanai High and Elementary School
