= ʻUpolu Point =

ʻUpolu Point is the most northern point on the island of Hawaiʻi in the Hawaiian Islands. It is an extruding landform created by cooled lava from an old eruption from Kohala volcano. The main town on the extrusion is Hawi, Hawaii about 2 miles (3 km) inland. The main road is Akoni Pule Highway t(Hawaii state route 270) which starts at the Hawaii Belt Road in Kawaihae, along the west coast of the point, and then through the towns of Hawi and Kapaʻau, ending at Pololū Valley. Upolu Point also overlooks Mahukona Harbor.

The landform extends into the Alenuihaha Channel which separates Hawaiʻi island and Maui as well as Kahoʻolawe to the northwest. The opposite end of the island is Ka Lae known as South Point.

No paved roads are located along the east side of the landform due to the undulating terrain. The western side of the point is smooth and this is on which the ring road is located. A smaller road runs along the central area of the point and reconnects the end of the main road to the rest of the ring road.

The nearest airport is Upolu Airport which is located slightly inland from the most northern tip of Upolu Point. Coordinates are 20°16′7.1″N 155°51′12.96″W.

There are two major reservoirs near Upolu Point:

- Puuokumau Reservoir
- Kehena Reservoir

These are both located along the Kohala Mountain Road, which connects Hawi to the Belt Road near Waimea along the center of Upolu Point.
