= Māhukona, Hawaii =

Mahukona Lighthouse
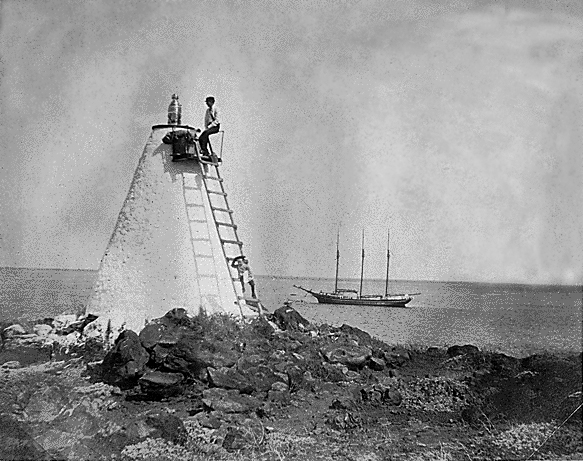
- Original Māhukona light, 1904
- Location: Māhukona, Hawaii, United States
- Coordinates: 20°10′49″N 155°54′05″W

Tower
- Constructed: 1899
- Construction: stone (tower)
- Shape: truncated cone

Light
- Deactivated: 1915
- Focal height: 75 ft (23 m)
- Range: 10 nmi (19 km; 12 mi)
- Current light
- Constructed: 1915
- Construction: reinforced concrete
- Height: 22 m (72 ft)
- Shape: square pyramid
- Markings: White (tower)
- Operator: United States Coast Guard
- Focal height: 64 m (210 ft)
- Range: 6 nmi (11 km; 6.9 mi)
- Characteristic: Fl W 4s

Māhukona is a former settlement on the island of Hawaiʻi. The extinct submerged volcano Māhukona, off shore and to the south, is named for this area. The settlement was once the terminus of the Hawaiian Railroad.

== History ==
Māhukona was a traditional ahupuaʻa (land division) that extended from a bay to the slopes of Kohala mountain. Much was owned by Princess Ruth Keʻelikōlani at one time. The name means "leeward steam" in the Hawaiian language. Lapakahi State Historical Park is just to the south. The harbor is located just off of Akoni Pule Highway, Hawaii Route 270.

While Samuel Gardner Wilder was minister of the interior, he secured a charter for a railroad company in 1880. The first sugarcane plantation in the Kohala district was started by Elias Bond in 1863, but transportation proved difficult. Wilder's idea was to transport sugarcane from plantations on the wet windward side of Kohala to Māhukona where ships could land. Wilder already ran a steamship company, so built a pier at the Māhukona harbor. Samuel Parker planned a railroad from the east coast to the port of Hilo, but was unable to fund the project. Work was begun in 1881, the first track opened in 1882, and by 1883 had reached about 20 miles (32 km) to the plantation at Niuliʻi, 20°13′23″N 155°44′48″W. There it met the barrier of Pololū Valley.

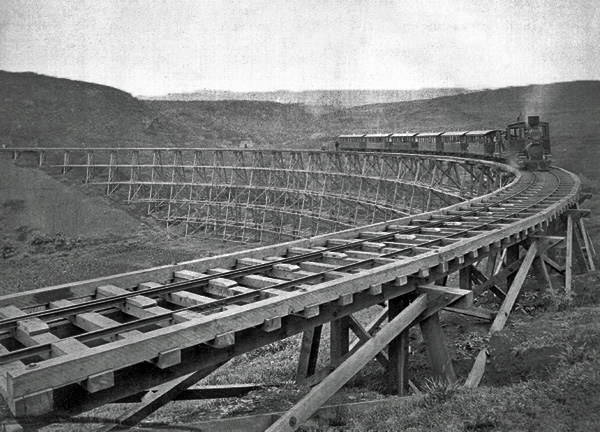
Hawaiian Railroad near Māhukona built in 1882

Wilder named the first locomotive Kina'u, after his wife. He had plans to extend his railroad to Hilo, but that did not happen until after his death, built by the Hawaii Consolidated Railway. The two never became connected as dreamed by Wilder. In 1897 the railroad reincorporated as the Hawaii Railway Company, Ltd., and was bought by the sugar companies in 1899.

A sugar mill was built on the north side of the bay, and its remains still stand. A larger wharf was built in 1911 by the Territory of Hawaii that was immediately destroyed by a storm, and rebuilt. In 1913 it was the fourth busiest port in the islands, but only had 13 vessels enter. The first lighthouse was built in 1889 just to the south of the bay. In 1915 it was replaced by a concrete pyramid 22 feet (6.7 m) tall. By 1937, the Kohala Sugar Company had consolidated into the mill at Māhukona, and became Mahukona Terminals Ltd. In 1941 the port closed for World War II. On October 29, 1945, the railroad closed.

The town, which once consisted of about 40 families, was abandoned in the 1950s. In 1956 the harbor was closed. The bay is now the site of a park of Hawaii County. Although called Māhukona Beach Park, the shoreline is rocky and lacks a sandy beach. Fishing, snorkeling, picnic areas, and camping are available.

In the 1990s a developer obtained permits to build a golf course and resort in the area. The land-holding company was renamed the Kohala Preserve Conservation Trust, LLC, but encountered opposition from area residents. A historic song about Māhukona, translated as "sugar boiler" was recently recorded.
