= Kohala Mountain Road =

State highway in Hawaii County, Hawaii, US

Hawaii Route 250
- Kohala Mountain Road
- Route 250 highlighted in red

Route information
- Maintained by HDOT
- Length: 19.276 mi (31.022 km)

Major junctions
- South end: Route 19 near Waimea
- North end: Route 270 (ʻAkoni Pule Highway) in Hāwī

Location
- Country: United States
- State: Hawaii
- Counties: Hawaii

Highway system
- Routes in Hawaii
← Route 240	→ Route 270

Kohala Mountain Road, designated Route 250, travels upon the Kohala mountain on the island of Hawaiʻi in Hawaii County, Hawaii, United States.

== Route description ==
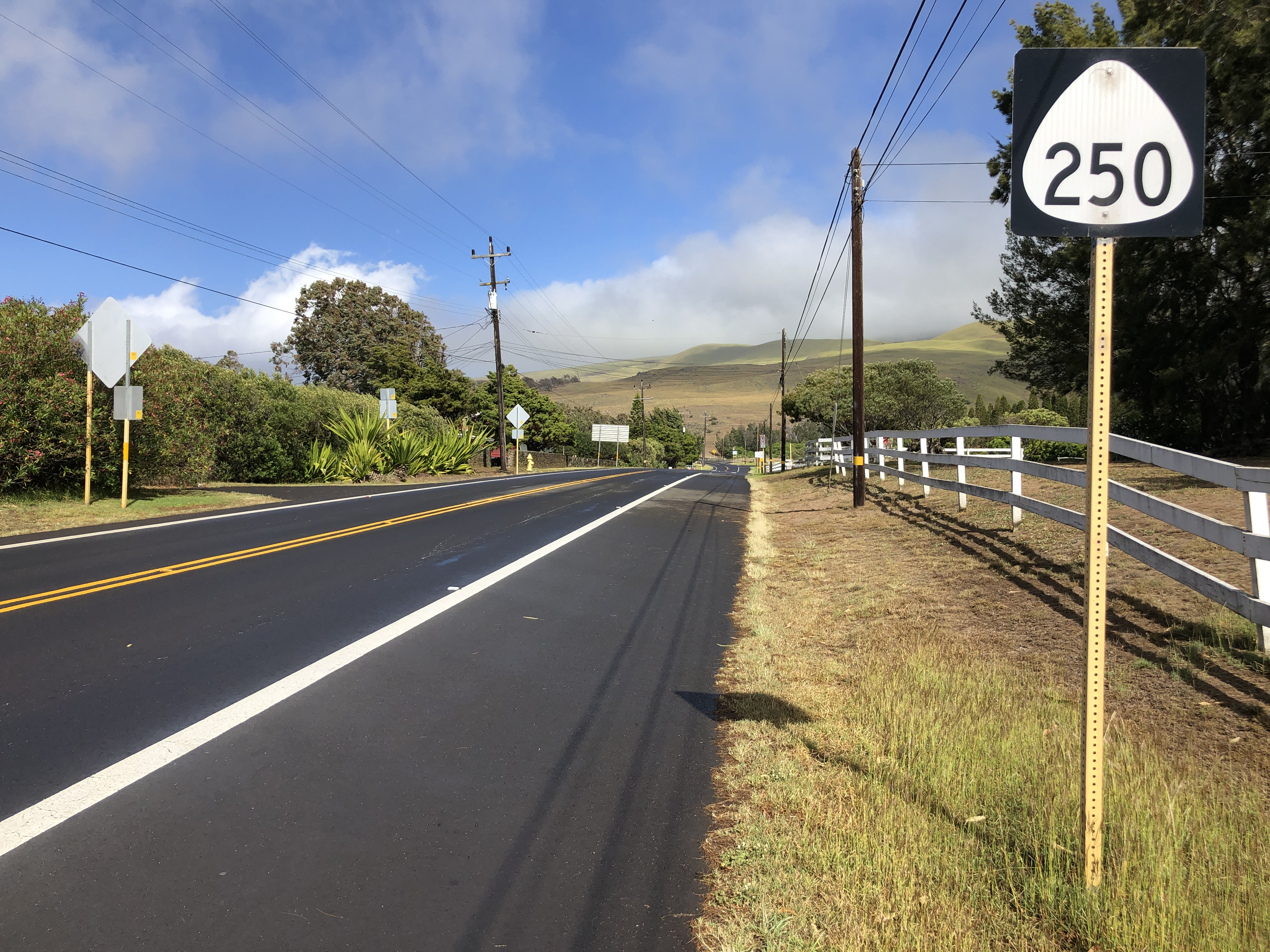
Route 250 northbound at Route 19 in Waiaka

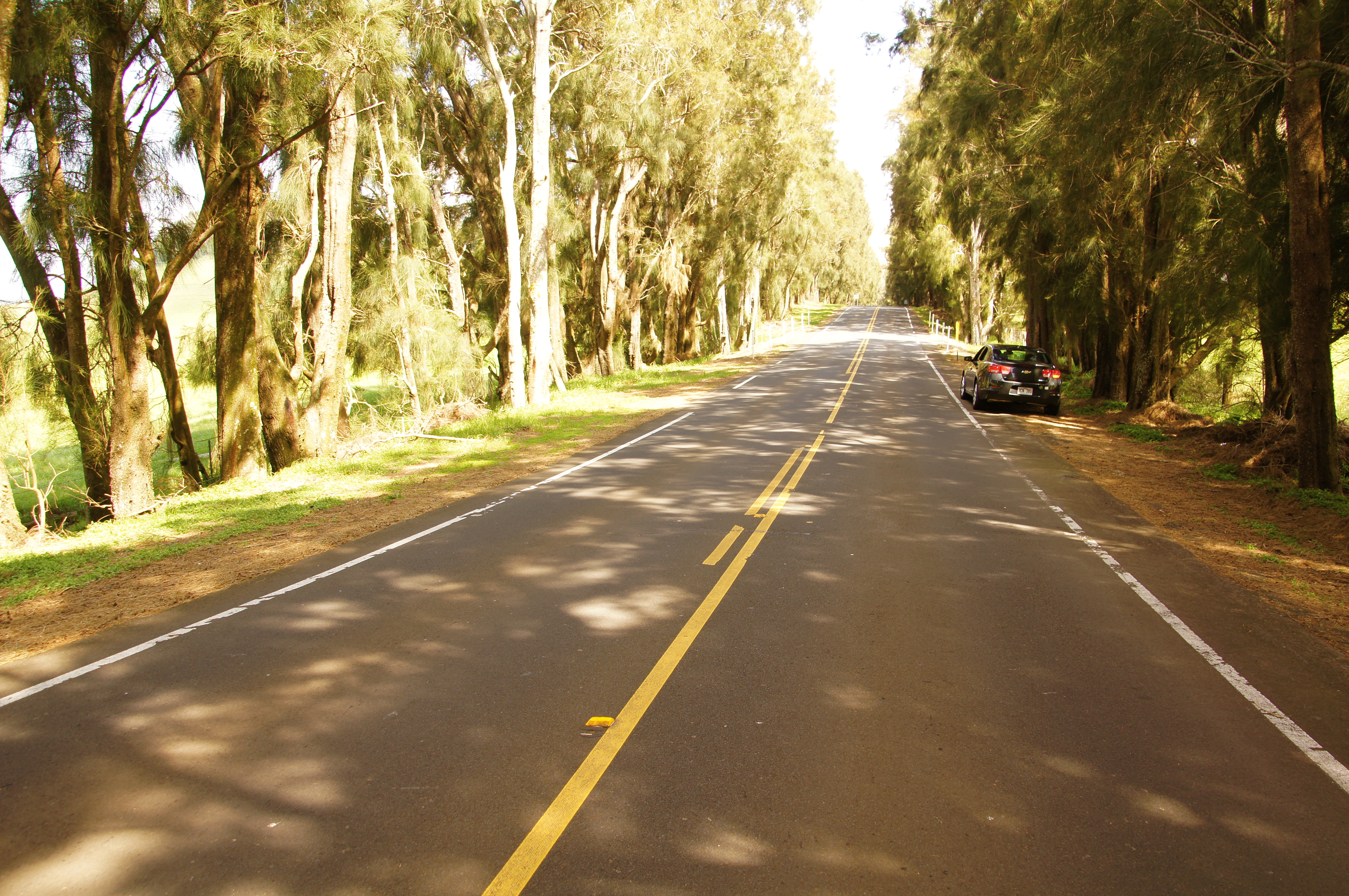
Ranch lands on both sides of a coniferous-lined Highway 250.

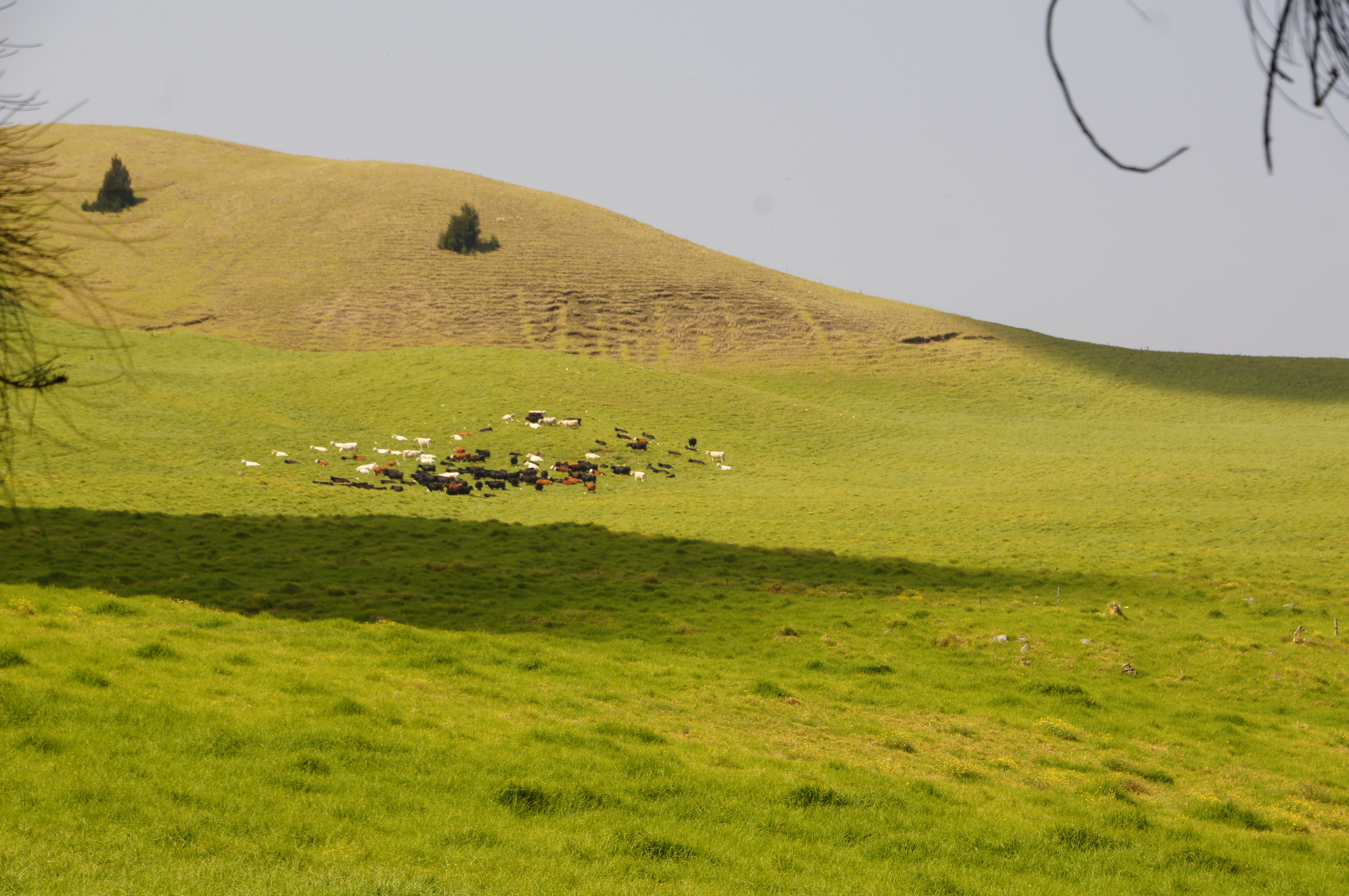
Views of ranch land may surprise some visitors to the Big Island. Looking southwest from the Kohala Mountain Road, Highway 250.

Kohala Mountain road, known locally as "the High Road", begins about 1.8 miles (2.9 km) west of Waimea, at 20°1′36″N 155°41′57″W, near the Hawaii Preparatory Academy campus. Route 19 at this point is known as Hawaii Belt Road, or Kawaihae Road. The northern terminus (where Route 250 is known as Hāwī Road), is in the town of Hāwī at 20°14′16″N 155°49′49″W, at the intersection of ʻAkoni Pule Highway (Route 270).

== Major junctions ==
The entire route is in Hawaii County.

Location	mi	km	Destinations	Notes
Waimea	0.000	0.000	Route 19 (Kawaihae Road) – Waimea, Kawaihae	
Hawi	19.276	31.022	Route 270 (Akoni Pule Highway) – Mahukona, Kawaihae, Kapaau, Pololu	
1.000 mi = 1.609 km; 1.000 km = 0.621 mi

== See also ==
- List of state highways in Hawaii
- List of highways numbered 311
