= Halaʻula, Hawaii =

Census-designated place in Hawaii, United States

Halaʻula
- Census-designated place
- Location in Hawaii County and the state of Hawaii
- Coordinates: 20°13′57″N 155°46′59″W
- Country: United States
- State: Hawaii
- County: Hawaii

Area
  - Total: 4.70 sq mi (12.16 km^{2})
  - Land: 4.37 sq mi (11.33 km^{2})
  - Water: 0.32 sq mi (0.83 km^{2})
- Elevation: 259 ft (79 m)

Population (2020)
  - Total: 773
  - Density: 176.7/sq mi (68.23/km^{2})
- Time zone: UTC-10 (Hawaii-Aleutian)
- ZIP code: 96755
- Area code: 808
- FIPS code: 15-09700
- GNIS feature ID: 0358902

Halaʻula is a census-designated place (CDP) in Hawaiʻi County, Hawaiʻi, United States. The population was 773 at the 2020 census.

== Geography ==
Halaʻula is in the North Kohala region and peninsula, on the northern side of the island of Hawaiʻi. It is bordered to the west by Kapaʻau. Hawaii Route 270 is the main road through the community, leading west then south 22 miles (35 km) to Hawaii Route 19 at Waikui and east 4 miles (6 km) to its terminus at an overlook of the Pololū Valley.

According to the United States Census Bureau, the CDP has a total area of 2.9 square miles (7.6 km^{2}), of which 2.7 square miles (6.9 km^{2}) are land and 0.3 square miles (0.8 km^{2}), or 9.96%, are water, as the CDP limits extend into the Pacific Ocean.

== History ==
Halaʻula is within the Bond District, a historic district on the National Register of Historic Places. It includes the 19th century Bond House, also named Iole after its location and a part of the homestead of missionaries Ellen and Reverend Elias Bond. The nucleus of this rambling New England dwelling was built in 1840 by the Rev. Isaac Bliss who was assisted by a carpenter from Honolulu. First occupied in January 1841, it was of "native wood and plaster on stone foundation with a good cellar."

Assigned to the Kohala Station in June 1841, Rev. and Mrs. Elias Bond moved into the thatched mission house. Mr. Bond described the first addition in 1842: "Our dwelling house is 40 feet long by 36 feet wide. The study and native room are 21 feet by 24 feet."

Through the years the home was expanded and modified to accommodate several generations who lived under its roof. Lived in until 1930, it is now kept as a family retreat with all its old furnishings. Surrounded by the original outbuildings, the Bond House remains the last mission complex still intact in Hawaiʻi.

== Demographics ==
Historical population
Census	Pop.	Note	%±
2020	773		—
U.S. Decennial Census

As of the census of 2000, there were 495 people, 149 households, and 113 families residing in the CDP. The population density was 185.1 inhabitants per square mile (71.5/km^{2}). There were 158 housing units at an average density of 59.1 per square mile (22.8/km^{2}). The racial makeup of the CDP was 17.98% White, 0.20% Native American, 33.33% Asian, 10.51% Pacific Islander, 1.01% from other races, and 36.97% from two or more races. Hispanic or Latino of any race were 22.22% of the population.

There were 149 households, out of which 30.9% had children under the age of 18 living with them, 49.0% were married couples living together, 21.5% had a female householder with no husband present, and 23.5% were non-families. 16.8% of all households were made up of individuals, and 7.4% had someone living alone who was 65 years of age or older. The average household size was 3.32 and the average family size was 3.76.

In the CDP the population was spread out, with 27.3% under the age of 18, 8.9% from 18 to 24, 26.3% from 25 to 44, 25.1% from 45 to 64, and 12.5% who were 65 years of age or older. The median age was 35 years. For every 100 females, there were 96.4 males. For every 100 females age 18 and over, there were 93.5 males.

The median income for a household in the CDP was $47,250, and the median income for a family was $50,179. Males had a median income of $23,750 versus $28,056 for females. The per capita income for the CDP was $13,882. About 16.5% of families and 16.8% of the population were below the poverty line, including 22.3% of those under age 18 and 1.5% of those age 65 or over.
