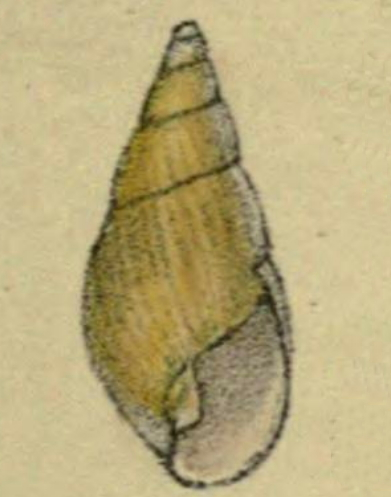
- Shell of Amastra luteola

Scientific classification
- Kingdom: Animalia
- Phylum: Mollusca
- Class: Gastropoda
- Order: Stylommatophora
- Family: Amastridae
- Genus: Amastra
- Species: A. luteola

Binomial name
- Amastra luteola (A. Férussac, 1825)

Synonyms
- Helix luteola A. Férussac, 1825 superseded combination

= Amastra luteola =

Species of mollusc

Amastra luteola is a species of air-breathing land snail, a terrestrial pulmonate gastropod mollusc in the family Amastridae.

== Description ==
The shell is dextral, elongate, and delicately striatulate. Its coloration is white, covered by a transient buff-colored epidermis. <It is composed of 5–6 whorls, the body whorl is only faintly carinate. The suture is simple and not duplicated.

The aperture is ovate-elongate, while the columella is white and gracefully arcuate. The umbilical crevice is indistinct.

== Distribution ==
This species is endemic to Hawaii, occurring on Kohala (mountain).
