= Lapakahi State Historical Park =

Historic Place in Hawaii County, Hawaii

- Lapakahi Complex
- U.S. National Register of Historic Places
- U.S. Historic district
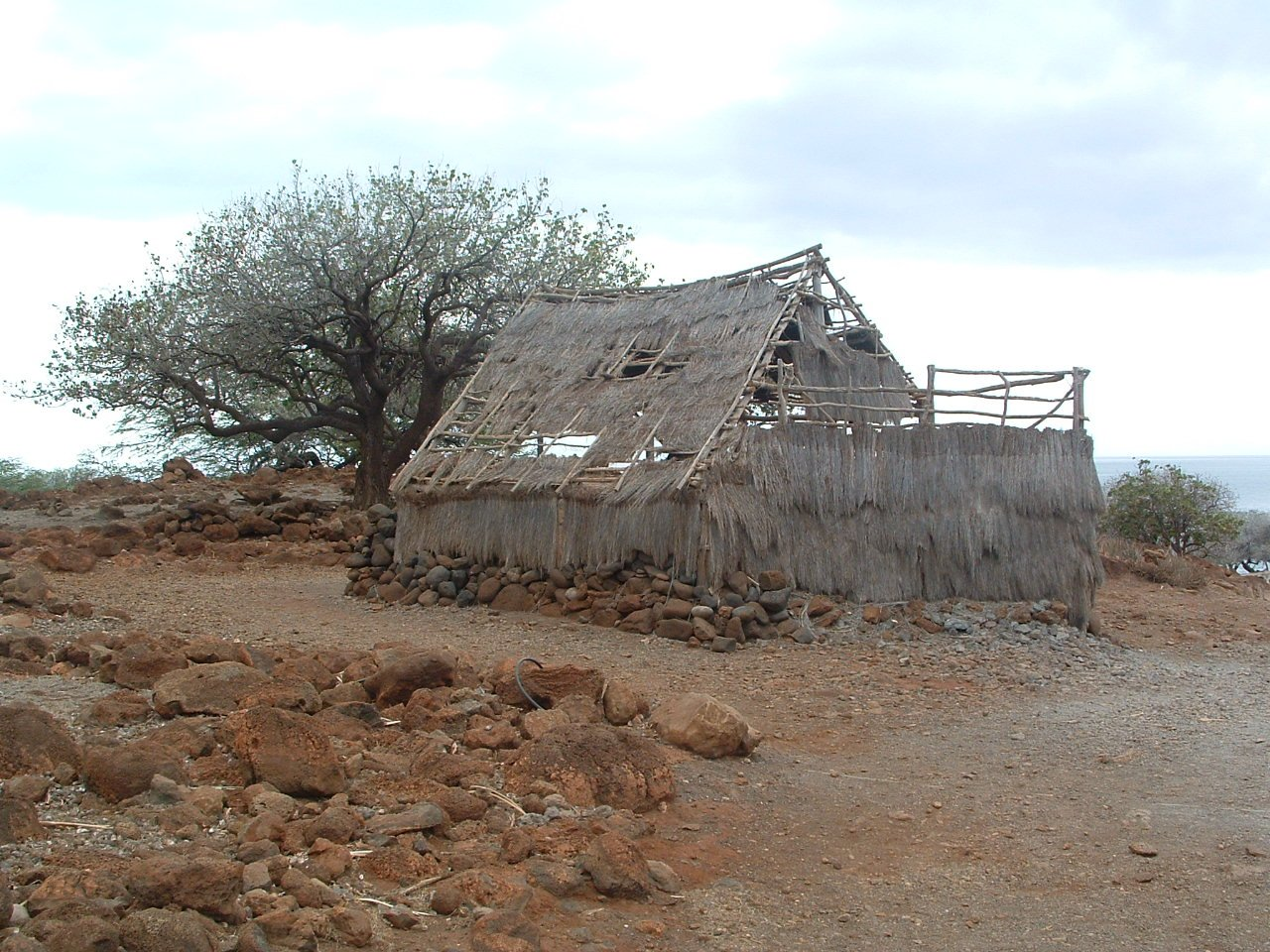

- Location within Hawaii
- Nearest city: Hawi, Hawaii
- Coordinates: 20°10′31″N 155°53′50″W
- Area: 265 acres (107 ha)
- Architectural style: Ancient Hawaiian
- NRHP reference No.: 73000654
- Added to NRHP: July 2, 1973

Lapakahi State Historical Park is a park on the coast of Hawaiʻi in North Kohala District about 12 miles (19 km) north of Kawaihae and can be reached by way of ʻAkoni Pule Highway (Route 270). It occupies an area of 265 acres (107 ha), which includes the ruins of an ancient Hawaiian fishing village named Koai'e dating to the 1300s. Lapa kahi means "single ridge" in the Hawaiian language.

== Flora ==
Plants include the cotton plant maʻo (Gossypium tomentosum), the flowering plants milo (Thespesia populnea) and ‘Ilima (Sida fallax), the shrub Hinahina kahakai (Heliotropium anomalum) and of course the niu (coconut).

== Archaeology ==
Lapakahi Complex was added to the National Register of Historic Places on July 2, 1973, as site 73000654.

The fishing village of Koai'e was established around 1300 and remained occupied until the late 1800s. It has been excavated and partially restored. There are "house and burial sites, C-shaped shelters, and heiaus [temples] built in the traditional Hawaiian manner using dry-laid stone, along with salt pans and ovens."

The people expanded inland and created an ahupuaʻa (an ancient Hawaiian land division) that ran from the sea up to Kohala Mountain.

== Lapakahi Marine Life Conservation District ==
The Lapakahi Marine Life Conservation District extends 500 feet (150 m) out from the shoreline of the park. The shoreline is "mostly rocky lava outcrops with a few coral rubble beaches."

It is a habitat for over 116 species. Humpback whales visit in winter. Fish include the forcepsfish, also known as the yellow longnose butterflyfish, and the yellow tang (Zebrasoma flavescens).

There are coral reefs in Koai'e Cove. One coral is the cauliflower coral (Pocillopora).
