= ʻAkoni Pule Highway =

State highway in Hawaii County, Hawaii, US

Hawaii Route 270
- ʻAkoni Pule Highway
- Route 270 highlighted in red

Route information
- Maintained by HDOT
- Length: 27.003 mi (43.457 km)

Major junctions
- South end: Route 19 near Kawaihae
- North end: Pololū Valley

Location
- Country: United States
- State: Hawaii
- Counties: Hawaii

Highway system
- Routes in Hawaii
← Route 250	→ Route 311

The ʻAkoni Pule Highway, designated Hawaii Route 270, is a state highway in Hawaii County, Hawaii, United States, that is the main road along the North Kohala Coast on the Island of Hawaiʻi from Kawaihae to ʻUpolu Point and then on to Pololū Valley Lookout. The entire route is 27.0 miles (43.5 km) long.

== Route description ==
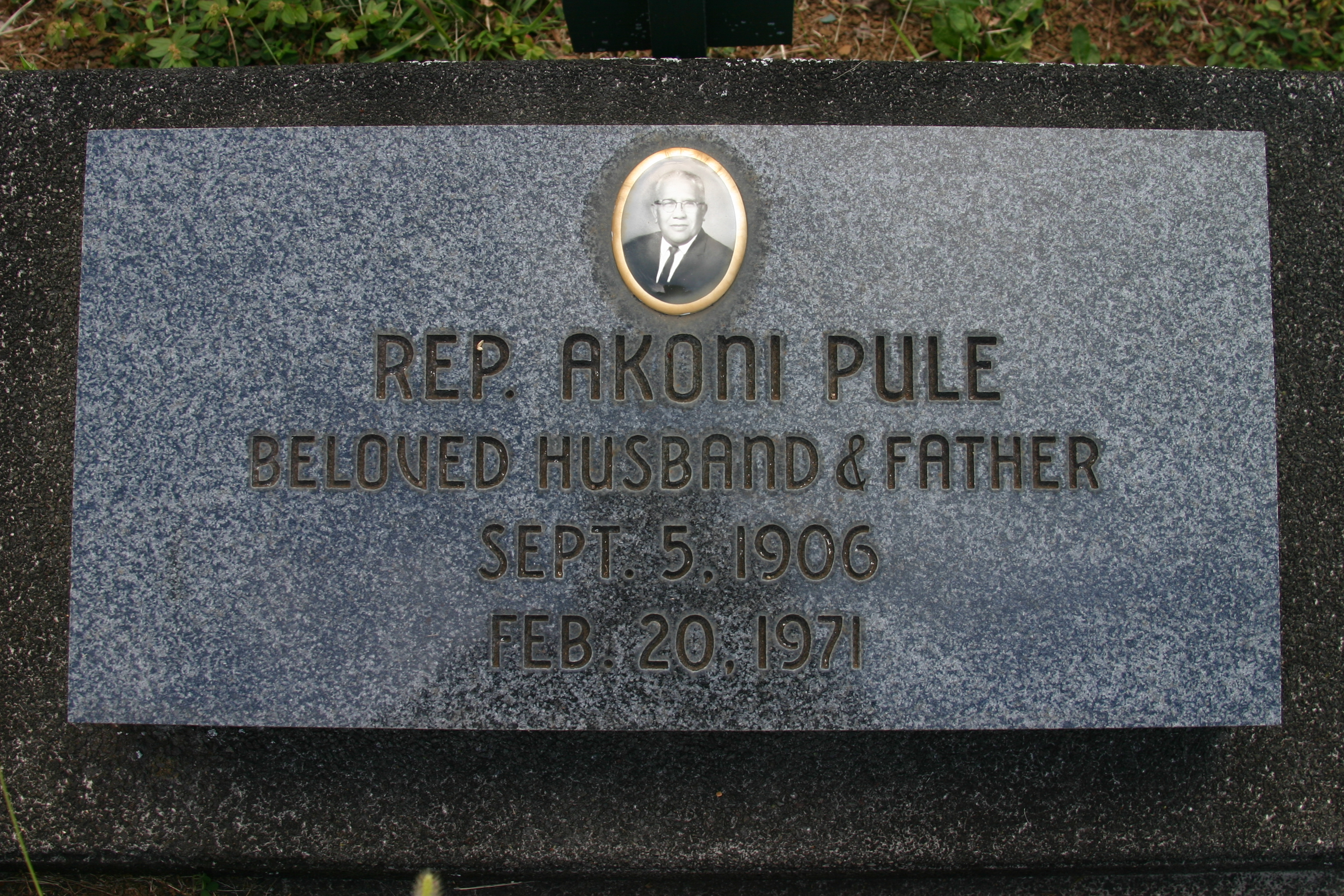
Namesake of ʻAkoni Pule

=== Kawaihae Road ===
Although Kawaihae Road begins in the town of Waimea as part of the Hawaiʻi Belt Road, Route 270 starts at the T junction near mile 67, where Route 19 becomes known as Queen Kaʻahumanu Highway. The first green mile marker on Kawaihae Road is mile 2 just past the "Queen K," with the first two miles (3.2 km) being absorbed into Route 19 when it was reäligned in 1975.

Further south is Samuel M. Spencer Beach Park, a popular spot with a large sandy beach, shaded grassy areas, and picnic tables. Adjacent to the park is Puʻukoholā Heiau National Historic Site, a temple built by Kamehameha I in 1790–91 and dedicated to the war god Kū. Kū was pleased, and allowed Kamehameha I to wage several subsequent battles using Western military strategy and weapons to extend his control over all Hawaiian Islands. Also at this site are the smaller Mailekini Heiau, the submerged Hale o Kapuni Heiau, and home site of John Young.

Passing mile 3, the next feature is the harbor of Kawaihae, built in 1959 as a fuel depot, shipping terminal and military landing site. The small town surrounding the port features a number of restaurants, shops and art galleries, as well as a popular surfing and canoeing spot.

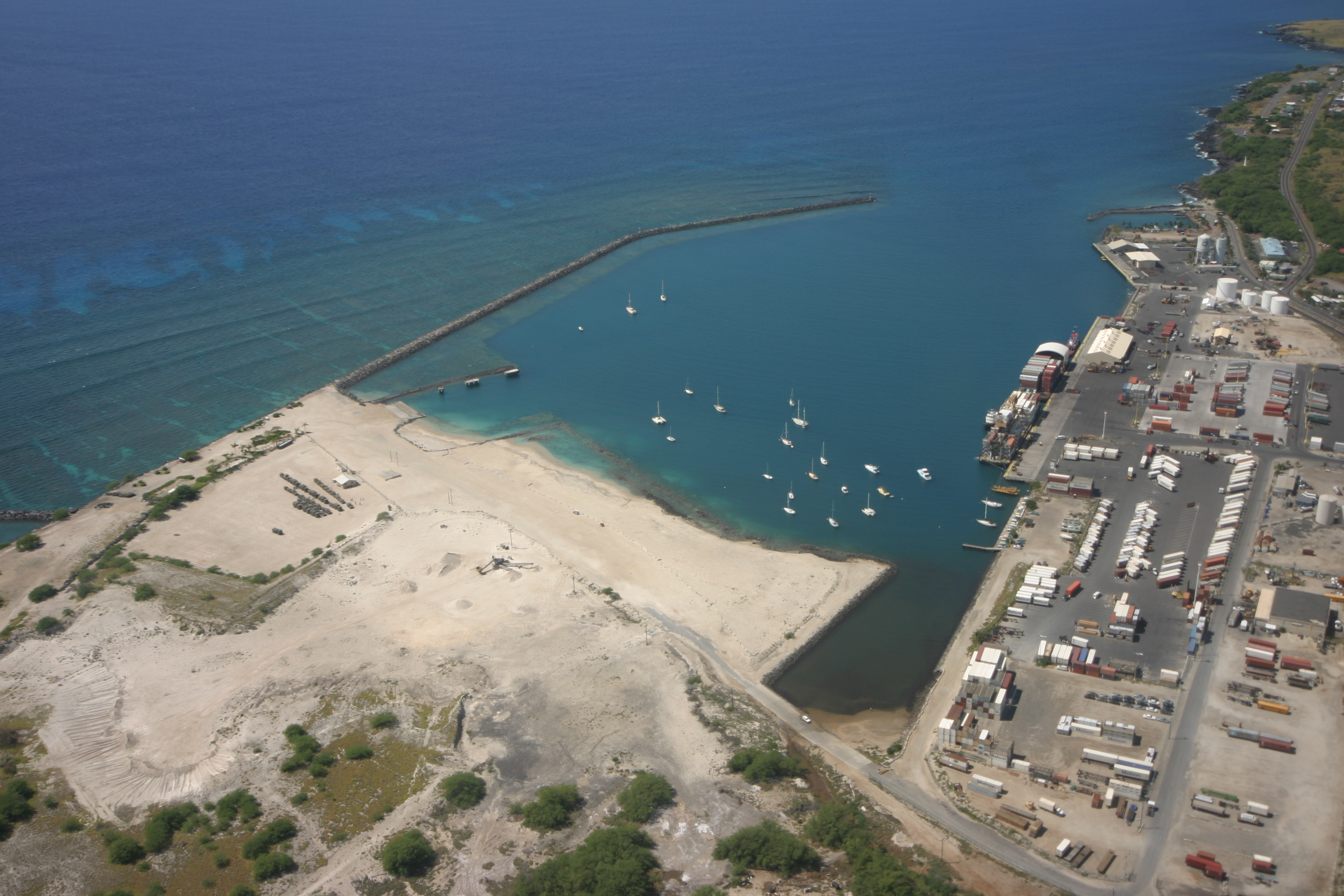
Kawaihae Harbor

Route 270 branches right onto ʻAkoni Pule Highway at the T junction fronting the harbor (Kawaihae Road continues straight on the former Route 269 spur for another 1,000 feet (300 m).

=== ʻAkoni Pule Highway ===
The intersection in Kawaihae marks the beginning of ʻAkoni Pule Highway. It starts as a narrow two-lane street but becomes wider, with higher speeds, past the Kāʻei Hana II industrial park.

The terrain is dry and rocky since this area is in the rain shadow of Mauna Kea and the Kohala Mountains. Average annual rainfall is from 4–7 inches (100–180 mm) and wildfires are not uncommon here. The cobalt color of the Pacific Ocean provides a backdrop for the gated communities of Kohala Ranch and Kohala Waterfront.

ʻAkoni Pule Highway crosses into North Kohala District near mile 6 and continues along the rocky coastline with only an occasional dirt road leading mauka (uphill) into rangelands or makai providing access to favored fishing spots. Just before the mile 14 marker is the entrance to Lapakahi State Historical Park, site of an ancient fishing village that illustrates the traditional land divisions known as ahupuaʻa.

The next point-of-interest is Māhukona Park, an abandoned harbor once used by the adjacent Kohala Sugar Mill. This was also the terminus for the Hawaiian Railroad, a 20-mile (32 km) long, three feet (91 cm) gauge track that brought sugarcane from plantations to waiting steamships. The waters are clear and perfect for snorkeling around discarded mill equipment and even a shipwreck.

As ʻAkoni Pule Highway begins a long, sweeping right curve near mile 15, it moves away from the coast and the landscape takes on a different character: the grass is greener, the trees become more abundant, and the air is cooler as the trade winds are able to bring more precipitation to this area.

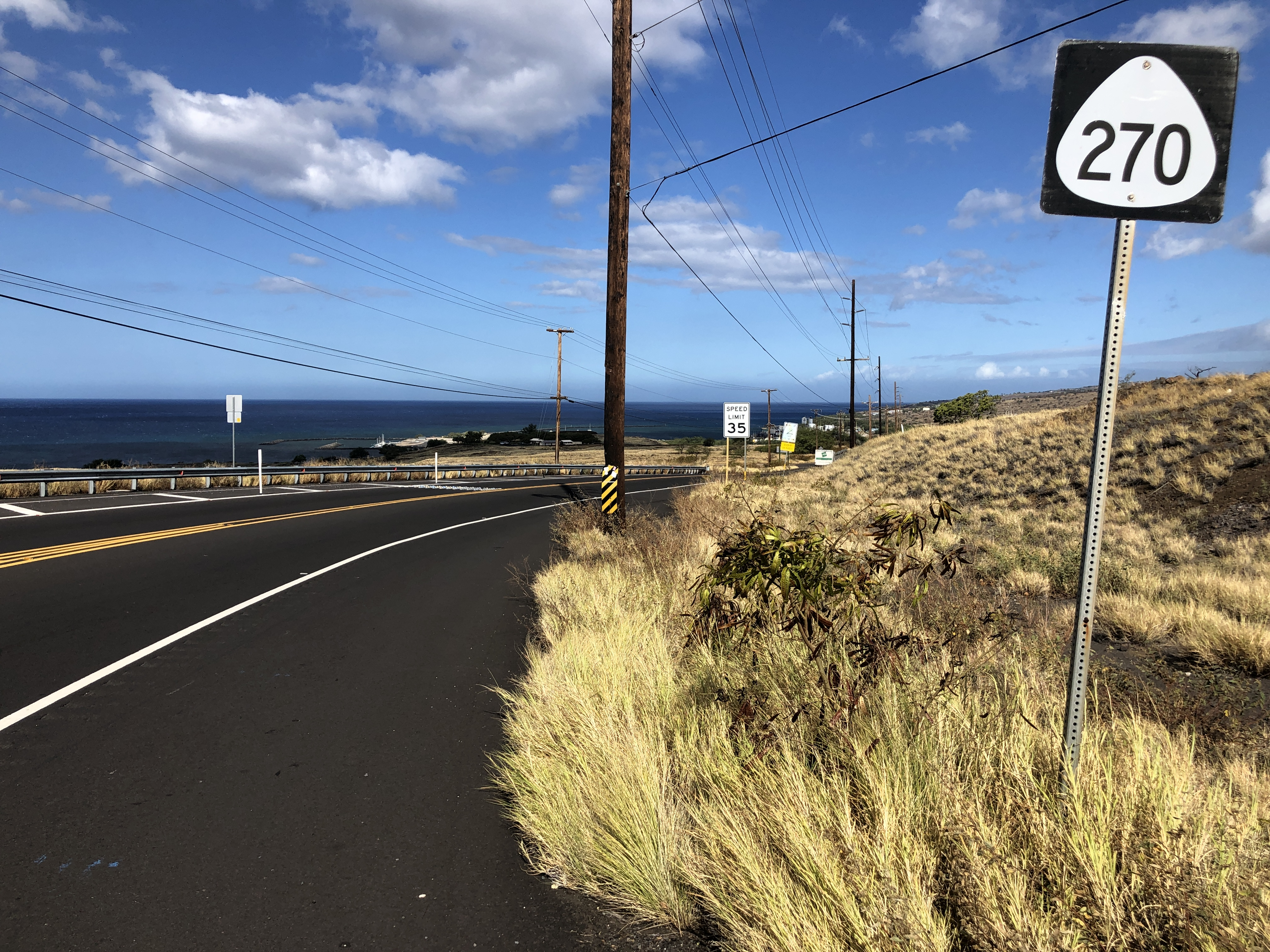
Route 270 northbound at Route 19 in Waikui

It is highly recommended that drivers strictly adhere to the speed limit signs in North Kohala. With a low crime rate the police have more time to attend to traffic violations.

Across from the mile 20 marker is ʻUpolu Point (Airport) Road which leads to ʻUpolu Airport and provides access (via a rough unpaved Four-wheel drive road) to Moʻokini Heiau and the birthplace of Kamehameha I in the Kohala Historical Sites State Monument.

The small town of Hāwī centers on the crossroads of Hāwī Road (Route 250) and ʻAkoni Pule Highway just beyond mile 21. This area was home to thousands of people in the early 20th century. No less than 56 general stores, owned and operated by first-generation Asian immigrants, were established in the vicinity and a handful of these businesses still are in operation. The entire highway to this point is used for the bicycle leg of the Ironman World Championship Triathlon. At this junction the athletes turn around and return to the finish line at Kamakahonu in Kailua-Kona.

Since there are no public roads past Kynnersley Road that connect to the rest of Hawaiʻi Island, Route 270 becomes, in a sense, a 6.5-mile-long (10.5 km) cul-de-sac. A short drive further down ʻAkoni Pule Highway is Kapaʻau. Many public services are based here, including police and fire stations, a hospital, schools and a civic center. In front of the latter stands the original Statue of King Kamehameha the Great that was once lost in a shipwreck off South America in 1880 but then recovered and sent to Kapaʻau 32 years later.

The road resembles a country lane more than a highway as it passes the former plantation camps that dot the North Kohala Coast. There are three one-lane bridges: two cross gulches midway through the horseshoe curves and the other at mile 26. Caution needs to be observed and obey the yield signs. A county park with a picnic pavilion and a gazebo overlooks Kēōkea Bay at the end of Kēōkea Beach Road.

At mile 28.9, the ʻAkoni Pule Highway comes to an abrupt end at the Pololū Valley Scenic Point. It is a tight turnaround on a downhill slope with a lot of foot traffic so caution is advised. There is a small parking area here but respect the kapu signs on the adjacent private properties. The trailhead to Pololū is at the end of the asphalt.

== History ==
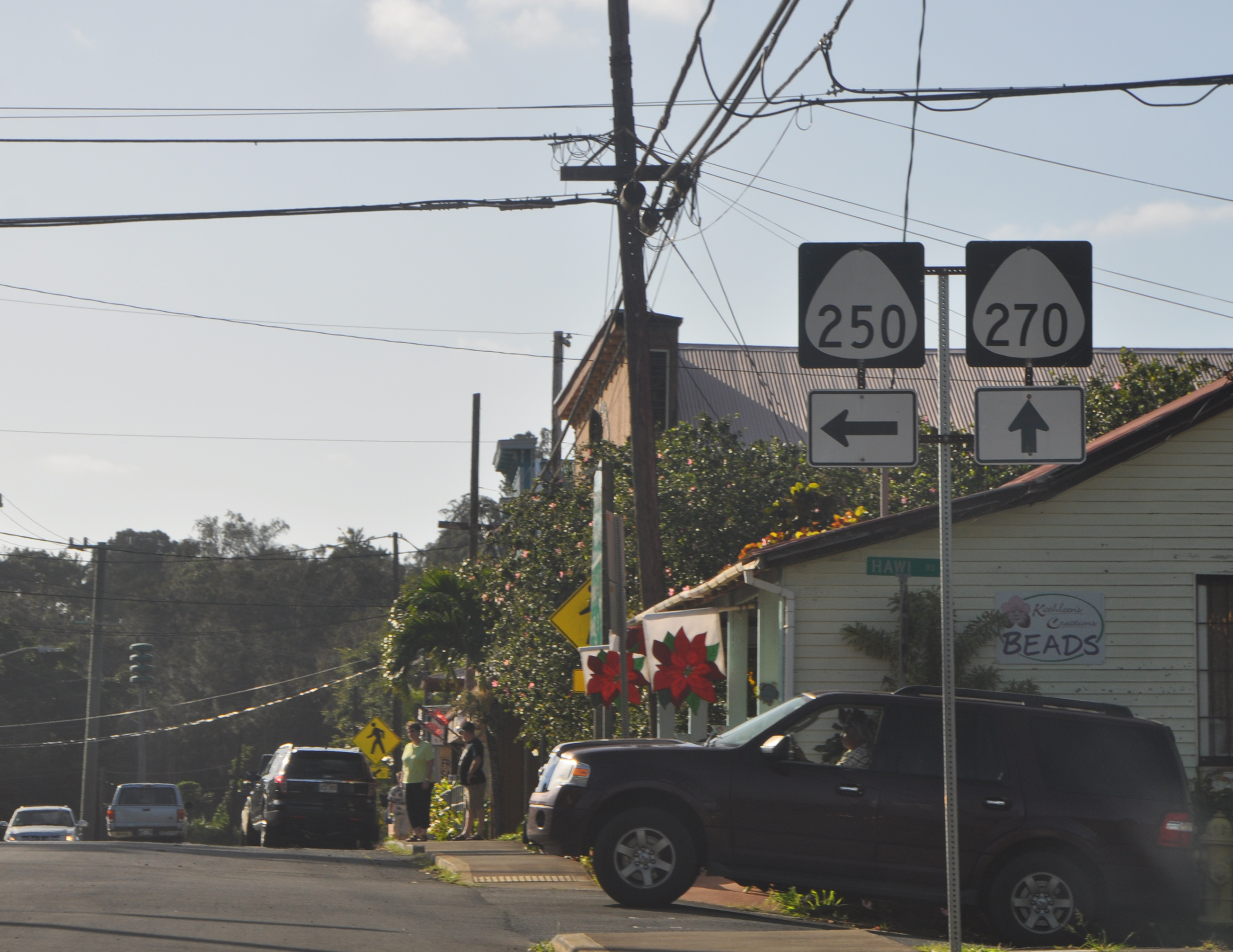
The signs of Hawaiian State Routes 250 and 270, in Hawi, Hawaii

Prior to the 1970s, the only means of driving to North Kohala District was along the winding, narrow Kohala Mountain Road (then Route 25, now 250). The Hawaiʻi Department of Transportation already had plans for a coastal Route 11 along the Kohala Peninsula in the early-1960s to connect with Routes 25 and 27 in Hāwī. However, about the only action taken over the next ten years was the reässignment of highway shield numbers and assigning number 270 to the proposed highway.

ʻAkoni Pule (1906–1971), the State legislator who represented North Kohala from 1947 to 1965, pushed for a safer alternative to Kohala Mountain Road and a second access to the towns of Hāwī and Kapaʻau. He was also instrumental in providing the necessary state and federal funds to complete construction. The new road was dedicated in his honor in July 1973.

== Major junctions ==
The entire route is in Hawaii County.

Location	mi	km	Destinations	Notes
Kawaihae	0.000	0.000	Route 19 – Kailua, Waimea	Southern terminus
Hawi	19.4	31.2	Route 250 south – Waimea	Northern terminus of Route 250
	27.003	43.457	Awini Trail	Northern terminus
1.000 mi = 1.609 km; 1.000 km = 0.621 mi

== See also ==
- List of state highways in Hawaii
- List of highways numbered 270
