= ʻUpolu Airport =

ʻUpolu Airport Kahua Mokulele o ʻUpolu
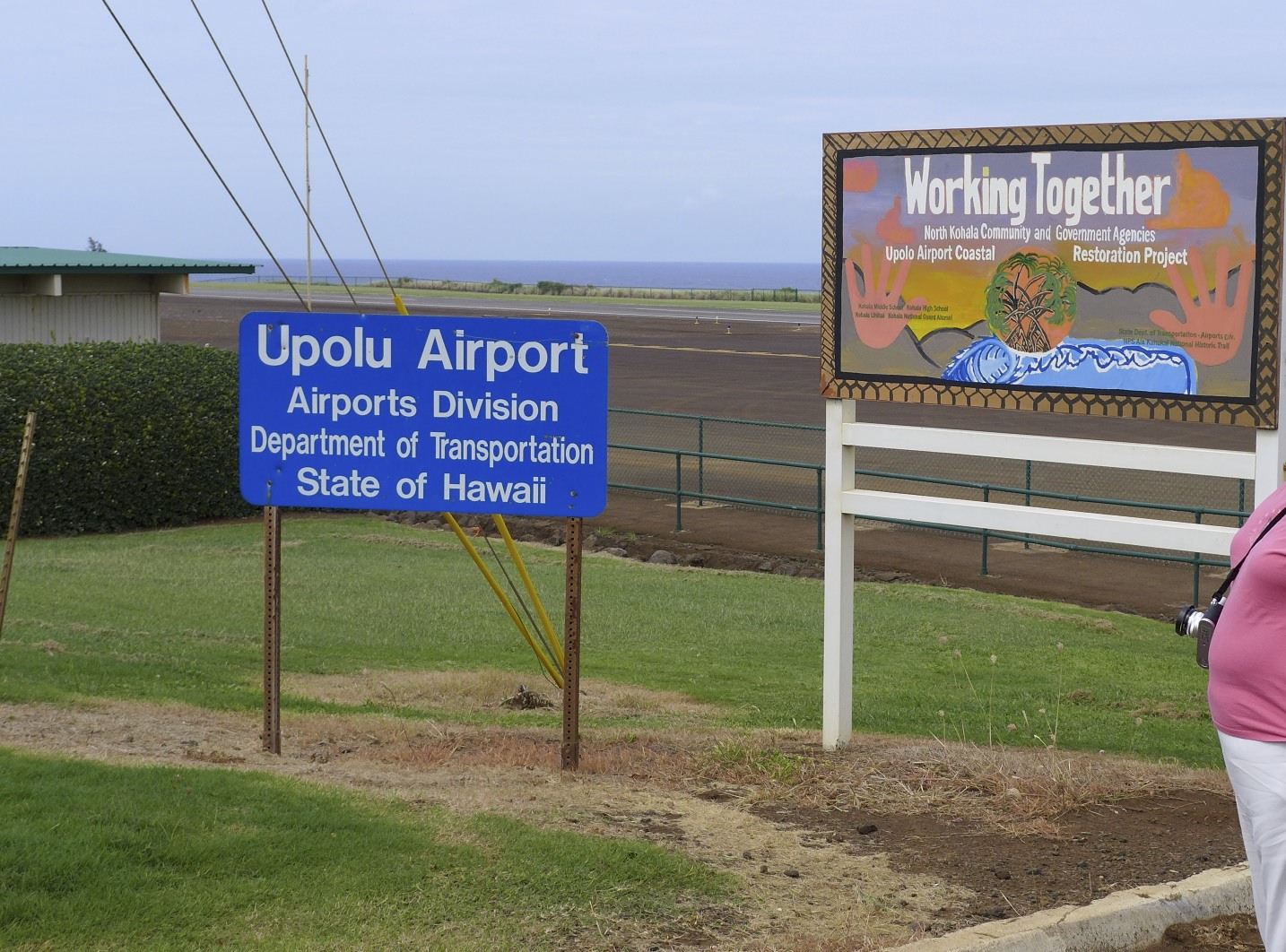
- IATA: UPP; ICAO: PHUP; FAA LID: UPP

Summary
- Airport type: Public
- Owner/Operator: Hawaii Department of Transportation
- Location: Hawi, Hawaii
- Elevation AMSL: 96 ft / 29 m
- Coordinates: 20°15′55″N 155°51′36″W
- Website: hawaii.gov/upp

Map

Runways
Direction	Length		Surface
Direction	ft	m	Surface
7/25	3,800	1,158	Asphalt

Statistics (2008)
- Aircraft operations: 790
- Source: Federal Aviation Administration

ʻUpolu Airport (IATA: UPP, ICAO: PHUP, FAA LID: UPP) is a regional airport in Hawaii County, Hawaii, US. Located on the northern tip of the Big Island, it is 3 nautical miles (5.6 km; 3.5 mi) northwest of the unincorporated town of Hawi.

It is included in the Federal Aviation Administration (FAA) National Plan of Integrated Airport Systems for 2017–2021, in which it is categorized as a general aviation facility.

== History ==
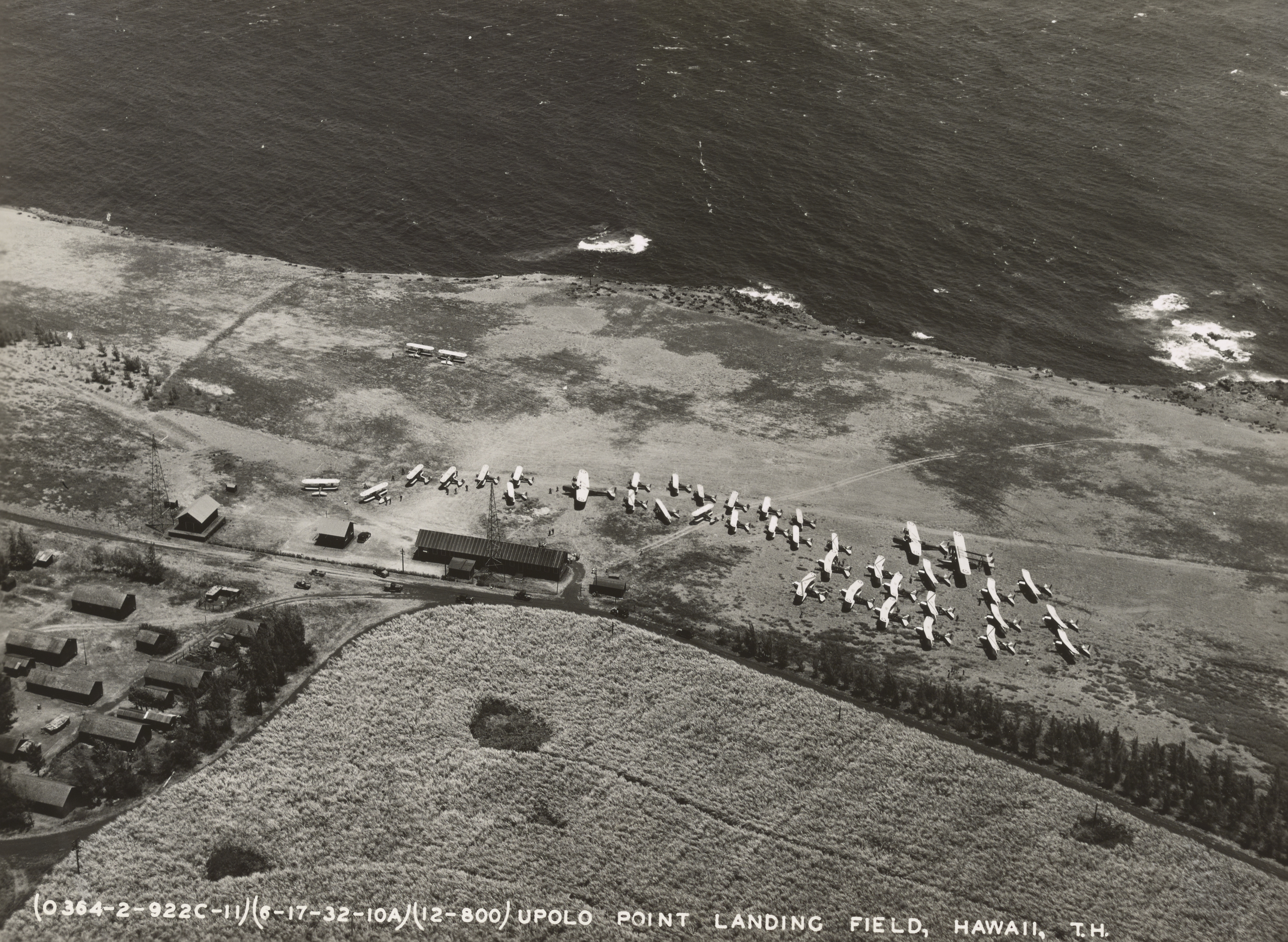
Upolu Airport in 1933

Upolu Airport was built in 1927 for the United States Air Service to be under the control and management of the War Department. The land had previously been deeded to the Territory of Hawaii by the Hawaii Mill and Plantation Company. In 1933, the airfield was named "Suiter Field" by the U.S. Army in honor of 1st Lieutenant Wilbur C. Suiter of the 135th Aero Squadron. On September 18, 1930, Governor's Executive Order No. 432 combined Territory of Hawaii land with the Suiter Field land to establish a territorial airport to be known as Upolu Airport.

== Facilities and aircraft ==
As a general aviation airport, Upolu Airport has a single runway without taxiways and two aircraft parking areas south of the runway. The east parking area supports passenger terminal operations and the west parking area provides tie down facilities for general aviation aircraft. The airport does not have a control tower, aircraft rescue and fire fighting facilities, or discrete air cargo facilities. Access to the airport is provided by a roadway off Akoni Pule Highway. In the event of increased air traffic, the Hawai'i State Legislature has made preliminary plans to build a parallel taxiway south of the runway and to move the existing terminal facilities farther from the runway to provide improved clearances and additional aircraft parking.

The airport covers an area of 82 acres (33 ha) at an elevation of 96 feet (29 m) above mean sea level. It has one runway designated 7/25 with an asphalt surface measuring 3,800 by 75 feet (1,158 × 23 m). For the 12-month period ending December 31, 2008, the airport had 790 aircraft operations, an average of 65 per month: 89% general aviation, 10% military and 1% air taxi.

== Authority ==
Upolu Airport is part of a centralized state structure governing all of the airports and seaports of Hawai'i. The official authority of Upolu Airport is the Governor of Hawai'i who appoints the director of the Hawai'i State Department of Transportation who has jurisdiction over the Hawai'i Airports Administrator.

The Hawai'i Airports Administrator oversees six governing bodies: Airports Operations Office, Airports Planning Office, Engineering Branch, Information Technology Office, Staff Services Office and Visitor Information Program Office. Collectively, the six bodies have authority over the four airport districts in Hawai'i: Hawai'i District, Kaua'i District, Mau'i District and the principal O'ahu District. Upolu Airport is a subordinate of the Hawai'i District officials.

== See also ==
- List of airports in Hawaii
