= Hawaii Route 240 =

State highway in Hawaii County, Hawaii, US

Hawaii Route 240
- Honokaʻa–Waipiʻo Road

Route information
- Maintained by HDOT
- Length: 9.6 mi (15.4 km)

Major junctions
- West end: Waipio Valley Road
- East end: Route 19 southeast of Honokaa

Location
- Country: United States
- State: Hawaii
- Counties: Hawaii

Highway system
- Routes in Hawaii
← Route 220	→ Route 250

Hawaii Route 240, known as the Honokaʻa–Waipiʻo Road, is a state highway in Hawaii County, Hawaii, United States.

== Route description ==
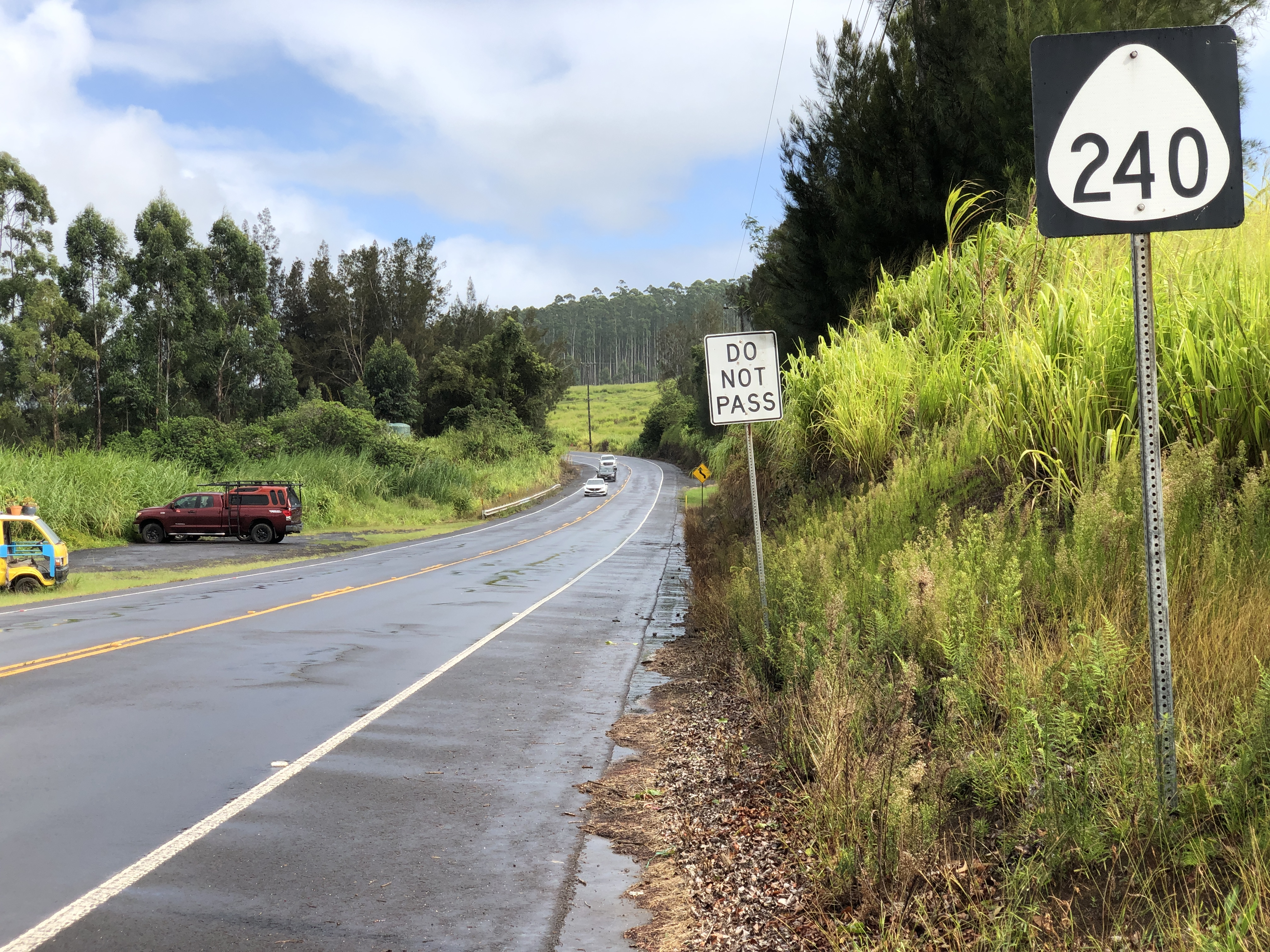
Route 240 eastbound

The highway is located on the island of Hawaii, and travels from southeast of the city of Honokaa northwest to Waimanu Natural Estuarine Research Reserve, on the coast of the island. The highway connects the settlement located by the Reserve to the main highway, Hawaii Route 19.

== Major intersections ==
The entire route is in Hawaii County.

Location	mi	km	Destinations	Notes
Waimanu Natural Estuarine Research Reserve	0.0	0.0	Waipio Valley Road	Western terminus
	9.6	15.4	Route 19 (Mamalahoa Highway)	Eastern terminus
1.000 mi = 1.609 km; 1.000 km = 0.621 mi
