= Māhukona =

Submerged shield volcano on the northwestern flank of the Island of Hawaiʻi

- Location within Hawaii

Highest point
- Elevation: −3,770 feet (−1,150 m)
- Coordinates: 20°01′N 156°01′W

Geography
- Location: Hawaii, US
- Parent range: Hawaiian Islands
- Topo map: USGS Kamuela

Geology
- Mountain type: Shield volcano
- Volcanic zone: Hawaiian-Emperor seamount chain
- Last eruption: About 470,000 BP

Māhukona is a submerged shield volcano on the northwestern flank of the Island of Hawaiʻi. A drowned coral reef at about 3,770 feet (1,150 m) below sea level and a major break in slope at about 4,400 feet (1,300 m) below sea level represent old shorelines.

A roughly circular caldera marks its summit. A prominent rift zone extends to the west. A second rift zone probably extended to the east but has been buried by younger volcanoes.

The main shield-building stage of volcanism ended about 470,000 years ago. The summit of the shield volcano was once 800 feet (250 m) above sea level, but subsided below sea level between 435,000 and 365,000 years ago.

Māhukona is the oldest volcano to build Hawaiʻi island, older than Kohala and Mauna Kea.

The Monterey Bay Aquarium Research Institute investigated the area with a remotely controlled submarine in 2001.

It was named for the area known as Māhukona, on the shore to the northeast.
