= Pololū Valley =

Valley on the north shore of the island of Hawai'i

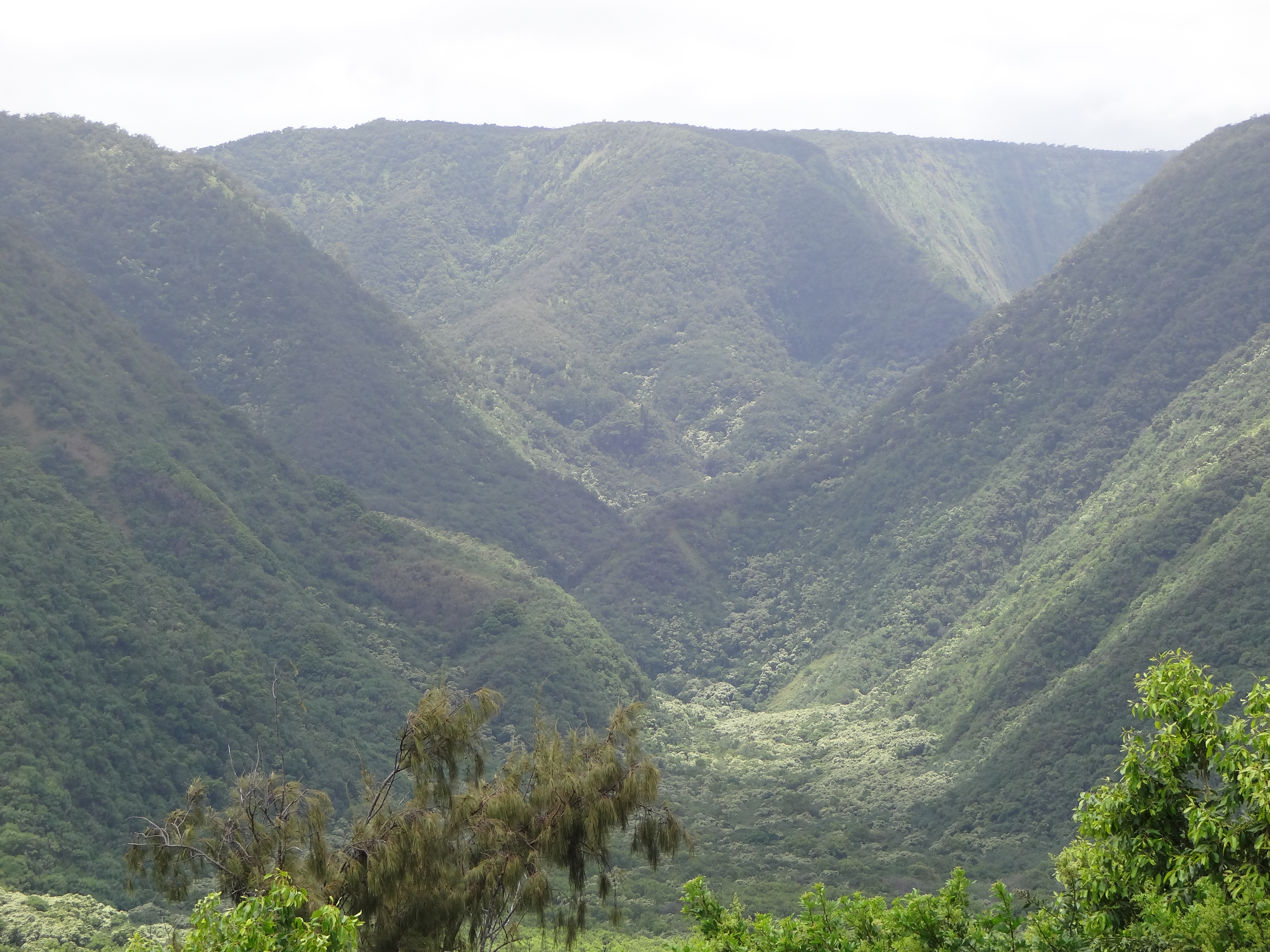
Looking south into the Pololū Valley from the Pololū Valley Lookout, Island of Hawaii

Pololū (Hawaiian spelling: Pololū, stressed on the final 'ū') is the northernmost of a series of erosional valleys forming the east coast of Kohala Mountain on the Island of Hawaiʻi. The word pololū means "long spear" in the Hawaiian language.

== Features ==
The valley forms a deep cut in the side of Kohala Mountain, and is traversed in its entirety by Pololū stream. The upper (southern) end of the valley is located at coordinates 20°9′3″N 155°44′39″W. Hiking trails criss-cross the valley, and lead in and out. The valley is fronted on the ocean side by a beautiful black sand beach. A yellow sand dune protects verdant areas inland from the occasional fury of the ocean.

== History ==
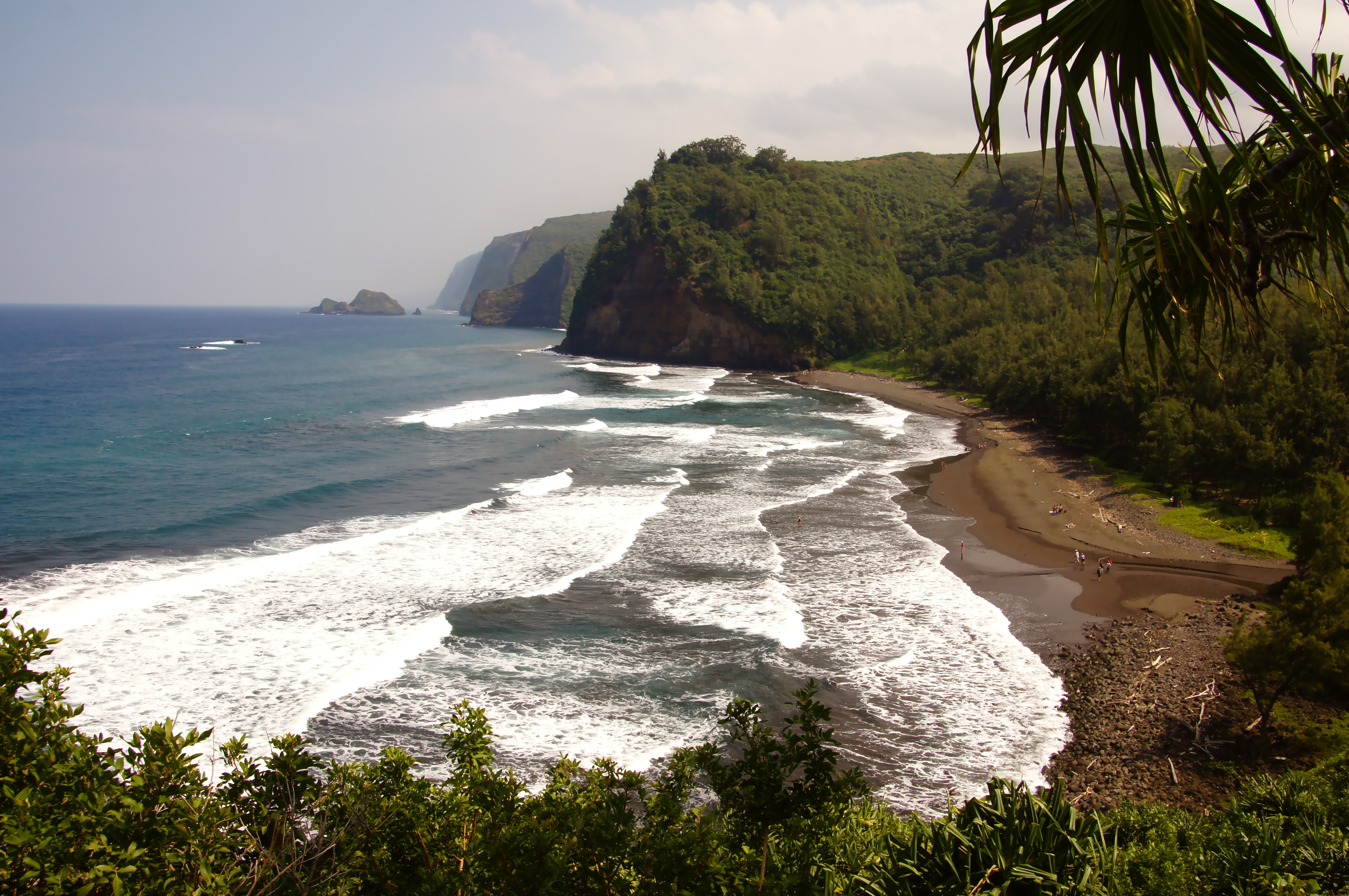
View of Pololu Beach from along the 15-20 minute trail through thick shady foliage.

Prior to European colonization, Pololū Valley was renowned for its kalo (taro) farming. A particular variety of kalo (kalo Pololū) was grown here, notable for its crimson stems. Kalo farming was complemented by rice in the 1800s. In the 20th century, though, the valley fell into disuse. A section of the Kohala ditch, which diverts water from Honokane Valley to the sugarcane fields of the North Kohala district, run along the sides of Pololū Valley. Hikes to and in the ditch are offered by a tour company.

== Transportation ==
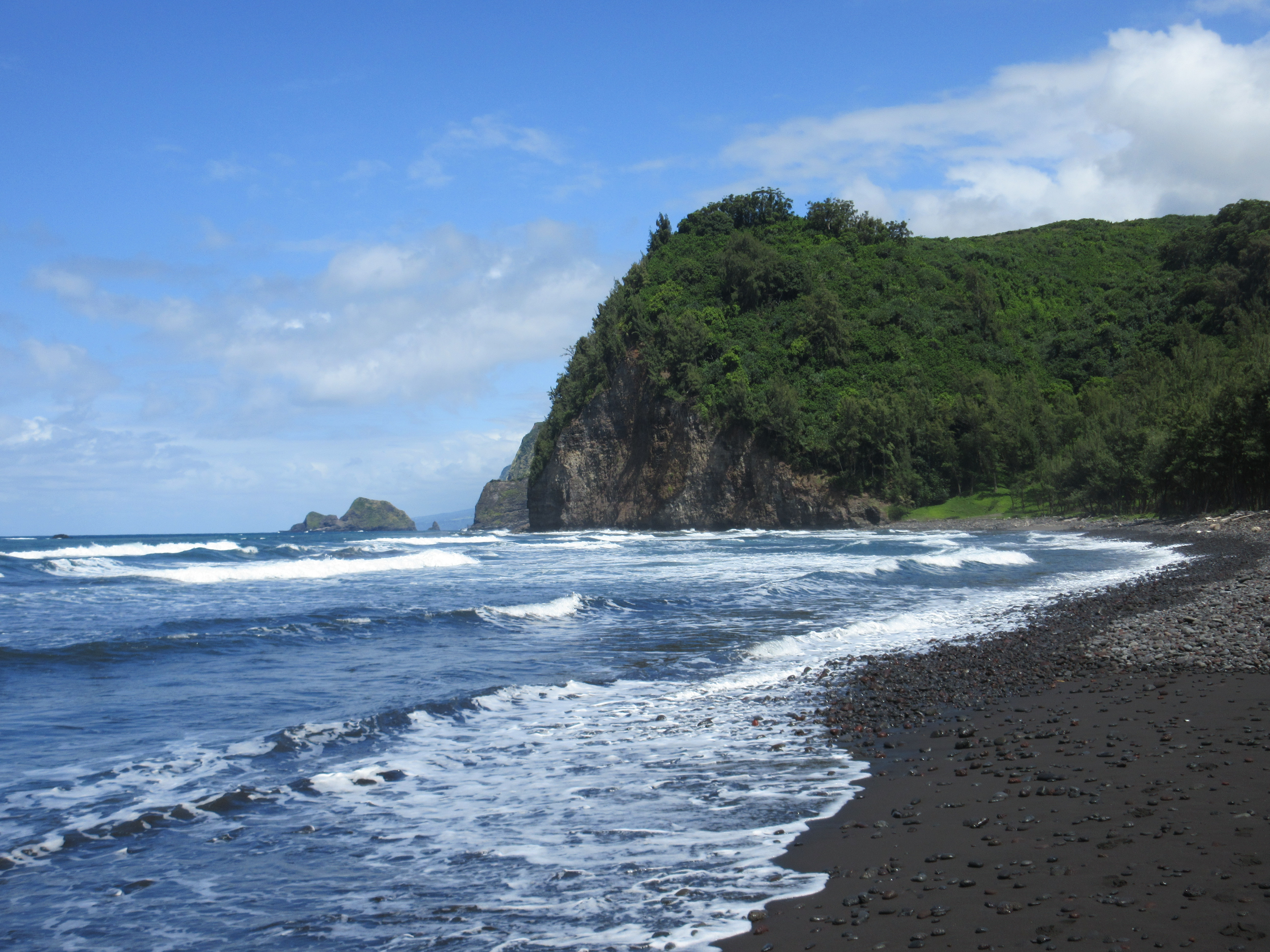
Pololu Beach from the end of the trail.

Pololū Valley is accessed from the North, from a lookout at mile 28 at the end of highway 270 (forming the terminus of Akoni Pule Highway) at coordinates 20°12′13″N 155°44′1″W. A relatively short hike on a graded trail leads to the bottom of the valley. The trail continues beyond the valley, climbing over a ridge to neighboring Honokane Nui Valley.
