= Kapaʻau, Hawaii =

Unincorporated community in Hawaii, U.S.

Kapaʻau
- Census-designated place
- Location in Hawaiʻi County and the state of Hawaii
- Coordinates: 20°14′5″N 155°48′23″W
- Country: United States
- State: Hawaii
- County: Hawaiʻi

Area
  - Total: 6.19 sq mi (16.02 km^{2})
  - Land: 6.18 sq mi (16.00 km^{2})
  - Water: 0.0077 sq mi (0.02 km^{2})
- Elevation: 407 ft (124 m)

Population (2020)
  - Total: 2,008
  - Density: 325.1/sq mi (125.52/km^{2})
- Time zone: UTC-10 (Hawaii-Aleutian)
- ZIP code: 96755
- Area code: 808
- FIPS code: 15-29000
- GNIS feature ID: 0360474

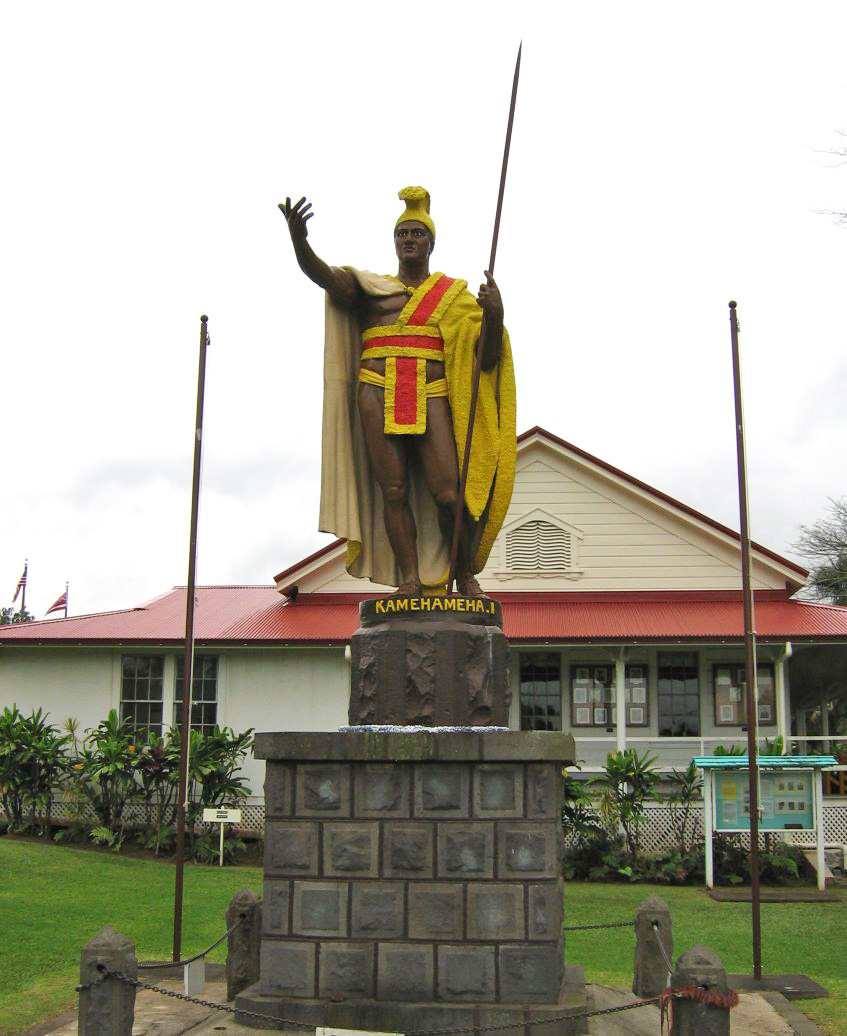
Kamehameha I statue in front of Kapaʻau community center

Kapaʻau is an unincorporated community in Hawaiʻi County, Hawaii, United States. Located at the northern tip of the big island of Hawaiʻi, it is celebrated as the birthplace of Kamehameha I.

For statistical purposes, the United States Census Bureau has defined Kapaʻau as a census-designated place (CDP). The census definition of the area may not precisely correspond to local understanding of the area with the same name. The population was 1,734 at the 2010 census, up from 1,159 at the 2000 census.

== Geography ==
Kapaʻau in the North Kohala District of Hawaiʻi County. It is bordered to the east by Halaʻula, and Hāwī is 2 miles (3 km) to the west. Hawaii Route 270 is the main road through the community.

According to the United States Census Bureau, the Kapaʻau CDP has a total area of 2.9 square miles (7.4 km^{2}), of which 74,630 square feet (6,933 m^{2}), or 0.09%, are water.

== Demographics ==
Historical population
| Census | Pop. | Note | %± |
|---|---|---|---|
| 2020 | 2,008 | | — |
U.S. Decennial Census

As of the census of 2000, there were 1,159 people, 405 households, and 270 families residing in the CDP. The population density was 536.1 inhabitants per square mile (207.0/km^{2}). There were 443 housing units at an average density of 204.9 units per square mile (79.1 units/km^{2}). The racial makeup of the CDP was 23.47% White, 0.09% African American, 0.09% Native American, 27.44% Asian, 9.32% Pacific Islander, 1.73% from other races, and 37.88% from two or more races. Hispanic or Latino of any race were 16.65% of the population.

There were 405 households, out of which 28.6% had children under the age of 18 living with them, 50.6% were married couples living together, 11.6% had a female householder with no husband present, and 33.3% were non-families. 26.2% of all households were made up of individuals, and 17.3% had someone living alone who was 65 years of age or older. The average household size was 2.81 and the average family size was 3.48.

In the CDP the population was spread out, with 27.1% under the age of 18, 7.0% from 18 to 24, 22.3% from 25 to 44, 24.4% from 45 to 64, and 19.2% who were 65 years of age or older. The median age was 40 years. For every 100 females, there were 94.5 males. For every 100 females age 18 and over, there were 93.4 males.

The median income for a household in the CDP was $45,764, and the median income for a family was $50,703. Males had a median income of $30,694 versus $28,021 for females. The per capita income for the CDP was $17,131. About 4.7% of families and 7.8% of the population were below the poverty line, including 9.8% of those under age 18 and 6.8% of those age 65 or over.

== Points of interest ==
The King Kamehameha Statue was cast in 1888, lost at sea, and then recovered and erected at Kapa'au. His actual birthplace was a few miles away in the Kohala Historical Sites State Monument, a remote area not easily accessible. June 11 is the state holiday Kamehameha Day, celebrated by a parade through the town.

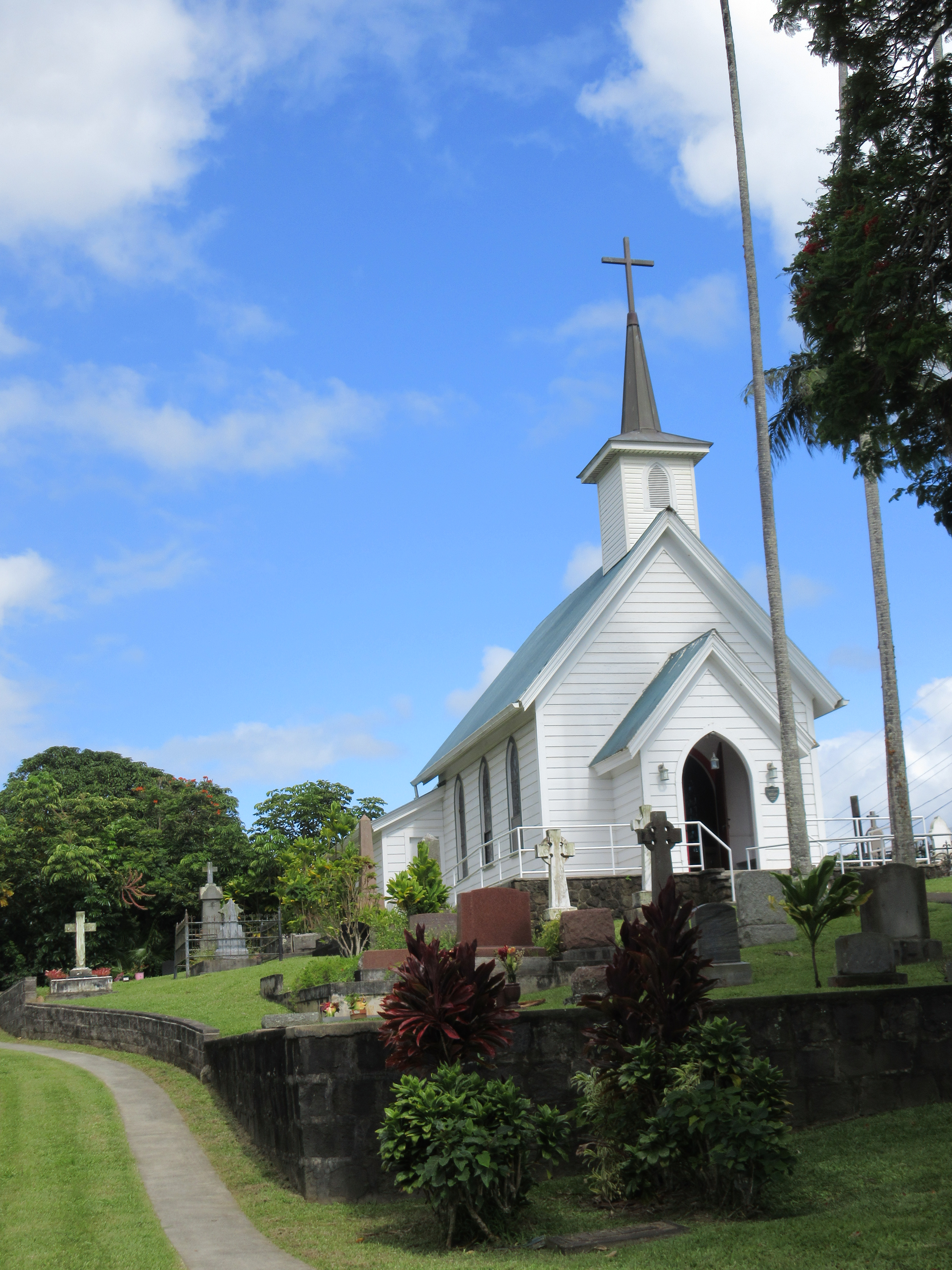
St. Augustine's Episcopal Church was completed in 1884.

The Kauhola Point Lighthouse was on the coast about 3 miles (5 km) northeast of the town.

== Education ==
The statewide school district is the Hawaii State Department of Education, and it covers Hawaii County. Kohala High School, Kohala Middle School, and Kohala Elementary School are located in Kapa'au and serve students in grades K-12.

The Hawaii State Public Library System operates the North Kohala Public Library.
