= Hāwī, Hawaii =

Census-designated place in Hawaii, United States

Hāwī
- Census-designated place
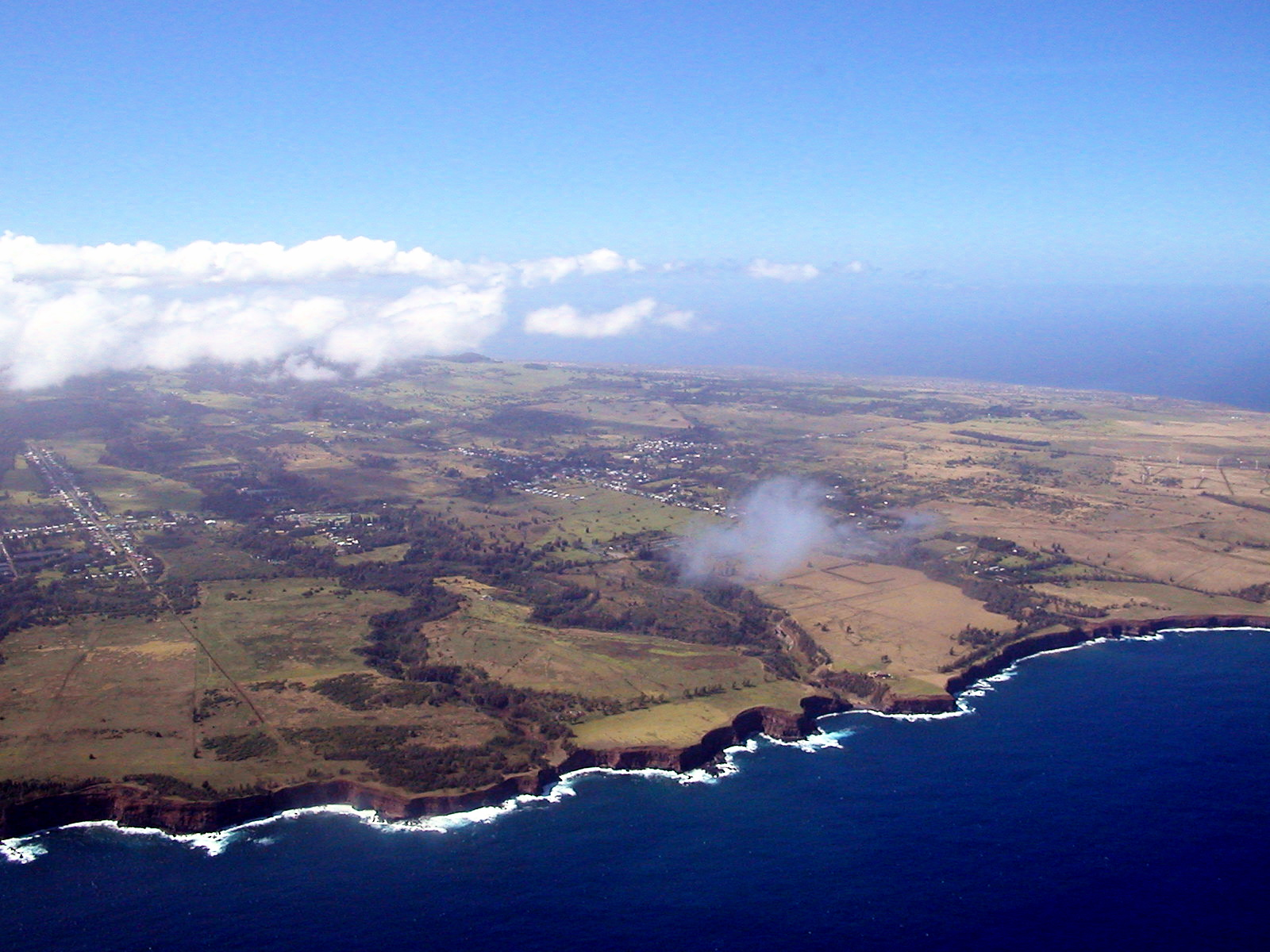
- Aerial view of Hawi and the surrounding North Kohala region

- Location in Hawaiʻi County and the state of Hawaii
- Coordinates: 20°14′31″N 155°50′2″W
- Country: United States
- State: Hawaii
- County: Hawaiʻi

Area
  - Total: 8.11 sq mi (21.00 km^{2})
  - Land: 8.10 sq mi (20.98 km^{2})
  - Water: 0.0077 sq mi (0.02 km^{2})
- Elevation: 522 ft (159 m)

Population (2020)
  - Total: 2,268
  - Density: 280.0/sq mi (108.09/km^{2})
- Time zone: UTC-10 (Hawaii-Aleutian)
- ZIP code: 96719
- Area code: 808
- FIPS code: 15-13600
- GNIS feature ID: 0359139

Hāwī (Hawaiian pronunciation: [haː'viː]) is a census-designated place (CDP) in Hawaiʻi County, Hawaii. The population was 2,268 at the time of the 2020 United States census.

Hāwī is situated to the west of the community of Kapaau. Together, they comprise the most densely populated region in the district of North Kohala. Historically this part of Kohala is significant as the birthplace of Kamehameha I and the location of the Moʻokini heiau in the Kohala Historical Sites State Monument. The two communities were once busy commercial centers during the operation of the Kohala Sugar plantation.

Hāwī is the turnaround point for the Ironman World Championship Triathlon. It is the northernmost point on the bicycle leg, where athletes return to the finish line at Kamakahonu in Kailua-Kona.

== Geography ==
Hāwī is located at 20°14′31″N 155°50′2″W (20.241917, -155.834013).

According to the United States Census Bureau, the CDP has a total area of 1.2 square miles (3.1 km^{2}), all of it land. The climate of the city is tropical, with temperatures staying between the 60s and 80s in all seasons.

== Demographics ==
Historical population
| Census | Pop. | Note | %± |
|---|---|---|---|
| 2020 | 2,268 | | — |
U.S. Decennial Census

=== 2000 Census data ===
As of the census of 2000, there were 938 people, 298 households, and 224 families residing in the CDP. The population density was 773.1 inhabitants per square mile (298.5/km^{2}). There were 333 housing units at an average density of 274.4 units per square mile (105.9 units/km^{2}). The racial makeup of the CDP was 21.22% White, 0.32% African American, 0.21% Native American, 27.08% Asian, 11.19% Pacific Islander, 0.53% from other races, and 39.45% from two or more races. Hispanic or Latino of any race were 10.02% of the population.

There were 298 households, out of which 34.9% had children under the age of 18 living with them, 51.3% were married couples living together, 17.8% had a female householder with no husband present, and 24.5% were non-families. 19.5% of all households were made up of individuals, and 7.7% had someone living alone who was 65 years of age or older. The average household size was 3.15 and the average family size was 3.63.

In the CDP the population dispersal was 28.0% under the age of 18, 8.3% from 18 to 24, 26.1% from 25 to 44, 25.1% from 45 to 64, and 12.5% who were 65 years of age or older. The median age was 38 years. For every 100 females, there were 103.5 males. For every 100 females age 18 and over, there were 95.7 males.

The median income for a household in the CDP was $46,406, and the median income for a family was $51,364. Males had a median income of $30,491 versus $27,321 for females. The per capita income for the CDP was $16,755. About 7.1% of families and 8.7% of the population were below the poverty line, including 9.2% of those under age 18 and 10.9% of those age 65 or over.

== Notable people ==
- John Keawe, slack key guitar player
- Stephen C. Stearns, biologist
- Napua Stevens, dancer, singer, teacher, media personality, and author

== Gallery ==
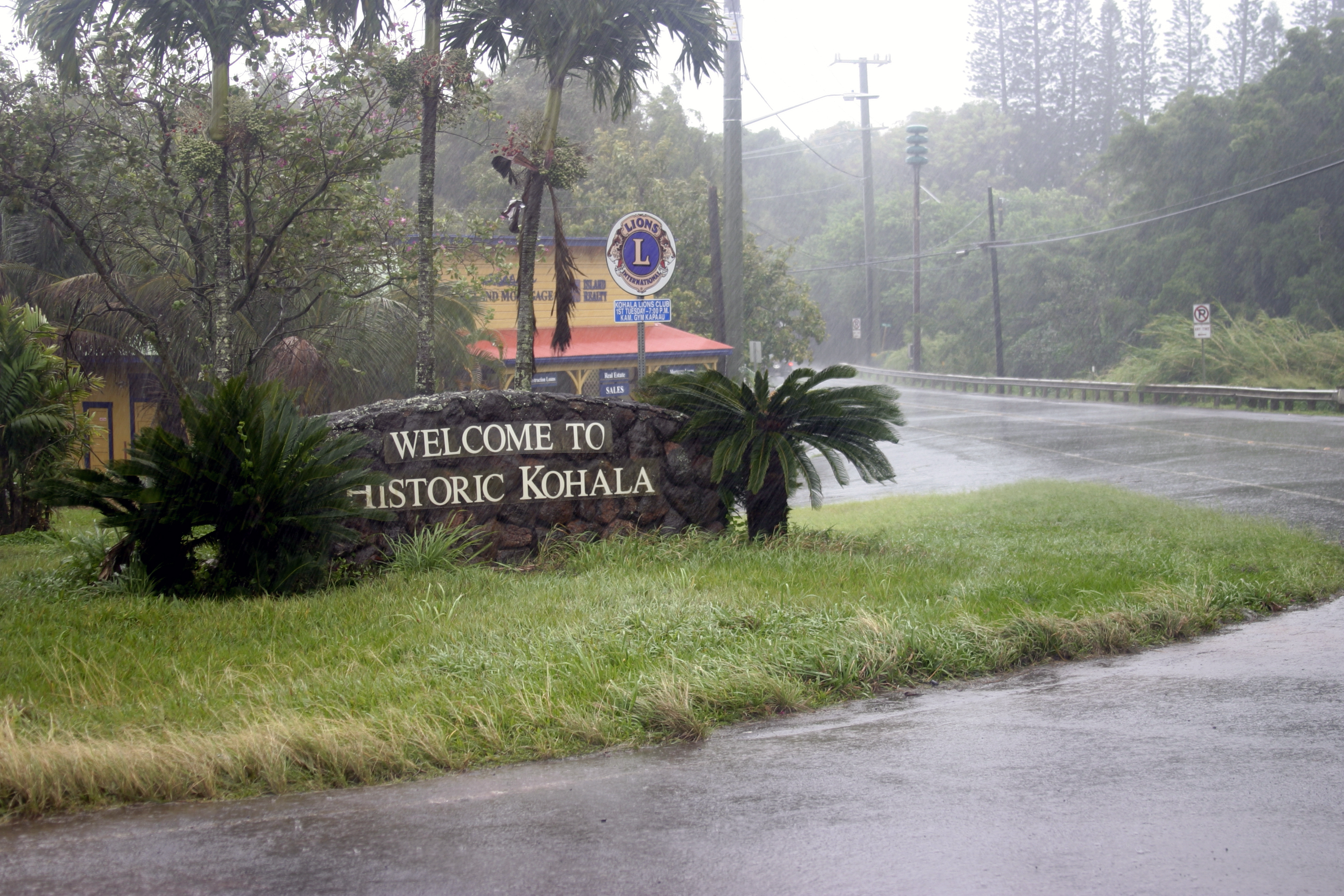
Entering Hawi from the south on Akoni Pule Highway

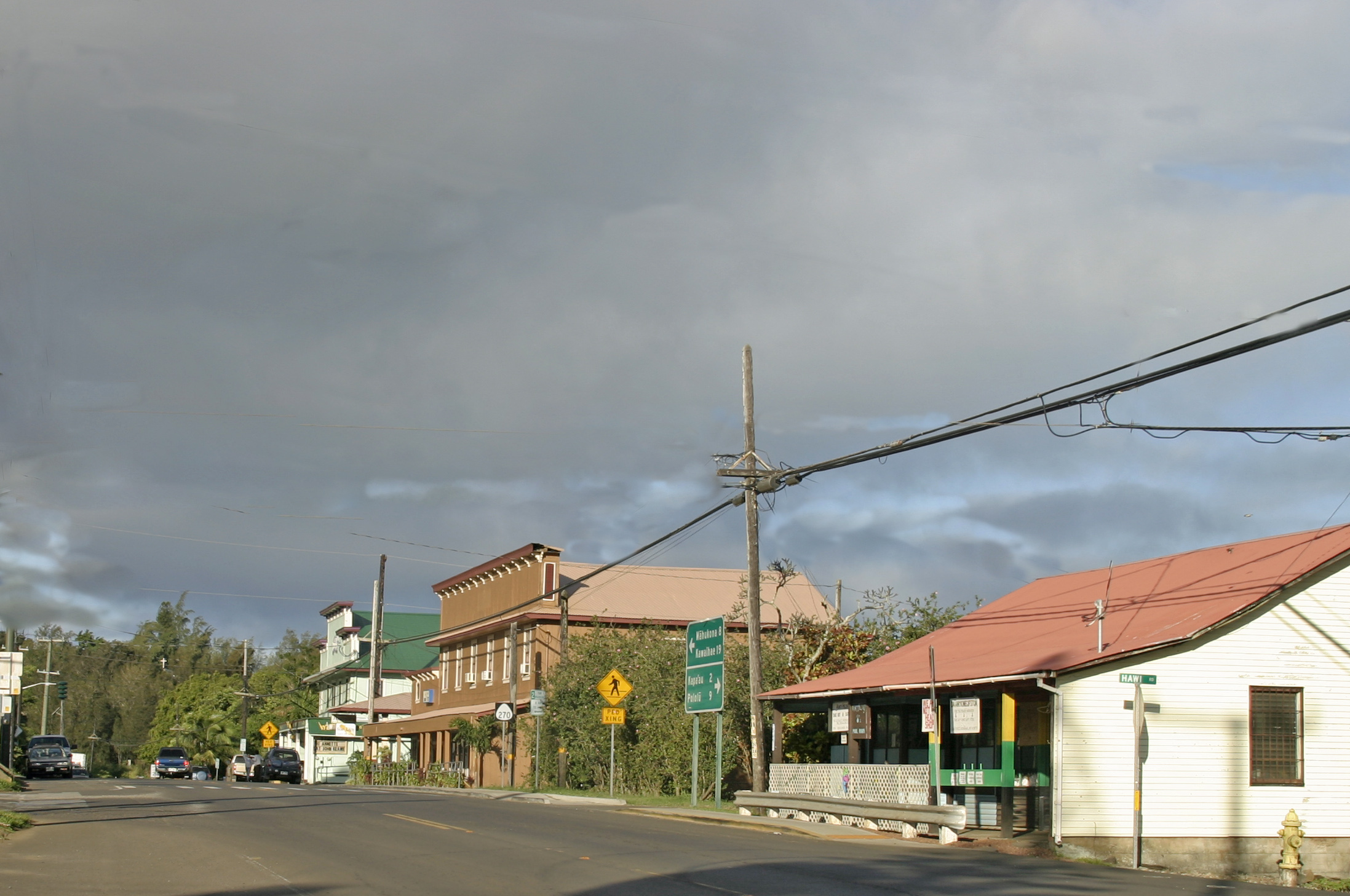
Viewing from south, Ironman Triathlon turn-around

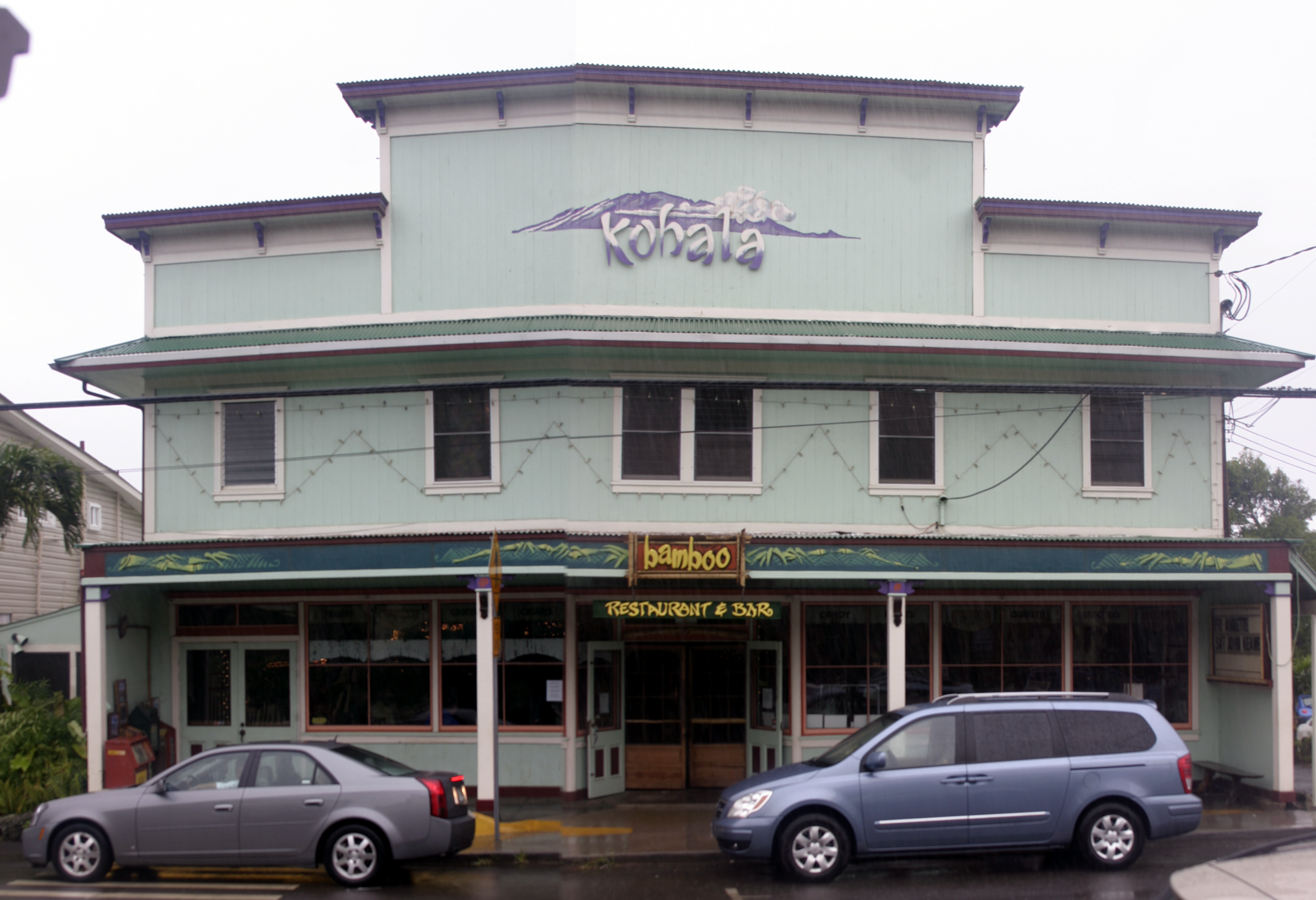
Bamboo Restaurant & Bar

Toyama Building

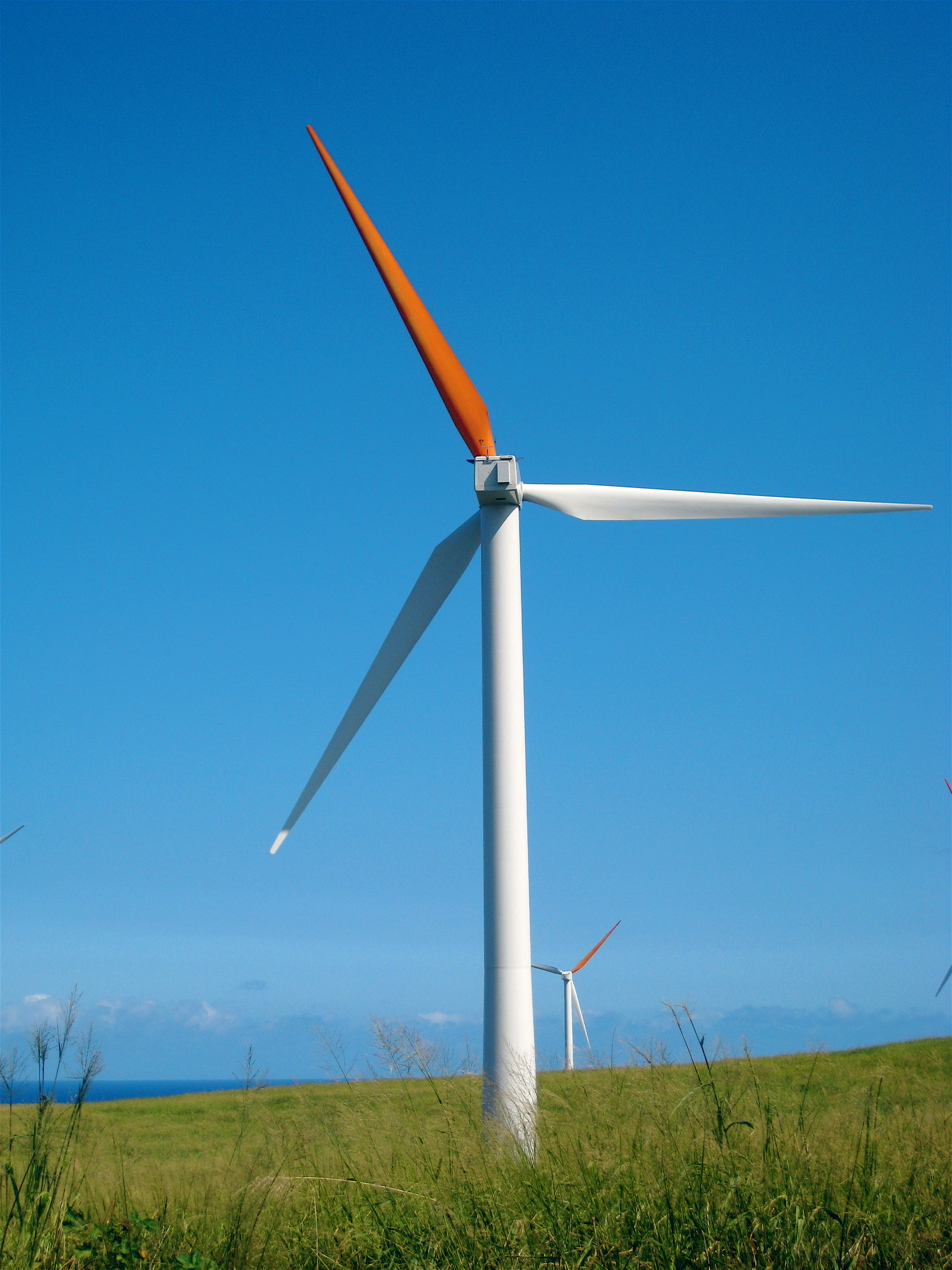
Hawi wind farm
