= Kalohialiʻiokawai =

12th-century chiefess of Hawaii

Kalohialiʻiokawai, (Note: Hawaiian pronunciation: Kah-loh-hee-ah-lee-eeh-oh-kah-wah-eeh) also spelled Kolohialiʻiokawai, was an ancient Hawaiian lady who became Chiefess of Hawaiʻi's the Big Island. A member of the noble family of Maui, Kalohialiʻiokawai was a spouse of ruler of the Big Island and grandmother of Pilikaʻaiea, founder of the Pili line and ancestor of Kamehameha I, King of the Kingdom of Hawaii.

It is unknown when Kalohialiʻiokawai was born, but it is likely that was on Maui, since her father was Hanalaʻa, Chief of Maui. According to one chronology, Hanalaʻa was born c. 1142. Mahuia (Mahuie) was Kalohialiʻiokawai's mother.

Princes Mauiloa and Lanakawai were Kalohialiʻiokawai's brothers and Mauiloa became Chief of Maui after Hanalaʻa's death. Whilst Mauiloa succeeded his father, Lanakawai started the reign over Hawai'i. Lanakawai married Kalohialiʻiokawai and the couple had son, Laʻau and daughter, Kukamolimaulialoha, who were married and went to Kahiki, whilst Kalohialiʻiokawai's grandchildren were Pilikaʻaiea and his sister-wife, Hina-au-kekele.

Although it is unknown what happened to Kalohialiʻiokawai, Lanakawai was succeeded by Kapawa, deposed by Kalohialiʻiokawai's grandson.
