= Kaniuhu =

High Chief of the island of Hawaii

- Occupation: Chief of Hawaiʻi
- Spouse: Hiliamakani
- Children: Kanipahu
- Writing career
- Language: Hawaiian

Chief Kaniuhu (Hawaiian: Aliʻi Kaniuhu) was an ancient Hawaiian noble and the High Chief (Hawaiian: Aliʻi Nui) of the Island of Hawaiʻi (the "Big Island"). He was a member of the “Pili line”, as a descendant of Chief Pilikaaiea and his sister Hina, who were born on Tahiti (Kahiki).

== Etymology ==
Kaniuhu’s name means “grief/sorrow” in Hawaiian. He is also called Kaniuhi.

== Life ==
=== Early life and marriage ===
Kaniuhu was born on the Big Island, in ancient Hawaii, to the High Chief Kukohou and his half-sister, Lady Hineuki, whose sexual union was considered sacred, according to the laws of the Hawaiians. In ancient Hawaii, nobles born from the “sacred unions” were thought to be gods on the Earth. Whilst he was still a boy, he was circumcised, which was a rite of passage for the boys in Hawaii. It is unknown did he have any siblings.

The wife of Kaniuhu was Lady Hiliamakani, whose parents are not known. They had a son named Kanipahu.

=== Reign ===
Kukohou died in ca. 1185, and Kaniuhu became his successor. He was the third chief of the Pili line and he ruled until his death, in ca. 1215, when he was succeeded by Kanipahu. He was an ancestor of the King Kamehameha I of the Kingdom of Hawaii.

Preceded by Kukohou	Aliʻi nui of Hawaii; 1150–1180	Succeeded by Kanipahu
