= Pili =

Pili may refer to:

== Common names of plants ==
- Canarium ovatum, a Philippine tree that is a source of the pili nut
- Heteropogon contortus, a Hawaiian grass used to thatch structures

== Places ==
- Pili, Camarines Sur, is a municipality in the Philippines
- Pili, barangay in Danao, Cebu
- Pili, (or Cerro Pili, 'Pili Hill'), another name for Acamarachi, a volcano in Chile
- Pili Nadi, a stream or small river that flows through Jaunpur, Uttar Pradesh; tributary of the Gomti River

== Other uses ==
- Pili, another name for jianzi, a traditional Chinese sport
- Pili (film), nominated for the BAFTA Award for Outstanding Debut by a British Writer, Director or Producer in 2018
- Pili line, a Hawaiian royal house
  - Pili, short form of Pilikaʻaiea, ruler or aliʻi nui of Hawaii, founder of the Pili line
- Pili, plural of pilus, a cellular organelle
- Pili (TV series), a puppet television show from Taiwan
- Perak, a state of Malaysia, written as 霹雳 or 霹靂 for Chinese
- Pili or Omega Piscium, a star
