= Allow =

Allow may refer to:

- River Allow, river in Ireland
- Allow, a low-carbon aluminium brand by Rusal
- "Allow", a directive in robots exclusion standard
- "Allow", a song on the 2016 album Bad Hair Extensions

== See also ==
- Allowance (disambiguation)
- Alau (disambiguation)
