= Kuamoʻo Moʻokini =

Priest who made Hawaii's first heiau

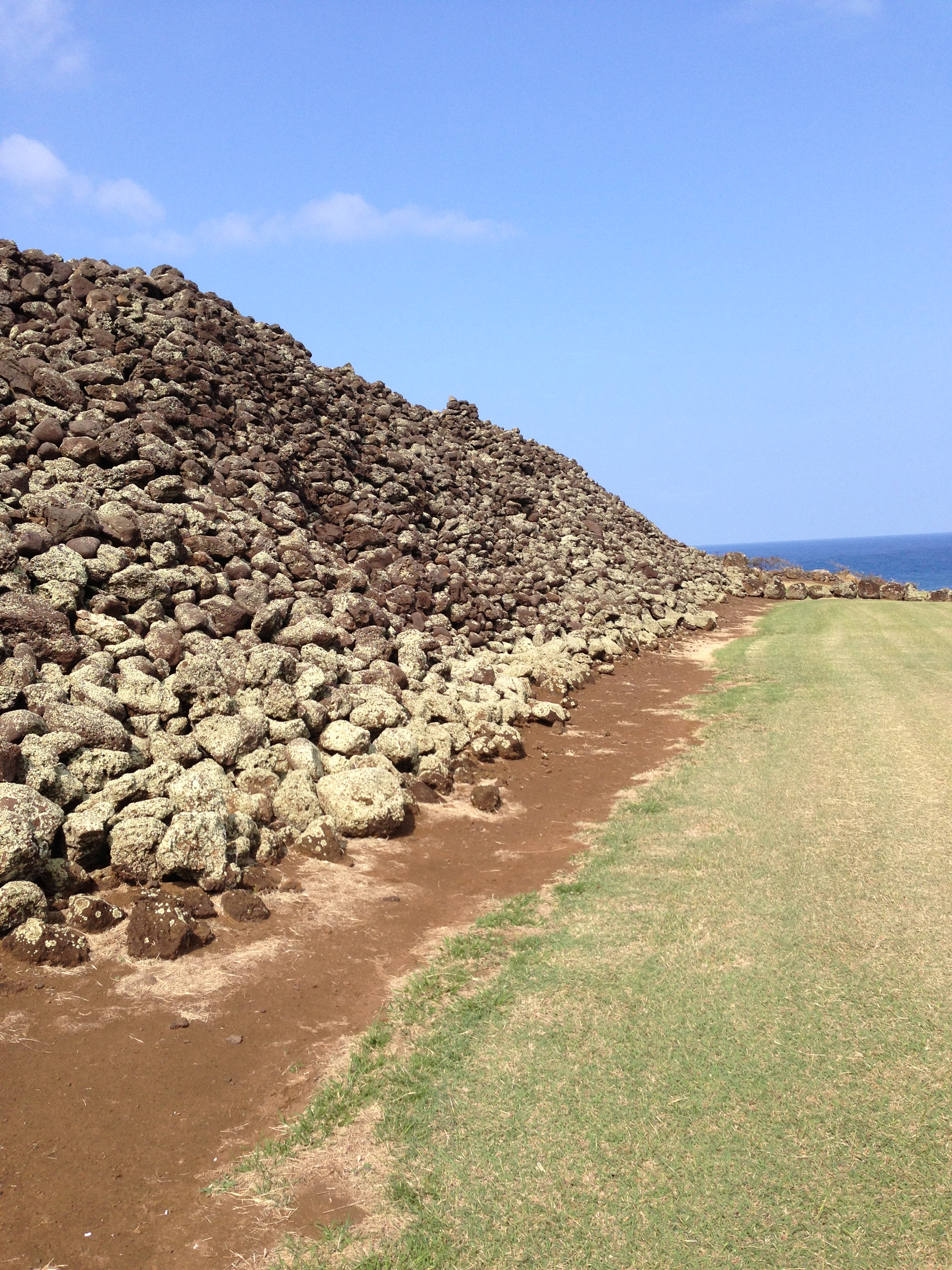
The Stone Wall of Mo'okini Heiau

Kuamoʻo Moʻokini (ca. 1100–1200) was a priest who made Hawaii's first heiau, Mo'okini Heiau, in the Big Island of Hawaii, United States, as a person who actually existed or was only in the legend.

== Oral Tradition ==
According to the oral tradition of genealogy of the kahuna (priest) at Moʻokini Heiau, located in the northwestern corner of the Island of Hawaii, this heiau was established by Kuamoʻo Moʻokini in the year 480. "Kuamo'o" in Hawaiian means "spine" or "road", "Mo'o" "genealogy", and "Kini" "many"; therefore "Mo'okini" may mean "Long genealogy". He was not from the Marquesas Islands, like many others who immigrated to Hawaii at that time, but is said to be from the Persian Gulf of Middle East.

Later the people from the Society Islands (such as Tahiti) migrated to Hawaii. Among them was Pa'ao who brought the religion of Polynesia and perfected it as the Hawaiian religion, including the custom of Luakini. He used Mo'okini Heiau as his heiau for Kū, the symbol of male and god of war, and rebuilt its stone walls.

== Mo'okini's Heritage ==
Kamehameha the Great was born near Moʻokini Heiau in 1785. His birthplace is marked by a stone surrounded by the stone walls, next to this heiau. Together with the smaller heiaus, Mahukona Heiau and Kukuipahu Heiau, Moʻokini Heiau was registered in the National Register of Historic Places in 1962, and was made Kohala Historical Sites State Monument in 1966. Entrance to the sacred place used to be limited to the Ali'i only, but this limitation was lifted in 1978 by the current kahuna.

== See also ==
- Hawi
- Mo'okini Heiau
- Hawaiian religion
