= Lanakawai =

Chief of Hawaiʻi

- Spouse: Lady Kalohialiʻiokawai
- Issue: Laʻau ♂ Kukamolimaulialoha ♀
- Father: Hanalaʻa, Chief of Maui
- Mother: Mahuia
- Religion: Hawaiian religion

Lanakawai—also known as Lanaikawai and Lonokawai—was an ancient Hawaiian nobleman, who was a Prince of the island of Maui. He became a High Chief of the island of Hawaiʻi (the Big Island). His grandson was the founder of the Pili line, a dynasty of the chiefs of the Big Island.

== Biography ==
It is likely that Lanakawai was born on Maui. He was a son of the High Chief Hanalaʻa, ruler of Maui. The mother of Lanakawai was Mahuia, Lady of Maui, and she is also called Mahuie, whilst the brother of Lanakawai was High Chief Mauiloa. Mauiloa became a ruler of Maui, whilst Lanakawai became a ruler of Hawaiʻi.

Lanakawai married his sister, Lady Kalohialiʻiokawai, who was also called Kolohialiʻiokawai. They had at least two children:

- Laʻau — son
- Kukamolimaulialoha — daughter

Laʻau and his sister were married, and they went to Kahiki (Tahiti), where their children were born. Their son was Pilikaʻaiea, whilst their daughter was Hina-au-kekele.

Lanakawai was succeeded by Kapawa, a man who was a usurper, but who was deposed by Lanakawai's grandson Pilikaʻaiea.

== Bibliography ==
- Peleioholani, Solomon Lehuanui Kalaniomaiheuila (1906). Genealogy of the Robinson family, and ancient legends and chants of Hawaii.
