= Hineuki =

Hawaiian noble lady and Chiefess

- Spouses: Kukohou; Pokai
- Father: Aliʻiponi
- Mother: Hinamaileliʻi

Hineuki (also called Hinakeʻuki or simply Hina; keuki = "tantalizer") was a Hawaiian noble lady and Chiefess of the island of Hawaiʻi as the wife of Kukohou, Aliʻi Nui of Hawaiʻi. She was named after the goddess Hina, who was one of the most important deities in the religion of the Ancient Hawaiians.

== Life ==
Lady Hineuki — named after Hina — was a daughter of Aliʻiponi and his consort, Lady Hinamaileliʻi (Hinamaiheliʻi), who was a daughter of Ko and his sister, Lady Hinaʻauamai — children of the Chief Pilikaʻaiea (often simply called Pili) and his sister, Lady Hina-au-kekele. Pili was succeeded by the High Chief Kukohou, who was his descendant; Hineuki was Kukohouʻs maternal half-sister. Kukohou and Hineuki were married, according to the customs of the Hawaiian chiefs, and their union was considered sacred. Their son was High Chief Kaniuhu, a successor of his father, and through him, Hineuki was a grandmother of Chief Kanipahu, an ancestor of King Kamehameha I, the first ruler of the Kingdom of Hawaii.

The other husband of Hineuki was called Pokai; his parents are not known today. Their child was High Chiefess Alaʻikauakoko, Aliʻi Wahine of Oahu and Hawaiʻi—the mother of Kalapana, Aliʻi of Hawaiʻi, and Kapae-a-Lakona, Aliʻi of Oʻahu. Hineuki died in Hawaiʻi and she has been buried there.

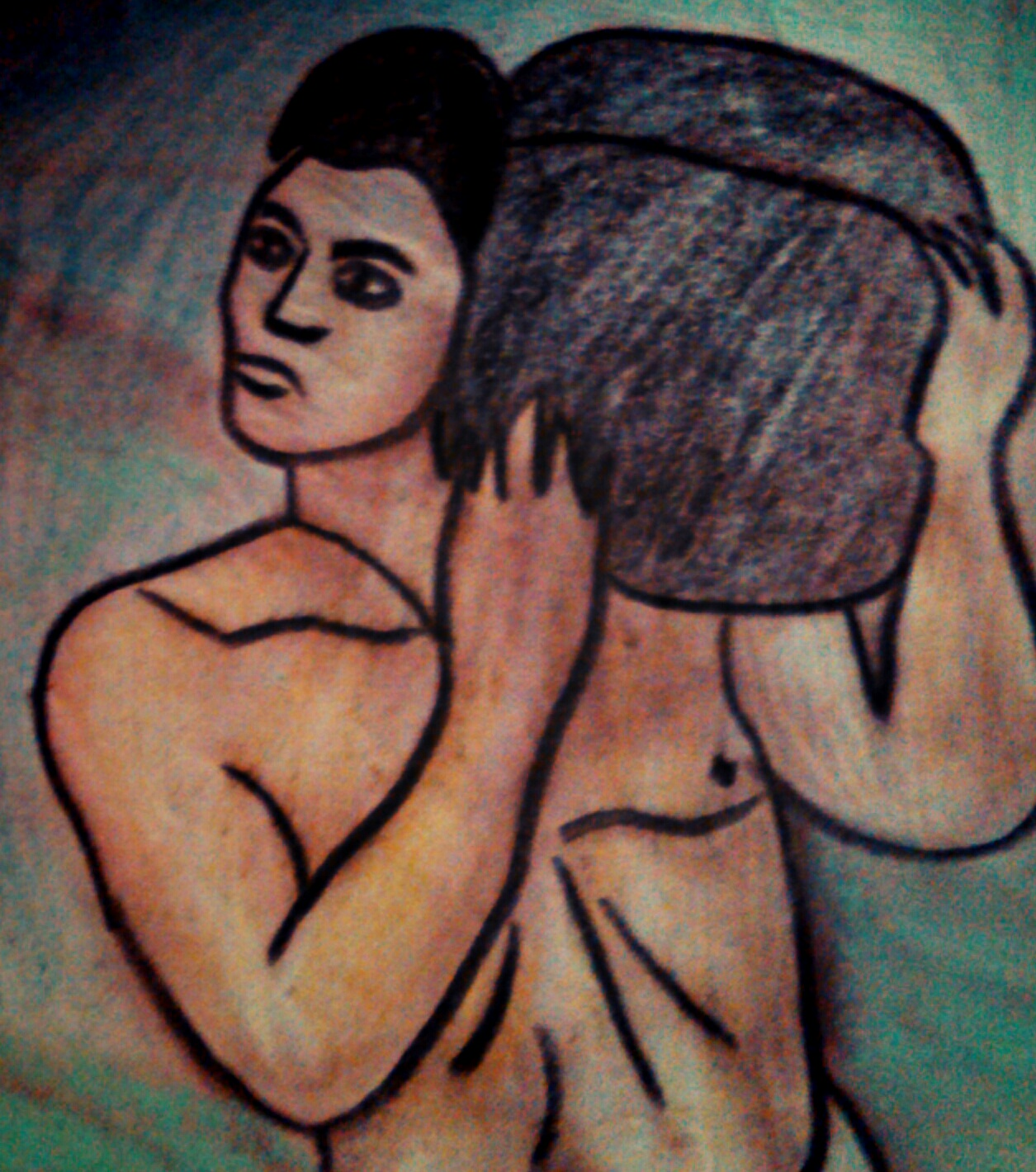
Hineuki and her spouse Kukohou were descendants of Chief Pilikaʻaiea.
