= Alau =

Alau may refer to:

- Aliʻi nui Alau son of Mauiloa Aliʻi ʻaimoku of Maui & father of Kanemokuhealiʻi
- Alau, Nepal
- Australian street slang for an Alley-oop (basketball)
- Alau Ice Palace, a speed skating oval in Astana, Kazakhstan
- Alau or durian alau, regional names for Durio graveolens

== See also ==
- Alaus, a genus of click beetle
