= Wakalana =

Hawaiian chief (born c. 1252)

Wakalana (born c. 1252 in ancient Hawaii) was a noble (Aliʻi) in Hawaii and a Chief of Wailuku. Parents of Wakalana were High Chief Lonomai of Maui and Chiefess Kolu. Wakalana was a descendant of Chief Mauiloa – this is mentioned in the old chants of the Hawaiians.

During Wakalana's rule, a "strange vessel" arrived at Wailuku, Maui, and Wakalana even married a foreign woman from this ship. The woman was called Neleike, which can be a Hawaiian form of a European name. However, Wakalana was also married to woman called Kaua'i–it's unclear who was the mother of Chief Alo of Maui.

Family tree of Maui Chiefs

Kanemokuhealiʻi
Chief Lonomai
Keikauhale
Wakalana
Chiefess Kolu
Chief Alo of Maui
Wakalanaʻs wife

== See also ==
- Samuel Kamakau. Ka Nupepa Kuokoa.
