= Kaheka-o-Alo =

Chief of the island of Maui

According to the Hawaiian chants, Kaheka-o-Alo ("Kaheka, child of Alo") was a High Chief of the Island of Maui. Kaheka was born c. 1301 in the "Ulu genealogy“.

His parents were chief Alo (Wakalana's son) and his wife (consort) Puia (II).

Kaheka succeeded his father as the ruler of his island and was married to Maiaoula, called Maʻaoula by Samuel Kamakau, who describes the history of Maui Chiefs. Mapuleo was the son of Kaheka.
