= Hanalaʻa =

High Chief of ancient Hawaii

- Spouse: Mahuia
- Children: Mauiloa; Lanakawai
- Writing career
- Language: Hawaiian language

Hanalaʻa was a High Chief who lived on the island of Maui in ancient Hawaii. Hanalaʻa had control over portions of Western Maui and is mentioned in legends and chants, where his family tree is given.

== Family ==
Hanalaʻa was a son of Palena of Maui and his wife, Hikawai.

Maternal grandparents of Hanalaʻa were Limaloa-Lialea and Kauilaianapu (Kauilaʻanapa). Hanalaʻa succeeded his father as king of Maui.

Hanalaʻa was a noted chieftain, whom both the Mauian and Hawaiian chiefs contended for as their ancestor under the varying names of Hanalaʻa-nui and Hanalaʻa-iki, asserting that Palena was the father of twins who bore those names, or a mistake could have been made in the genealogies. It is probable both Hanalaʻas were the same person.

It is said that Hanalaʻa-nui married Mahuia and begat Lanakawai, who then begat Laʻau. Laʻau married Kukamolimolialoha and begat Pilikaʻaiea, High Chief of the Big Island.

Hanalaʻa was succeeded by his son Mauiloa, born out of Queen Mahuia (Mahuʻi.e., Mahuialani). Hanalaʻa and his wife's daughter was Kalohialiʻiokawai.

Preceded by Palena of Maui	Moʻi of Maui	Succeeded by Mauiloa
