= Kahoukapu =

Hawaiian chief

- Spouse(s): Hukulani (sister); Laʻakapu
- Children: Kauholanuimahu
- Parent(s): Kamuleilani; Kuaiwa of Hawaiʻi

Kahoukapu was an ancient Hawaiian nobleman and High Chief of the Big Island — Hawaiʻi. He was a member of the Pili line—as a descendant of Pilikaʻaiea—and an ancestor of King Kamehameha I the Great of Hawai‘i, the first ruler of the Kingdom of Hawai‘i.

== Biography ==
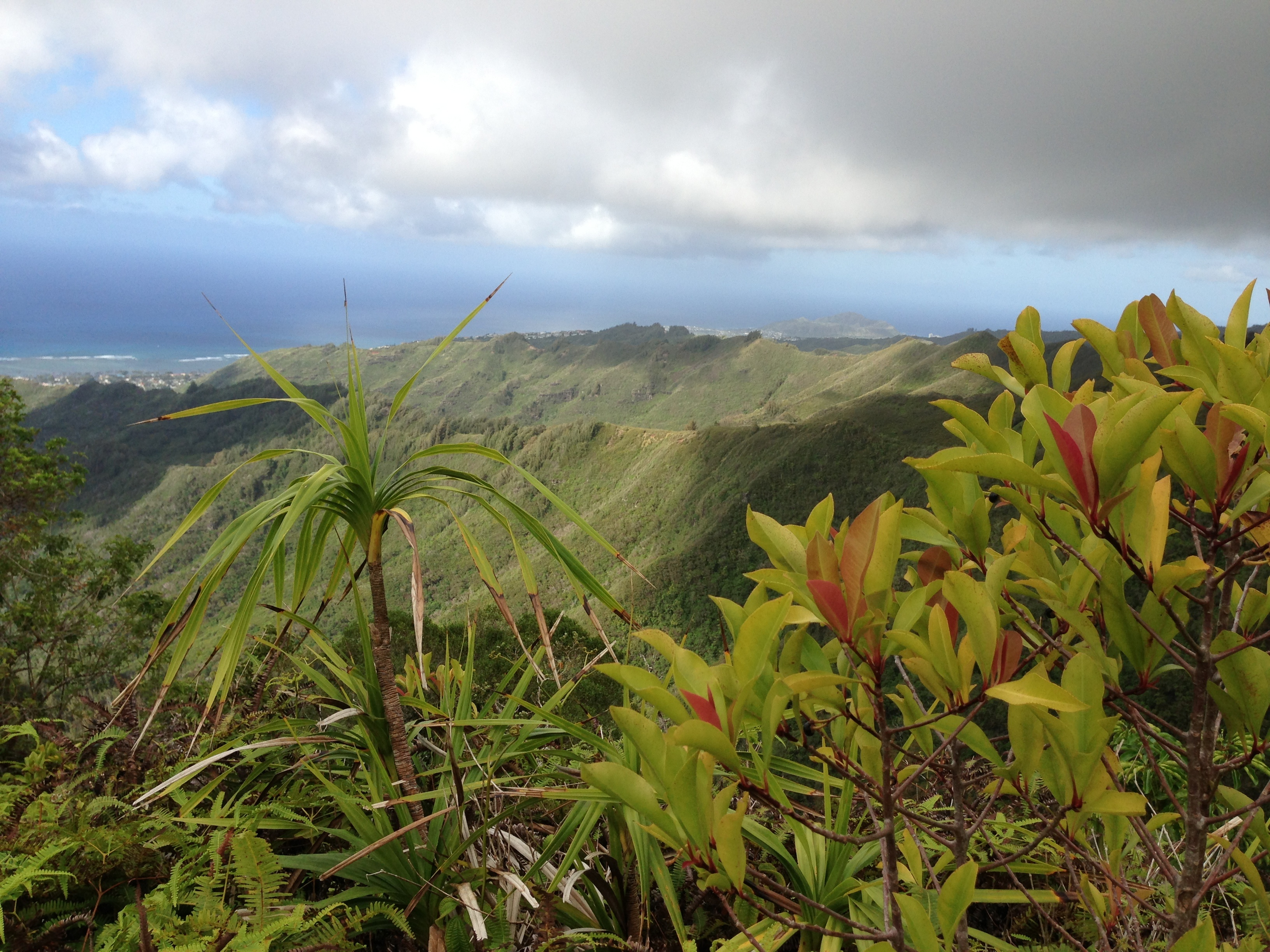
Kahoukapu was a chief of the Big Island (Hawaiʻi).

Chief Kahoukapu was born in ancient Hawaii as a son of High Chief Kuaiwa and his half-sister Kamuleilani (Kainuleilani), and was thus a half-brother to ʻEhu. Because his parents were siblings, Kahoukapu was considered a special human being. In ancient Hawai‘i, marriage between siblings was sacred.

Kahoukapu succeeded his father on the throne, and ruled until his death, which happened ca. 1405. He was then succeeded by his son Kauholanuimahu.

== Marriages ==
Kahoukapu had two marriages, mentioned in the chants. He married his full sister, Lady Hukulani, who bore him son, Prince Makalae. This man was considered a nobleman of the highest rank. Kahoukapu also married woman named Laʻakapu, and their son was Prince Kauholanuimahu, who became a high chief, although his noble rank was not very high, since his parents were not related.

Preceded by Kuaiwa	Aliʻi of Hawaiʻi	Succeeded by Kauholanuimahu
