= Alo of Maui =

- High Chief of Maui
- Spouse: Lady Puia
- Issue: Kaheka-o-Alo
- Religion: Hawaiian religion

Alo (full name: Alo-o-ia) (born c. 1278 in Hawaii) was a ruler/High Chief of the island of Maui (ancient Hawaii). (The Hawaiian title for a nobleman is Aliʻi.)

There is no any archaeological evidence for him.

He is mentioned in the legends and chants; historian Samuel Kamakau describes Alo's family tree–Alo was a son of Chief Wakalana. Kamakau, a noted writer, wrote:

"It is said by some that Neleiki mated with Wakalana and that their child was Alo’oia, who became the chief after Wakalana...“

It's believed that Neleiki was a European lady. Wakalanaʻs wife was Lady (chiefess) Kaua’i, who may have been Alo's mother. To further complicate this matter, some writers mention Alo as Lonomai's child; otherwise, Lonomai is Aloʻs grandfather. The researcher Dean Kekoolani wrote in 2010: “At 20 years a generation, the arrival of the foreign woman Neleike could have been in the 1400's as opposed to the 900's as calculated by Kamakau.“

Alo’s wife was lady Puia II and she bore Alo a son, Kaheka-o-Alo.
