= Pakaʻalana heiau =

Ancient Hawaiian temple

Coordinates: 20.1190°N 155.5950°W

Pakaʻalana heiau was an ancient Hawaiian temple (heiau) complex, sanctuary and refuge (puʻuhonua) in Waipio Valley where the god Lono was worshiped. It was the religious center on the Island of Hawaii dating before the time of Liloa or his sons Hakau and ʻUmi-a-Līloa. It was also the site of Hale o Liloa that held a statue of the god in a corner of the structure and bones of ancient Native Hawaiians who were revered as gods. The complex is said to have had a six-foot carved stone statue of Liloa. The temple is located in the former district of Hamakua. Here, Kiha killed the leader of a bandit clan named Ika, along with his companions, as a sacrifice.

== Origins ==
According to Winona Beamer, Waipio Valley has had; "An aura of enchantment, of mysticism" since 1415 when the "puʻuhonua" or "place of refuge" called Pakaʻalana was built. She recalls that the area is associated with the goddess Hiʻiaka, who fought a legendary battle at the mouth of Waipio Valley with Makaʻukiu, and that the area is chosen by the Hawaiian gods as a place that is constantly guarded by cliff spirits who are keeping watch.

== First royal mausoleum ==
Prior to the Westernized tombs of the Hawaiian royalty such as Mauna Ala, there were only two ancient heiau designated as royal tomb enclosures, Hale o Keawe and Hale o Liloa.

Liloa had named his first born son Hakau as his heir. However, he left the care of Pakaʻalana heiau to his lower-ranking son Umi A Liloa. Hakau was jealous that Umi was more favored by his father, and when Hakau became king Umi was forced into exile in Hilo. After the death of his father, Hakau built a temple and names it the Hale o Liloa and interred the bones of Liloa there. In 1828–29, Kuhina Nui (Regent) Kaʻahumanu visited the Waipio Valley and took the kaʻai (funerary basket) of Liloa and Lono-i-ka-Makahiki and had them hidden at Kaawa-loa in a cave. The remains were moved again in 1858 and finally interred at Mauna Ala in 1865 along with other aliʻi from the Royal Tomb at Pohukaina.
