= Alau of Maui =

High Chief (born ca. 1186) or prince of Maui and father to Kanemokuhealiʻi

Alau, High Chief of Maui
- Aliʻi of Maui
- Issue: Chief Kanemokuhealiʻi
- Religion: Hawaiian religion

There was a chief with the similar name, Alo of Maui.

Alau (born in ancient Hawaii) was a high chief of the island of Maui. The name of this Hawaiian nobleman is recorded in the chants, where his family tree is given.

His Hawaiian title is aliʻi.

Alau's father was Mauiloa, High Chief of Maui. There are several variants of the Maui chiefs' genealogy, so it's possible to find sources which differ in giving the exact information. One chronology of Hawaiian history places Alau's birth in ca. 1186. Mauiloa's wife Kauhua was the mother of Alau (according to Samuel Kamakau).

The consort of Alau was the woman named Moeiekana, and her parentsʻ names are completely unknown. She became the Chiefess of Maui by marriage to Alau and the couple had a son, Chief Kanemokuhealiʻi. She is also called Moekeaea.

Kanemokuhealiʻi succeeded his father Alau as the high chief of the Island of Maui and had at least one son. Itʻs likely that Kanemokuhealiʻi was circumcised according to the custom of the Hawaiians.
