= Charles Montague Cooke Jr. House and Kūkaʻōʻō Heiau =

Historic house in Hawaii, United States

- Charles Montague Cooke Jr. House and Kūka‘ō‘ō Heiau
- U.S. National Register of Historic Places
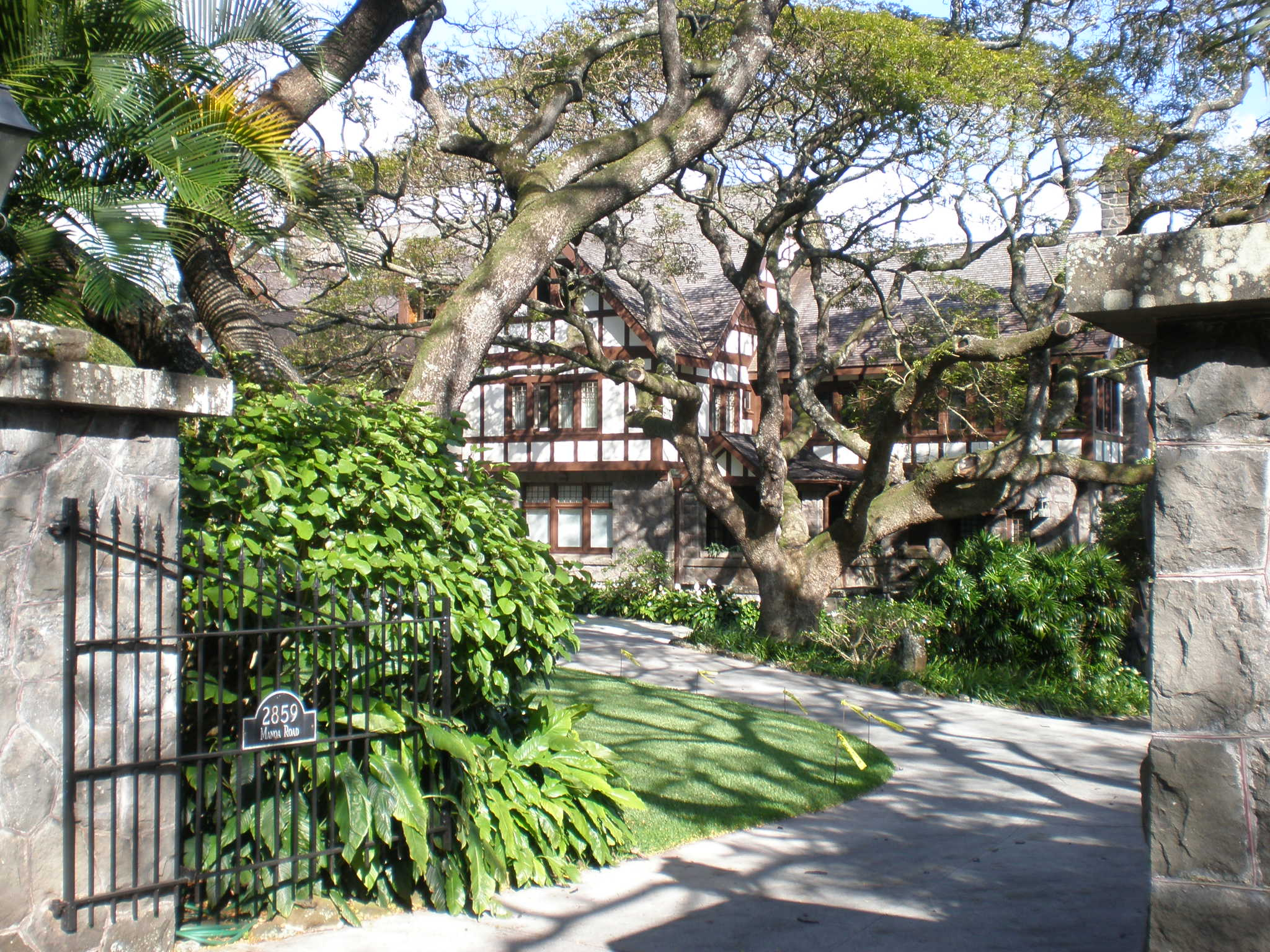
- Kualii, view from the main gate

- Location within Hawaii
- Location: 2859 Manoa Rd., Honolulu, Hawaii
- Coordinates: 21°18′29″N 157°49′0″W
- Built: 1912
- Architects: Emory & Webb
- Architectural style: Tudor Revival
- NRHP reference No.: 85003402 and 00000267
- Added to NRHP: October 31, 1985 (original) and August 30, 2000 (increase)

Charles Montague Cooke Jr. House and Kūkaʻōʻō Heiau is a property in Honolulu, Hawaii. The house, also known as Kualii (also spelled Kualiʻi), was built in 1911–1912 for Charles Montague Cooke Jr., and listed on the National Register of Historic Places in 1985. The listing's boundaries were increased in 2000 to include the Kūkaʻōʻō Heiau (Tax Map Keys 2-9-19:35 and 2-9-19:43, respectively).

== Building history ==
In 1902, wealthy businessman Charles Montague Cooke (of Castle & Cooke) gave his son Monty (as Charles Montague Cooke Jr. was called) a large tract of land on a high ridge in Mānoa Valley that contained an ancient Hawaiian heiau. That was the year Monty married Lila Lefferts. In 1911, Monty hired two prominent architects, Walter Emory and Marshall Webb, to build a large stone mansion in Tudor style on the hillside above the heiau. The house cost $40,000 and was named for an ancient Hawaiian chief.

The basement and ground floor, built of basalt lava rock quarried on site, support two upper floors of half-timber and stucco. At each end of the house is a heavy stone chimney, one rising from the kitchen, the other from the living room. The central entry bay is covered by a porte-cochere with stone columns and a half gabled second floor above it, and flanked by gabled entry bays at each end of the house.

== Heiau ==
The name of the heiau (temple of ancient Hawaii), Kūkaʻōʻō, is composed of kū 'stand' + ka 'the' + ʻōʻō 'digging stick', and has several possible translations. According to one source, it means 'Kū of the digging stick'. According to another, it means 'standing digging stick', in apparent reference to an old legend about a chief named Kawelo who was said to have thrown a digging stick from the highest mountain at the back of the valley down onto the hill where the heiau stands, known as Puʻu Pueo 'owl hill'.

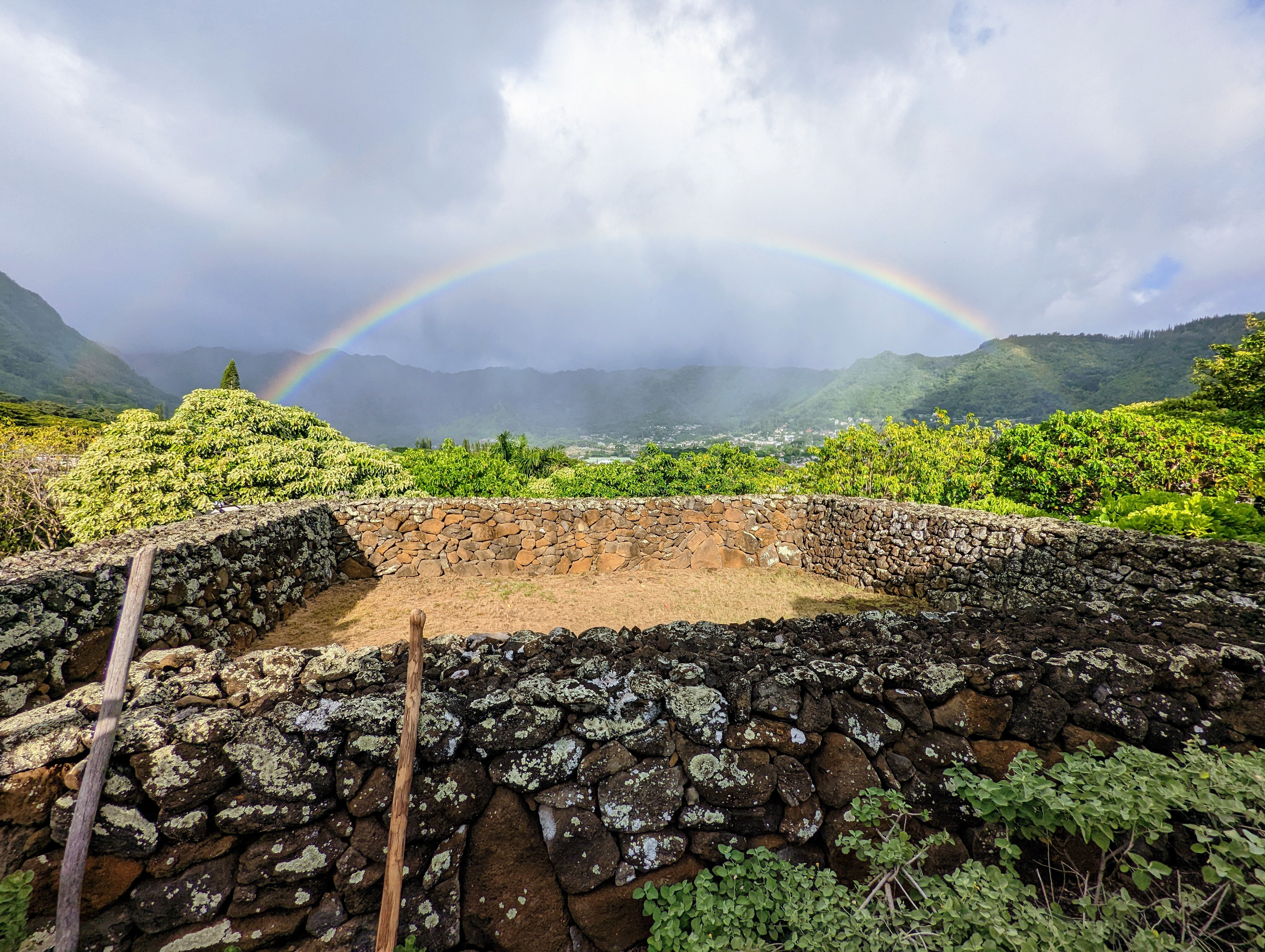
Kūkaʻōʻō heiau at Mānoa Heritage Center, 2022-10-25.

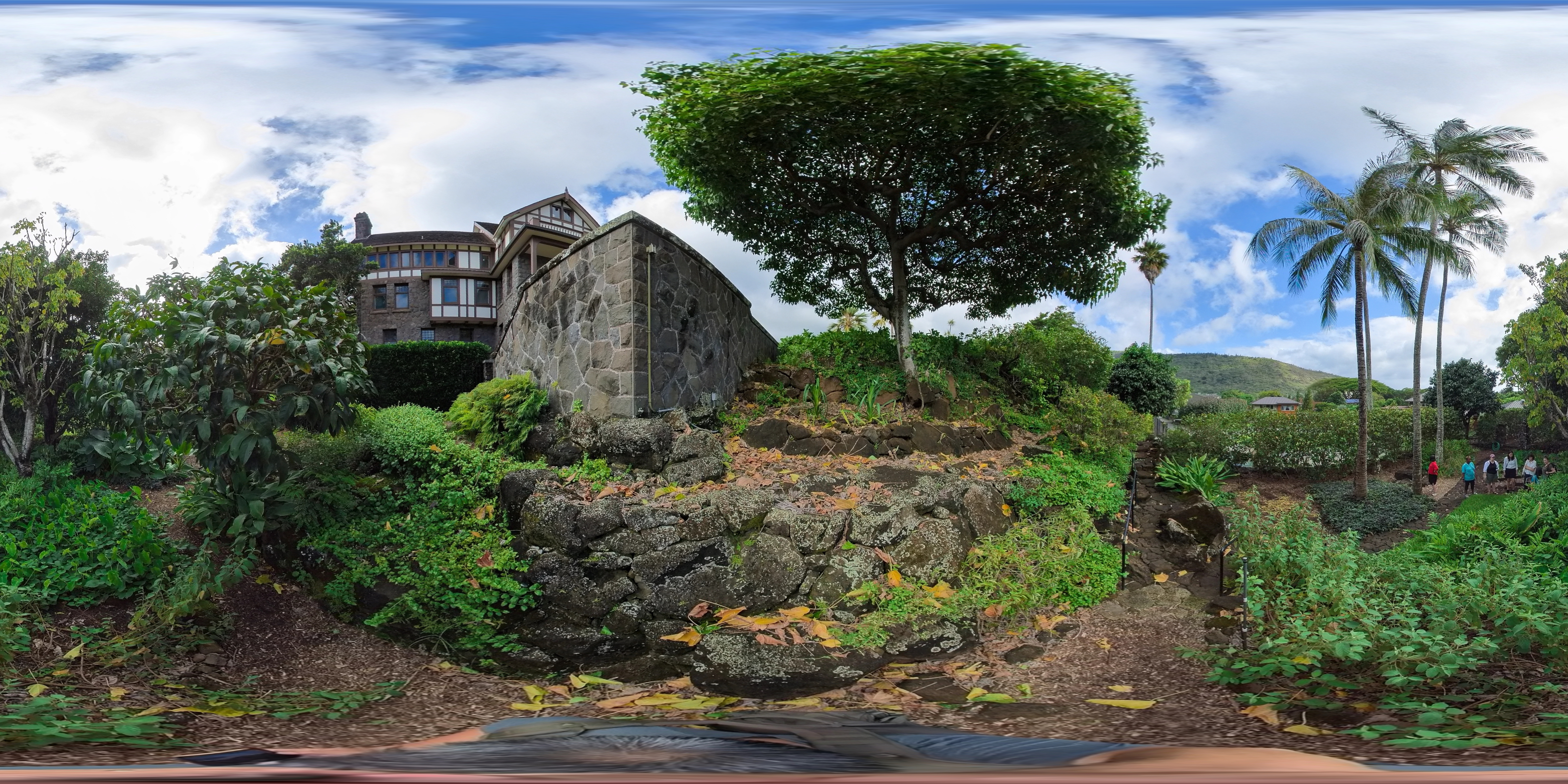
Panoramic view of Charles Montague Cooke Jr. House and Manoa Heritage Center (view as a 360° interactive panorama)

The square-shaped heiau measures about 12 meters across and stands about 6 meters above the flat, rocky clearing on which it stands. The late Bernice P. Bishop Museum anthropologist Kenneth Emory estimated the heiau to be 1,000 years old. Its gardens used to help sustain the population of the ahupuaʻa of Waikiki.

In 1992, the current owners, Samuel Alexander Cooke (born 1937, grandson of Charles Montague Cooke Jr.) and Mary Cooke, purchased the land and commissioned preservationist Nathan Napoka to reconstruct the walls of the old heiau, which had been badly overgrown. Stonemason Billy Fields relied on survey drawings from the 1930s to rebuild the walls, using only rocks found on-site.

In 1996, the Mānoa Heritage Center was established to manage the site and offer educational tours.

== Gallery ==
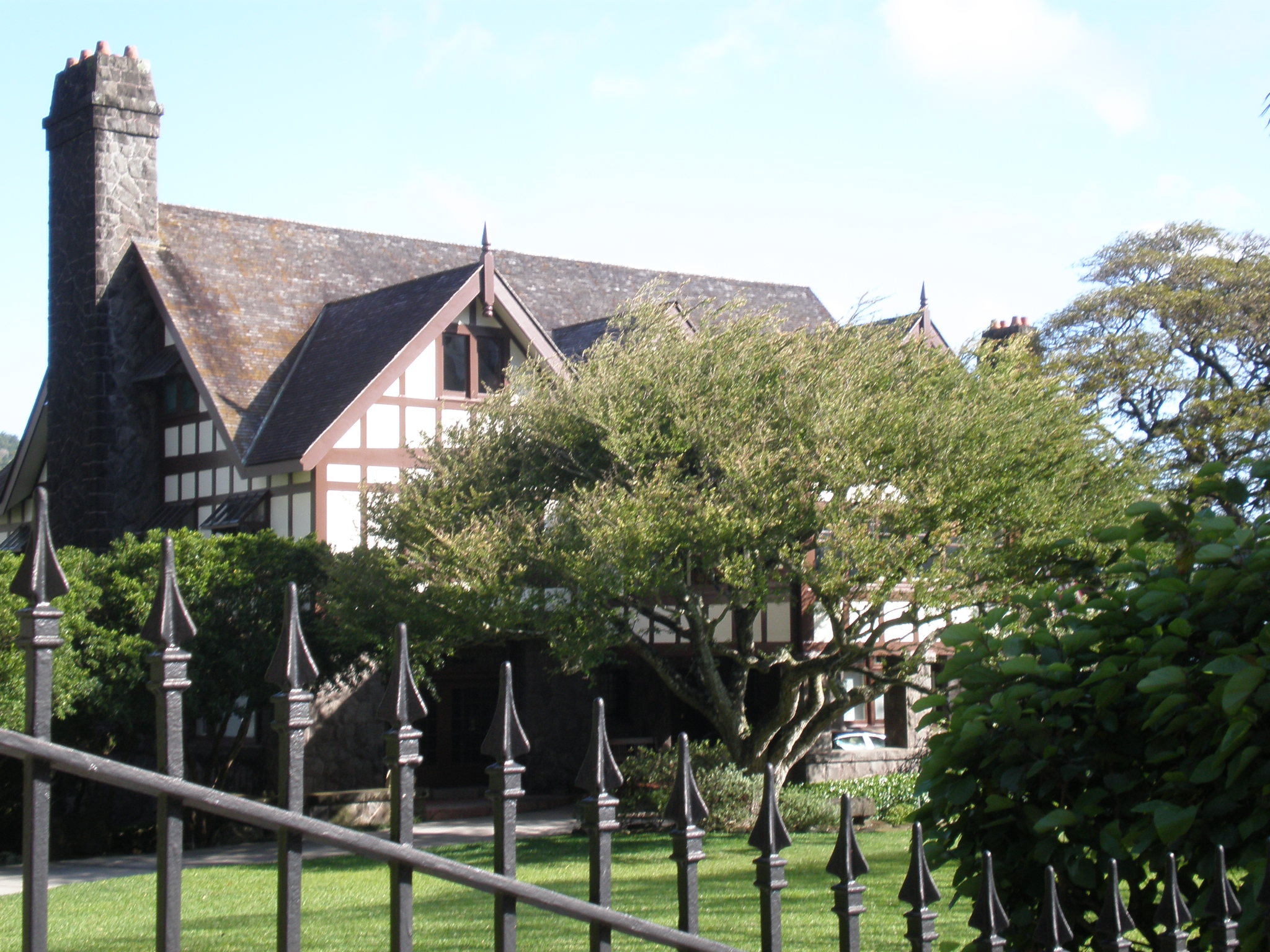
View from upper gate

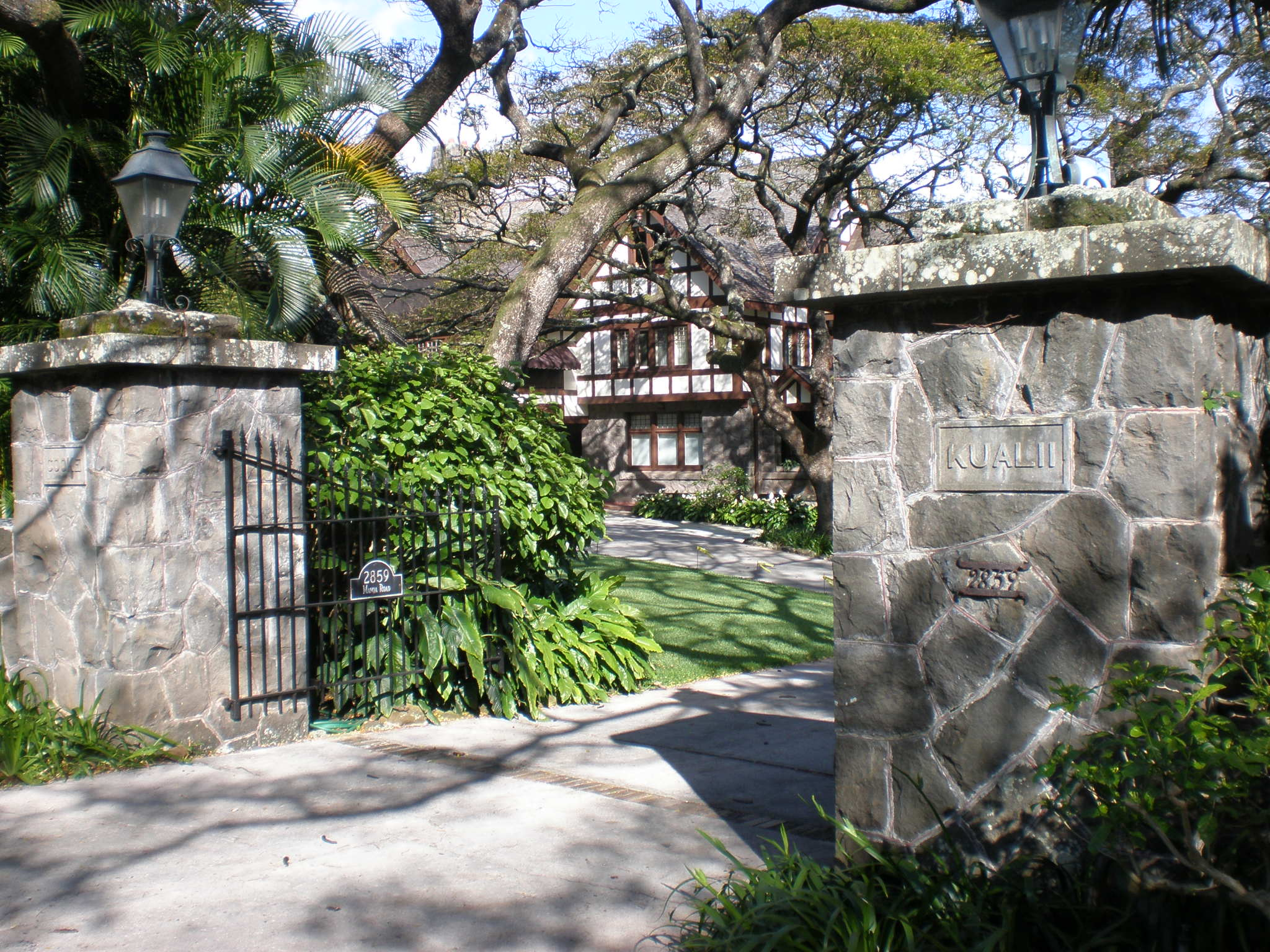
Kualii gateposts

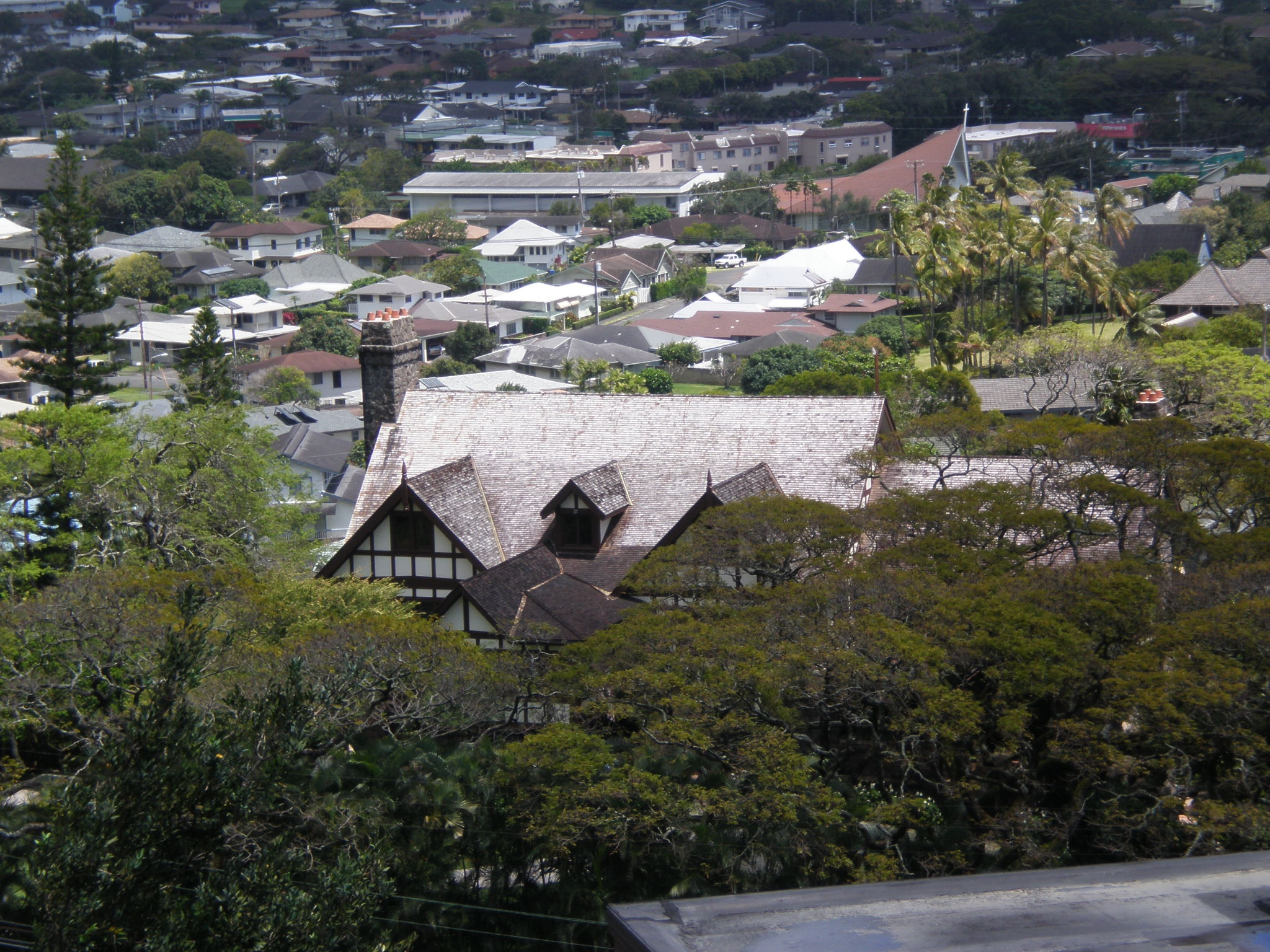
Kualii from Puuhonua Avenue above

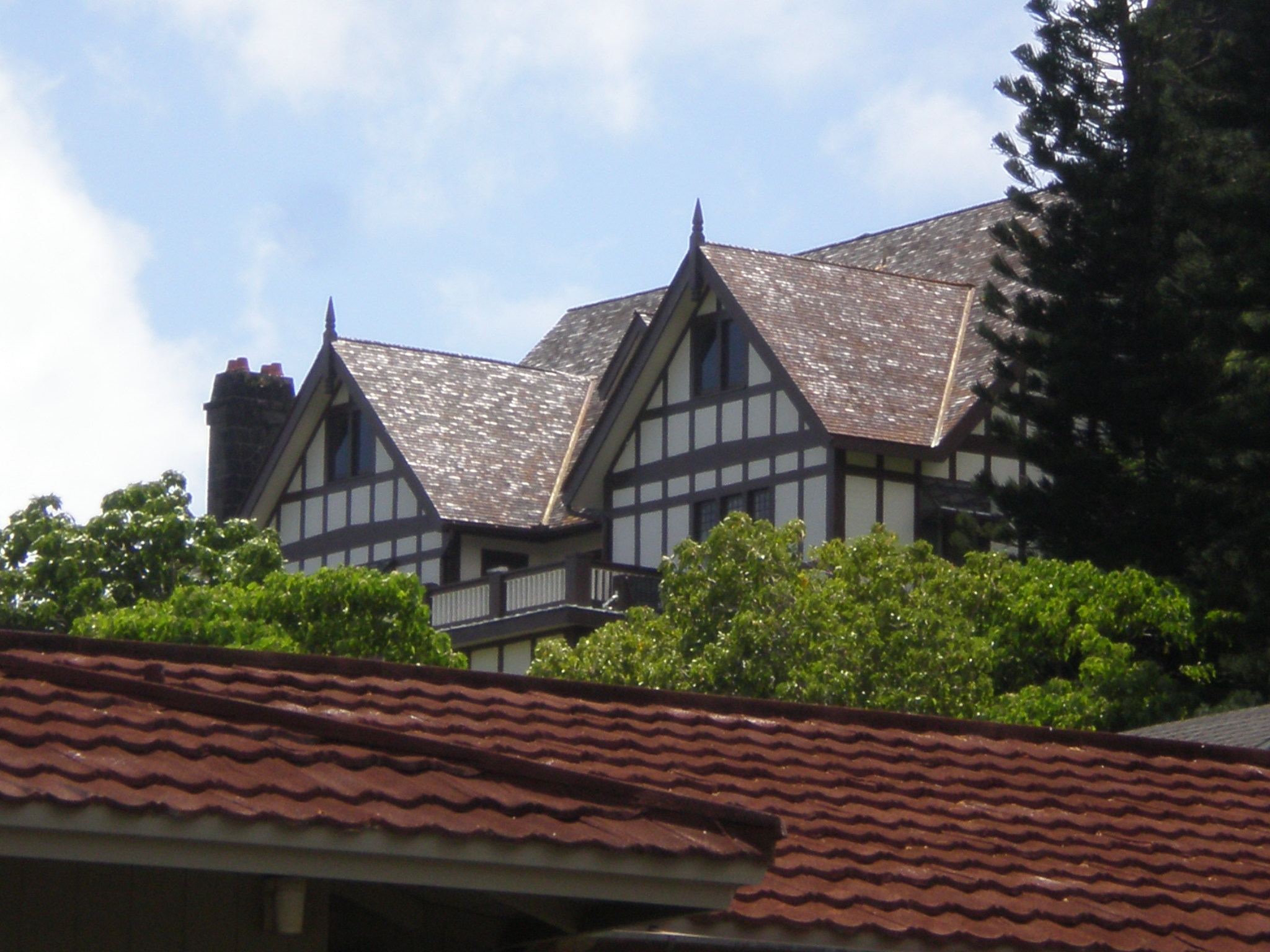
Kualii from Oahu Avenue below

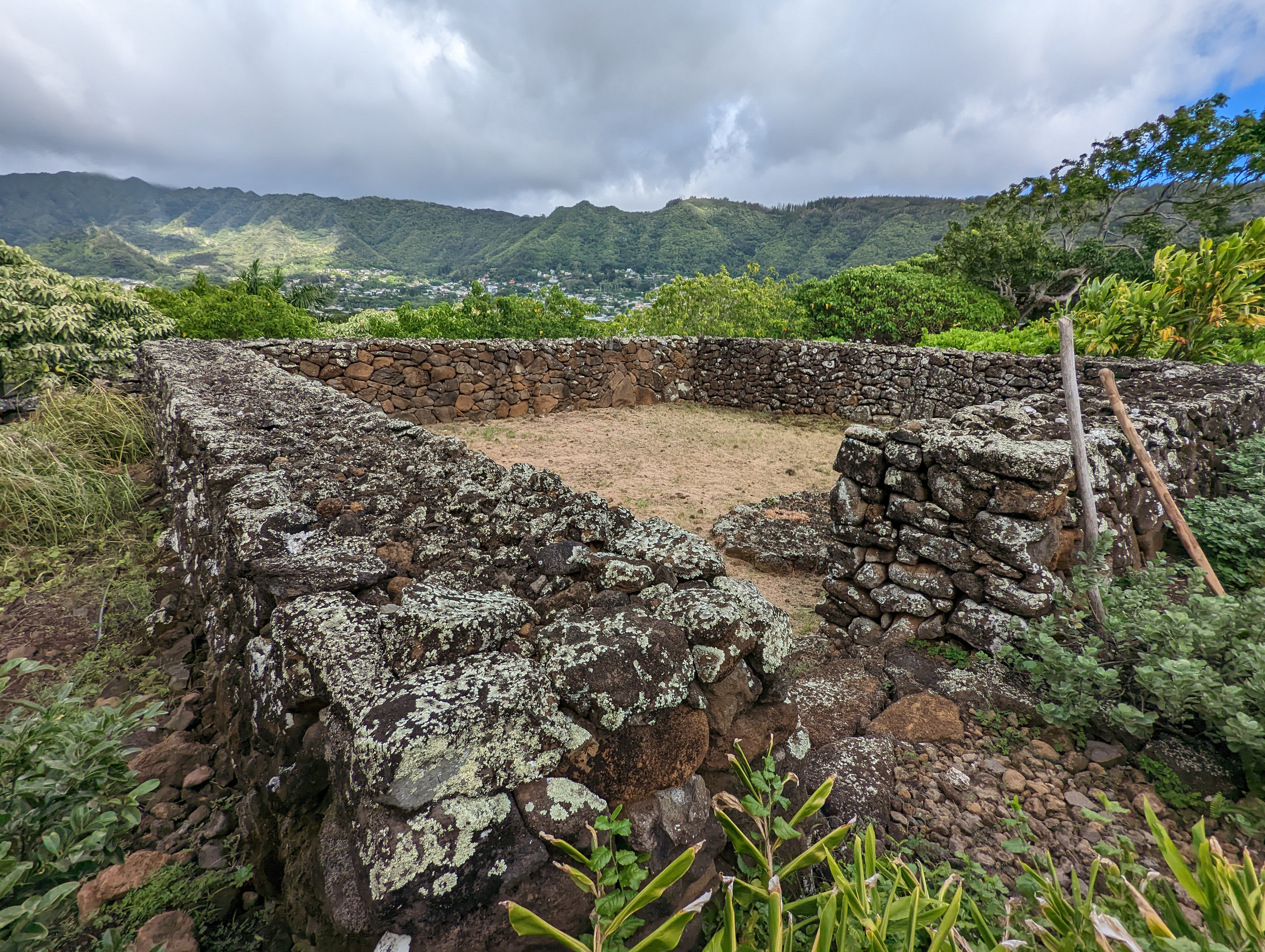
Kūkaʻōʻō Heiau from above

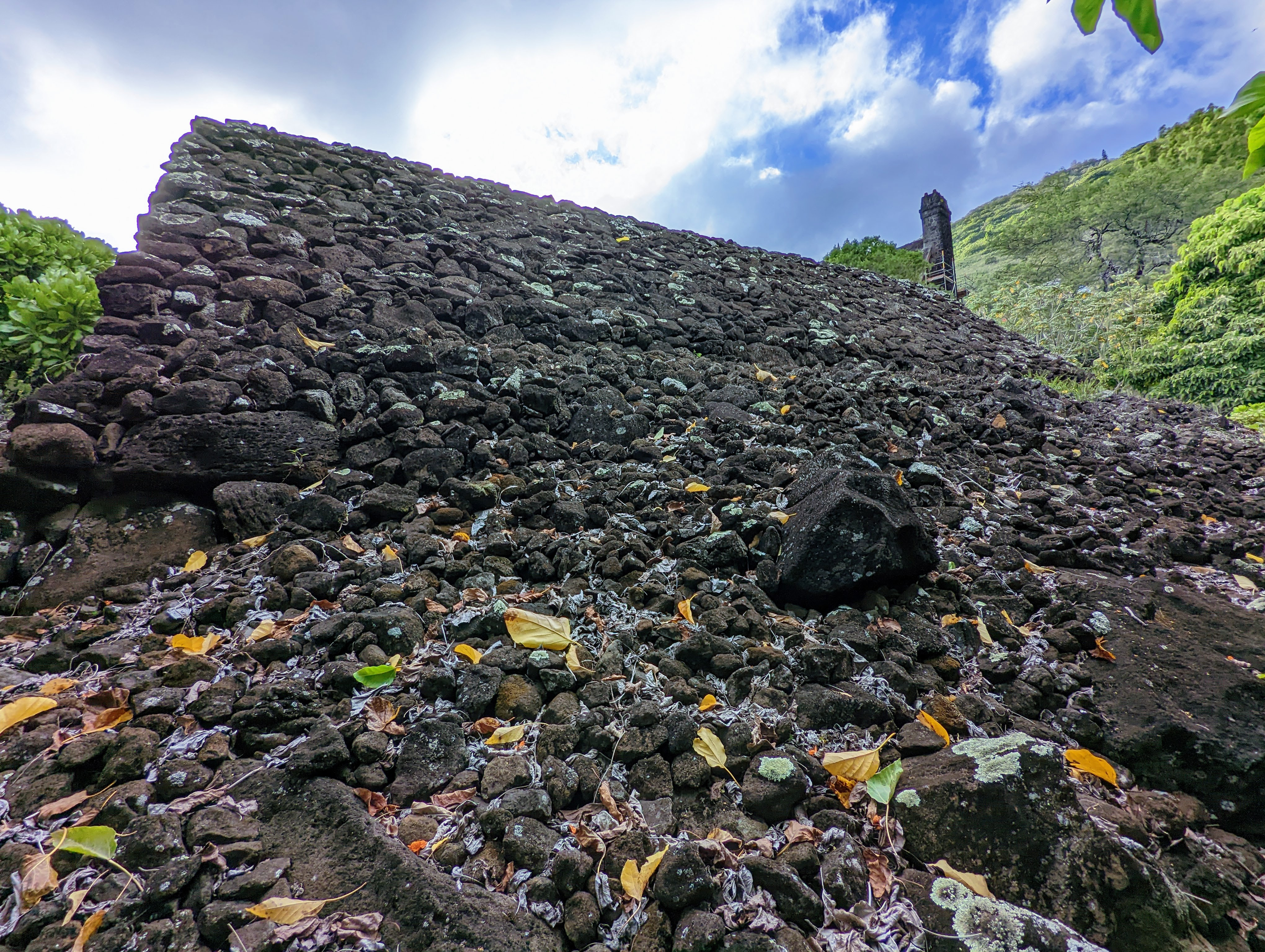
Kūkaʻōʻō Heiau from below
