= Palena of Maui =

Palena
- Spouse: Hikawai
- Children: Hanalaʻa
- Parent(s): Haho of Maui; Kauwilaʻanapū

Palena (born ca. 1120, Mokae, Hana, Maui) is a name of a chief mentioned in the ancient Hawaiian legends, where it is said that he was Aliʻi nui of Maui in ancient Hawaii. It seems that he was a semi-mythical Aliʻi.

There was also Chiefess Palena. She was a wife of Panaikaiaiki and mother of one son, Ahulinuikaʻapeapea.

== Biography ==
According to the chant, Palena was born ca. 1120 to Haho and his wife Kauilaʻanapa.

Kauilaʻanapa is also called Kauilaianapu. It was common that chiefs had many names.

Palena was married to his half-sister, Hikawai. Her father was Limaloa-Lialea.

Palena either had one son called Hanalaʻa or twins named Hanalaʻa-nui and Hanalaʻa-iki.
