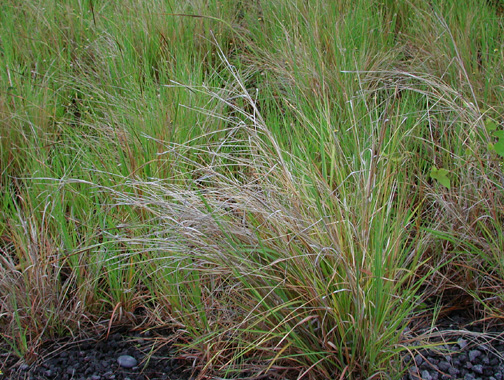

Scientific classification
- Kingdom: Plantae
- Clade: Tracheophytes
- Clade: Angiosperms
- Clade: Monocots
- Clade: Commelinids
- Order: Poales
- Family: Poaceae
- Subfamily: Panicoideae
- Genus: Heteropogon
- Species: H. contortus

Binomial name
- Heteropogon contortus (L.) P.Beauv. ex Roem. & Schult.

Synonyms
- Andropogon contortus L.

= Heteropogon contortus =

Species of plant

Heteropogon contortus is a tropical, perennial tussock grass with a native distribution encompassing Southern Africa, southern Asia, Northern Australia, Oceania, and southwestern North America. The species has also become a naturalised weed in tropical and subtropical regions in the Americas and East Asia. The plant grows to 1.5 metres (4.9 ft) in height and is favoured in most environments by frequent burning. The plants develop characteristic dark seeds with a single long awn at one end and a sharp spike at the other. The awn becomes twisted when dry and straightens when moistened, and in combination with the spike is capable of drilling the seed into the soil.

The species is known by many common names, including black speargrass, tanglehead, steekgras (in Afrikaans) and pili (in Hawaiian, ultimately from Proto-Austronesian *pilit₁ "to adhere/stick"). H. contortus is a valuable pasture species across much of its range. However, it has also been responsible for the elimination of the wool industry over much of Australia due to the seeds becoming embedded in the wool and skin of sheep and devaluing the wool and killing the animals. H. contortus seeds are also responsible for similar injuries in dogs with thick undercoats, or becoming embedded in the socks and skin of hikers.

== Uses ==
Native Hawaiians used pili to thatch hale (houses). Ruler Pilikaʻaiea was named after the grass, and his royal house was Pili line (Hale o Pili).

It is sometimes sucked by Indigenous Australian communities in the Northern Territory for its sweet liquid.

== Gallery ==
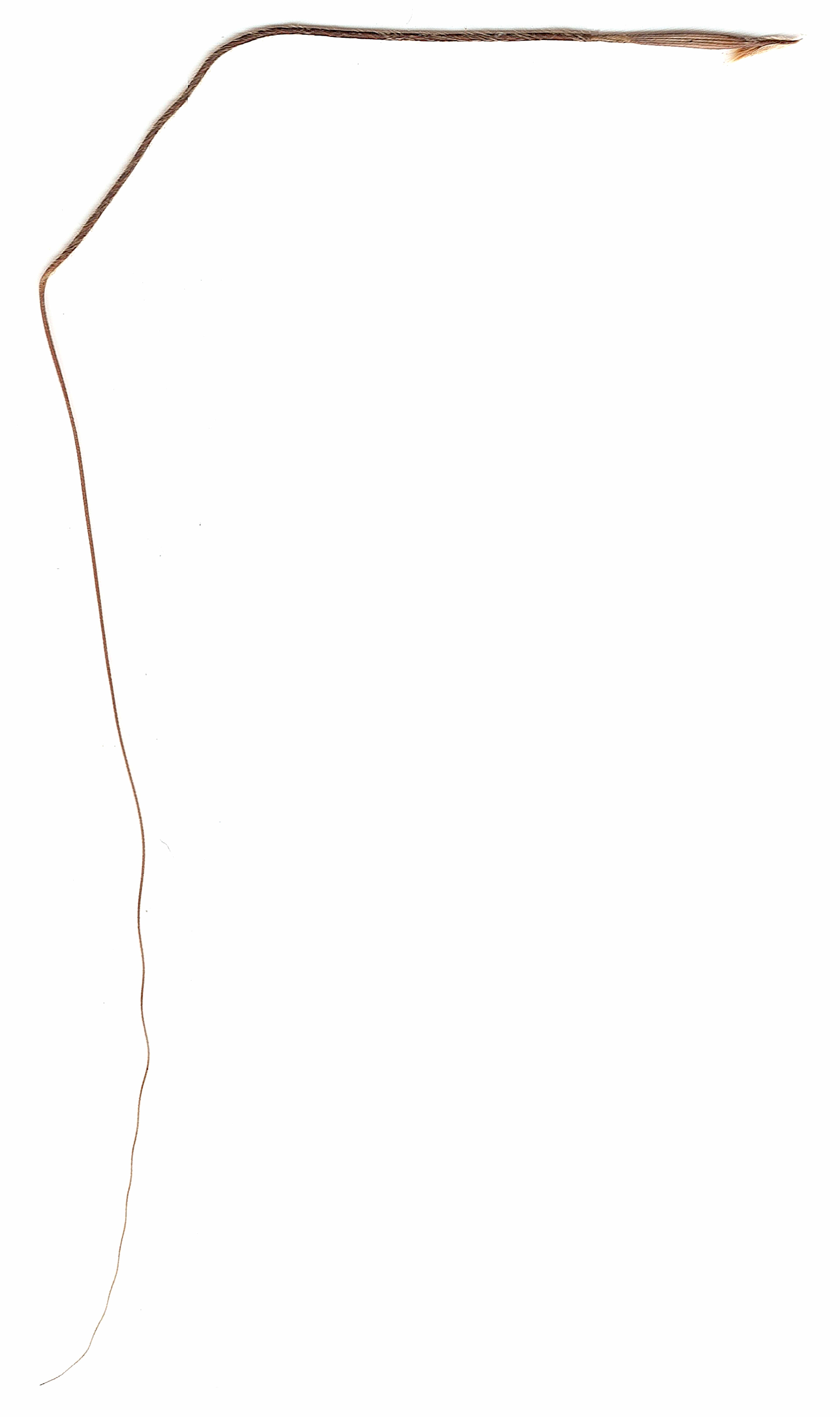
Single seed demonstrating long twisted awn

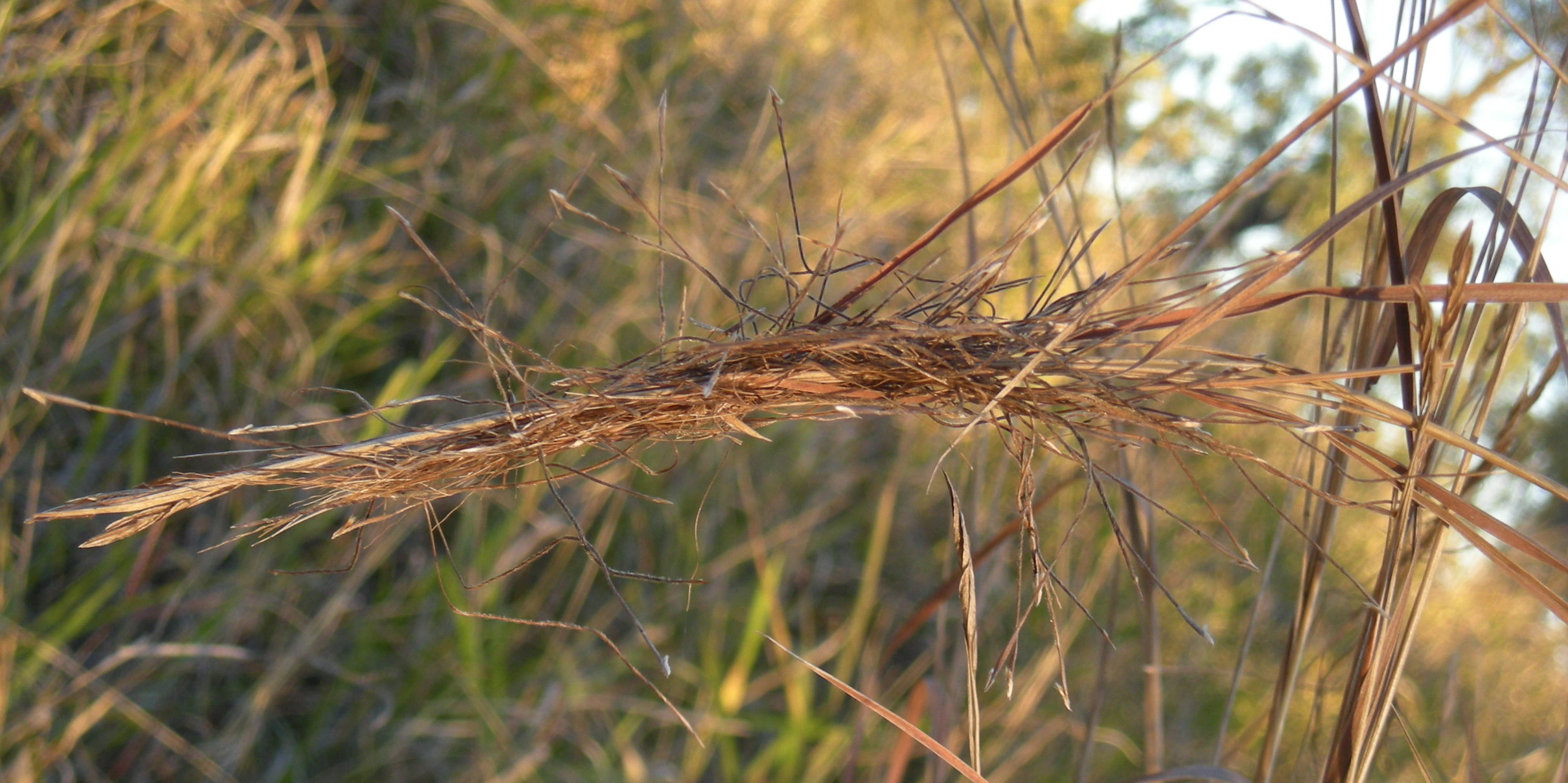
Ripe seedhead

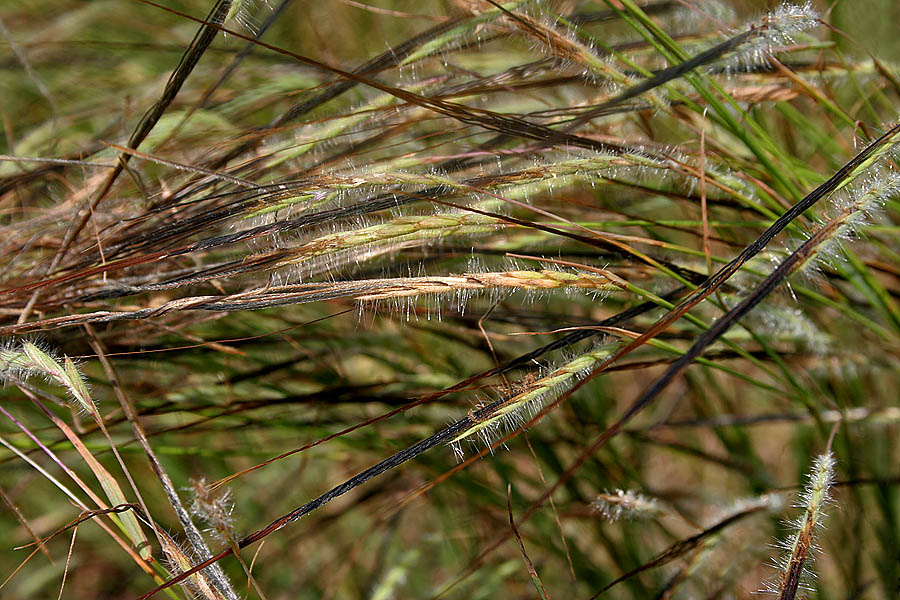
Form

== See also ==
- Mount Huangmao, the highest point in China's Zhejiang province, is named for the plant
