= Paʻao =

Kahuna

Paʻao is a prominent figure in Hawaiian tradition, often regarded as a historical person whose story has been preserved and retold through oral narratives and chants. He is typically described as a kahuna nui (high priest) who arrived in Hawaiʻi from a distant land known as Samoa.

In King Kalākaua's Legends and Myths of Hawaiʻi, he speculated that some Tahitian chiefs—such as Paʻao and Pilikaʻaiea— have ultimately migrated from Samoa. He noted the presence of a village called Upolu on Hawaiʻi Island and suggested it could be named after the Samoan island of the same name, which he took as possible evidence of that connection but also the fact Kaʻu Point was named after one of the Manu'a Islands of Samoa, where voyage had begun after 2,000 years.

Legends suggest that Paʻao introduced certain customs to Hawaiʻi including human sacrifice, primary worship of the god Kū, red feathered girdles called Kāʻei, Kāʻeke drums, and veneration of the bonito fish. He is also said to have brought a "pure" chief to rule over Hawaiʻi, deposing the tyrant and highest ranking chief, Kapawā.

At this time in Hawaiian history, the four island kingdoms were Kauaʻi (Kauaʻi and Niʻihau), Oʻahu, Maui (Maui, Molokaʻi, Lānaʻi, and Kahoʻolawe), and Hawaiʻi. After the overthrow by Pāʻao and Pili, Kapawā fled to the Kingdom of Maui where his royal relatives, through the ancient ʻUlu bloodlines, provided him with shelter and protection. The two bloodlines of Pili (Hawaiʻi) and ʻUlu (Maui) were frequently at war, with the ʻUlu often victorious. It was only under King Kamehameha the Great, a direct descendant of Pili, when Hawaiʻi fully conquered the Kingdom of Maui. Having done so, he achieved unification of the Hawaiian Islands as a single kingdom.

== Documented history of Paʻao ==
The Paʻao stories makes their first documented historical appearance in 1835–1836, in a collection of Hawaiian traditions called Moolelo Hawaiʻi. Compiled by Hawaiian students of Lahainaluna High School on Maui, this was the basis of Sheldon Dibble's 1838 history of Hawaii. David Malo was among the Lahainaluna students collecting oral traditions, continuing such work; when he died in 1854, he had an unreleased manuscript which was later translated into English and published in 1898.

Martha Beckwith, in her Hawaiian Mythology (1940, as republished in 1970), notes these historical sources:

- Emerson, Nathaniel – "The Long Voyages of the Ancient Hawaiians," Hawaiian Historical Society Papers Vol. 5, 1893, pp. 5–13
- Malo, David – Hawaiian Antiquities, as translated by Emerson, 1951 edition, pp. 6–7
- Malo, David – The Mo'olelo Hawai'i, 2022, pp. 75.
- Green, Laura – Folktales from Hawaii, Honolulu, 1928, pp. 120–124
- Kamakau, Samuel M. – article in the Hawaiian newspaper Kuokoa, December 29, 1866
- Thrum, Thomas G. – More Hawaiian Folk Tales, Chicago, 1923, pp. 46–52
- Remy, Jules M. as translated by Brigham – Contributions of a Venerable Savage to the Ancient History of the Hawaiian Islands, Boston, 1868, pp. 10–11
- Westervelt, William D. – Hawaiian Historical Legends, New York, 1923, pp. 65–78
- Kalakaua, David – The Legends and Myths of Hawai'i, New York, 1888, pp. 47–48
- Stokes, John – "Whence Paao?" Hawaiian Historical Society Papers Vol. 15, Honolulu 1928, pp. 40–45

The Paʻao story also survives in various oral traditions passed down through Native Hawaiian families. Some Hawaiians insist on the purity and reliability of these traditions, but academic scholars believe that much from these traditions have been shaped by easily available published versions of the narrative.

However, there is no reason to doubt that the Paʻao story was widespread in pre-contact times. A lineage of Hawaiian high priests claimed descent from Paʻao, and Hawaiian high chiefs from the Big Island of Hawaiʻi traced their genealogies to Pili-kaaiea (Pili), the "pure" chief brought by Paʻao. Paʻao is said to have introduced human sacrifice, the walled heiau, the red feather girdle, the pūloʻuloʻu kapu staves, the prostrating kapu, the veneration of aku fish, and the feather god Tairi. The Paʻao narrative therefore justified and sanctioned the social order as it then existed.

== Narrative as found in Malo ==
It is said that a number of people sailed here from Kahiki, Pa'ao and Makuakau-mana and some others with them. As their compass to sail, they used the stars. Pa'ao stayed in Kohala, while Makuakaumana returned to Kahiki.Pa'ao arrived in Hawaii at the time that Lonokawai was the ruler of Hawaii. That was the sixteenth generation of ruling ali i after Kapawa. 10. Pa'ao lived in Kohala until the time that the ali'i [pl.] of Hawaii acted hewa [incorrectly]. Then Pa'ao went and got an ali'i from Kahiki-Pili was the name of that ali'i who sailed back with him-and installed him among the ranks of the ali'i of Hawaii. 11. It is thought that Pa'ao sailed from Kapu'a in Kona. He sailed by canoe, but nothing is said about the kind of canoe. When Pili sailed to Hawaii, Pa'ao came back with him, and Makuakaumana and some others too. The name of Pili's canoe was Kanaloamuia, but it is not stated whether it was a pahi [i.e., a Tahitian canoe].8 12. It is also said that during Pili's voyage, two kinds of fish came along with him, the opelu [mackerel scad] and the aku [skipjack tuna]. When the ocean got rough from the wind, the aku crowded (about the canoe] and the opelu agitated [the surface of the water], making the wind gentle and the ocean very calm. In that way, Pili and his people were able to sail on until they landed their canoe in Hawaii. That is why the aku and the opelu were subject to kapu [restricted in their use] in former times. On Pili's arrival, he became ruler of Hawaii. He is an ancestor of the ali'i of Hawaii.
–David Malo, The Mo'olelo Hawai'i, 2022 edition, p. 75.

== Narrative in greater detail ==
The main outlines of the story follow. Many details vary from version to version. In one version told by British missionary William Ellis in 1826 Paʻao was a white chief.

Paʻao is said to have been a priest and a master navigator. He lived on a distant island called Kahiki in the oldest versions, and identified as either Tahiti or Samoa by believers in the historicity of the narrative.

His older brother, Lonopele, was the chief priest in some versions of the story, or the ruler of the island in others. Lonopele accused Paʻao's son of removing some kapu fish from the royal fishpond, or with stealing fruit. Paʻao was angry at his brother's persecution and in his anger, he killed his own son and ripped open the corpse's stomach, showing that there were no remnants of kapu fish or of fruit, in another version these partially digested foods were found.

Paʻao brooded over his misfortunes and decided to migrate to a distant land, far from his brother. He readied three large canoes for the voyage. He placed a kapu over the boats; no one was to touch the canoes without his permission. One evening, Paʻao discovered his nephew, the son of Lonopele, touching one of the sacred canoes. Paʻao killed his nephew and buried him in the sand under one of the canoes, which was elevated on blocks. Flies buzzed around the decomposing corpse, so the canoe was named Ka-nalo-a-muia, "the buzzing of flies."

Paʻao hurriedly assembled his retainers, launched the voyaging canoes, and departed. He left in such a hurry that one of his followers, an aged priest or prophet named Makuakaumana, was left behind. Makuakaumana climbed a cliff and called out to Paʻao; Paʻao refused to stop, saying that the canoes were full, all save the projection of the stern. Makuakaumana leapt from the cliff and gained his position in the canoe.

Paʻao sailed by the stars until they reached the Big Island of Hawaii. They landed in Puna, where Paʻao built the stone temple platform, or heiau, of Aha-ula, or Red Mouth. This was the first luakini heiau in Hawaii, the first heiau where human sacrifices were offered. He is also said to have landed in Kohala, on the opposite side of the island, and built the famous heiau of Mo'okini.

Paʻao believed that the chiefs of Hawaiʻi had become hewa, or degraded, by indiscriminate intermarriage with lesser chiefs and commoners. He is said to have returned to his home island to fetch a chief of impeccable ancestry. He asked Lono-ka-eho, or Lono, who refused, and then recruited Pili-kaaiea, or Pili. Paʻao and Pili, along with Piliʻs sister Hina-au-kekele, chiefs and warriors, and their families, returned to Hawaiʻi, where Pili became the new high chief.

== Lineages of Paʻao and Pili ==
All the succeeding chiefs of the island claimed descent from the legendary Pili. Paʻao's descendants became priests, and their line or order, called Holaʻe, continued into historical times. The last high priest, Hewahewa, who acquiesced to Christianity and the breaking of the kapus or ʻAi Noa in 1819, claimed descent from Paʻao.

== Historicity ==
Until fairly recently, Hawaiian historians relied primarily on recorded oral history and comparative linguistics and ethnology. The "two migrations" theory was widely accepted. That is, in a first migration, Polynesians (specifically, Marquesans) settled the Hawaiian islands. In the second migration, Tahitians came north, conquered the original settlers, and established stratified chiefdoms.

Hawaiian archaeology then came into its own and sought material evidence for two migrations. Evidence is found of migrations that originated from the S. China Sea - Lapita (Kirsch, 1999). Then later, followed by migrations that originated from the E. Pacific i.e. Galapagos and Easter Island, which traversed a mostly submerged archipelago pathway leading directly into Tahiti. Thor Heyerdahl theorized that Polynesians originated from S. America and drifted to Hawai'i by luck, but this was debunked chiefly by the Polynesian Voyaging Society, who showed that non-instrumental navigation was practical. However, there is some evidence that supported Heyerdahl's incorrect theory: Sweet potato and coconut originated from the E. Pacific. These along with sugar cane, that originated in India, are among several Hawaiian crops that are now termed "canoe plants"; they were extremely important to voyaging way-finders i.e. Paʻao, who migrated to Hawaii. Furthermore, war implements of S. America, which were not typical in the W. Pacific, strongly resembled the Hawaiian ʻihe (spear), mahiʻole (war helmet) and ahaʻula (cape of royalty).

Many Native Hawaiians and scholars who have studied the narratives believe the Paʻao narrative contains elements of actual history, and reflects a literal wave of migration from the south. The Polynesian Voyaging Society's undertakings, such as Hōkūleʻa canoe's voyages, indicate the feasibility of long voyages in ancient Polynesian canoes and the reliability of celestial navigation; these demonstrations show that the types of voyaging mentioned in the Pa'ao stories were indeed feasible, but the recreated voyages do little to prove the authenticity of the Pa'ao legends.

Hawaiian attitudes towards the high chiefs have changed; the ancient high chiefs are often seen today as oppressors, invaders who descended upon a peaceful and egalitarian Hawaiian population. Activists praise these pre-Paʻao days as the real Hawaiian past, to be revived and reenacted in the present, and vilify Paʻao as a source of Hawaiian problems. In this version, all the problems faced by Native Hawaiians can be traced to foreign interference.

== See also ==
- Ancient Hawaii

== Sources ==
- Malo, David, Hawaiian Antiquities, as translated by Emerson, 1951 edition, Bishop Museum Press
- Beckwith, Martha; Hawaiian Mythology, 1940, as republished in 1970, University of Hawaii Press
