= Laʻakapu =

Chiefess

Laʻakapu of Hawaiʻi
- Spouse: Chief Kahoukapu
- Children: Chief Kauholanuimahu

Laʻakapu was an ancient Hawaiian noble lady and a High Chiefess of the Big Island (Hawaiʻi) as a wife of Kahoukapu, Aliʻi Nui of Hawaiʻi. She was the mother of the High Chief Kauholanuimahu, who succeeded his father.

== Biography ==
Lady Laʻakapu was born in ancient Hawaiʻi as a daughter of Huanuikeʻekeʻehilani and Keomahuʻilani (Ke-ō-mahuʻi-lani). Laʻakapu had two siblings. According to the famous historian Samuel Kamakau, Laʻakapu was a descendant of the nobleman Kila.

=== Chiefess of Hawaiʻi ===
Laʻakapu married High Chief Kahoukapu of Hawaiʻi, who was the grandson of the famous Chief Kalaunuiohua. The son of Laʻakapu and Kahoukapu was the High Chief Kauholanuimahu, who became a ruler of his island after his father's death. Through him, Laʻakapu was an ancestress of many nobles and chiefs.

There is a famous legend about Laʻakapu and the birth of Kauholanuimahu. According to this old legend, she was unable to produce a child, so she asked the priest for the solution, and he told her that she need to catch a certain species of fish. Laʻakapu could not please the priest two times, and when she lost her patience, priest finally told her which kind of fish he wants. Priest performed a ritual, and he sacrificed the fish. This time, after Laʻakapu slept with Kahoukapu, she bore a son.

=== Other marriages ===
Other consorts of Laʻakapu were Kanalukapu and Lanakukahahauula. Children of Laʻakapu by Kanalukapu:

- Hilo (son)
- Kapulaʻa (daughter)

Lanakukahahauula and Laʻakapu had a daughter, Lulanalomakukahahauula, who had three children.

It is not known when did Laʻakapu die.
