= Paumakua =

Hawaiian chief of Maui

- Other names: Paumakua-a-Huanuiʻikalailai; Paunuikuakaolokea
- Title: Aliʻi Nui of Maui
- Spouse: Manokalililani
- Children: Haho of Maui
- Parent(s): Huanuiekalaiaʻilaʻikai (father); Kapoea (mother)

Paumakua is a name of one ancient chief who lived in ancient Hawaii and was Alii nui of Maui. He is described in legends as a ruler of the island of Maui. His genealogy is given in ancient chant Kumulipo.

Because of his father, he is also known as Paumakua-a-Huanuiʻikalailai or also Paunuikuakaolokea as found in the Kumulipo.

He was an ancestor of many kings of Maui and is believed that he never had any control over any significant portion of Maui. He was a descendant of Hemā of the Ulu line.

It is mentioned by Abraham Fornander that Paumakua probably did not arrive on Maui earlier than the time of his father. He is also mentioned by physician Nathaniel B. Emerson.

== Family ==
Father of Paumakua was Chief Huanuiekalaiaʻilaʻikai (otherwise known as Huanuiʻikalaʻilaʻi), who was born on Oahu as a son of Chief Paunuikaikeanaina and his wife Kapohaʻakia.

Mother of Paumakua was called Kapoea or Kapola, and she was born c. 1010.

Of Paumakua himself little is to tell. Of his brother Kuheailani, nothing remarkable has been retain upon Hawaiian traditions. Kuheailaniʻs son Hakalanilea appear to have become the lord of some lands in the Hilo district of Hawaiʻi.

Paumakua married his sister Manokalililani and their son was King Haho of Maui.

Preceded by First	Moʻi of Maui	Succeeded by Haho
