= Kohala Historical Sites State Monument =

Historic Place in Hawaii County, Hawaii

- Moʻokini Heiau
- U.S. National Register of Historic Places
- U.S. National Historic Landmark
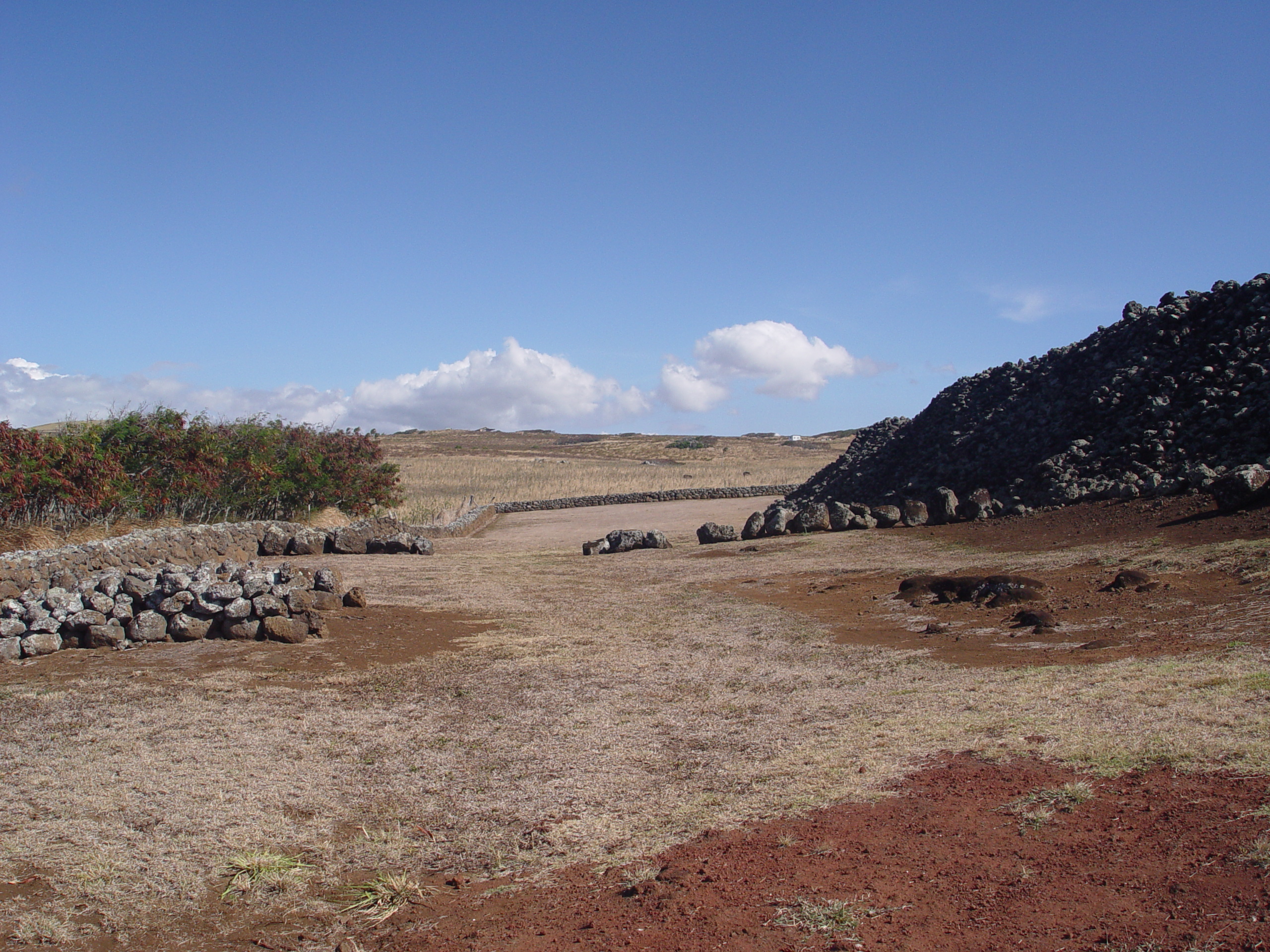

- Location within Hawaii
- Nearest city: Hawi
- Coordinates: 20°15′26″N 155°52′36″W
- Area: 116 acres (47 ha)
- Built: 1370
- Architect: Kuamo'o Mo'okini; Paʻao
- Architectural style: Ancient Hawaiian
- NRHP reference No.: 66000284

Significant dates
- Added to NRHP: October 15, 1966
- Designated NHL: December 29, 1962

Kohala Historical Sites State Monument includes the National Historic Landmark Moʻokini Heiau and the birthplace of Kamehameha I. It is located in remote North Kohala on the Island of Hawaiʻi.

== History ==
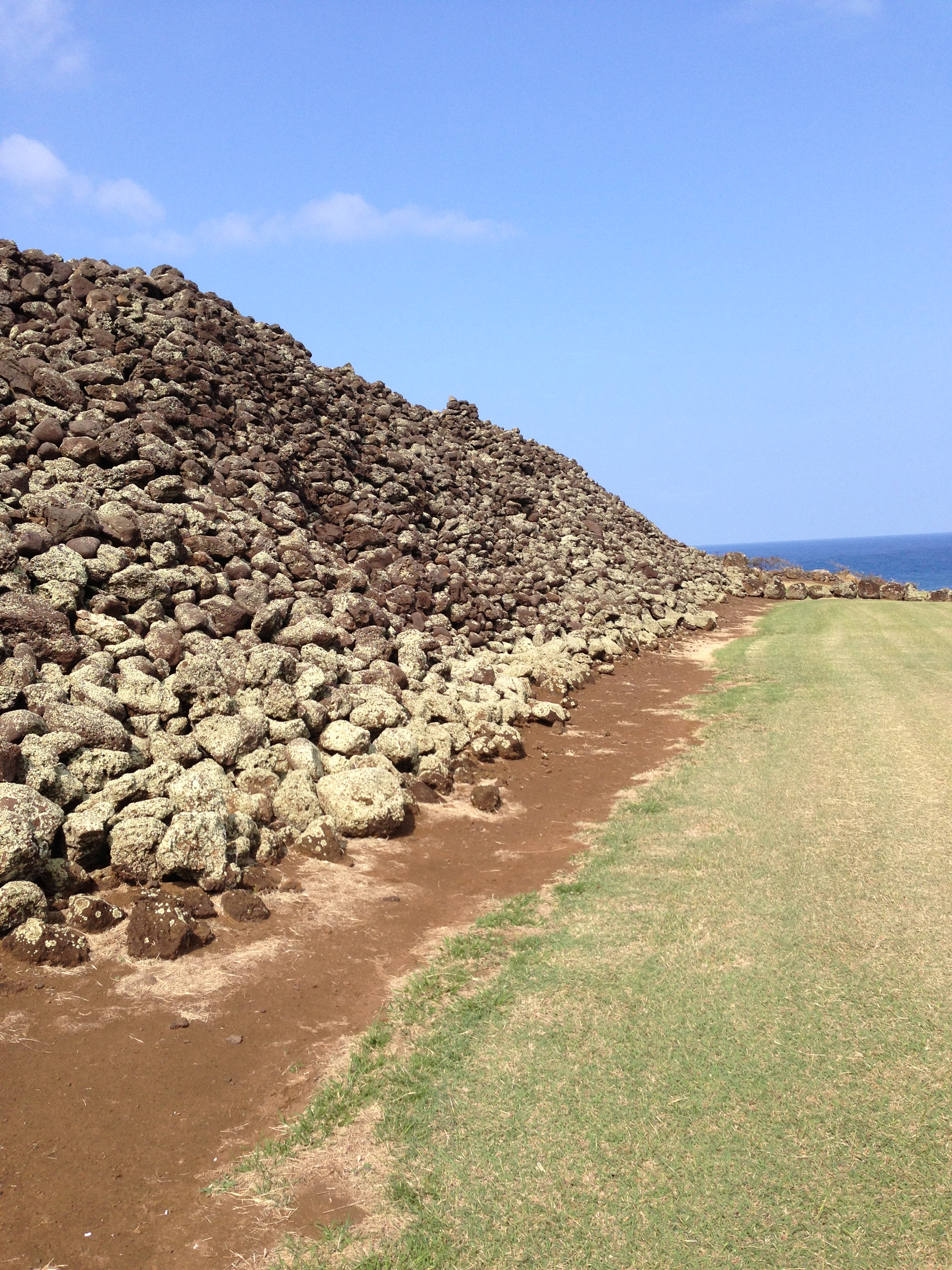
One of Mo'okini Heaiau's rock walls.

Moʻokini Heiau is one of the oldest historical sites in Hawaiʻi and among its most sacred. Moʻokini means "many lineages" or "many Moʻo" in the Hawaiian Language. Moʻo are large reptile goddesses honored by Hawaiians since before the time of Paʻao.

This heiau is a living spiritual temple and not just an historic artifact of the Hawaiian culture. Oral histories indicate the original temple on the site may be 1500 years old: the genealogy chant of the heiau's kahuna tells of Kuamo'o Mo'okini arriving here in 480, not from Samoa or Tahiti, but from the Persian Gulf of Middle East. Evidence suggests the current temple was built on the site of this smaller older one by Paʻao, who brought the Hawaiian Religion to the islands sometime between 1100 and 1300 A.D.

The current site includes the remains of the heiau measuring 250' x 130' with an open stone paved court enclosed by 20'-high stone walls, and the sacrificial stone. The heiau is constructed of stones that are said to have been passed from hand to hand from the Pololū Valley, over 12 miles (19 km) away. One tradition states that the heiau was completed by the menehune (mythical Hawai'ian little people) in one night.

For centuries a strict set of rules (kapu) were enforced at the heiau. It was a closed heiau reserved exclusively for the Aliʻi Nui (the highest chiefs) for praying and offering human sacrifices, primarily to the war god Kū. In Kohala Moʻokini Heiau was the focus of religious life and order. In November 1978 Kahuna Nui Leimomi Moʻokini Lum rededicated the Moʻokini Luakini to the "Children of the Land" (kama ʻaina) and lifted the restrictive kapu. In doing this she made the site safe for all persons to enter the heiau and created a place of learning for future generations to discover the past. Her family has been taking care of the temple for centuries.

A few hundred yards away is Kamehameha Akahi ʻĀina Hānau, the birthplace of Kamehameha the Great. He is said to have been born here in 1758 as Halley's Comet passed overhead. The entrance to the site is on the south side. A rock is said to mark the precise place of the birth of Kamehameha.

== Location ==
Kohala Historical Sites State Monument can only be reached by a dirt road from Upolu Airport and is located about 1½ miles off the Akoni Pule Highway. Turn North on Upolu Point road near the town of Hawi, and West at the small air strip. A four-wheel drive vehicle is recommended, especially if it has been raining. The birthplace includes a sign and enclosure located at coordinates 20°15′20″N 155°52′58″W.

The Heiau was declared a National Historic Landmark on December 29, 1962, and added to the National Register of Historic Places in 1966 as site 66000284. A clear day provides a striking view of Maui.

== Mahukona Heiau and Kukuipahu Heiau ==
Near Mo'okini Heiau are two other smaller heiaus whose access is limited. Mahukona Heiau, dedicated to Lono god, nine miles from Mo'okini, rises from a steep hillside. Navigators used to be trained here, in an open air setting where night skies, off-shore clouds, winds and ocean currents could be studied, to pursue voyages across the vast expanse of the Pacific Ocean. Kukuipahu Heiau, dedicated to Kāne god, is located in the Kohala Mountains. It is one of the three heiaus that formed a spiritual triangle in North Kohala, with heiaus dedicated to Ku, Lono and Kāne.
