= Lonomai =

Chief (13th century?) of Maui and son of Kanemokuhealiʻi

Lonomai (Lono-Mai) (born ca. 1232 according to one chronology) was a nobleman and High Chief of Maui, a Hawaiian island. His names appear in the ancient chants of Maui.

It is believed he was born in 1232, according to the "Ulu genealogy“. Lonomai is also called Lonomaikalewa (Lono-mai-kalewa).

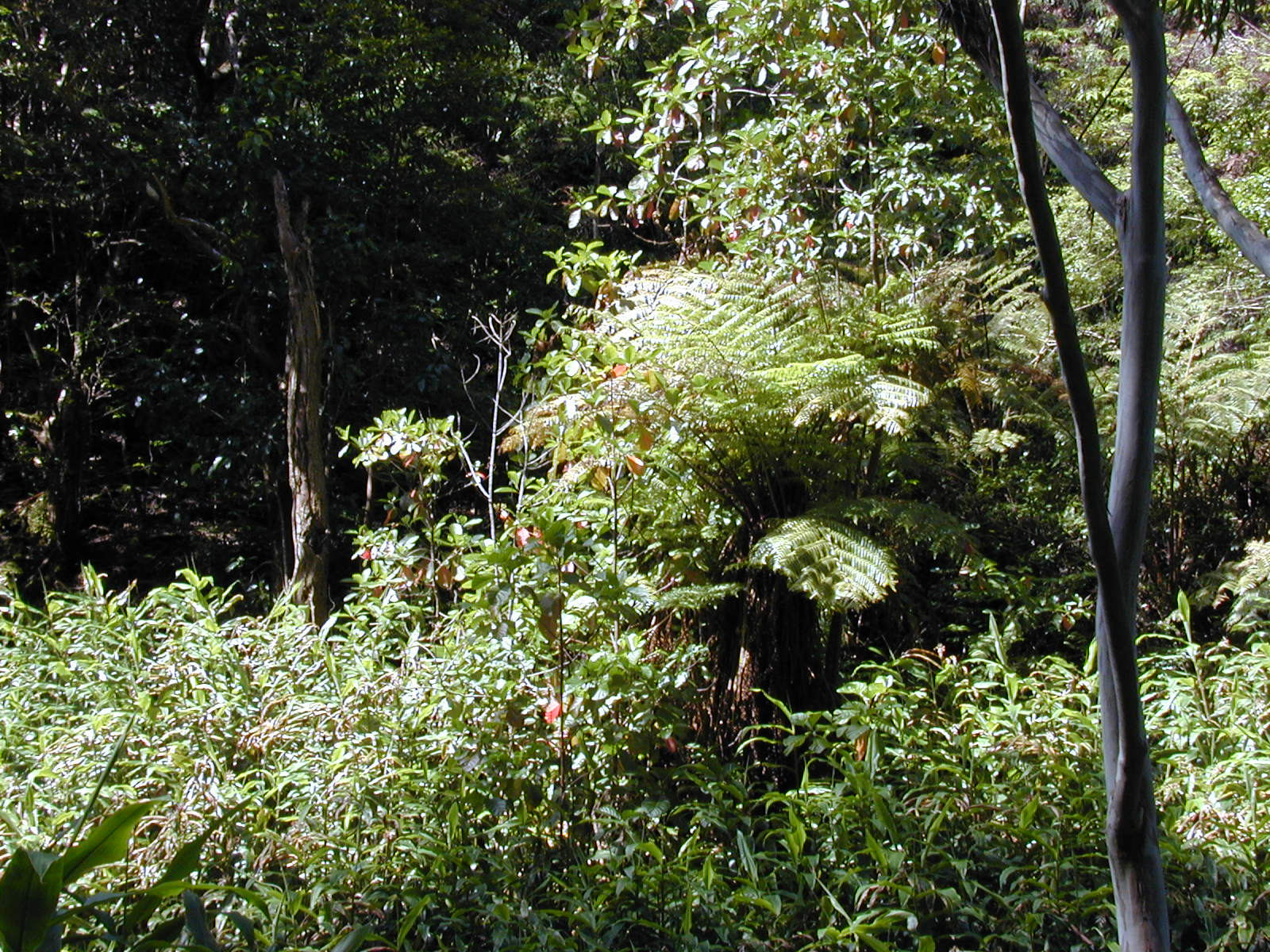
Lonomai ruled over Maui.

His father was high chief Kanemokuhealiʻi of Maui, whilst Lonomaiʻs mother was lady Keikauhale, who became a chiefess by marriage to Lonomai's father. Lonomai was named after god Lono, an important deity in the Hawaiian religion.

== Marriage ==
Lonomai was married to the woman called Kolu, who became a Maui consort; the couple had at least one child, Chief Wakalana. Ancient legends mention Wakalana a lot, describing his encounter with the foreign people, and his rule over Wailuku.
