= Kukohou =

Hawaiian high chief

- Spouse: Hineuki (half-sister)
- Issue: Kaniuhu
- Father: Loʻe
- Mother: Hinamaileliʻi
- Religion: Hawaiian religion

Kukohou (or Kukohoa) was High Chief of the Island of Hawaiʻi in ancient Hawaii. His title was Aliʻi Nui — "Chief of the island". His famous descendant was King Kamehameha I.

A member of the Pili line, Kukohou was son of Loʻe and his wife, Hinamaileliʻi, and he succeeded his great-grandfather Pilikaʻaiea. Wife of Kukohou was his half-sister Hineuki (Hina-keʻuki). Their son was named Kaniuhu, and he ruled after Kukohouʻs death.

Preceded by Pilikaʻaiea	Aliʻi of Hawaiʻi	Succeeded by Kaniuhu

== Bibliography ==
- Abraham Fornander. An Account of the Polynesian Race: Its Origin and Migrations. Charles E. Tuttle Company. 1969.
- David Malo. Hawaiian Antiquities. Bishop Museum Press. 1951.
