= Haho of Maui =

Hawaiian High Chief (born c. 1098)

Haho
- Spouse: Kauilaʻanapa
- Children: Palena of Maui
- Parent(s): Paumakua of Maui; Manokalililani

Haho (born c. 1098 in Hawaii) was an ancient Hawaiian High Chief (Aliʻi), who was a ruler of Maui. He is mentioned in legends and old chants and is also called Hoaho.

== Family ==
Haho was a son of Paumakua of Maui and High Chiefess Manokalililani, who was a daughter of Chiefess Hoʻohokukalani II (named after the goddess Hoʻohokukalani) and sister of Paumakua.

He married High Chiefess Kauilaʻanapa (also called Kauilaianapu in chants). Their son was Palena of Maui and his daughter-in-law was Hikawai-Nui, who was a daughter of Kauilaʻanapa and her other husband, Limaloa-Lialea.

Haho and his son are mentioned in chant Kumulipo.

== Legacy ==
Haho was remembered as the founder of the Aha-Aliʻi, an institution which literally means "the congregation of chiefs".

Preceded by Paumakua of Maui	Moʻi of Maui	Succeeded by Palena of Maui
