= Allowance =

Allowance may refer to:

- Allowance (engineering), a planned deviation between two dimensions
- Allowance (money), an amount of money given at regular intervals for a specific purpose
- Allowance for bad debts in accounting
- Carbon emission trading as an economic tool in climate change mitigation
  - Emissions trading for pollutants in general

== See also ==
- Welfare spending, a type of government support to ensure members of a society can meet basic human needs
- Allowance system, a 19th-century system of poor relief in Britain
- Allowance race, in North American horse racing
- Baggage allowance, the amount of baggage allowed per passenger
- EU Allowance in the European Union Emission Trading Scheme
- Personal allowance in the United Kingdom's taxing system
- Seam allowance in sewing
