= Kanemokuhealiʻi =

High Chief in ancient Hawaii

Kanemokuhealiʻi (Kanemokuheliʻi) was a High Chief of Maui, one of the Hawaiian islands. Itʻs unknown when Kanemokuhealiʻi was born. Kanemokuhealiʻi's name contains the word aliʻi, "chief".

Kanemokuhealiʻi's parents were Chief Alau of Maui and Lady Moeiekana, whilst Kanemokuhealiʻi's grandfather was Mauiloa. According to the chants, Kanemokuhealiʻi ruled after his father and was a descendant of Haho of Maui, an early chief of the island.

Wife of Kanemokuhealiʻi was Keikauhale and the couple had son, Lonomai, named after Lono the god.
