= Hina-au-kekele =

Hawaiian noble lady and Chiefess

Hina-au-kekele Lady of the Big Island
Father	Laʻau
Mother	Kukamolimolialoha
Consort	Pilikaʻaiea (brother)

Hina-au-kekele (also known as Hina-ʻau-aku, Hinauapu or simply Hina) was a Hawaiian noble lady and Chiefess of the Island of Hawaiʻi (Big Island). She was the sister-wife of the High Chief Pilikaaiea of Hawaiʻi, and they were the founders of the dynasty named Pili line (Hawaiian: Hale o Pili).

== Biography ==
Hina was born on Tahiti as the daughter of the Hawaiian nobleman Laʻau and his sister-wife, the noble lady Kukamolimaulialoha (Kukamolimolialoha). It is unknown why her father and mother went to Tahiti. Hina's grandfather was the High Chief Lanakawai of Hawaiʻi (a descendant of Ulu). Hina was named after the goddess Hina.

The brother of Hina was Pilikaʻaiea, who is often simply known as Pili. They were married, and their sexual union was considered sacred, according to the Hawaiian customs and laws. Their children were:

- Koa (Ko) — a son
- Hinaʻauamai — a daughter (also named after Hina) and the wife of her brother

Hina and Pilikaaiea came to Hawaii together with the wizard Paʻao, and Pilikaʻaiea became a successor of Kapawa. Pilikaʻaiea and Hina were the ancestors of Pilikaaieaʻs successor, Chief Kukohou (died 1185).

== See also ==
- Hina (chiefess)
- Hina (goddess)
- The dictionary definition of Hina at Wiktionary
