= Heiau =

Hawaiian temple

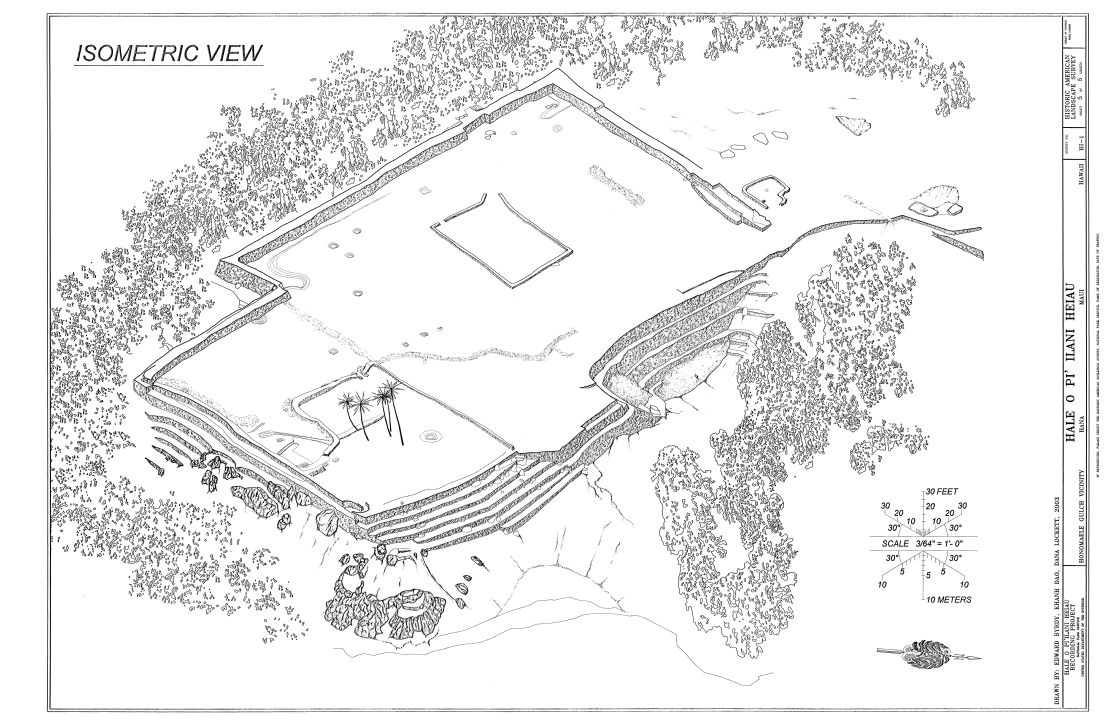
Hale O Pi'ilani Heiau, near Hāna on Maui

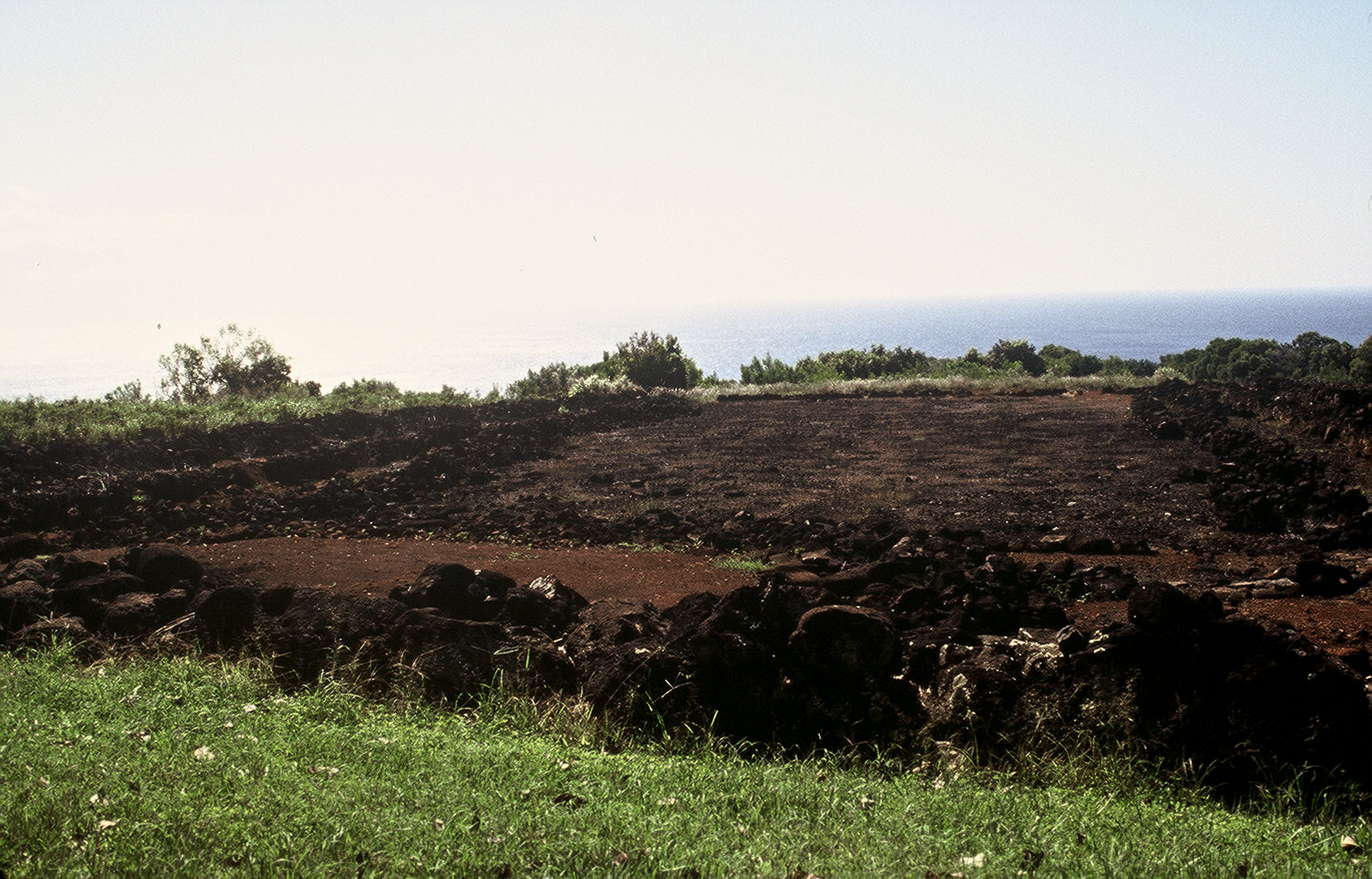
Pu'u O Mahuka Heiau

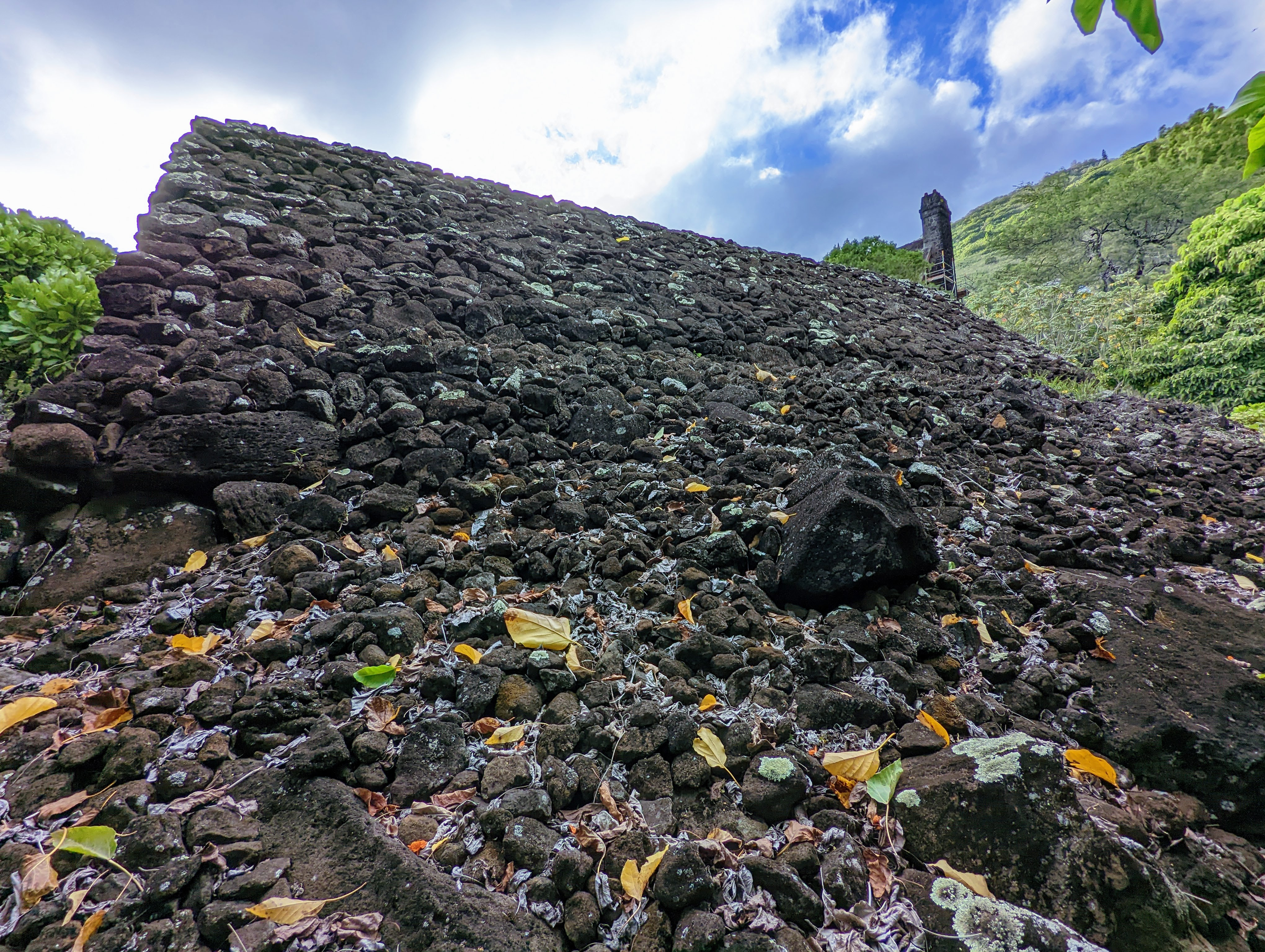
Heiau, Mānoa Heritage Center, Honolulu, Hawaii, 2022-1025

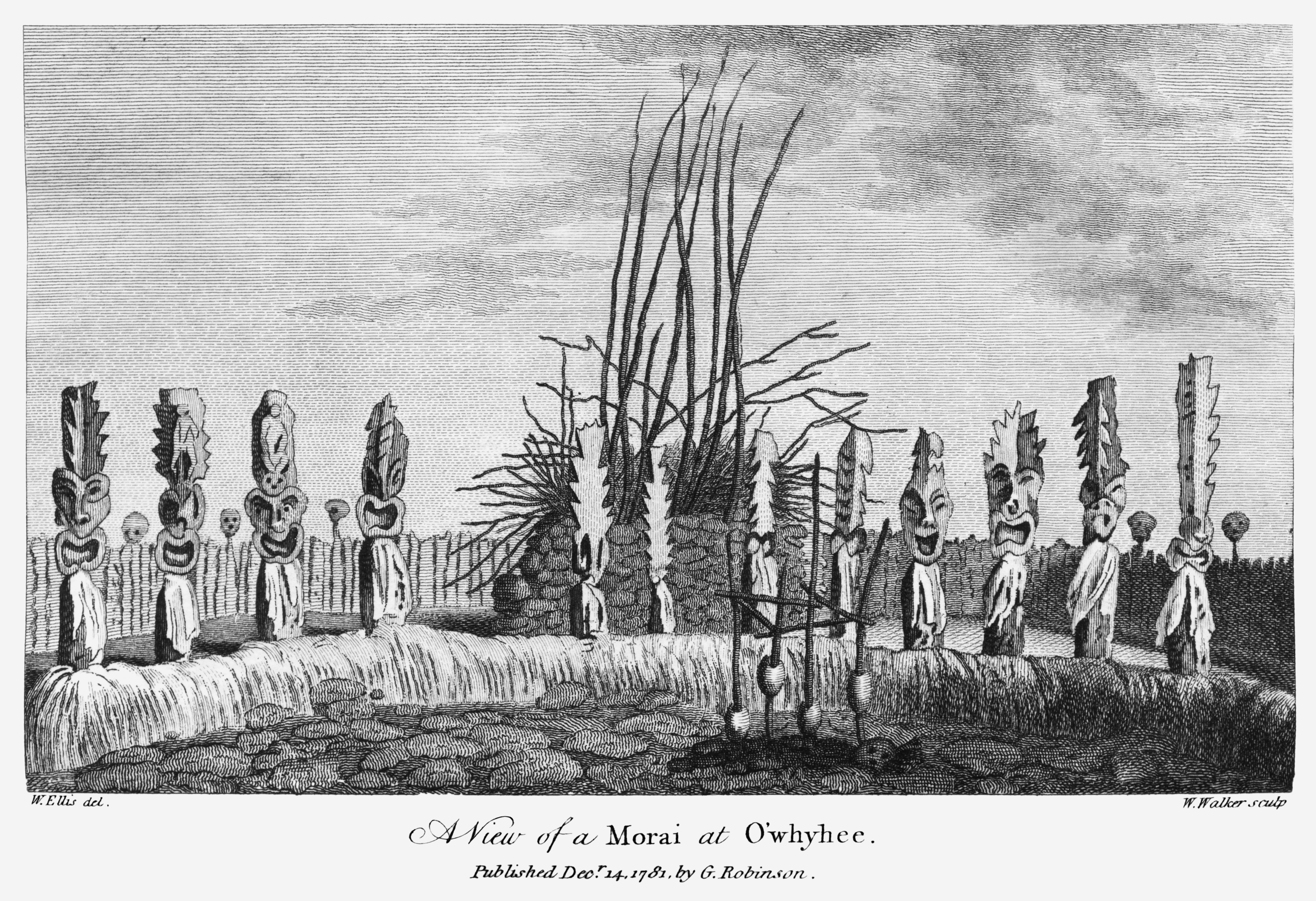
An illustration of a heiau at Kealakekua Bay at the time of James Cook's third voyage, by William Ellis

A heiau (/ˈheɪ.aʊ/ HAY-ow, Hawaiian: [hejˈjɐw]) is a Hawaiian temple. Made in different architectural styles depending upon their purpose and location, they range from simple earth terraces, to elaborately constructed stone platforms. There are heiau to treat the sick (heiau hōʻola), offer first fruits, offer first catch, start rain, stop rain, increase the population, ensure the health of the nation, achieve success in distant voyaging, reach peace, and achieve success in war (luakini).

Only the luakini was dedicated through human sacrifice. There are two types of luakini. They were called the ʻohiʻa ko and hakuʻohiʻa.

After the official end of Hawaiian religion in 1819 and with later pressure from Christian missionaries (who first arrived in 1820), many were deliberately destroyed, while others were left into disrepair. Heiau are still considered sacred by many of the inhabitants of Hawaii, and some are not open to the public. In ancient times, only chiefs and priests were allowed into some of these heiau. There are even stories from Hawaiian folklore attributing the creation of these temples to the menehunes, a group of legendary dwarf people. Some heiau structures have been fully restored physically and are operated in the 21st century as public attractions.

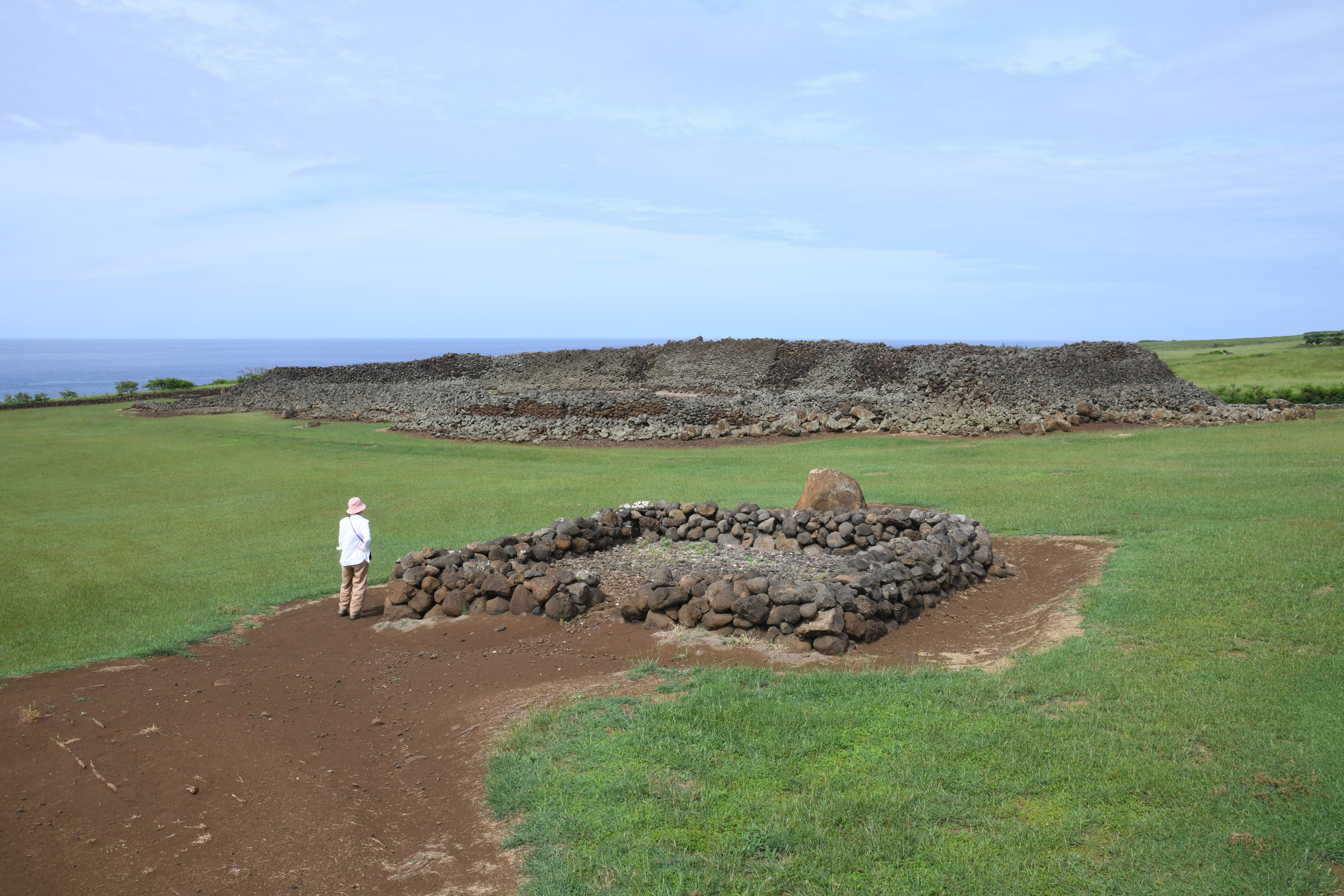
The ruins of Mo'okini Heiau on Big Island

== Architecture ==
Heiau were made in different shapes depending upon their purpose, varying from simple stone markers to large stone platforms and often included high stacked stone walls surrounding an open central enclosure. Their shapes could be rectangular, square, or rounded. Some consisted of simple earth terraces, while others were elaborately constructed stone platforms. They could be placed on hills, cliffs, level earth, valleys and on the coastline touching the sea. Some koʻa or fishing shrines were built underwater. Heiau of the people varied in size. Large heiau were built by prominent people while small heiau were built by the humble.

US missionary Hiram Bingham described a heiau he saw on route hiking between the summits of Mauna Kea and Hualalai. Made of piled lava rock, it was a square of 100 feet (30 m), with walls eight feet high and four feet thick (2.5 by 1.3m). A doorway led through the middle of the north wall. Eight pyramids surrounded the outside of the temple. Made also of piled lava rock, they were 12 feet (3.7 m) in diameter and 12 to 15 feet (4.6 m) high.

== Heiau types ==
The luakini poʻokanaka were large heiaus. Only the Aliʻi nui of an island or moku could use this type of heiau. Other chiefs or the makaʻainana that built this type of heiau were considered rebels. This type of heiau was usually built alongside coastlines, in the interior of the land, or on mountain sides. The largest heiau on Oahu is Puʻu O Mahuka, which covers almost two acres of land. This heiau was not only used for religious purposes. It was also used to track fire signals from the Wailua Complex of Heiaus on Kauai.

An older form of heiau is preserved on Nīhoa and Necker Island. This form is typically referred to as marae as these structures more closely resemble structures referred to by similar names elsewhere in Polynesia and in general were replaced by the more common form visible in the rest of the island chain today after the abandonment of those islands. In general, maraes in Hawaii are represented by stone platforms, sometimes tiered, with stone uprights typically located near the edges of the platform or tier.

== Preserved sites ==
The heiau most commonly preserved are war temples of the later period of history (e.g. Pu'ukohola Heiau National Historic Site). They are composed of large stone platforms with various structures built upon them. The structures were used to house priests, sacred ceremonial drums, sacred items, and cult images (kiʻi) representing the gods associated with that particular temple. There were also altars (Ahu) on which to offer sacrifices (plant, animal and human). The heiau were sacred places; only the kahuna (priests) and certain sacred ali'i (high chiefs) were allowed to enter.

The largest heiau known to exist, Hale O Pi'ilani Heiau, is a massive, three-acre (12,000-square-meter) platform with fifty-foot retaining walls, located in Hāna on Maui. Built for Pi'ilani, it dates to the 13th century.

Agricultural heiau, called generally Hale-o-Lono for the god of fertility, can be found today on Oʻahu at Makaha (Kaneaki heiau - fully restored) and in Hawaii Kai (Pahua heiau - partially restored). The Kaneaki heiau was built in the 17th century, containing grass and thatched huts that were chambers used for prayer and meditation.

The ruins of a healing heiau, Keaiwa ("the mysterious"), are located at the entrance to Keaiwa State Park in ʻAiea.

Puʻuhonua o Honaunau, in South Kona on the island of Hawaiʻi, is a place of refuge. It incorporates a heiau complex within it.

Because the land of heiau was sacred, it was not unusual for successive generations to add to original structures and the heiau purpose could change over time. An example is Ulupo heiau in Kailua on Oʻahu, which is said to have been built by the menehune, that is, a long time ago. It is thought to have been used first as an agricultural heiau and later as a luakini.

== Destruction ==
The kapu or 'ʻai kapu system was abolished in October 1819 by Kamehameha II (Liholiho). The abolition of the kapu system ended the use of heiau as places of worship and sacrifice. A period referred to as the 'Ai Noa or "free eating" followed. Missionaries arrived in 1820, and most of the aliʻi converted to Christianity, including Kaʻahumanu and Keōpūolani.

It took 11 years for Kaʻahumanu to proclaim laws against indigenous religious practices. All heiau were officially abandoned; most were destroyed over the years. Often they were broken up and plowed under to make way for fields of sugar cane. However, some of the families who were responsible for the heiau have continued the tradition of caring for them.

== List ==
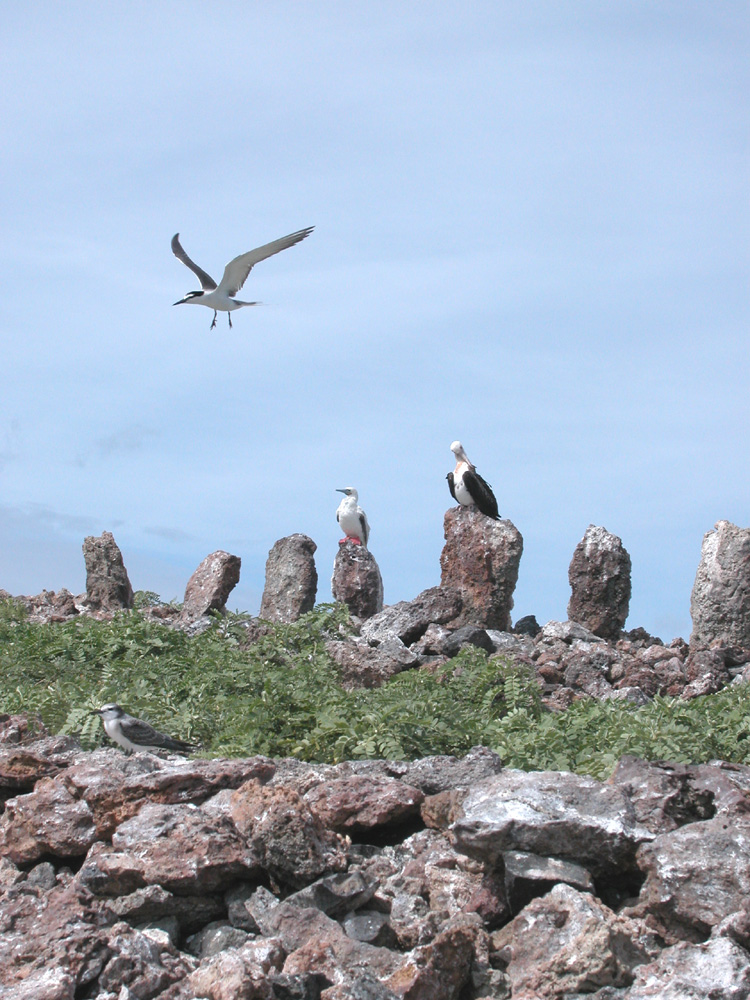
Heiau on Necker Island (Mokumanamana), Northwestern Hawaiian Islands

Hawaii

- ʻAhuʻena Heiau
- Hale o Kapuni Heiau
- Mailekini Heiau
- Moʻokini Heiau
- Pakaʻalana heiau
- Puʻukoholā Heiau

Maui

- Hale O Piʻilani Heiau
- Haleki'i-Pihana Heiau State Monument
- Loaloa Heiau

Molokai

- 'Ili'ili'ōpae Heiau

Oahu

- Hale O Papa [Mother Earth Heiau in Halawa]
- Hoʻolonopahu Heiau
- Kaneʻaki Heiau
- Pahua Heiau
- Pahukini Heiau
- Keaiwa Heiau
- Puʻu o Mahuka Heiau
- Ulupo Heiau

Kauai

- Wailua River State Park
- Kaulu Paoa Hula Heiau
- Kaulu-o-Laka Hula Heiau

Niihau

- Kaunupou Heiau
- Kaunuapua Heiau
- Kauwaha Heiau
- Pahau Heiau
- Pueo Heiau
- Puhi Ula Heiau

== See also ==
- Marae
- Dap-ay
