= Mauiloa =

- Aliʻi of Maui
- Consort: Kauhua
- Issue: Alau of Maui
- Father: Hanalaa
- Mother: Mahuia
- Religion: Hawaiian religion

Mauiloa was a High Chief (Aliʻi) of Maui. He is mentioned in legends and old chants and was likely a semi-historical person or character from myths.

He had control over portions of Western Maui and relied on the allegiance of many district chiefs.

Mauiloa was a contemporary of Laamaikahiki on Kauai. From the time of Mauiloa to the time of Kaulahea I, there must have been troubled times on the island of Maui.

Name of Mauiloa can be translated as "Great/Magnificent Maui".

The beginning of Mauiloa's rule was marked by countless battles to establish authority from many of the district chieftains of Maui.

Mauiloa was a son and successor of High Chief Hanalaʻa. His mother was Chiefess Mahuia. Mauiloa had married Kauhua and had a son Alau of Maui. He was a successor of his father. Kanemokuhealiʻi is the name of a grandson of Mauiloa.

== See also ==
- Alii nui of Maui
- Mythical chief and hero Māui
- Maui County, Hawaii

== Notes ==
Preceded by Hanalaʻa	Moʻi of Maui	Succeeded by Alau of Maui
