= Pili line =

Hawaiian dynasty

Pili line (House of Pili, Pili dynasty; Hawaiian language: Hale o Pili) was a royal house in ancient Hawaii that ruled over the island of Hawaiʻi with deep roots in the history of Samoa and possibly beyond further to the west, Ao-Po ("gathering of night"; metaphorically: "extreme west", "the land of the dead"), in Pulotu, the Samoan Underworld. It was founded on unknown date by King Pilikaʻaiea (Pili), who either was born in or came from either Upolu, Samoa or Uporu, Tahiti, but came to Hawaii and established his own dynasty of kings (Aliʻi). The overall arc of his career describes a brilliant young chief from foreign lands who was eager to share his abundant knowledge of advanced technology with distant frontier rustics. Some stories relate how his ambition got the better of him and damaged his relationships with his subjects. These stories cast him as a libidinous, restless and petty tyrant ever on the move searching for new conquests.

According to Samoan lore, Pili's parents were Muli-o-vai-lele and Tagaloa-a-lagi. Being something of a rascal, Pili had a falling out with his father Tagaloa of the Heavens and was cast out under threat of death. His mother encouraged him to travel to Manu'a and begin a new life on the frontier.

Once there he took to wife the daughter of Tuimanu'a and was for a time even granted the title of Tuimanu'a for educating the locals on taro cultivation and cooking, but he grew dissatisfied and relocated to Tutuila. Other Samoan accounts tell of how Pili dishonorably took liberties with the daughter of Tuimanu'a, a young maiden named Sina-sa'umani. This is the origin of the story of Hina and the Eel, and Sina and the Eel. In these versions it is Tuimanu'a's wrath over Sina's violated maidenhead that drives Pili to flee from Manu'a.

It was in Tutuila that he first took refuge, and where he acquired the Tuitele title, but again grew discontent with the chiefs there who appointed him and later mocked his lack of skill in fishing, so onward he traveled to Upolu. On Upolu he took as wife the daughter of Tui-a-Ana. Now, most Samoan lore agrees that Pili's sons were in order of birth Tua (founder of Atua), Ana (founder of Aana), Saga (founder of Tua-ma-Saga), and Tolufale (founder of Manono and Sapapalii). This suggests that Pili may have taken to wife his own granddaughter, not unlike the custom of Egyptian pharaohs.

Again, Pili grew dissatisfied with the Tui-a-ana's demands for fish instead of taro (likely a metaphor for conquest), and Pili commissioned a fleet of canoes that he uses to great effect, using a net to extract a mind-boggling haul to the amazement of Tui-a-ana and his chiefs. Samoan lore at this point recounts Pili's departure for Aopo where he established a vast plantation, became king, had many descendants, and later died. It is in this window of the narrative that he likely found sojourn in Hawai'i at the behest of po'o-kahuna Pa'ao and established the Pili line there. Legends tell of a pair of dragons in Wailuku river near Hilo, one named Pili-a-mo'o, the other Noho-a-mo'o, who were defeated in a contest of arms and magic by Hiiaka the sister of volcano goddess Pele. This may recount the end of Pili's tyrannical reign in Hawai'i Island . Each leg of the journey, Pili is credited with bringing some advancements as with agriculture and fishing.

According to Hawaiian lore, his parents were named Kukamolimaulialoha and Laʻau. According to the myth, he was a descendant of the god of sky, Wākea.

Pilikaʻaiea married his sister, Hina-au-kekele and was succeeded by his descendant Kukohou.

== Rulers ==
Map of Hawaii; rulers of Pili line ruled over Hawaiʻi.

- Pilikaʻaiea
- Kukohou
- Kanipahu
- Kalapana of Hawaiʻi
- Kahaimoelea
- Kalaunuiohua
- Kuaiwa
- Kahoukapu
- Kauholanuimahu
- Kihanuilulumoku
- Līloa
- Hākau
- Umi-a-Liloa
- Kealiiokaloa
- Keawenuiaumi
- Kaikilani
- Keākealani Kāne
- Keakamahana
- Keakealaniwahine
