= Pilikaʻaiea =

Chief of Hawaiʻi

- Spouse: Hina-au-kekele (sister)
- Children: Koa (Ko) ♂ Hinaʻauamai ♀

Pilikaʻaiea (or Pili-auau; the short form: Pili) was Aliʻi Nui of Hawaiʻi. He was a sovereign chief, who deposed the indigenous chief, Kapawā.

== Name ==
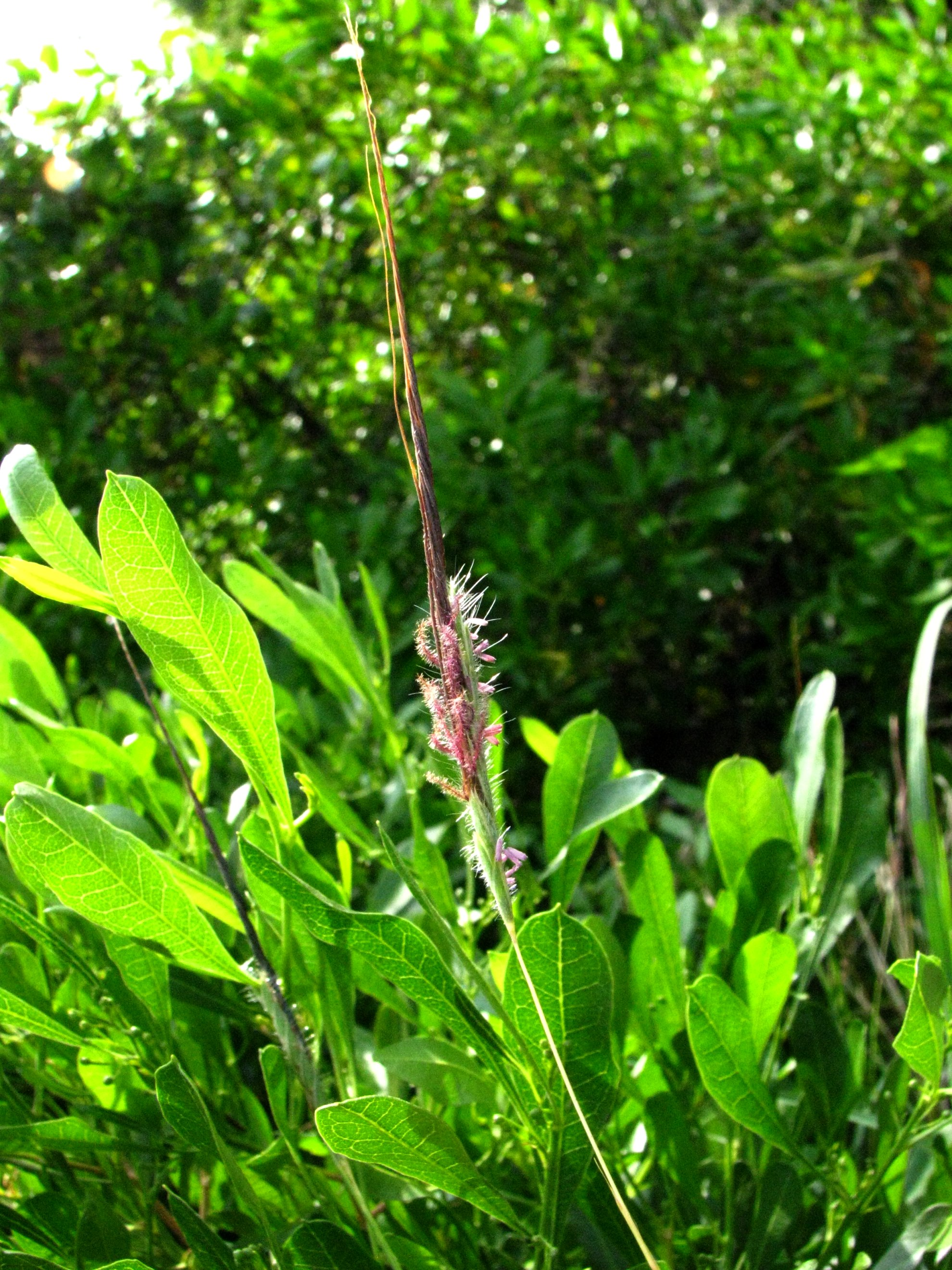
Pili — Heteropogon contortus

The Hawaiian word pili is the native Hawaiian name of Heteropogon contortus.

== Biography ==
According to some legends, Pilikaʻaiea was a grandchild of Lanakawai of the Ulu line, but other sources claim he was born and brought up in "Kahiki" (Tahiti) or Wawau (Borabora) or 'Upolu (Samoa). The parents of Pilikaʻaiea were Laʻau and Kukamolimaulialoha, whilst the wife of Pilikaʻaiea was his sister, Hina-au-kekele.

Because the chiefs of the island of Hawaiʻi had carelessly intermarried with junior chiefly lines and low ranking women, kahuna Paʻao went to Kahiki to find a relative of pure blood who could compete in rank with the chiefly lines of the other islands. He recites a chant to invite Lonokaeho to return with him. Lonokaeho declines the invitation, but sends Pilikaʻaiea in his place. Pilikaʻaiea becomes high chief and wins the support of the people and he becomes the ancestor of the chiefs of Hawaiʻi on the Ulu line down to the late 19th century.

His successor was his descendant, Chief Kukohou.

Preceded by Kapawā	Aliʻi of Hawaiʻi; 1110–1130	Succeeded by Kukohou

== See also ==
- Pili line
