= Hawaiʻi (island) =

Largest island in Hawaii

Nickname: The Big Island, Moku o Keawe, The Orchid Isle
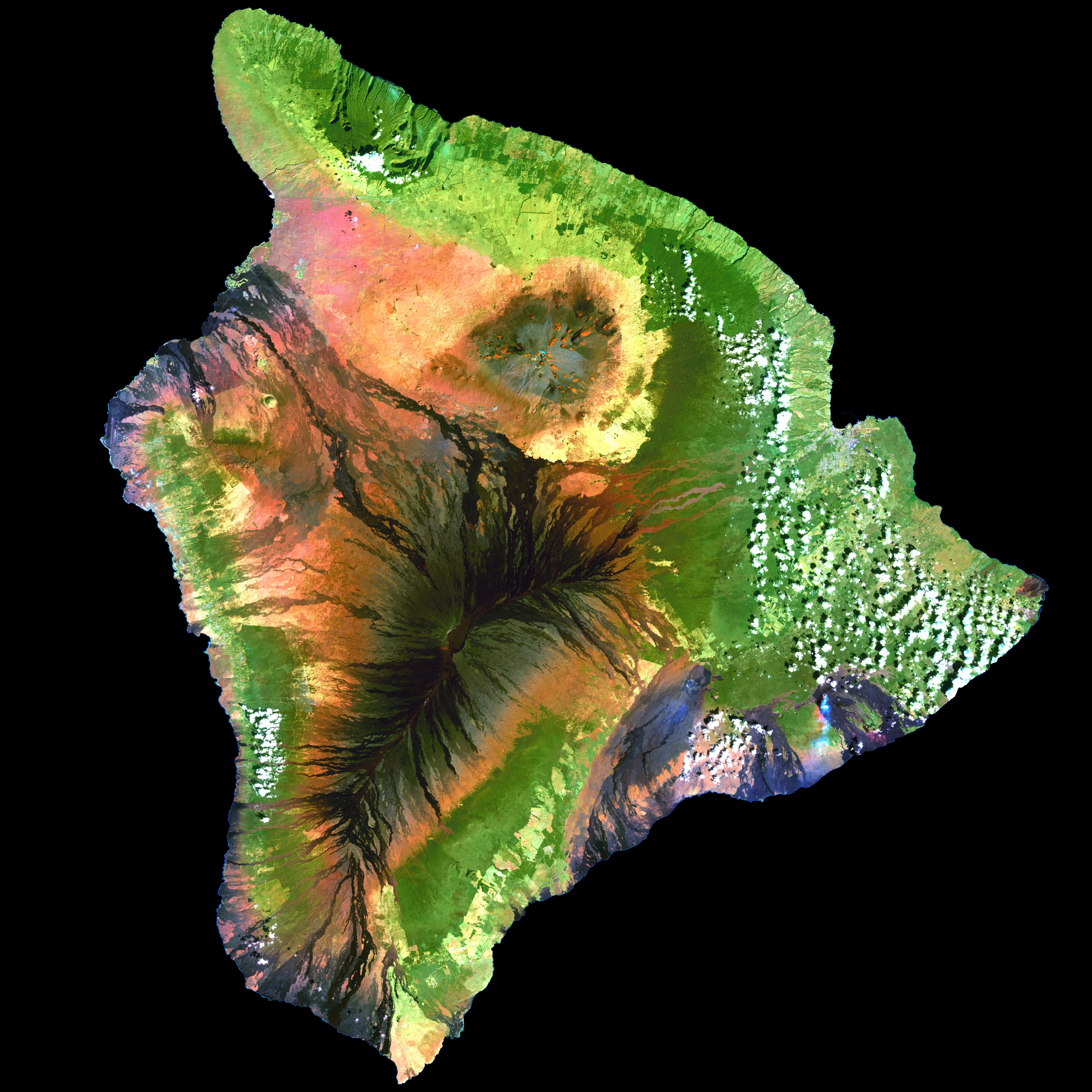
- Landsat mosaic, 1999–2001

- Location in the State of Hawaii

Geography
- Location: North Pacific Ocean
- Coordinates: 19.6°N 155.5°W
- Area: 4,028 sq mi (10,430 km^{2})
- Area rank: Largest Hawaiian Island
- Highest elevation: 13,803 ft (4207.2 m)
- Highest point: Mauna Kea

Administration
- United States
- State: Hawaii
- County: Hawaiʻi
- Symbols
- Flower: Red Pua Lehua (ʻOhiʻa blossom)
- Color: ʻUlaʻula (red)
- Largest settlement: Hilo

Demographics
- Population: 200,629 (2020)
- Pop. density: 49.8/sq mi (19.23/km^{2})

Additional information
- Time zone: Hawaii–Aleutian

Hawaiʻi, (Note: English: /həˈwaɪ.i/ hə-WY-ee, Hawaiian: [həˈvɐjʔi, həˈwɐjʔi].) sometimes written Hawaii, is the largest island in the United States, located in the State of Hawaii. It is the southeasternmost of the Hawaiian Islands, a chain of volcanic islands in the North Pacific Ocean. With an area of 4,028 square miles (10,430 km^{2}), it has 63% of the Hawaiian archipelago's combined landmass. However, it has only 13% of the archipelago's population. The island of Hawaiʻi is the third largest island in Polynesia, behind the North and South Islands of New Zealand.

The official name of the island is Island of Hawaiʻi (often shortened to Hawaiʻi Island) to distinguish it from the state. It is also referred to as the Big Island, due to its size relative to the other Hawaiian Islands. In Hawaiian, the island is sometimes called Moku o Keawe. The word keawe has several meanings. One definition, "southern cross", is said to be the name of an ancient chief. Another definition is "the bearer".

Hawaiʻi County is the local administrative unit. As of the 2020 census, the population was 200,629. The county seat and largest community is Hilo. Hawaiʻi County has no incorporated cities.

== History ==
Hawaiʻi is allegedly named after Hawaiʻiloa, a legendary Polynesian navigator who is said to have discovered the island. Other accounts attribute the name to the legendary realm of Hawaiki, a place from which some Polynesians are said to have originated, the place where they transition to in the afterlife, or the realm of the gods and goddesses. The indigenous Hawaiian name of the island was originally rendered and published as "Owyhee" or "Owhyhee".

It is uncertain when Hawaiʻi was first discovered by humans. Early archaeological studies suggested that Polynesian explorers from the Marquesas Islands or Society Islands may have arrived in the Hawaiian islands as early as the 3rd century AD, possibly with a second wave arriving from Tahiti around 1100. However, more recent analyses suggest that the first settlers arrived around 900–1200 AD.

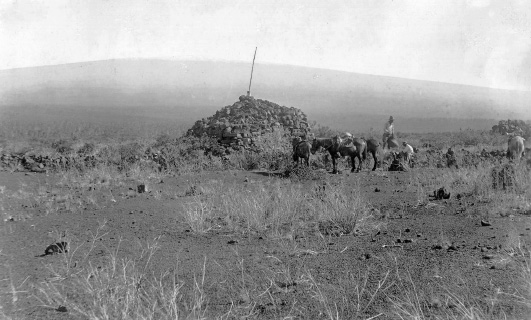
The Ahu-a-ʻUmi Heiau, built for ʻUmi-a-Līloa in the Kona District

Oral tradition holds one of the most famous aliʻinui of Hawaiʻi to be ʻUmi-a-Līloa, who united the island by force. He was the illegitimate son of Līloa, aliʻinui of Hawaiʻi who ruled from Waipiʻo Valley in the Hāmākua district. When Līloa died, the island passed to ʻUmi's half-brother Hakau. However, ʻUmi attacked and killed Hakau along with the aliʻi (nobles) who served him, winning control of Hāmākua. He then proceeded to conquer the rebelling districts of Hilo, Puna, Kaʻū, and Kona. He placed the seat of his new government in Kailua in the Kona district.

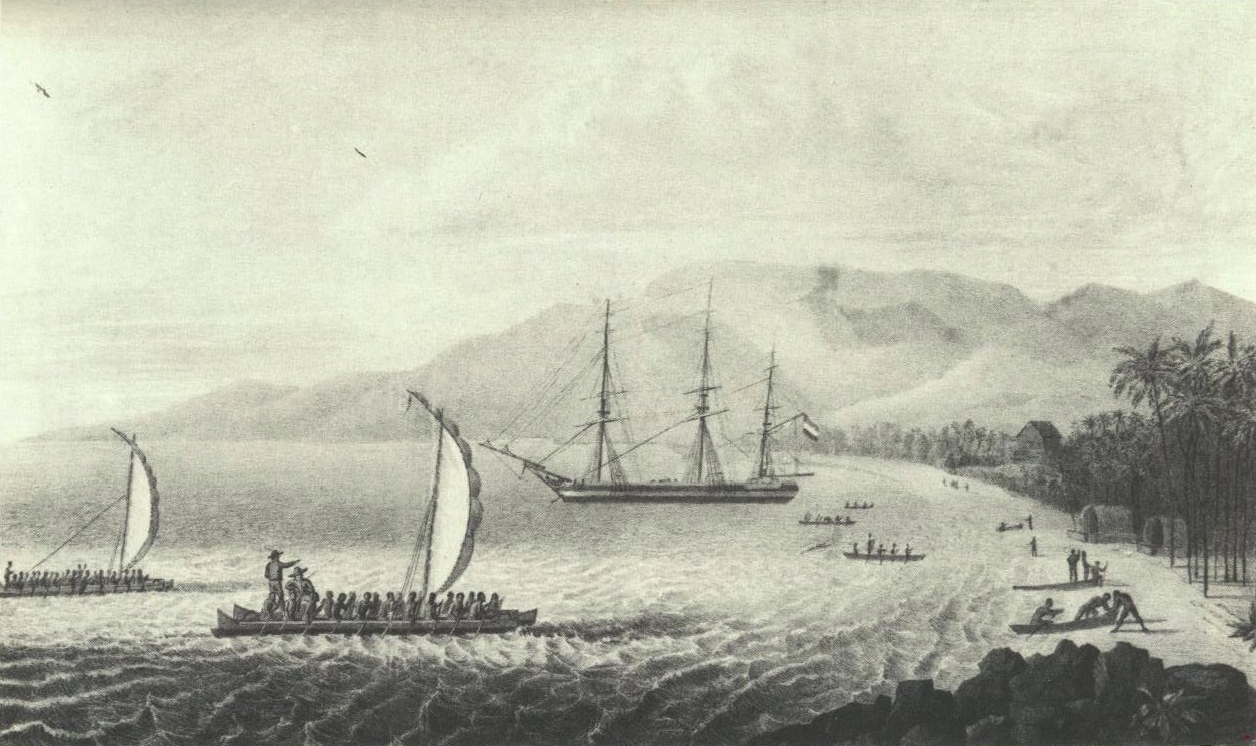
Hawaiian and European ships in Kealakekua Bay in 1829

In 1779, Captain James Cook made his second voyage to the Hawaiian islands, anchoring in Kealakekua Bay on the island of Hawaiʻi. He spent several weeks there, meeting and trading with locals and readying his ships for a planned trip to the Arctic. The Hawaiians received him hospitably, considering him to be an incarnation of the god Lono. Early in 1780, Cook departed. However, his ships were damaged in a storm immediately after setting sail, and he was forced to return to Kealakekua after only a week at sea. During this second anchoring, an altercation between the Europeans and the Hawaiians turned violent, resulting in the death of multiple people on both sides, including Cook himself. Peaceful relations were eventually restored with the crew of his ships, who departed for good later that month.

In 1780, the island of Hawaiʻi was controlled by the aliʻinui Kalaniʻōpuʻu, a descendant of ʻUmi-a-Līloa. On his death in 1782, he designated his son Kīwalaʻō as his heir. However, a feud between Kīwalaʻō and Kalaniʻōpuʻu's nephew Paiʻea Kamehameha soon escalated into a civil war. Kīwalaʻō was killed in the Battle of Mokuʻōhai later that same year, leaving control of the island divided between Kamehameha in the west, Kīwalaʻō's uncle and advisor Keawemaʻuhili in the northeast, and Kīwalaʻō's half-brother Keōua Kūʻahuʻula in the south. The three chiefs, aided by Western ships and weapons, fought to a standstill for eight years until 1790, when Keōua defeated and killed Keawemaʻuhili. In 1791 Kamehameha's men killed Keōua at a diplomatic meeting, leaving control of Hawaiʻi to Kamehameha.

Kamehameha went on to conquer the rest of the Hawaiian islands, consolidating his control in 1810 with the peaceful surrender of Kaumualiʻi, king of Kauai. He gave his new kingdom, and by extension the island chain itself, the name of his native island – the Kingdom of Hawaiʻi.

In 1822, missionary William Ellis arrived and was one of a party that completed a tour of the island, descriptions of which were later published in his journal.

In July, 1898, Hawaiʻi and all the Hawaiian islands were annexed by the United States, becoming the Territory of Hawaii. In 1905, the passage of the County Act established the County of Hawaiʻi, providing the island with local government for the first time since 1810.

== Geology and geography ==
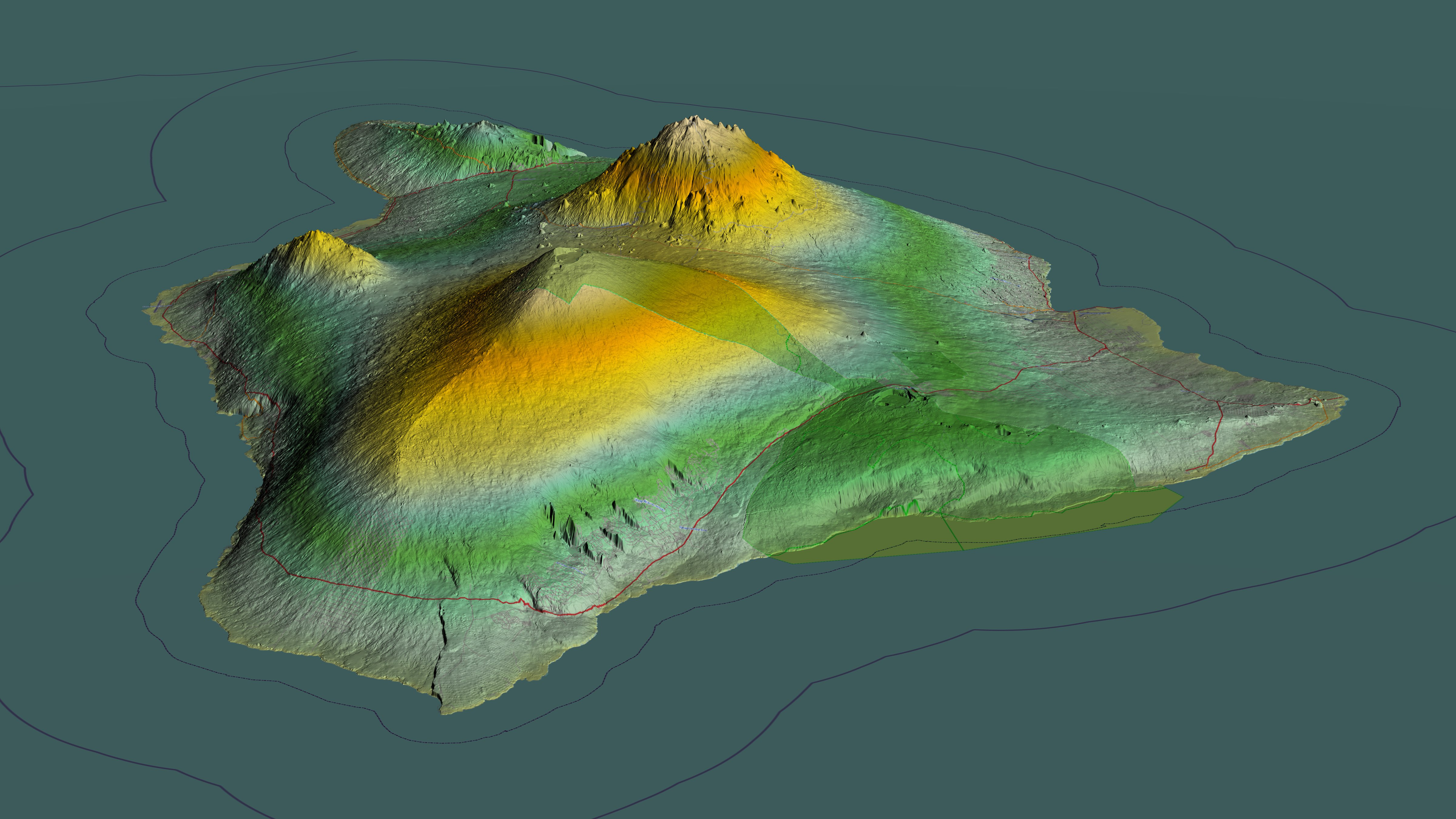
Aerial view, 3D computer-generated image

According to the U.S. Census Bureau, the county has a total area of 5,086 square miles (13,170 km^{2}), of which 4,028 sq mi (10,430 km^{2}) is land and 1,058 sq mi (2,740 km^{2}) (20.8%) is water. The county's land area comprises 62.7 percent of the state's land area. It is the highest percentage by any county in the United States. Delaware's Sussex County comes in second at 48.0 percent, while Rhode Island's Providence County is third at 39.6 percent.

At its greatest dimension, the island is 93 miles (150 km) across. Measured from its sea floor base to its highest peak, Mauna Kea at 10,000 metres (33,000 ft) is the world's tallest mountain, taller than even Mount Everest, since the base of Mount Everest is above sea level.

The most southern point of Hawaiʻi, Ka Lae, is the southernmost point of the United States. The nearest landfall to the south is the Line Islands. To the northwest of the island of Hawaiʻi is the island of Maui, whose Haleakalā volcano is visible from Hawaiʻi Island across the ʻAlenuihāhā Channel.

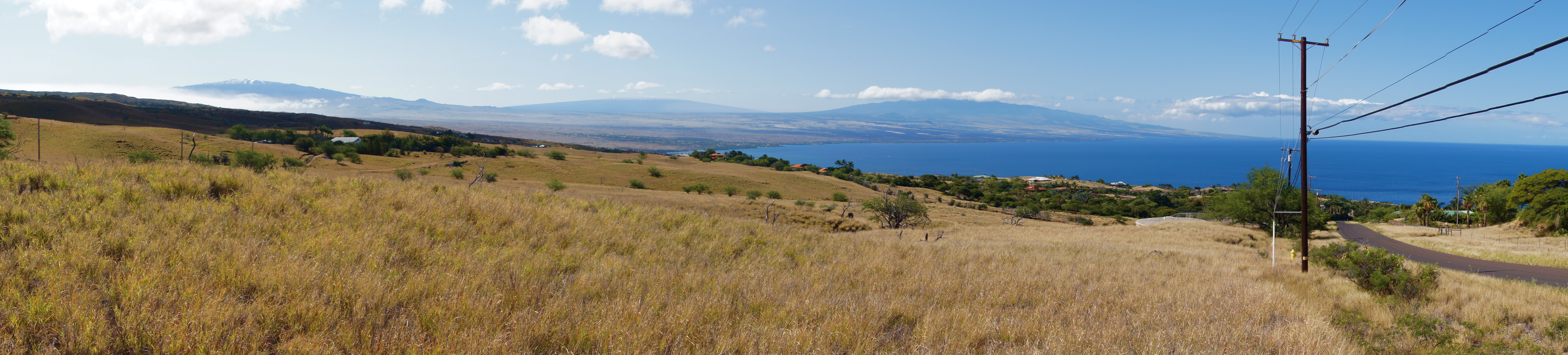
A view of the Kohala Coast and adjacent volcanoes, taken from the slopes of Kohala, about 6 miles (10 km) northwest of Kawaihae. From left to right: Mauna Kea, Mauna Loa, and Hualālai.

=== Volcanism ===
The five shield volcanoes

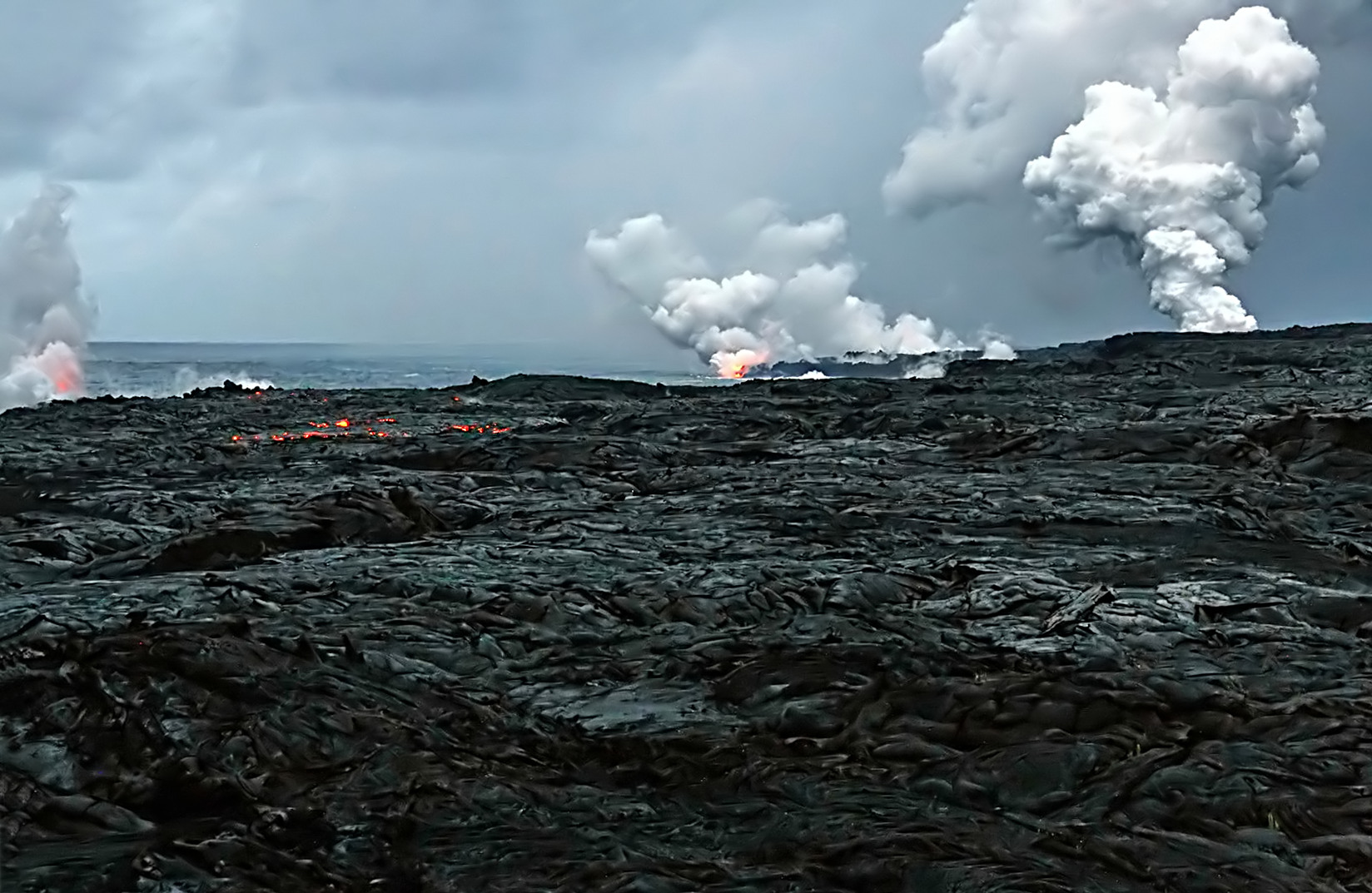
Steam plume as Kīlauea's red lava enters the ocean. Three Waikupanaha and one Ki lava ocean entries.

The island of Hawaiʻi is built from five separate shield volcanoes that erupted somewhat sequentially, one overlapping the other. These are (from oldest to youngest):

- Kohala – extinct
- Mauna Kea – dormant
- Hualālai – active
- Mauna Loa – active, partly within Hawaiʻi Volcanoes National Park
- Kīlauea – active, part of Hawaiʻi Volcanoes National Park

Geological evidence from exposures of old surfaces on the south and west flanks of Mauna Loa led to the proposal that two ancient volcanic shields (named Nīnole and Kulani) were all but buried by the younger Mauna Loa. Geologists now consider these "outcrops" to be part of Mauna Loa.

Based on geochemical (including trace elements) and isotope differences in their eruptive products, Hawaiian volcanoes fall into two families. The differences are believed due to their separate magma systems. Hualālai and Mauna Loa are members of one family, while Kohala, Mauna Kea, and Kilauea are members of the other.

Because Mauna Loa and Kīlauea are active volcanoes, the island is growing. Between January 1983 and September 2002, lava flows added 543 acres (220 ha) to the island. Lava flowing from Kīlauea destroyed several towns, including Kapoho in 1960 and again in 2018, and Kalapana and Kaimū in 1990. In 1987 lava filled in "Queen's Bath", a large, L-shaped, freshwater pool in the Kalapana area. Another 875 acres were added between May and July 2018 by the 2018 lower Puna eruption, with "Fissure 8" located within Leilani Estates subdivision being a primary source of the lava. Green Lake, the largest freshwater lake on the island, was covered by lava in that eruption as well as Ahalanui Beach Park and part of Isaac Hale Beach Park, the latter of which was inundated with black sand, rendering its boatramp unusable. Mauna Loa erupted briefly in 2022, 38 years after the prior activity.

Some geologists also count two undersea volcanoes in the base of the island. Māhukona off the northwest corner of the island has eroded below the ocean surface. Kamaʻehuakanaloa (formerly Lōʻihi) is under water 22 miles (35 km) southeast of Hawaiʻi. It is an erupting seamount that has grown to reach 3,200 feet (980 m) below the ocean surface, and it is forecast to break the surface in 10,000 to 100,000 years.

The volcano Kilauea, has had its 38th eruption on December 8, 2025. It began Saturday morning and sent lava shooting at least 1,000 feet into the air, according to the USGS. At one point, a "rare" triple fountain occurred: three lava fountains spewed from vents in the north and south cones. During these events, the USGS put a code orange in place, which indicates that an eruption is either likely or occurring, but with no, or minor, ash. There was also a warning of tephra, or hot glassy volcanic fragments, as well as pumice, scoria and reticulite, which can fall on the ground within one to three miles of the eruptive vents.

=== Great Crack ===
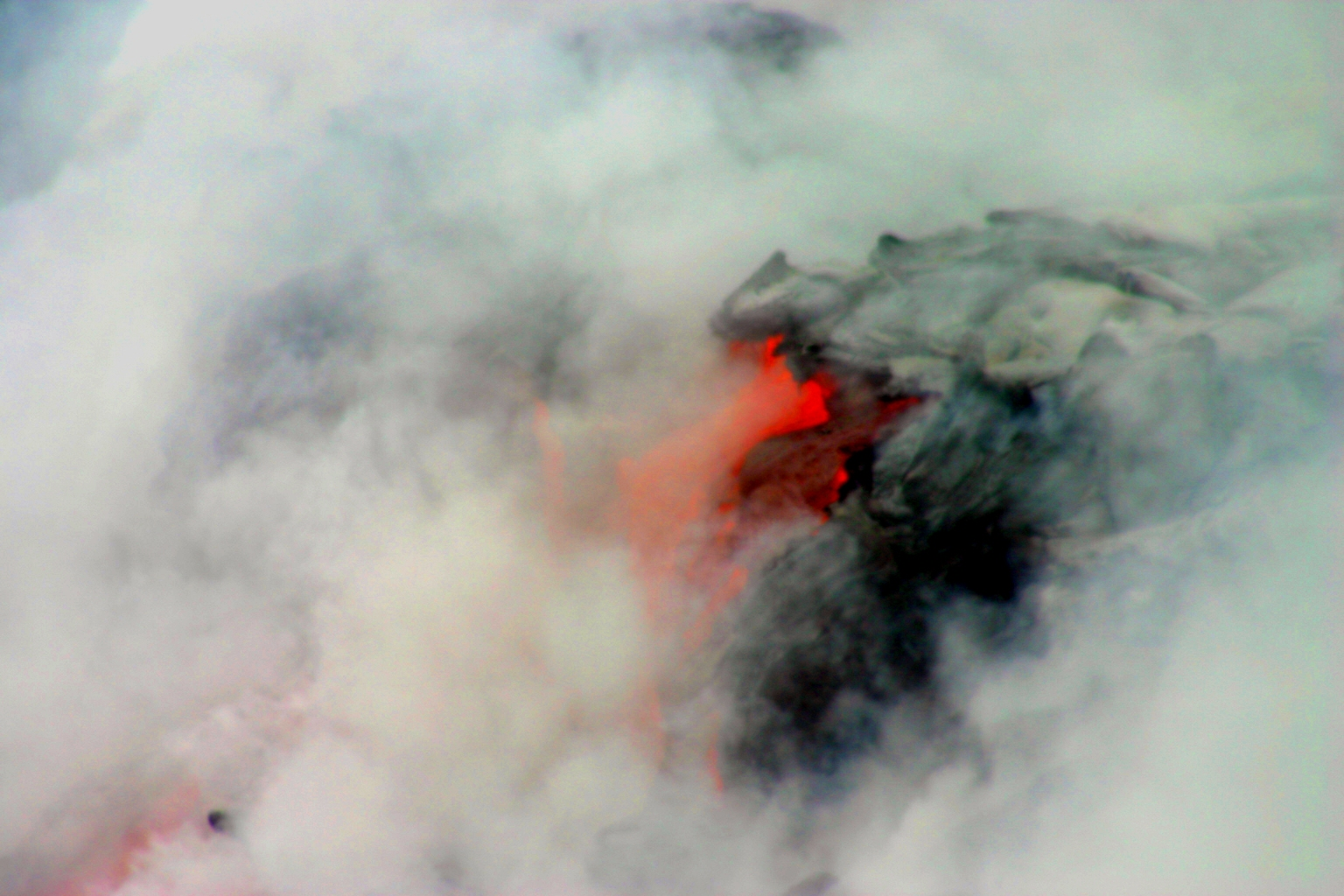
Lava entering the Pacific Ocean at Hawaiʻi Volcanoes National Park in April 2005, ever increasing the size of the island

The Great Crack is an eight-mile-long (13,000 m), 60-foot-wide (18 m) and 60-foot-deep (18 m) fissure in the island, in the district of Kaʻū. According to the United States Geological Survey (USGS), the Great Crack is the result of crustal dilation from magmatic intrusions into the southwest rift zone of Kīlauea. While neither the earthquake of 1868 nor that of 1975 caused a measurable change in the Great Crack, lava welled out of its lower 6 miles (10 km) in 1823.

Trails, rock walls, and archaeological sites from as old as the 12th century exist near the Great Crack. In August 2018, the National Park Service purchased nearly 2,000 acres (810 ha) of private land adjacent to Hawaiʻi Volcanoes National Park due to the geological features to be studied and preserved.

=== Hilina Slump ===
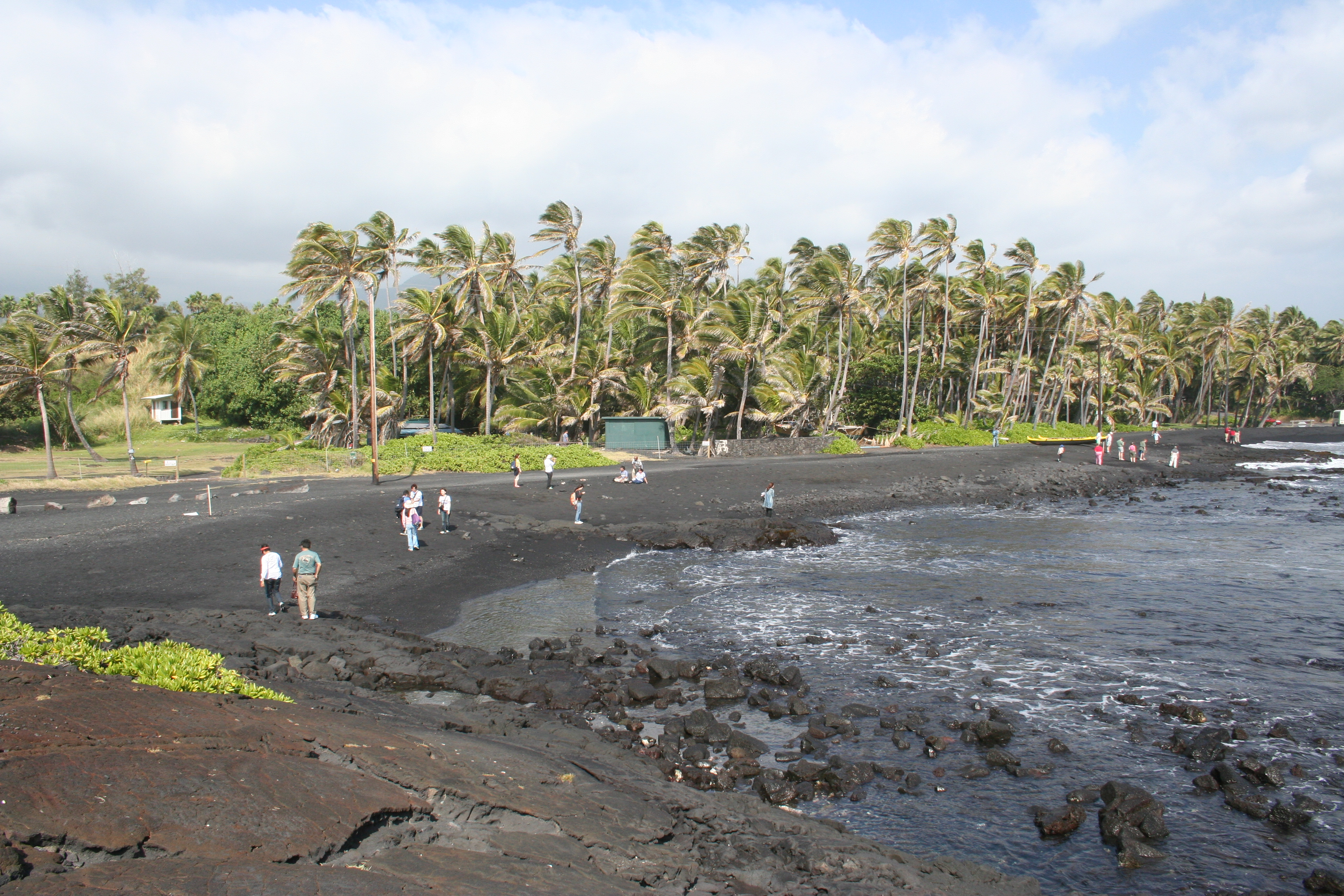
Punaluʻu Beach Park, one of the most famous black sanded beaches

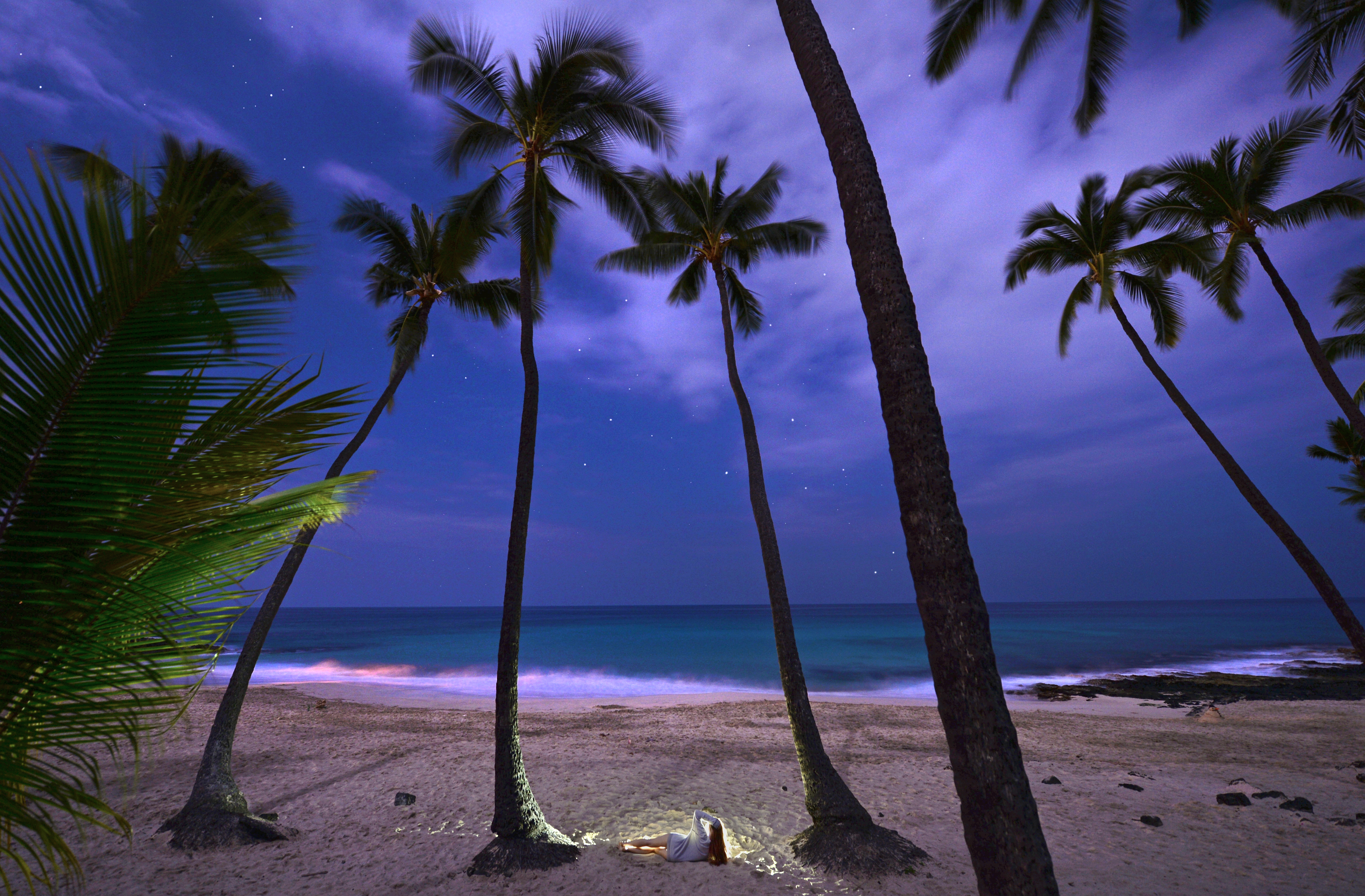
Laʻaloa Bay, also known as "Magic Sands", located in Kailua-Kona

The Hilina Slump is a 4,760-cubic-mile (19,800 km^{3}) section of the south slope of Kīlauea that is moving away from the island. Between 1990 and 1993, Global Positioning System (GPS) measurements showed a southward displacement of about 4 inches (10 cm) per year. Undersea measurements show a "bench" that has formed a buttress and that this buttress may tend to reduce the likelihood of catastrophic detachment.

=== Earthquakes and tsunamis ===
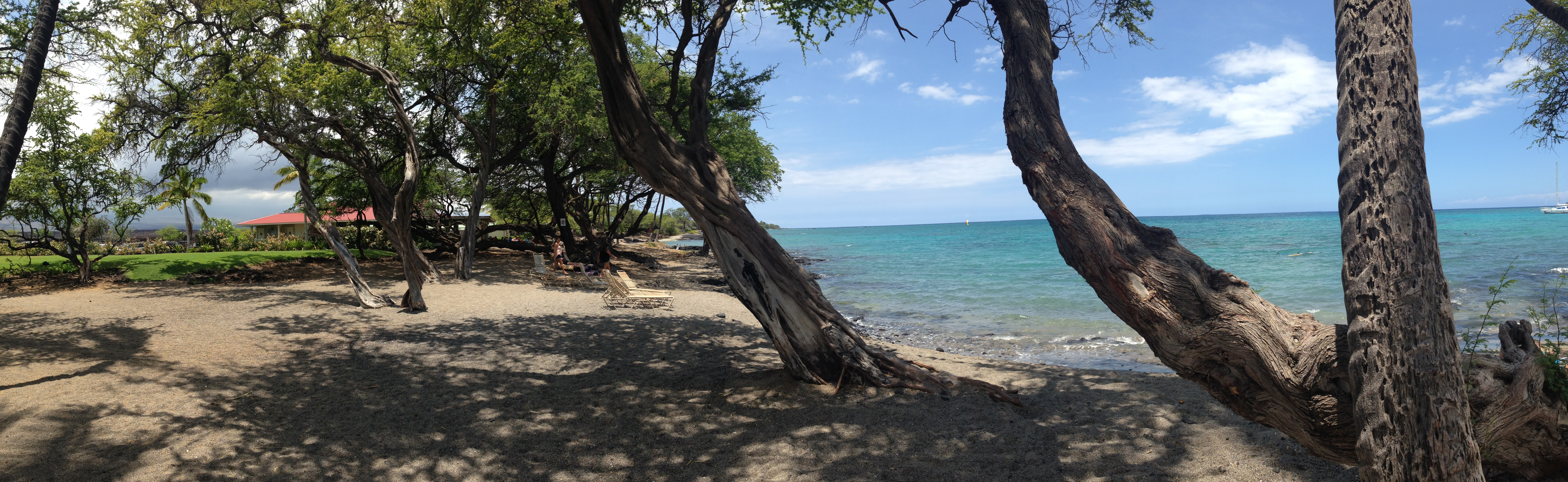
Anaehoʻomalu Beach panorama

On 2 April 1868, an earthquake with a magnitude estimated between 7.25 and 7.9 rocked the southeast coast of Hawaiʻi. This was the most destructive earthquake in the Hawaiʻi's recorded history. It triggered a landslide on Mauna Loa, 5 miles (8 km) north of Pāhala, killing 31 people. A tsunami claimed 46 more lives. The villages of Punaluʻu, Nīnole, Kāwāʻa, Honuʻapo, and Keauhou were severely damaged. The tsunami reportedly rolled over the tops of the coconut trees up to 60 feet (18 m) high, and it reached inland a distance of a quarter of a mile (400 meters) in some places.

On 29 November 1975, a 37-mile-wide (60 km) section of the Hilina Slump dropped 11.5 feet (3.5 m) and slid 26 feet (7.9 m) toward the ocean. This movement caused a 7.2 magnitude earthquake and a 48-foot-high (15 m) tsunami. Oceanfront property was washed off its foundations in Punaluʻu. Two deaths were reported at Halape, and 19 other people were injured.

The island suffered damage from a tsunami caused by earthquakes in Alaska on 1 April 1946, and in Chile on 23 May 1960. Downtown Hilo was damaged by both tsunamis, with many lives lost. Just north of Hilo, Laupāhoehoe lost 16 schoolchildren and five teachers in the tsunami of 1946.

In March 2011, a 9.0 magnitude earthquake off the east coast of Japan again created a tsunami that caused minor damage in Hawaiʻi. The estimated damage to public buildings was about US$3 million. In the Kona area this tsunami washed a house into Kealakekua Bay, destroyed a yacht club and tour boat offices in Keauhou Bay, caused extensive damage in Kailua-Kona, flooded the ground floor of the King Kamehameha Hotel, and temporarily closed the Kona Village Resort.

In early May 2018, hundreds of small earthquakes were detected on Kīlauea's East Rift Zone, leading officials to issue evacuation warnings. On 3 May 2018, the volcano erupted in Puna after a 5.0 earthquake earlier in the day, causing evacuations of Leilani Estates and Lanipuna Gardens subdivisions. A seemingly related 5.3 magnitude quake and a subsequent 6.9 magnitude earthquake occurred on 4 May.

=== Volcanic fog ===
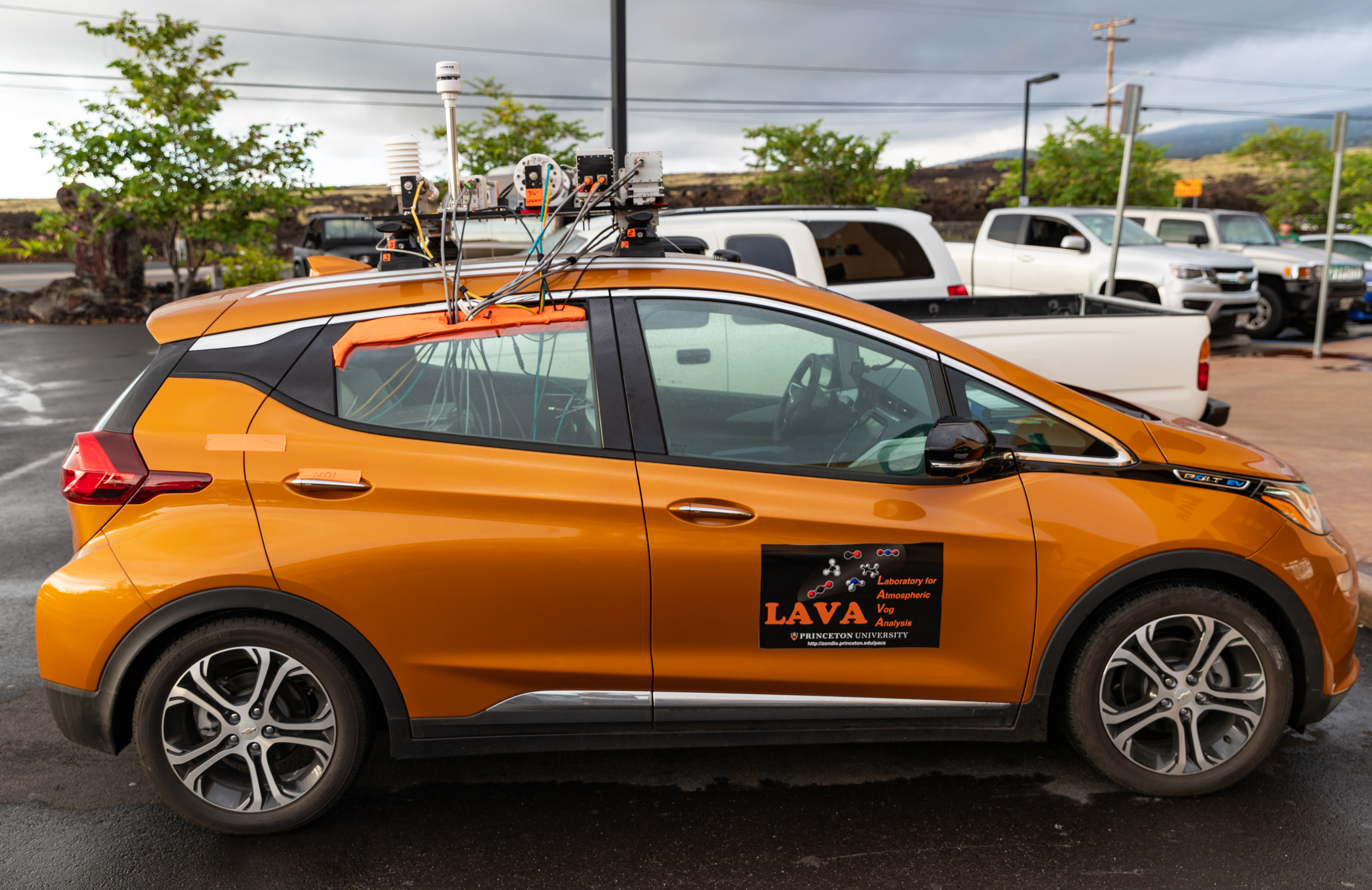
Mobile atmospheric volcanic fog (vog) measuring station in Hawaiʻi

Vog (volcanic fog) can envelop the island of Hawaiʻi when Kīlauea is active. The gas plumes created a blanket of vog that the trade winds mostly deflect toward the Kona coast. Vog can damage the health of plants, humans, and other animals. Most of the aerosols are acidic and of a size where they can remain in the lungs to damage them. Flu-like symptoms and general lethargy are reported, and are especially pronounced in people with respiratory conditions.

=== National protected areas ===
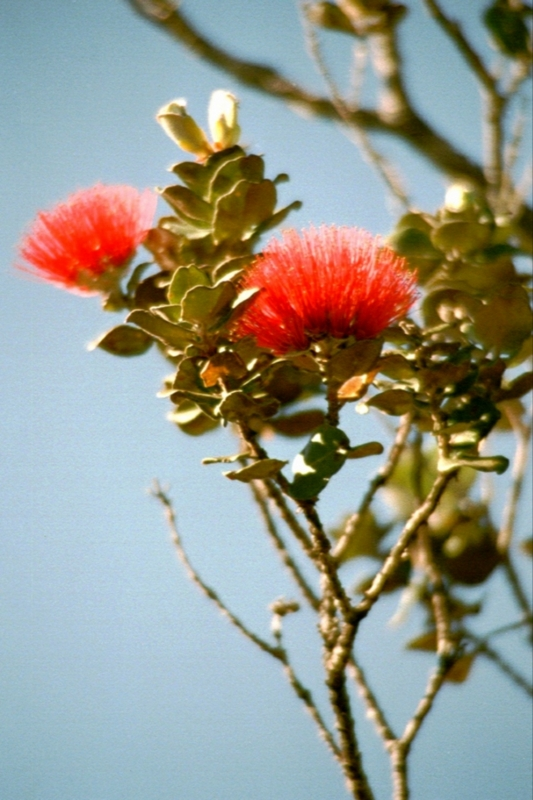
ʻŌhiʻa Lehua blossoms, Hawaiʻi

The island hosts many specialized ecosystems/microclimates, including many protected by federal designation:

- Ala Kahakai National Historic Trail
- Hakalau Forest National Wildlife Refuge
- Hawaiʻi Volcanoes National Park
- Kaloko-Honokōhau National Historical Park
- Kohala Historical Sites State Monument (Mookini Heiau)
- Kona Forest National Wildlife Refuge
- Puʻuhonua o Hōnaunau National Historical Park
- Puʻukoholā Heiau National Historic Site

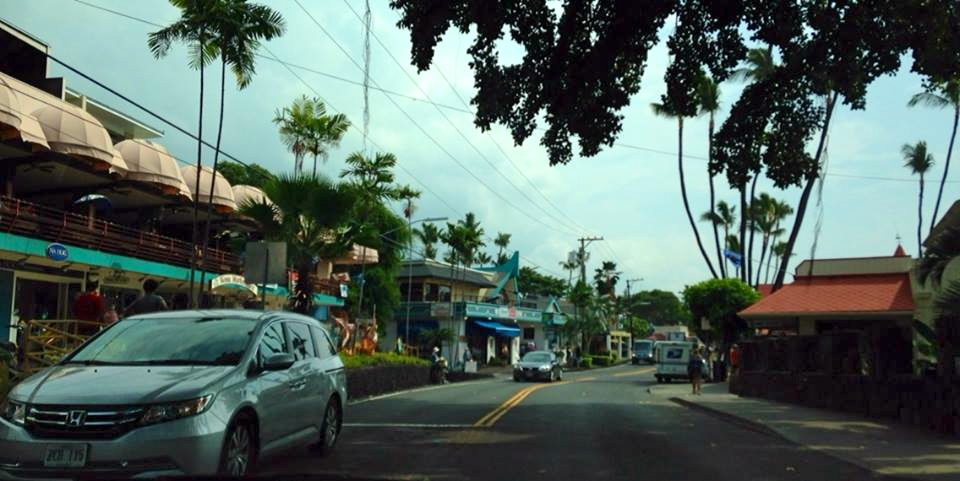
Downtown Kailua-Kona

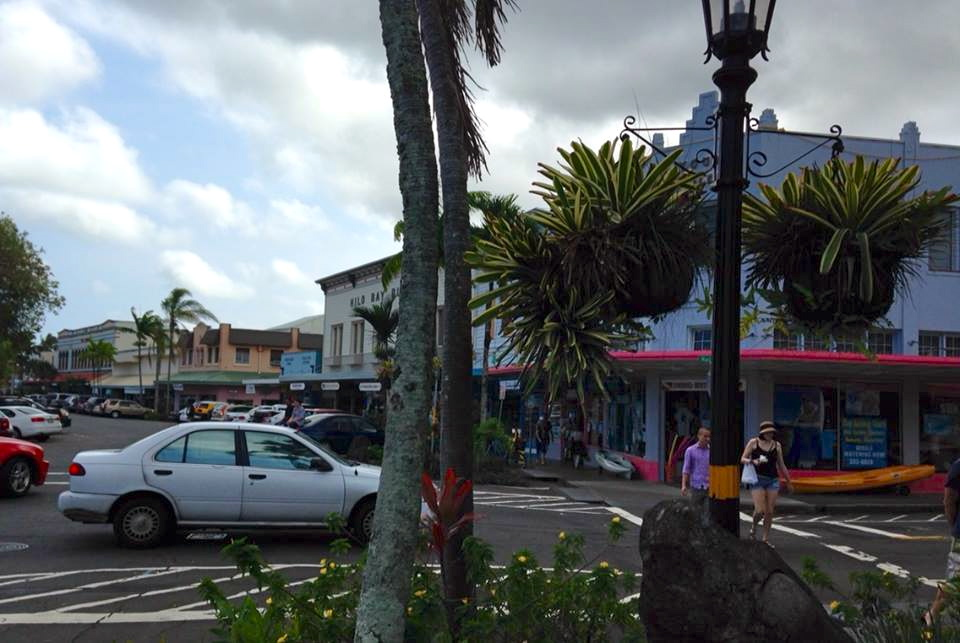
Downtown Hilo

== Economy ==
Sugarcane was the backbone of the island economy for more than a century. In the mid-20th century, sugarcane plantations began to downsize, and in 1995 the island's last plantation closed.

Most of the island's economy depends on tourism, centered primarily in resort areas on the western coast of the island in the North Kona and South Kohala districts. Sustainable tourism is increasing.

Diversified agriculture is a growth sector. Major crops include macadamia nuts, papaya, flowers, tropical and temperate vegetables, aquaculture, and coffee beans. The island's orchid production is the state's largest. The island is home to one of the United States' largest cattle ranches: Parker Ranch, on 175,000 acres (708 km^{2}) in Waimea.

The island is known for astronomy, with numerous telescopes positioned on the summit of Mauna Kea at the Maunakea Observatories, where atmospheric clarity is excellent and little light pollution intrudes. Astronomy has become somewhat controversial, given accusations of mismanagement by the observatory manager, the University of Hawaiʻi. The proposed addition of the Thirty Meter Telescope (TMT) generated protests that stalled the project and led to the transfer of management responsibility to a Governor-appointed body.

NELHA (Natural Energy Laboratory of Hawaii Authority), a 675-acre (273 ha) state developed site, is a green economic development ocean science and technology park on the west side of the island. It provides resources and facilities for energy and ocean-related research, education, and commercial activities in an environmentally sound and culturally sensitive manner. Business tenants on this coastal site include microalgae farms, aquaculture, solar technology and marine biotech. Tenants have access to three sets of pipelines delivering deep-sea water from a depth of up to 3,000 feet (910 m), as well as pristine sea surface water and almost constant sunshine. A 2012 study by the University of Hawaiʻi Economic Research Organization reported that the total economic impact of activities at NELHA was $87.7 million and created 583 jobs.

In 2019, Hawaii started showing declining in economic wealth when COVID-19 began. This is also where most people started to leave the Islands. With no tourists and the increasing of rent, people were leaving the Islands more. Hawaii's RBP is 8.6 percent more than the U.S., causing Hawaii to be one of the most expensive living conditions to be in.

=== Top employers ===
According to the county's 2021 Annual Comprehensive Financial Report, the top employers in the county are the following:

#	Employer	# of Employees
1	State of Hawaii	16,700
2	Kamehameha Schools, Hawaiʻi Island	3,380
3	Hawaiʻi County	2,800
4	United States Government	1,300
5	Mauna Kea Beach Hotel	1,100
6	Four Seasons Resort Hualalai	1,003
7	KTA Super Stores	900
8	Hilton Waikoloa Village	850
9	The Fairmont Orchid	560
10	Waikoloa Beach Marriott Resort	259

== Transportation ==
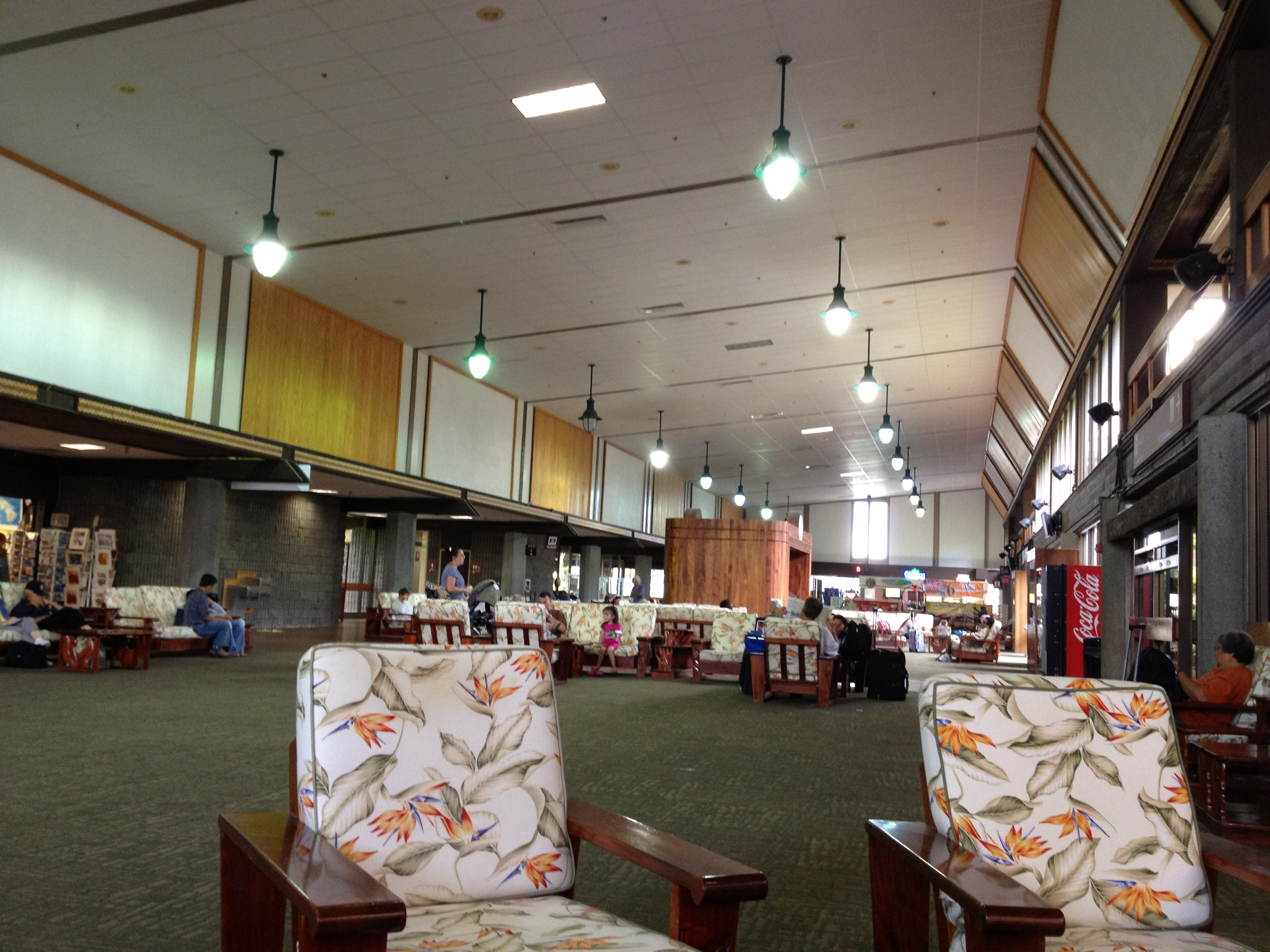
Interior lobby of Hilo International Airport

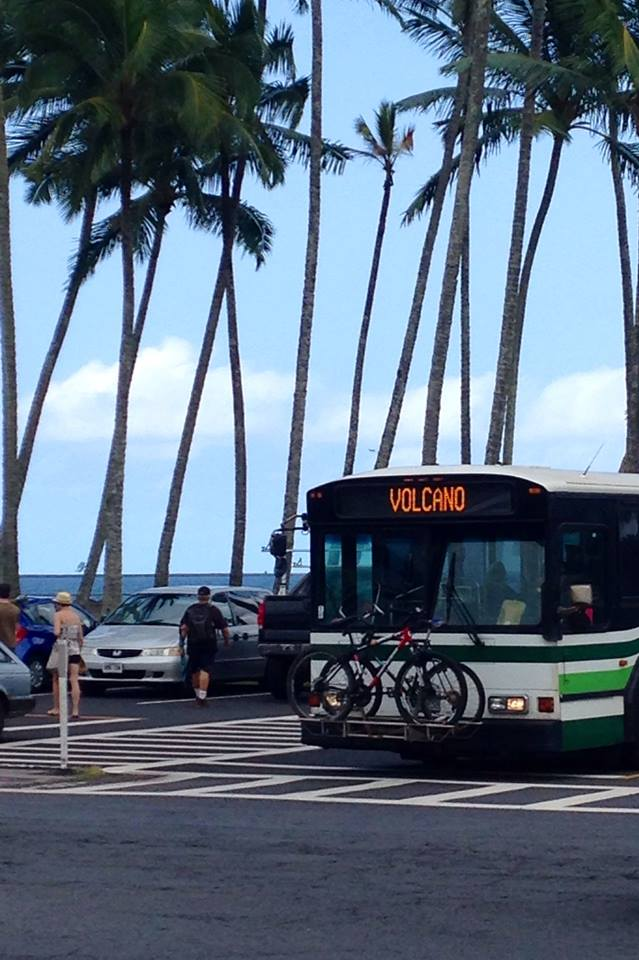
Hele-On bus in Hilo

=== Air ===
Two commercial airports serve Hawaiʻi Island:

- Hilo International Airport (ITO)
- Kona International Airport (KOA)

The 2 private airports are:

- Waimea-Kohala Airport (MUE)
- ʻUpolu Airport (UPP)

=== Rail ===
No railroad or tram service exists today on Hawaiʻi Island.

The Hawaiʻi Consolidated Railway (originally the Hilo Railroad) operated in varying magnitudes from 1899 until 1947. The railway ran out of Hilo, northbound to Paʻauilo and southbound to Pāhoa, Glenwood (near Volcano), and Kamaili.

Other smaller freight only railroads also operated on the island, primarily for the transport of sugarcane and other crops. Some of these include Waiākea Plantation Railroad (in Hilo), Honokaʻa Plantation Railroad, Hawaii Railway (on the north shore), Hawaiian Agricultural Company Railroad (in Pāhala) and West Hawaii Railway (between Kailua-Kona and Captain Cook).

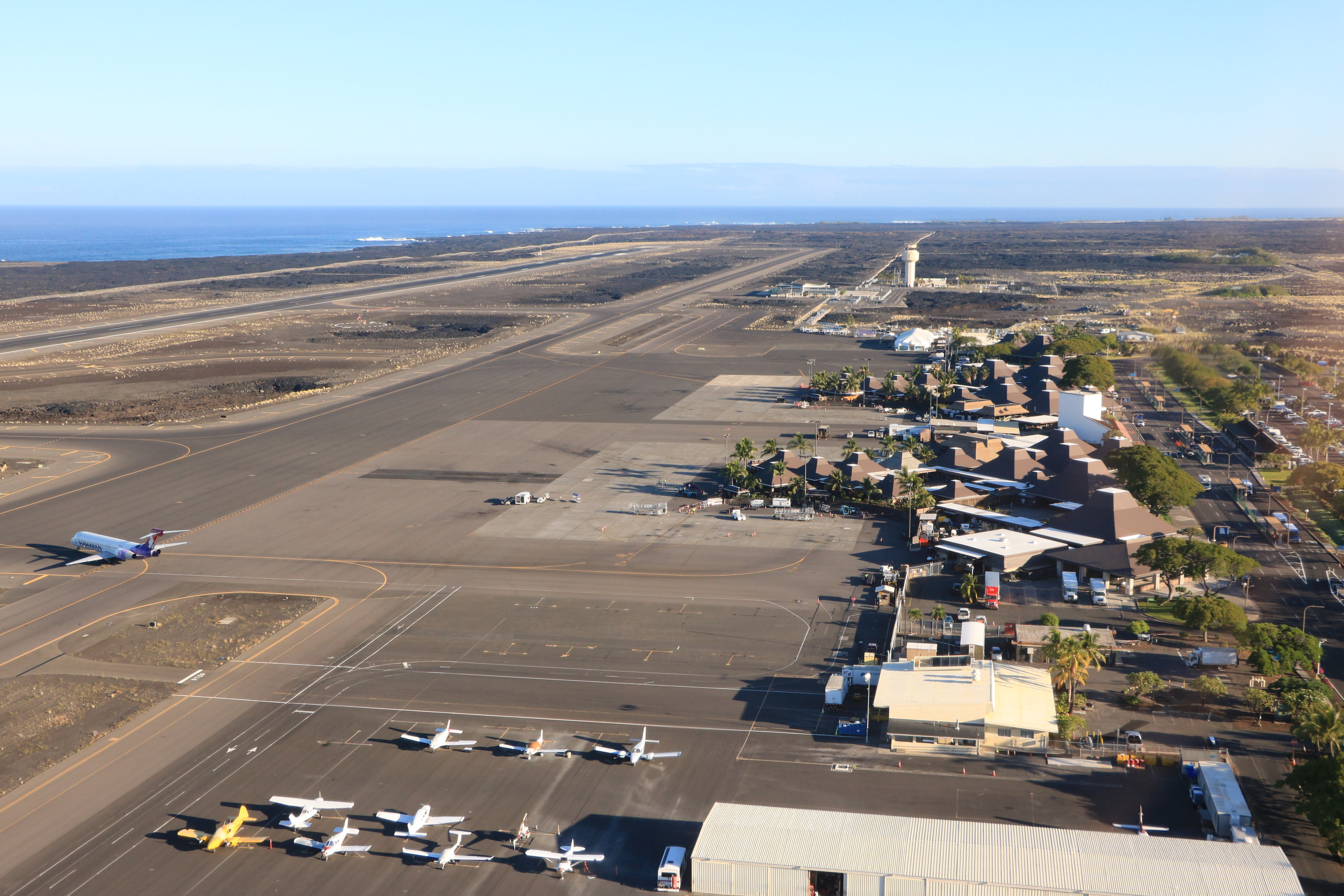
Aerial view of Kona International Airport

=== Bus ===
Island-wide bus service is provided by Hele-On Bus.

=== Major highways ===
- Route 11 (part of Hawaiʻi Belt Road)
- Route 19 (part of Hawaiʻi Belt Road)
- Route 130 (from Keaʻau to Kalapana)
- Route 132 (from Pāhoa to Kapoho)
- Route 137 (from Kalapana to Kapoho; also known as "Red Road")
- Route 190 (part of Hawaiʻi Belt Road)
- Route 200 (also known as "Saddle Road", a cross island route from Hilo to Route 190)
- Route 240 (from Honokaʻa to Waipiʻo Valley)
- Route 250 (Kohala Mountain Road, from Waimea to Hāwī)
- Route 270 (ʻAkoni Pule Highway, from Kawaihae to Pololū Valley)
- Route 2000 (a modernized portion of "Saddle Road" extending 6.2 miles west from Hilo)

The 3 Hawaiʻi Scenic Byways are:

- Māmalahoa Kona Heritage Center
- Royal Footsteps Along the Kona Coast
- Kaʻū Scenic Byway – The Slopes of Mauna Loa

=== Maritime ===
The major ports are Hilo Harbor on the east side and Kawaihae Harbor and Kailua Pier on the west side.

Cruise ships often stop at Kailua-Kona (90 times in 2017) and Hilo (108 times in 2017).

There are several small boatramps throughout the island for public and private use.

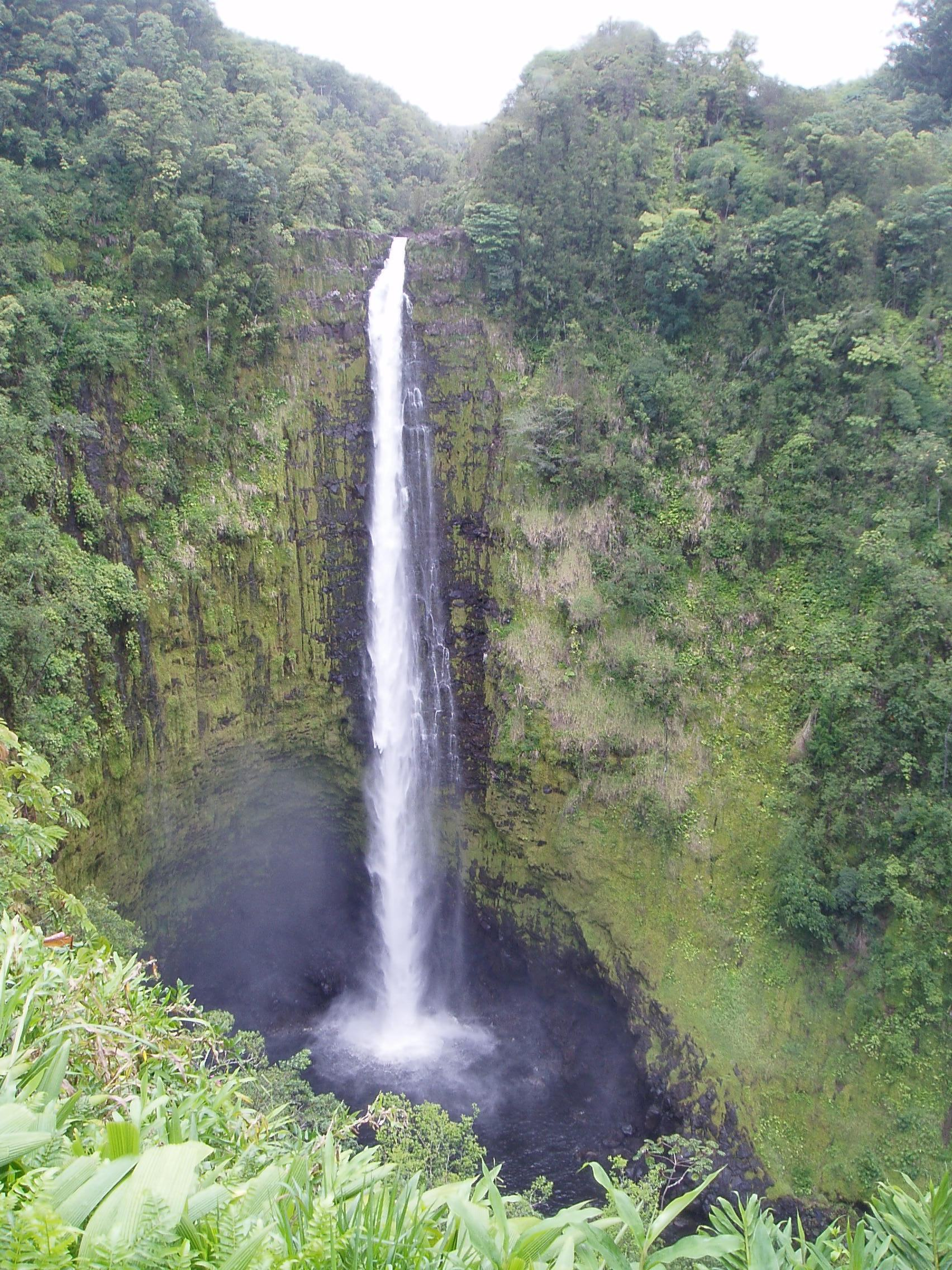
ʻAkaka Falls on Kolekole Stream

== Tourism ==
=== Places of interest ===
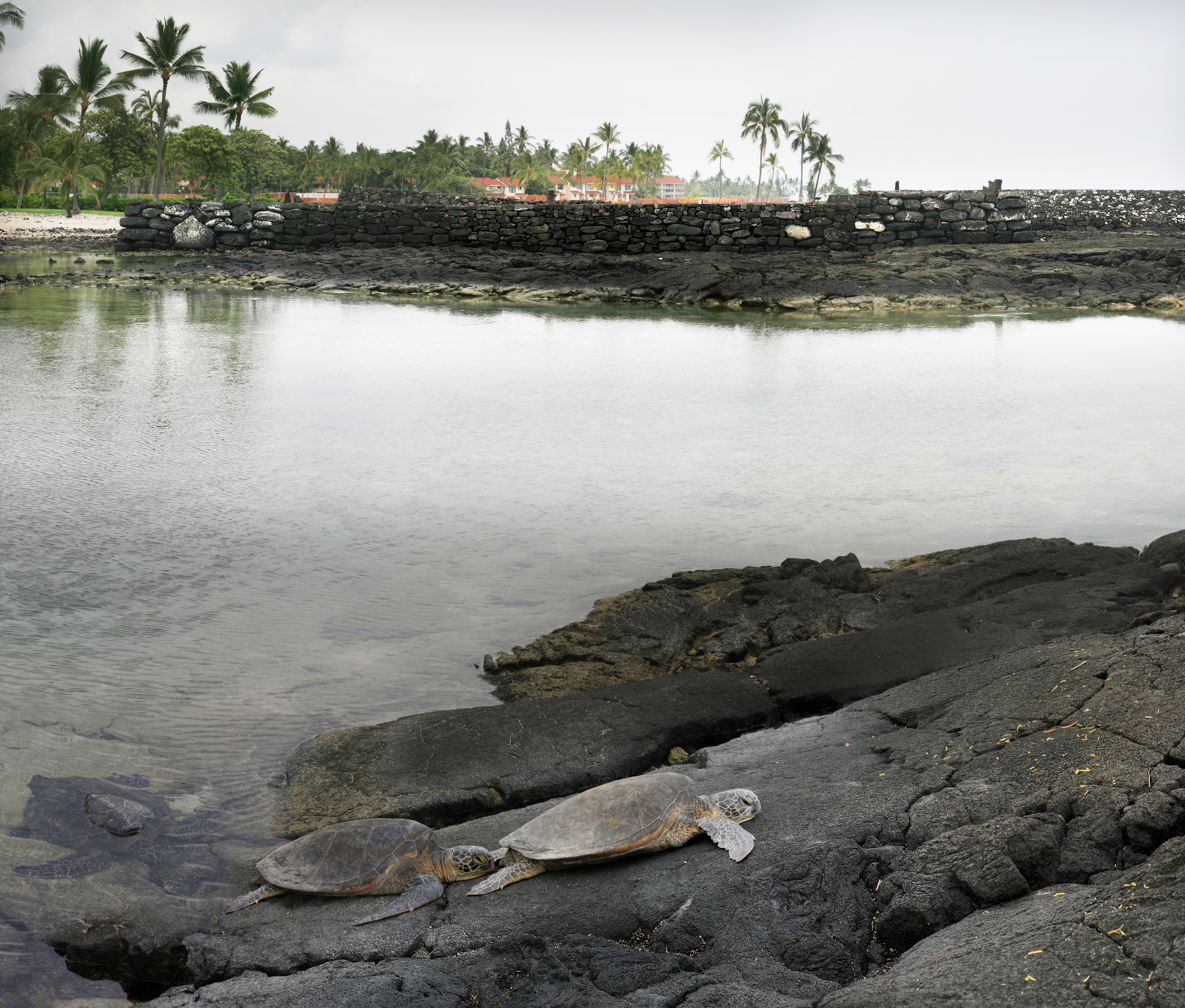
Green sea turtle lying on an old lava flow; the background shows a Hawaiian temple, known as a "heiau" in the Hawaiian language.

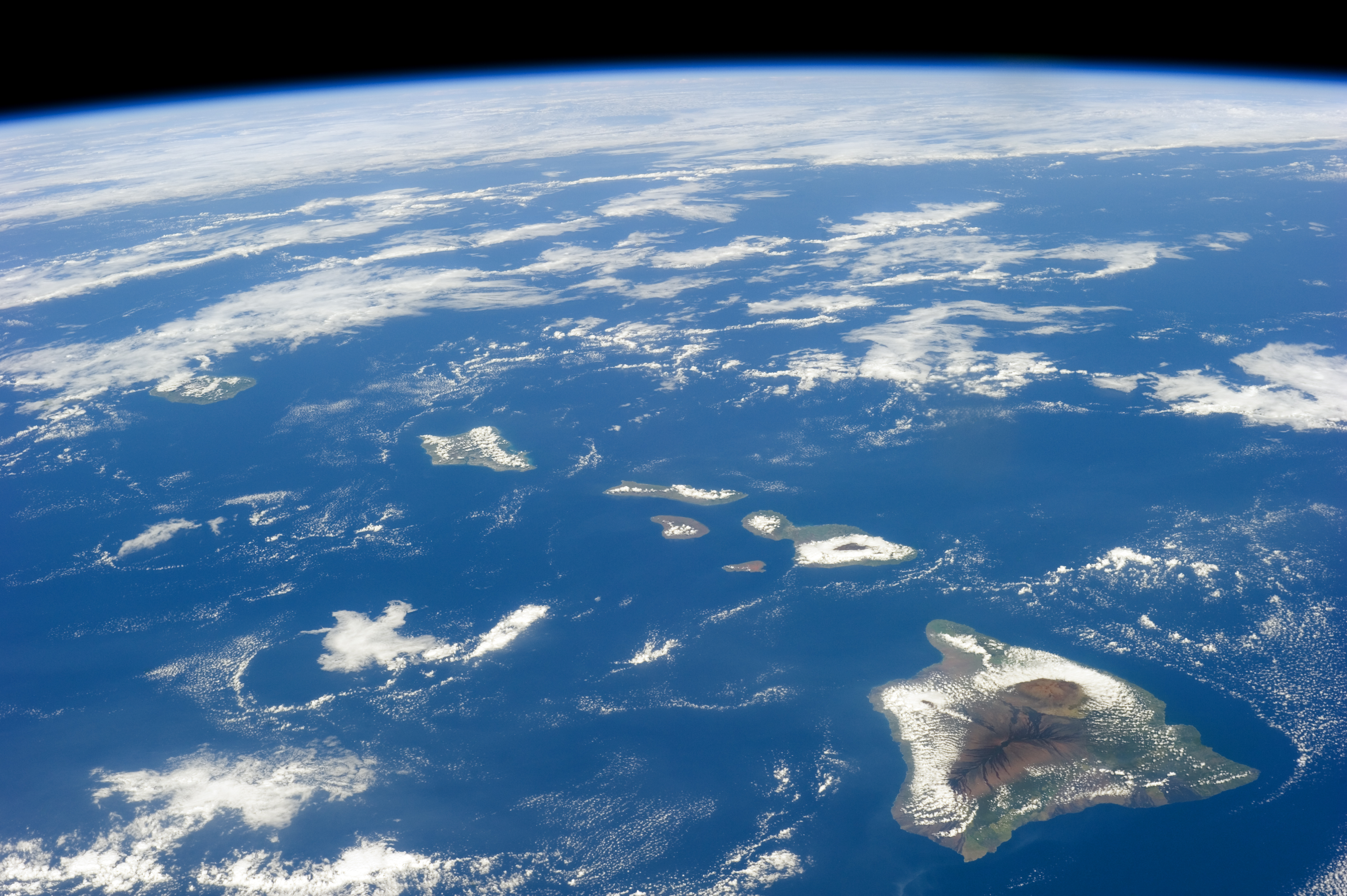
Hawaiʻi from space, 26 January 2014

- ʻAkaka Falls, one of the tallest waterfalls on the island.
- Amy B. H. Greenwell Ethnobotanical Garden houses many endangered endemic plants.
- East Hawaii Cultural Center
- Hawaii Tropical Botanical Garden
- Hawaiʻi Volcanoes National Park, comprising the active volcanoes Kīlauea and Mauna Loa
- Huliheʻe Palace, a royal palace in Kailua-Kona
- ʻImiloa Astronomy Center in Hilo
- Ka Lae, the southernmost point in the United States
- Laupāhoehoe Train Museum
- Lyman House Memorial Museum in Hilo
- Manuka State Wayside Park
- Mauna Kea Observatories
- Nani Mau Gardens
- Onizuka Center for International Astronomy
- Pacific Tsunami Museum overlooking Hilo Bay
- Panaʻewa Rainforest Zoo in Hilo
- Pua Mau Place Arboretum and Botanical Garden (closed)
- Puʻuhonua o Hōnaunau National Historical Park
- Puʻukoholā Heiau National Historic Site, the site of one of the most significant heiau in Hawaiʻi
- Rainbow Falls State Park
- Sadie Seymour Botanical Gardens
- Umauma Falls
- University of Hawaiʻi at Hilo Botanical Gardens
- Waipiʻo Valley
- Wao Kele o Puna
- World Botanical Gardens

=== Hotels on the east coast ===
The larger hotels on the east coast are:

- Grand Naniloa Hotel, Hilo
- Hilo Hawaiian Hotel
- Volcano House, Kīlauea

=== Hotels on the west coast ===
The larger hotels on the west coast, from north (Puakō) to south (Captain Cook):

- Mauna Kea Beach Hotel
- The Fairmont Orchid
- Hilton Waikoloa Village
- Waikoloa Beach Marriott
- King Kamehameha Hotel
- Four Seasons Resort Hualalai
- Sheraton Kona Resort & Spa at Keauhou Bay
- Manago Hotel

== Maps ==
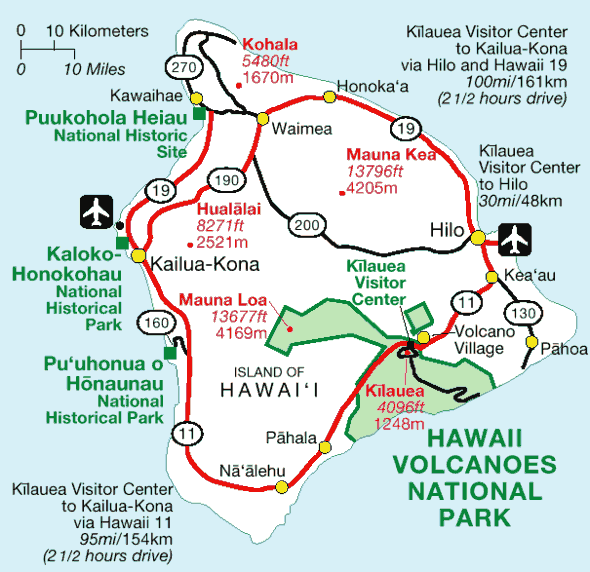
National parks, mountains and cities on the island

Topographic map of the island of Hawaiʻi

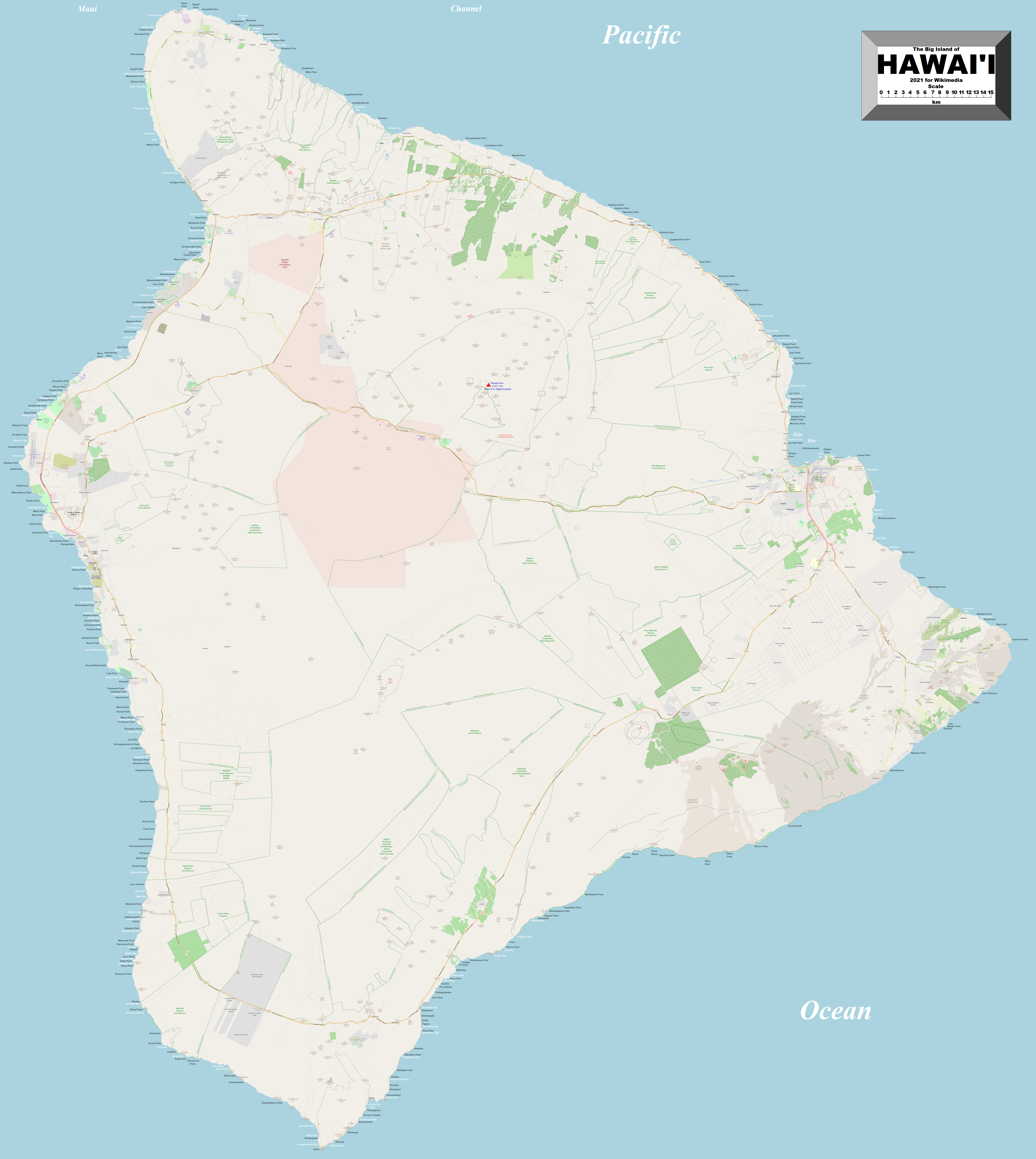
Detailed map of the island of Hawaiʻi
- Interactive 3D model for Chrome or Firefox

== See also ==
- National Register of Historic Places listings on the island of Hawaii
