= KTA =

KTA may refer to:

- Kansas Turnpike, US
  - Kansas Turnpike Authority
- Karratha Airport, Western Australia
- Kokoda Track Authority, managers of the WWII Kokoda Track in PNG
- Korea Taekwondo Association
- KTA Super Stores, Hawaii
- Kerntechnische Ausschuss, Germany
