= Hawaii Tropical Botanical Garden =

Botanical garden and nature preserve in Hawaii

Coordinates: 19°48′38″N 155°5′45″W

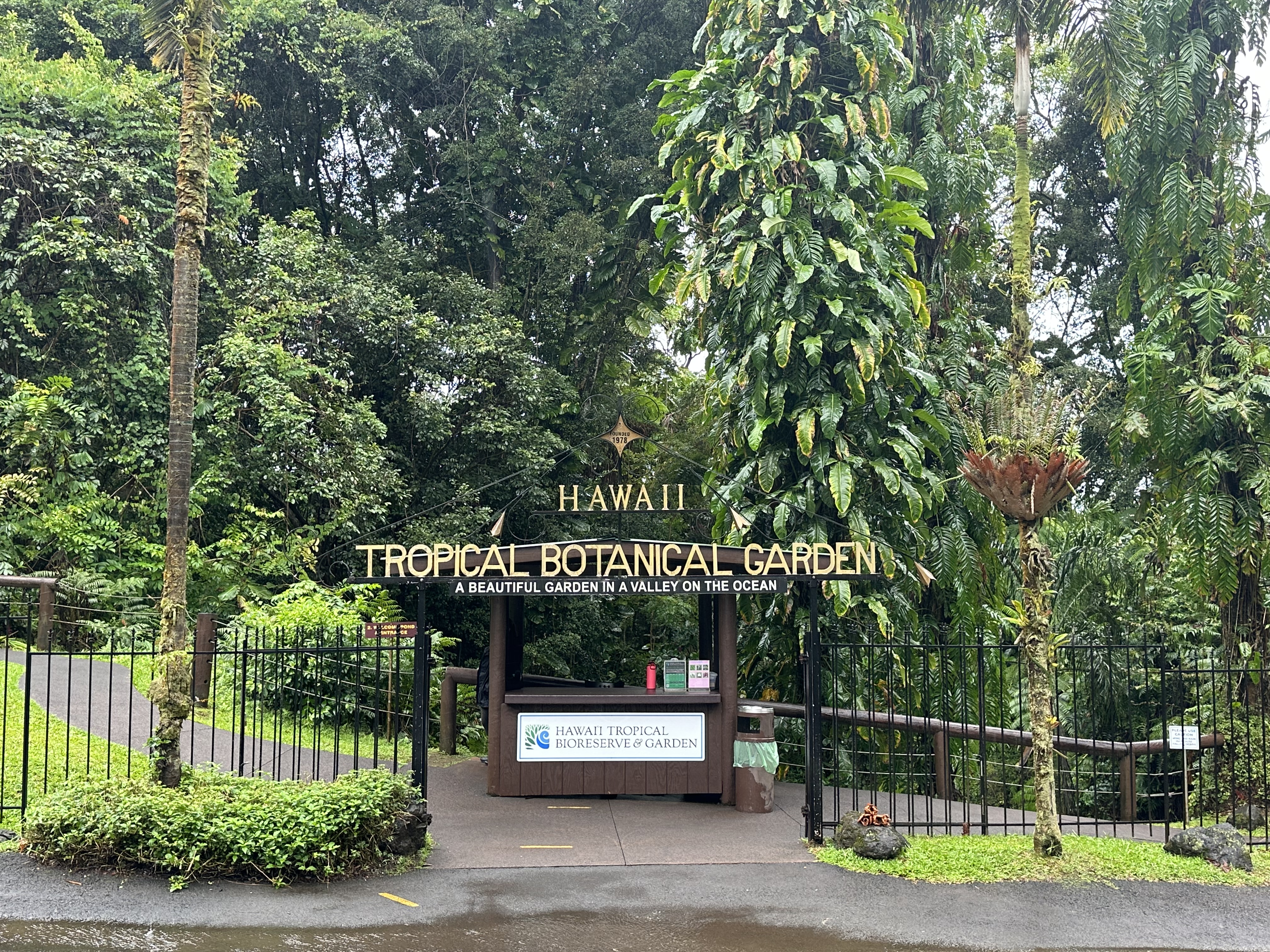
- Entrance
- Interactive map of Hawaii Tropical Botanical Garden
- Location: Hāmākua, Hawaii Island, Hawaii, United States
- Area: 17 acres (6.9 ha)
- Website: HTBG.com

The Hawaii Tropical Botanical Garden covers 17 acres (6.9 ha) at the entrance of the Onomea Valley on the coast in Hāmākua on Hawaii Island of Hawaii.

The boardwalk descends into a rainforest canopy of palms and tree ferns, opening to winding paved paths lined with over 2500 species of tropical plants, including anthuriums, gingers, bromeliads, heliconias, and over 270 species of orchids.

Dan J. Lutkenhouse purchased the property in 1977, and opened it to the public in 1984. Today, the garden is a nonprofit organization that continues to promote education, protect native and endemic plants, and foster tourism.

== Gallery ==
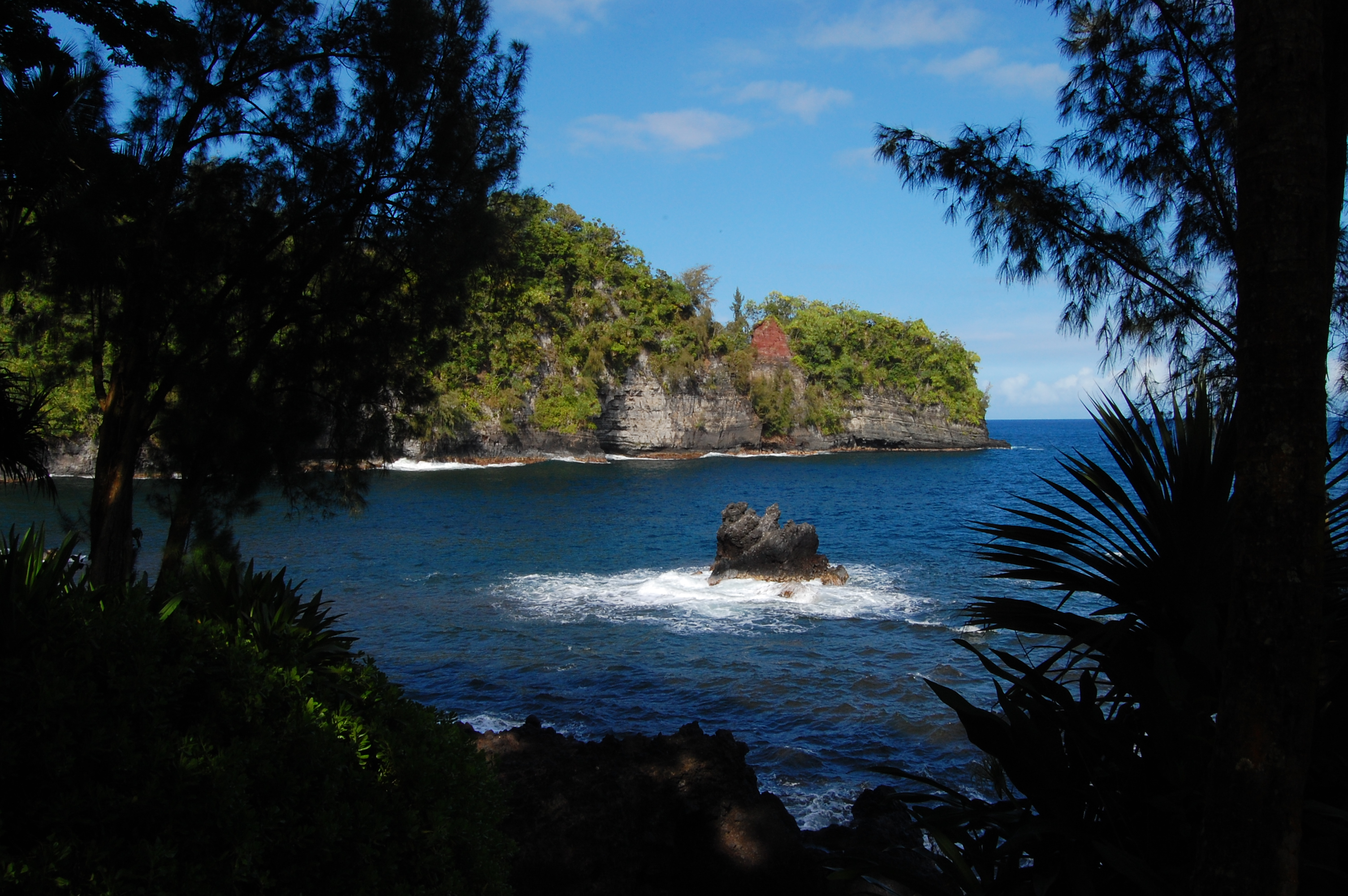
Onomea Bay

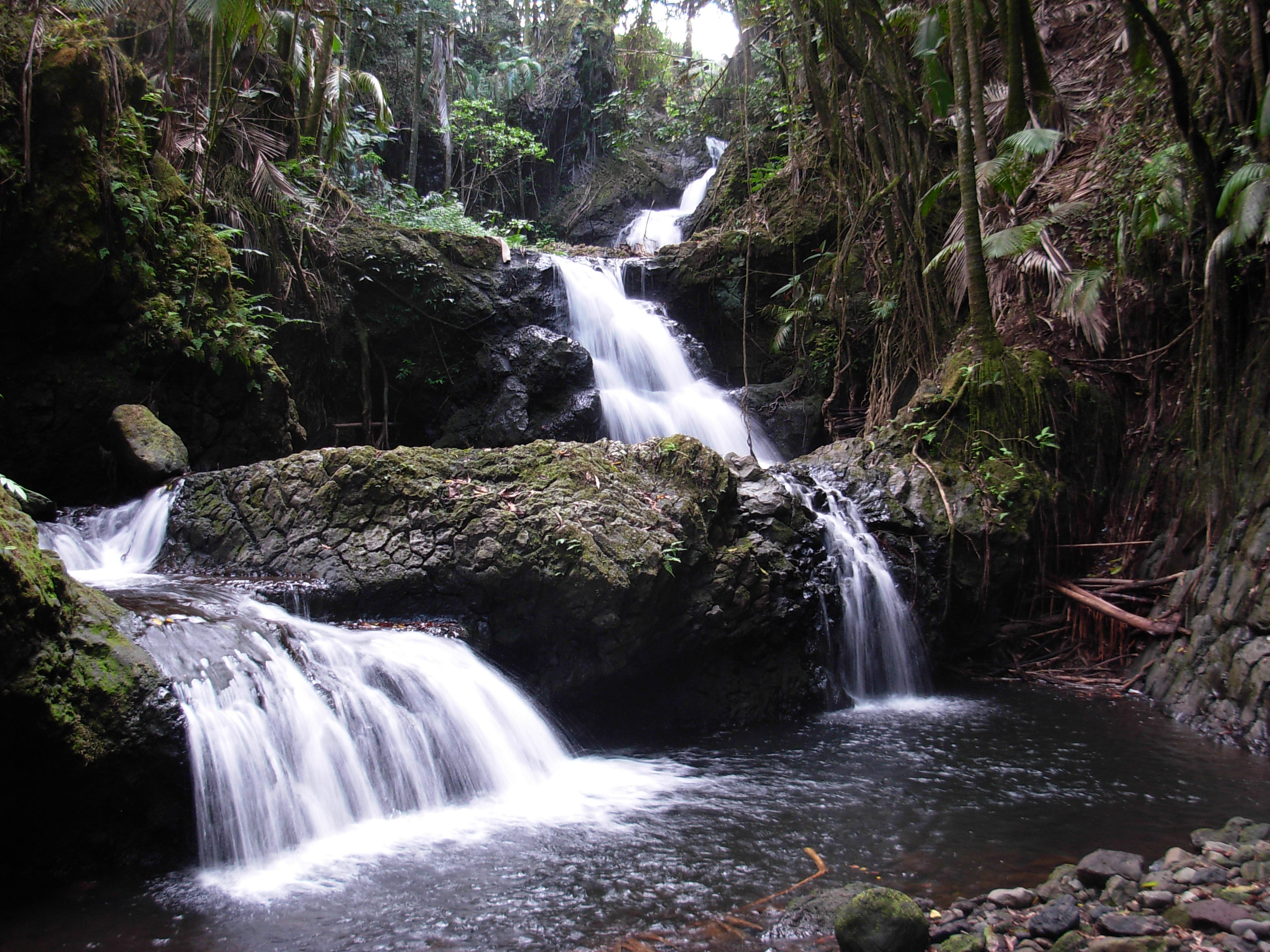
Multi-tiered Onomea Falls in Palm Jungle

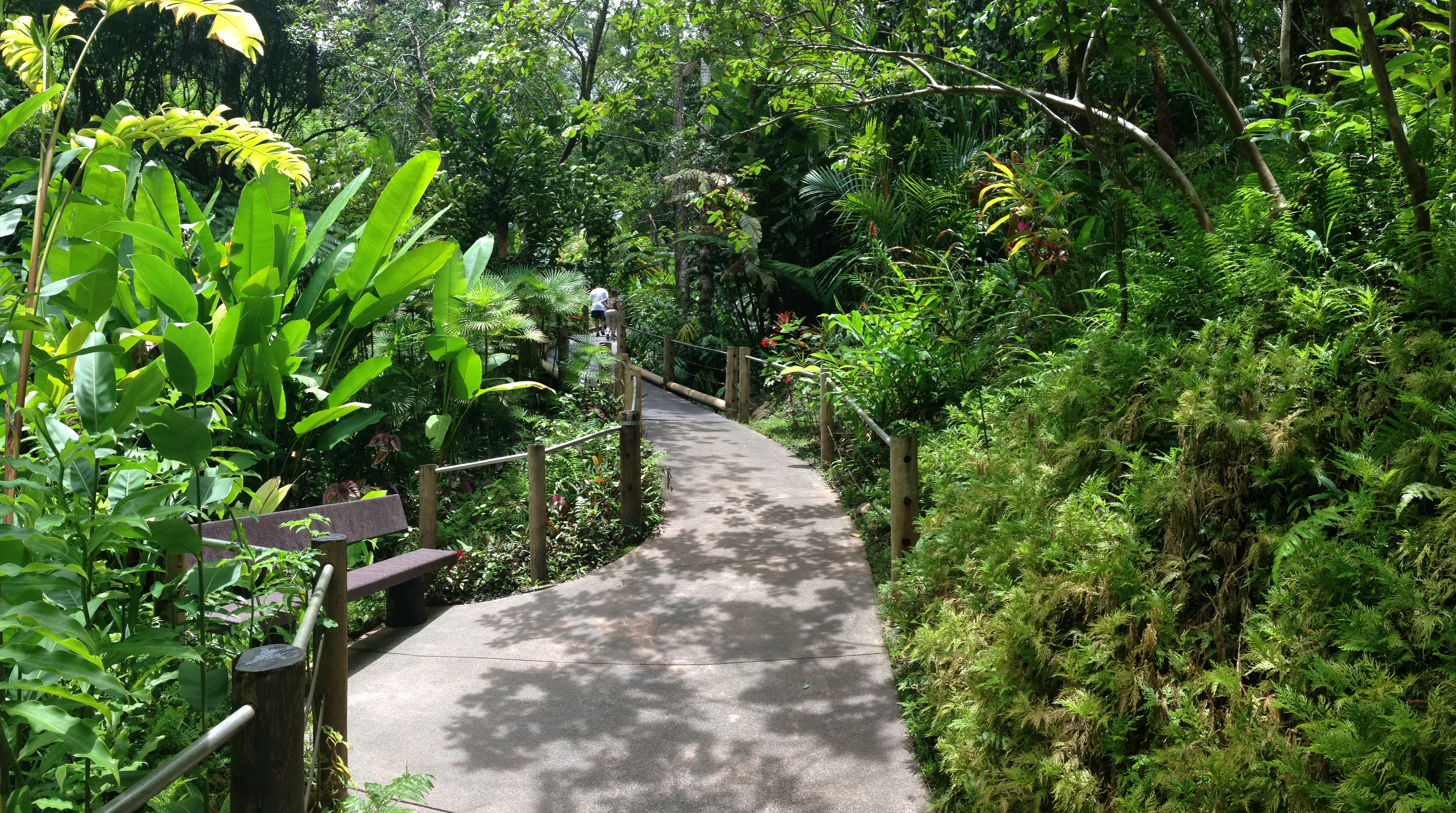
One of the pathways at the gardens.

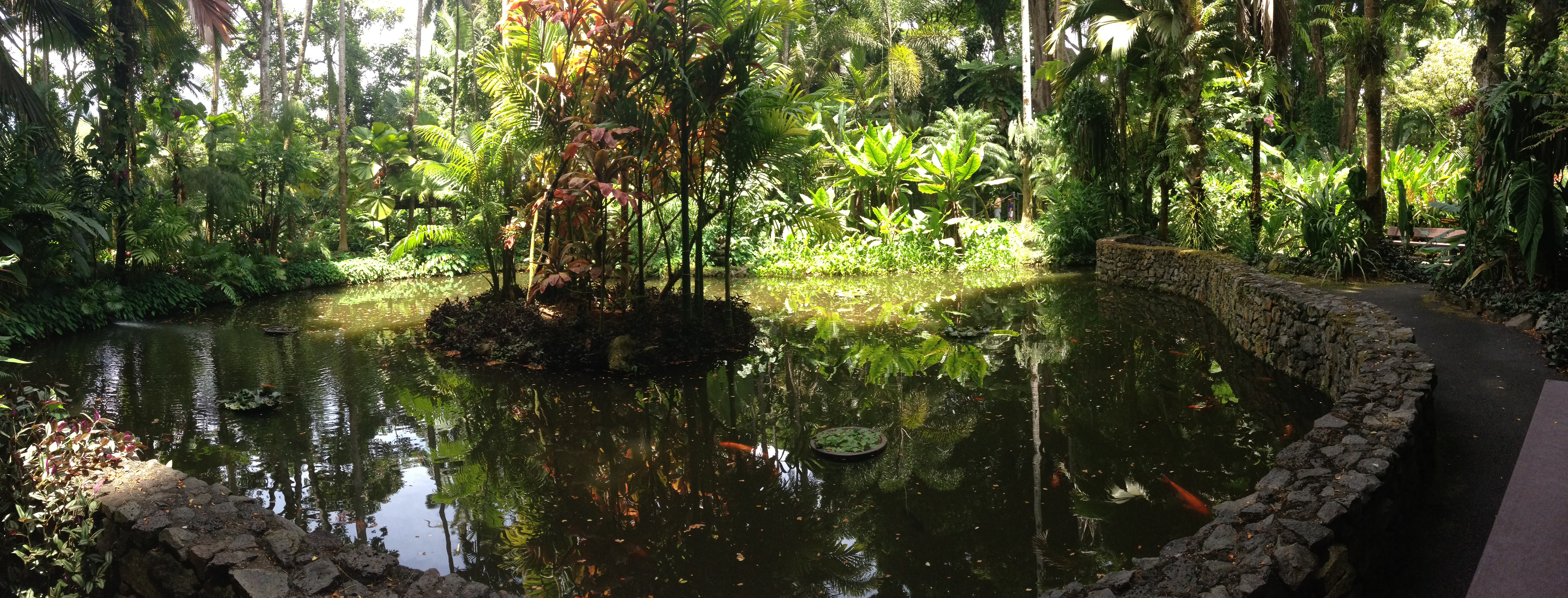
Panorama of the Lilypad Lake

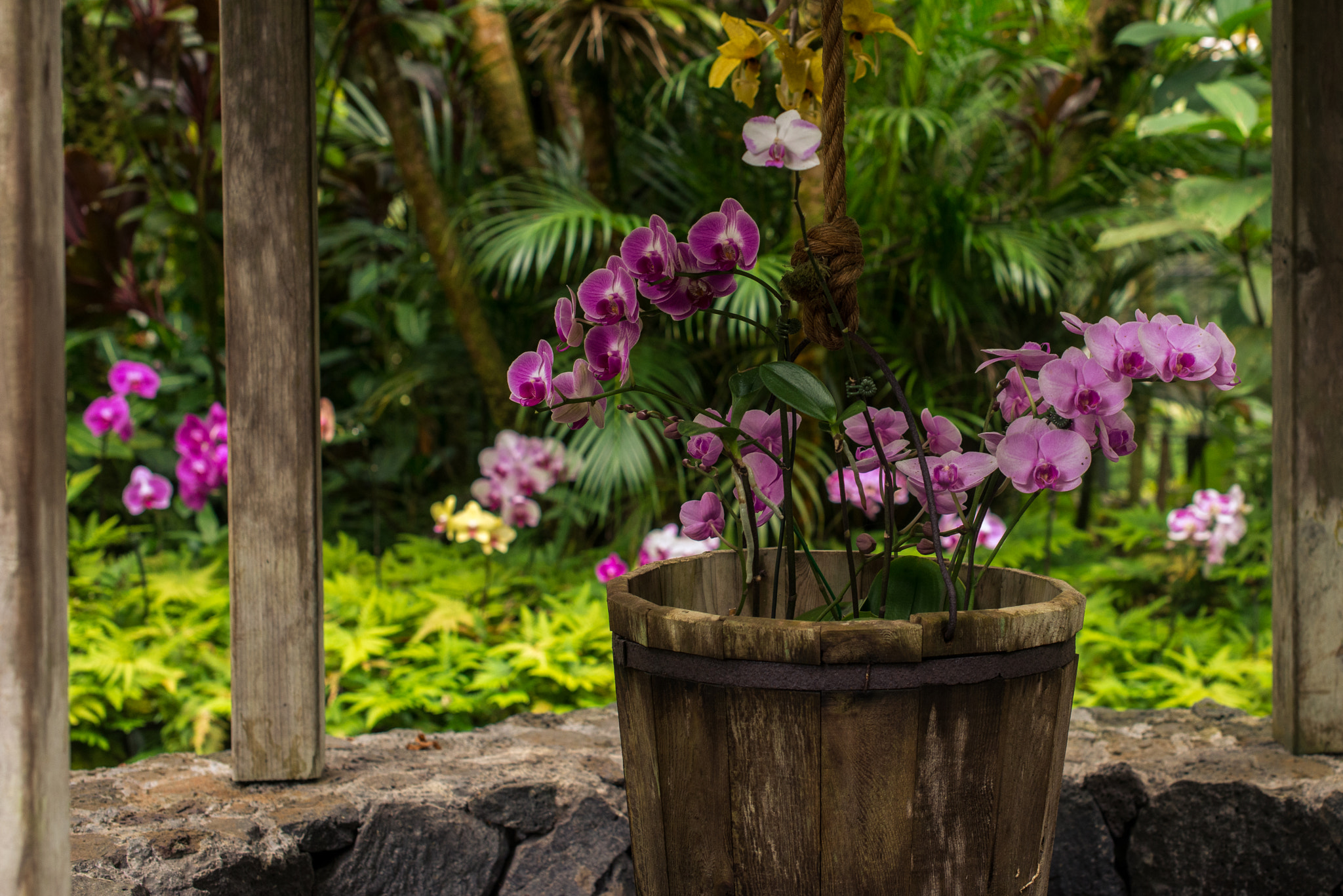
Orchid Garden at Hawaii Tropical Botanical Garden

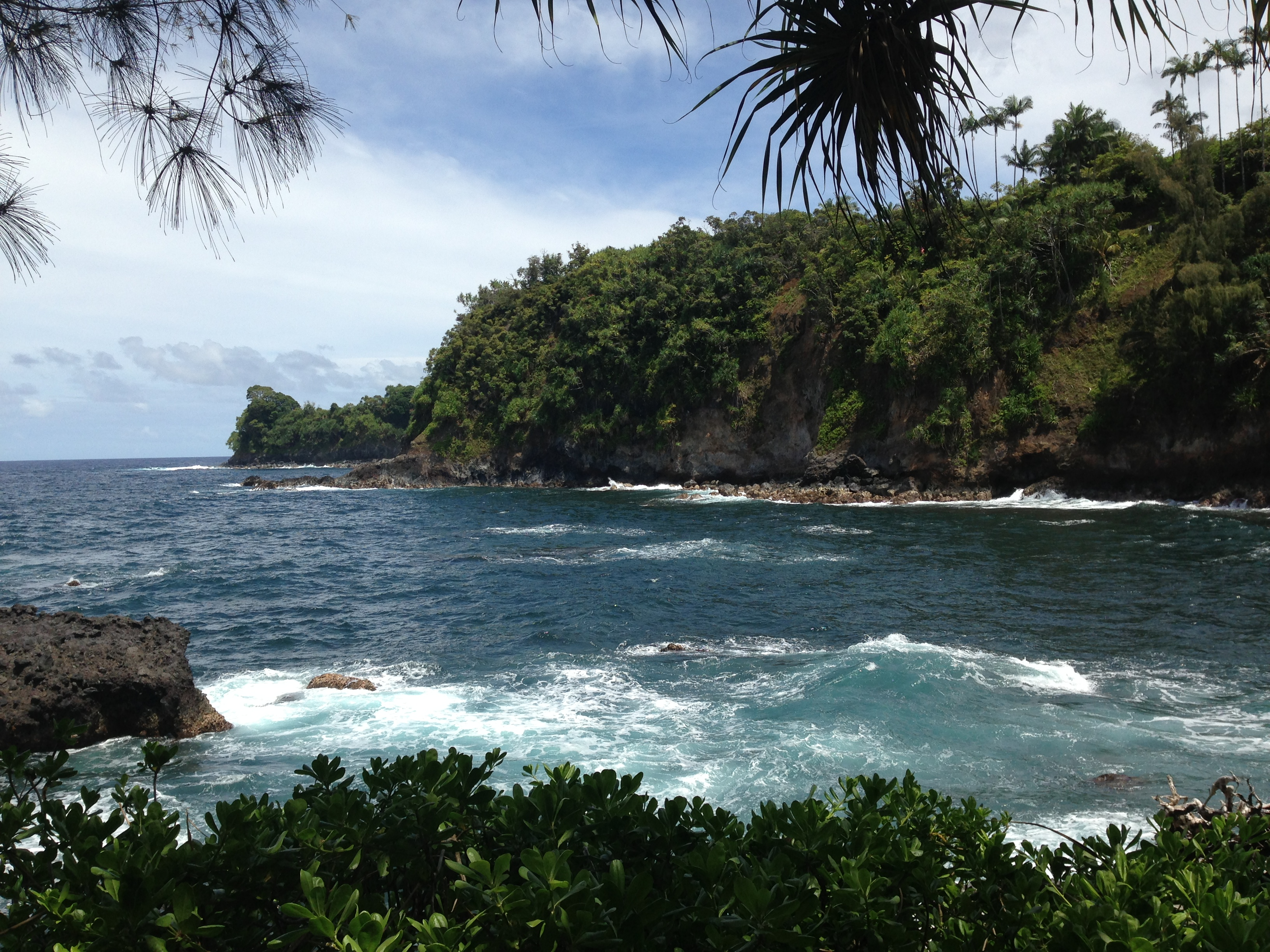
View of Onomea Bay from the lower Gardens

== See also ==
- List of botanical gardens in the United States
