= Four Seasons Resort Hualalai =

Luxury resort in Hawaii

Coordinates: 19°49′42″N 155°59′24″W

Four Seasons Resort Hualālai at Historic Kaʻūpūlehu
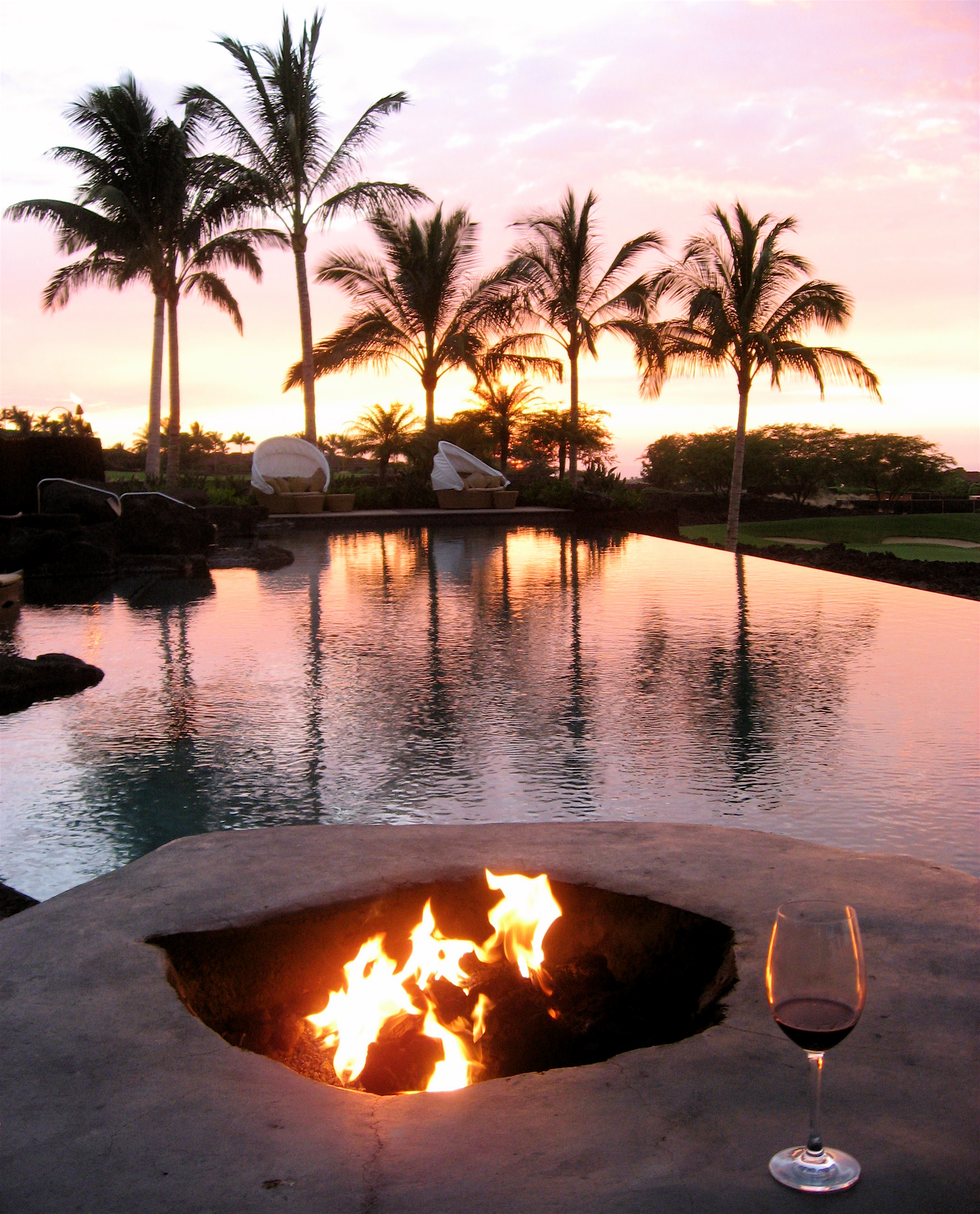
- Sunset by the pool
- Interactive map of the Four Seasons Resort Hualālai at Historic Kaʻūpūlehu area

General information
- Location: Kona District, Hawaii, near Kalaoa, 72-100 Ka'upulehu Drive, Kailua-Kona, Hawaii 96740-5610
- Opening: September 27, 1996

Technical details
- Floor area: 1,393,920 square feet (130,000 m^{2})

Design and construction
- Architect: Hill Glazier Architects

Other information
- Number of rooms: 243
- Number of suites: 51
- Number of restaurants: 3

Website
- http://www.fourseasons.com/hualalai/

Four Seasons Resort Hualalai at Historic Kaʻūpūlehu is a AAA Five Diamond rated Four Seasons resort in Kaʻūpūlehu, on the Kona-Kohala Coast of the island of Hawaiʻi.

The tsunami from the 2011 Tōhoku earthquake damaged the resort and forced it to close for six weeks (until April 30) for repairs. The tsunami affected the pool area and grounds, a restaurant, and twelve guest rooms. In 2020, the resort underwent a multi-million dollar renovation.

== Location ==
The hotel is located on the Island of Hawaiʻi, in Kailua-Kona, on the site of an ancient Hawaiian fishing village of Kaʻūpūlehu.

== Development ==
Project development began in 1989, with initial construction on the estimated $200 million resort starting in October 1990, with Taisei Hawaii Corp. and Kajima Engineering & Construction Inc. as the general contractors. 358 rooms were planned by Kaupulehu Venture, with investment by Cosmo World Corp. However, a global economic slowdown stopped development in 1991, and the project languished until 1994 when it was completely redesigned from the bottom up. The hotel opened for business in 1996.

The Hualalai Resort master plan was produced by Belt Collins & Associates (Now Bowers + Kubota Consulting). During the planning process, several anchialine pools and a historic Hawaiian trail were found on the shoreline. The saltwater pools were restored and preserved by site designers as part of the development and their natural features emphasized as an attraction. HKS Hill Glazier Studio of Palo Alto, California received the commission for the Four Seasons hotel. To keep costs down, the developer, hotel operator, and architects collaborated to reduce the initial size of each room, saving millions.

== Design ==
Hill Glazier Architects designed two-story bungalows arranged in the shape of a crescent, forming a kipuka. The "low-scale post-and-beam structures" of ancient Hawaiian villages influenced the style, incorporating "broad overhangs, exposed eaves, and loosely defined interior and exterior spaces". Structures and hotel services were designed as "open-air pavilions with unobstructed views of the Pacific Ocean". To add authenticity, Honduran Mahogany, koa, bamboo, and teak were used in the exterior and interior. Rooms are furnished in Hawaiian-style decor, with the addition of Native Hawaiian bedspreads. Landscape design was completed by Bill Bensley Design Group of Thailand.

After almost eight years of planning, development, and construction, the resort opened in September 1996.

== Features ==
=== Hotel ===
Guest services selects employees for the resort after subjecting them to at least five different interviews.

=== Restaurants ===
The hotel currently has four restaurants: Miller and Lux, Ulu Ocean Grill + Sushi Lounge, Beach Tree Bar & Lounge, Residence Beach House. Menus typically feature Big Island-grown and raised items such as avocado, goat cheese, red and yellow tomatoes, mushrooms, lobster, fish, organic honey, and abalone.

=== Spa ===
28,000 square feet (2,600 m^{2}) tropical garden spa, featuring eleven different types of massages and facials.

=== Cultural Center ===
The Kaʻupulehu Cultural Center teaches visitors about Hawaiian culture and history with programs and lessons held throughout the week. Guests can take ʻukulele classes and learn the art of hula and lei making. The center also hosts a collection of Native Hawaiian art, including 11 commissioned paintings by artist Herb Kawainui Kane.

== Critical review ==
Four Seasons Hualalai was among the 100 of Travel + Leisure's world's best resorts awards in a readers poll in 2007, 2008, and 2009, and ranked in several "top lists" by Zagat Surveys. Condé Nast Traveler placed the resort on their "Gold list" for best resorts since 2005.

As of 2009 Four Seasons Resort Hualalai was one of only three AAA Five Diamond Award winning hotels in Hawaii. In 2010 it added the Forbes (formerly Mobil) Five-Star Award, one of only two in the state. A par-72 18-hole golf course was designed by Jack Nicklaus. Golf Magazine ranked the course one of the best in America to play in 2002 and it annually hosts the Champions Tour's Mitsubishi Electric Championship at Hualalai. Other amenities include spa services, six pools, and fitness facilities.

In 2010, TripAdvisor named the resort the top celebrity honeymoon hotel destination.
