= Pua Mau Place Arboretum and Botanical Garden =

Nonprofit arboretum and botanical garden in Hawaii, United States

Coordinates: 20.0710°N 155.8441°W

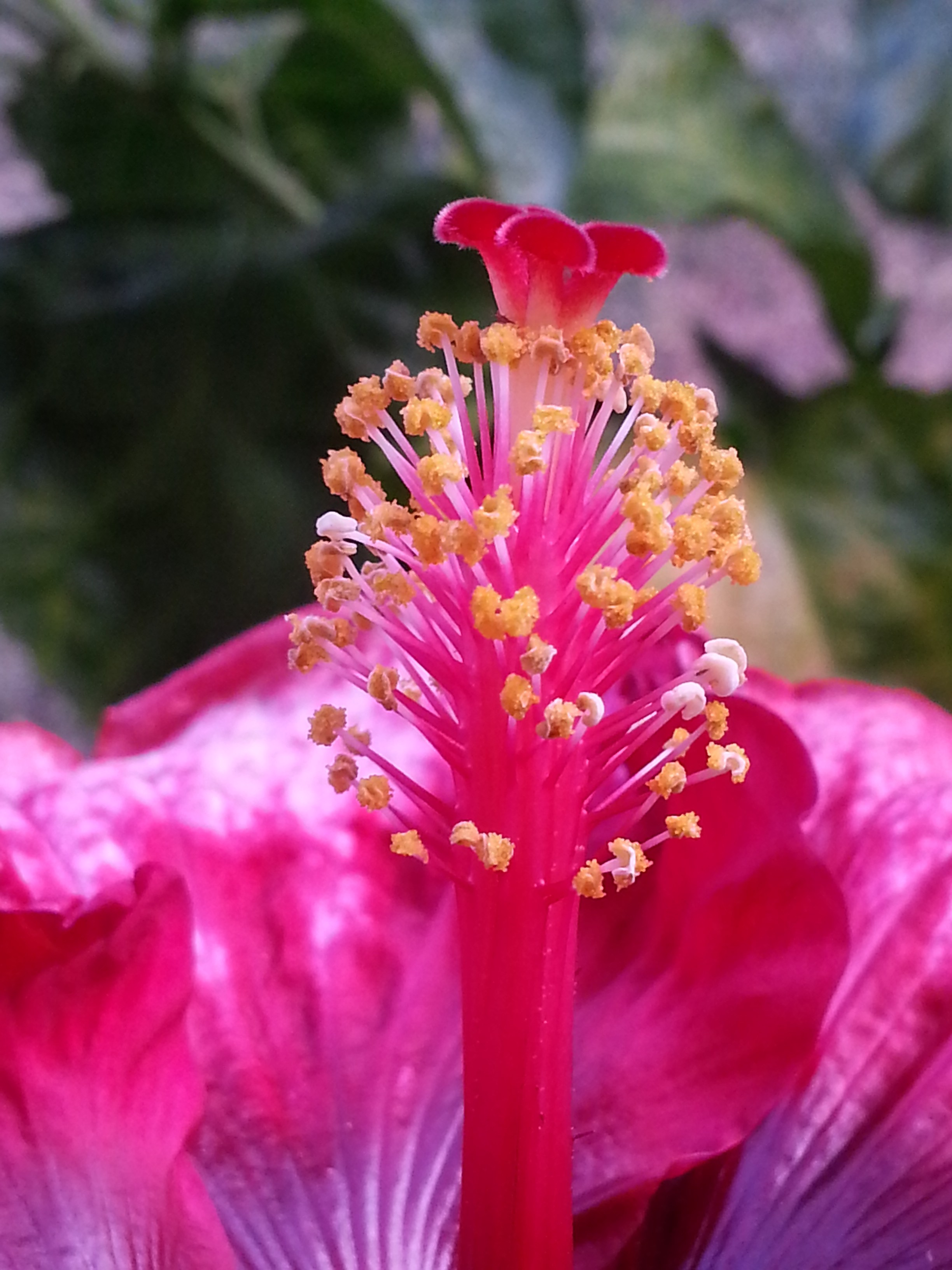
- Interactive map of Pua Mau Place Arboretum and Botanical Garden

Pua Mau Place Arboretum and Botanical Garden (45 acres) is an early-stage, nonprofit arboretum and botanical garden located off Highway 270 at 10 Ala Kahua, Kawaihae, on the dry slopes of the Kohala Mountain Range on Hawaii (island), Hawaii. It is open daily with an admission fee.

The garden was established in 1974 by Dr. Virgil Place and friends to specialize in ever-blooming (pua mau) woody plants. Its stated mission is to promote awareness of, and conduct research on, the uses of flowering plants in a Hawaiian arid environment for ornamental, agricultural, and bio-regional purposes.

The garden currently features a maze planted with over 200 varieties of hibiscus, outdoor sculpture, and an aviary with about 150 peafowl and guineafowl. Plants are marked and an information booklet is available.

== See also ==
- List of botanical gardens in the United States
