= Nani Mau Gardens =

Botanical gardens in Hilo, Hawaii, United States

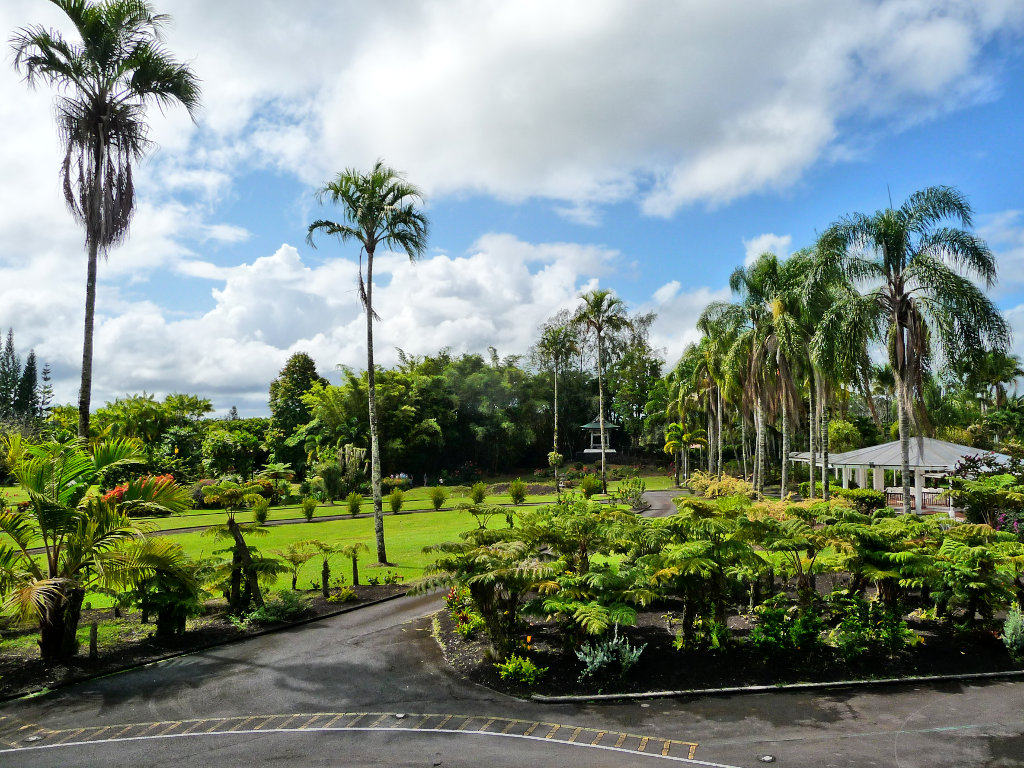
- Interactive map of Nani Mau Gardens
- Website: www.nanimaugardens.com

Nani Mau Gardens (20 acres) are commercial botanical gardens located at 421 Makalika Street, Hilo, Hawaiʻi on the island of Hawaiʻi, coordinates 19°40′20″N 155°3′17″W. The gardens' name, Nani Mau, means "forever beautiful". They were established by Makato Nitahara and opened to the public in 1972.

== Exhibits ==
Today the gardens claim to contain more than 2,000 plant varieties, with approximately 225 types of flowering plants, including 100 species of fruit trees; and over 2,300 orchids, said to be one of the world's largest collections of Paphiopedilum, Phalaenopsis, Epiphytes, Oncidium, and Cattleya orchids. The gardens also contain a number of trees planted by famous visitors.

Major garden features include an anthurium grove, Japanese-style bell tower (built from 20,000 boards without nails or screws), botanical museum, butterfly house, European garden, fruit orchard, ginger garden, hibiscus garden, Japanese gardens, orchid display, palms and coconut trees, and water garden.

== Botanical museum ==
The botanical museum contains exhibits about the nature of the island's tropical plants, the threats to their existence, and their role and uses in Hawaiian culture and art.

== See also ==
- List of botanical gardens in the United States
