= Wao Kele o Puna =

Lowland wet forest in Hawai'i

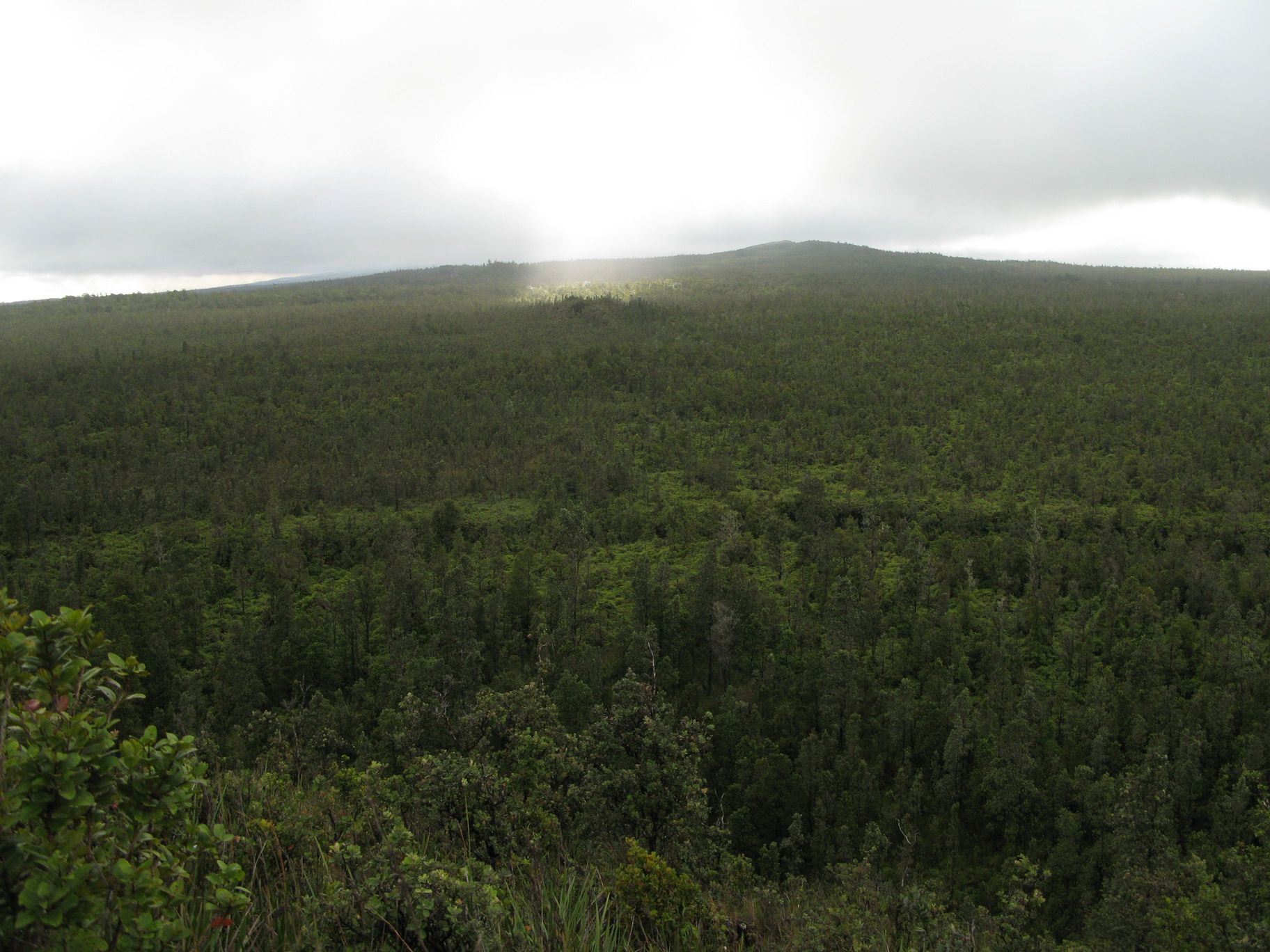
The forest of Wao Kele O Puna

Wao Kele O Puna (Wao Kele) is Hawaiʻi's largest remaining lowland wet forest, about 15 mi (24 km) south of the city of Hilo, along the East Rift Zone of Kīlauea volcano on the Island of Hawaiʻi. The name means the upland rainforest of Puna. Puna is one of 9 districts on the island. Lava from Kīlauea continues to flow onto forest land.

In 2006, the Trust for Public Land (TPL) purchased Wao Kele, ending a twenty-year struggle to prevent tapping the sizeable geothermal energy resources that lie below it. Opponents believe that the area is the home of the fire goddess Pele. It is also known as the Puna Forest Reserve, located just east of the Puʻu ʻŌʻō vent.

== History ==
The state of Hawaiʻi owned Wao Kele until 1986, when the then Campbell Estate exchanged Kahaualeʻa, an adjacent forest parcel, for it at the state's request. Campbell Estate was a private, for-profit trust set up for the heirs of Scottish-Irish carpenter James Campbell, established in 1900 and dissolved in 2007. Campbell bought more than 84,000 acres (34,000 ha) of Hawaiʻi land before his death.

Environmentalists proposed the trade because they considered Kahaualeʻa to be in better condition than Wao Kele. The Pele Defense Fund, however, sued, arguing that privatizing Wao Kele would end traditional hunting and gathering by native Hawaiians. The suit led to a controversial Hawaiʻi State Supreme Court ruling that granted natives access to such private property.

In the 2006 transaction, TPL paid $3.65 million for Wao Kele, $131/acre, using $3.4 million in U.S. Forest Service Forest Legacy program money, along with $250,000 from the Office of Hawaiʻian Affairs (OHA). TPL then transferred title to OHA.

On 28 August 2007 OHA took formal ownership of Wao Kele. The office of Hawaiian Affairs acquired Wao Kele o Puna, in order to protect its natural and cultural resources as well as the traditional and customary rights of Native Hawaiians accessing the property. The Hawaiʻi Department of Land and Natural Resources' Division of Forestry and Wildlife is responsible for managing the land until 2017.

== Geothermal energy ==
Wao Kele is licensed for geothermal energy development until 31 January 2016. As of 2009, Hawaiʻi uses the permit only to monitor two existing geothermal wells. OHA has no plans for further development. The Hawaiʻi Legislature has provided $2 million to plug the existing TrueMid-Pacific well with sand and concrete in 2009.

The state of Hawaiʻi has substantial geothermal resources, which could dramatically reduce fossil fuel use and energy prices there if the energy can be extracted without damage to the surrounding environment and in accordance with Hawaiʻian law and culture. Geologists estimate that the Big Island alone has the potential to generate 500–700 megawatts of electricity.

Wao Kele came to the attention of geothermal developers after other private sites became inundated with fresh lava from Kīlauea, at depths ranging up to 300 ft (91 m). Developers claim that 100 megawatts of power could be generated from only 300 of the forest's nearly 28,000 acres (11,000 ha), enough to provide all the electricity for the island's 175,000 residents.

Opponents allege health and safety problems from natural volcanic hydrogen sulfide gas emissions. A separate plant (Puna Geothermal Venture) went online in 1993 in Puna's Lower East Rift Zone and continued to generate 25–30 megawatts of electricity. PGV was closed in May 2018 due to intrusion of lava from the 2018 lower Puna eruption, before a partial resumption of operations in November 2020.

== The forest ==
At 27,785 acres (11,244 ha), Wao Kele is Hawaiʻi's largest lowland wet forest. It is home to numerous primary and rare plant species including hāpuʻu ferns (Cibotium spp.), ʻieʻie vines (Freycinetia arborea), and kōpiko (Psychotria mariniana), some of which help to limit invasive species' incursions. ʻOpeʻapeʻa (Hawaiian hoary bat, Lasiurus cinereus semotus) ʻio (Hawaiian hawk, Buteo solitarius), common ʻamakihi (Hemignathus virens), and nananana makakiʻi (happy-face spider, Theridion grallator) live in the trees. There are thought to be many more as-yet-undocumented species within the forest. Wao Kele's primary forest tree is ʻōhiʻa lehua (Metrosideros polymorpha).

Wao Kele occupies approximately one-fifth of the watershed that feeds the Pahoa aquifer.

The Wao Kele o Puna Reserve is threatened by a number of invasive species, including strawberry guava (Psidium cattleianum), Molucca albizia (Falcataria moluccana), Koster's curse (Clidemia hirta), and glory bush (Tibouchina herbacea). Albizia occurs widely in the surrounding area, but is limited to a relatively small number of sites within the reserve. Large patches of strawberry guava occur within the reserve.

== Myths ==
When Pele came to the island of Hawai'i she found that there was another god of fire currently in possession of the territory. ʻAilāʻau was known and feared by all the people residing in the area. His name, 'Ai means "one who eats or devours." Lāʻau means "tree" or "forest", therefore the God of Fire's name translated to devouring forests. Time and time again, he spread his wrath over the southern districts of Hawai'i creating the desolate lava fields.

Translation of the account of Pele taking over Kilauea:

When Pele came to the island Hawaiʻi, she first stopped at a place called Keahialaka in the district of Puna. From this place she began her inland journey toward the mountains. As she passed on her way there grew within her an intense desire to go at once and see ʻAilāʻau, the god to whom Kılauea belonged, and find a ̄ resting-place with him as the end of her journey. She came up, but ʻAilāʻau was not in his house. Of a truth he had made himself thoroughly lost. He had vanished because he knew that this one coming toward him was Pele. He had seen her toiling down by the sea at Keahialaka. Trembling dread and heavy fear overpowered him. He ran away and was entirely lost. When he came to that pit she laid out the plan for her abiding home, beginning at once to dig up the foundations. She dug day and night and found that this place fulfilled all her desires. Therefore, she fastened herself tight to Hawaiʻi for all time. These are the words in which the legend disposes of this ancient god of volcanic fires. He disappears from Hawaiian thought and Pele from a foreign land finds a satisfactory crater in which her spirit power can always dig up everlastingly overflowing fountains of raging lava.
