= Pele Defense Fund =

The Pele Defense Fund (PDF) is a nonprofit organization dedicated to defending traditional Hawaiian rights and customs, especially those related to the Hawaiian goddess Pele.

== Founding ==
The PDF was founded in April 1985 to protect Pele and the rights of Native Hawaiians. The founders are Palikapuokamohoaliʻi Dedman, Dr. Noa Emmett Aluli, and Lehua Lopez, with the titles president, vice president, and secretary-treasurer respectively.

== Activities ==
Protecting the Wao Kele O Puna rainforest was a primary reason for the creation of the PDF and protecting it has been the focus of many of the organization's activities. They view geothermal development of the area as a threat to their ability to practice religion. Dedman, the PDF president, has compared the drilling in the rainforest to “trashing a Christian cathedral.” The PDF hired an outside consulting firm to evaluate the geothermal plans and firm estimated it would cost $4 billion, two to three times as much as the state estimated.

=== 1988 Ad Campaign ===
In February 1988, the PDF worked with the Public Media Center in San Francisco to run full-page ads in the Sunday edition of nine newspapers.

The campaign included a $35,000 ad in the New York Times with the text “Come to Hawaii. Swim in polluted water. Breathe toxic fumes. See ugly electric towers.” The ad, which asked people to send protest coupons to Governor Waiheʻe and Senator Daniel Inouye, raised enough money to cover its cost and gained support from environmental groups and national attention. Financial and energy experts from the mainland studied the plan for geothermal drilling and issued assessments on the cost and feasibility that were contrary to the state's claims.

After the campaign, the PDF raised major funding from sources including the Alexander Gerbode Foundation and the Tides Foundation and Wao Kele O Puna gained the attention of efforts to protect rainforests across the world.

=== Protest ===
On March 25, 1990, a protest by the Pele Defense Fund organized 1,500 Pele practitioners and supporters to attempt to enter the drilling site at Wao Kele O Puna and conduct a religious ceremony. The protest resulted in 141 people charged with trespassing. The protest was one of Hawaii's largest acts of civil disobedience and the largest single act of peaceful disobedience in the United States to save a rainforest.

=== Court Cases ===
The PDF has filed over a dozen court actions.

- In Pele Defense Fund v. William Paty, et al. the Hawaiʻi Supreme Court ruling set a controversial precedent that a practitioner's customary and traditional rights are not limited to the ahupuaʻa in which the practitioner resides.
- In Aluli v. Lewin the Hawaiʻi State Supreme Court ruled that permits for geothermal drilling are not to be issued until the Department of Health sets rules for ambient air quality.
