= KTA Super Stores =

Hawaiian grocery store chain

- Trade name: KTA Super Stores
- Company type: Private
- Industry: Retail
- Founded: 1916
- Founder: Koichi and Taniyo Taniguchi
- Headquarters: Hilo, Hawaii, United States, Hilo, United States
- Area served: Big Island, Hawaii

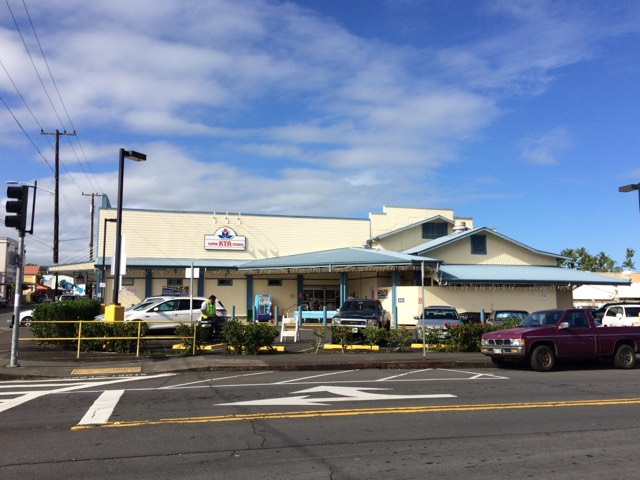
KTA Super Store in downtown Hilo, Hawaii, USA, at a busy intersection on Hawaii State Highway 19.

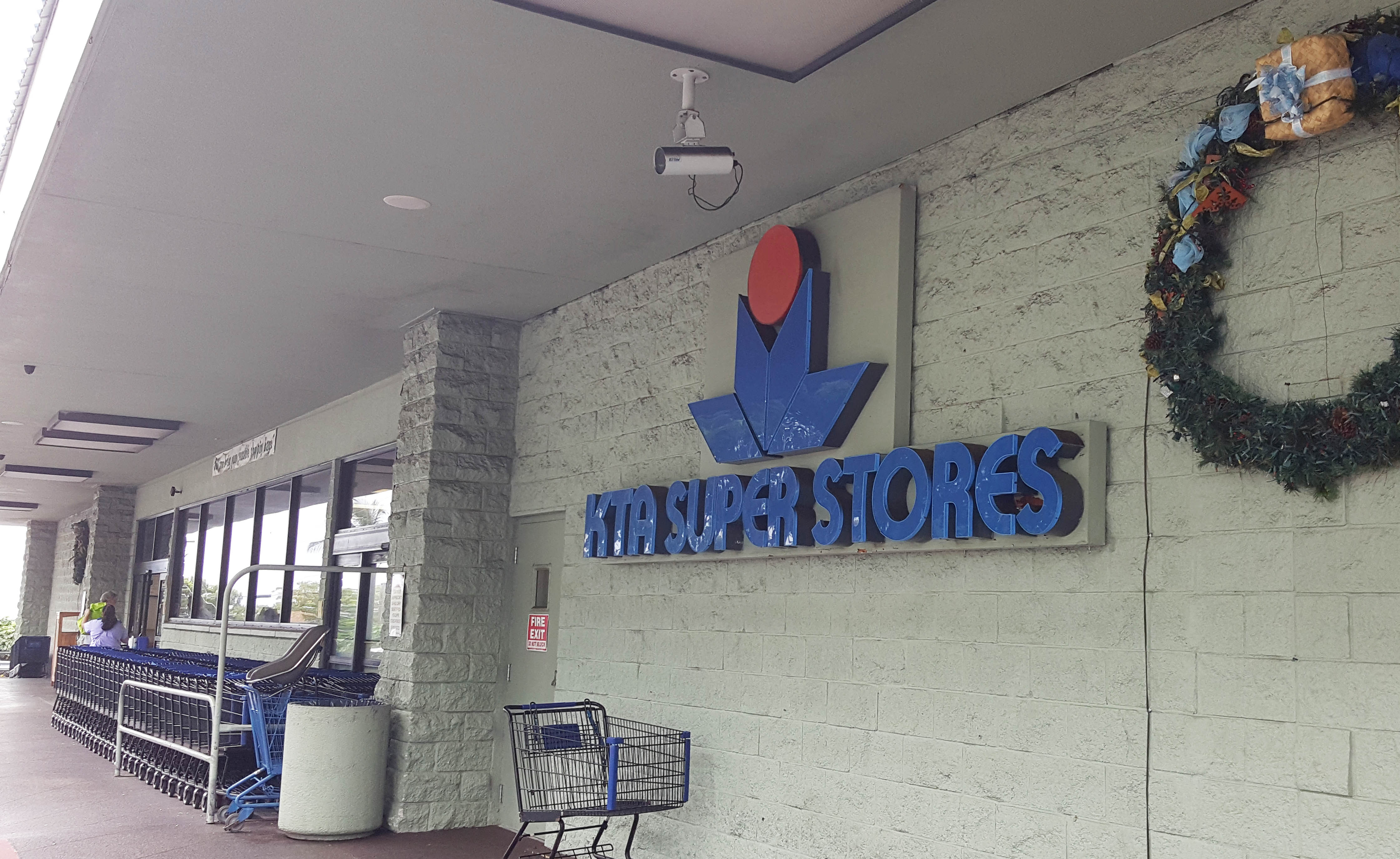
KTA Super Store in Kailua Kona, Hawaii, USA.

KTA Super Stores is an American company with its headquarters in Hilo, Hawaii, United States, and has the largest network of supermarkets on the Big Island.

== History ==
KTA Super Stores' history goes back to 1916, when Koichi and Taniyo Taniguchi established a small food store in Hilo, Hawaii to serve sugar plantation workers. The K and T in the name were for the founders, with an A being used to differentiate from any stores using the other initials.

The original KTA was destroyed in the tsunami of the 1946 Aleutian Islands earthquake. After reopening, it expanded into a supermarket.

In 2025, KTA had eight stores across Hawaii Island.

== See also ==
- Foodland Hawaii
