= Manago Hotel =

Award winning Hawaiian restaurant

- Interactive map of Manago Hotel

Restaurant information
- Established: 1917
- Owner(s): Dwight & Cheryl Manago
- Previous owner(s): 1st Generation: Kinzo & Osame Manago 2nd Generation: Harold & Nancy Manago
- Location: Captain Cook, HI 96704, Hawaii
- Coordinates: 19.490227665294427°N 155.91091013068677°W
- Website: https://www.managohotel.com/hotel-history/

Manago Hotel is a hotel and restaurant in Captain Cook, Hawaii on the island of Hawaii. It opened in 1917, originally as the home of Kinzo and Osame Manago, before eventually becoming a hotel. Since then the hotel has continued to provide affordable lodging and simple meals, with a total of 64 rooms and an accompanying restaurant. The restaurant serves classic Hawaiian regional cuisine, including locally famed pork chops. It is the longest continually running restaurant in Hawaii.

In 2023 it was named an America's Classic by the James Beard Foundation.

== History ==
The Manago Hotel was first the personal home of Kinzo and Osame Manago, where they lived and made udon noodles for purchase. Kinzo Manago immigrated to Hawaii while he was traveling to Canada to study English, when his traveling partner lost his money gambling he searched for work. The Wallace family in Captain Cook hired him as a cook, where he saved his money for a picture bride, his future wife Osame. After taking a $100 loan from the Wallace's, they purchased their home where they sold udon, jam, coffee, and other foods. Once their second child was born, they added another room to the building, and soon taxi drivers and salesmen traveling between Hilo and Kona asked if they could stay the night. They started charging between 50 cents and $1 for a bed or a futon on the floor. In 1929 they expanded to a second floor of rooms and started serving full meals and sake.

During World War II, Kinzo and Osame were contacted by the military to feed soldiers who were occupying the Konawaena High School. After the war, their son Harold Manago bought the land under the hotel to expand its acreage and guest rooms. Harold and his wife Nancy then became owners of the hotel. In 1970 the hotel expanded to its current capacity of 64 rooms.

In 1984, Dwight Manago and his wife Cheryl became owners of the hotel. On February 22, 2023, Manago Hotel was named a James Beard America's Classic, where sisters Britney and Taryn Manago run the restaurant. In January 2024 the County of Hawaii Affordable Housing Production Program awarded the nonprofit Mental Health Kokua $5.5 million in funds to purchase the hotel to convert it into affordable housing.

== Cuisine ==
The restaurant serves a simple array of items, mainly unchanged since the 1940s, for breakfast, lunch, and dinner. They serve many Hawaiian staples including Spam, local fish such as opelu and ono, and fried pork chops for which they are locally famous. Dishes are served with rice, and small sides called "Hawaiian Banchan" including macaroni salad. It is rumored the cast iron pan used for the pork chops is as old as the hotel.
