= Statue of Kamehameha I (Honolulu) =

Sculpture by Thomas Ridgeway Gould

Coordinates: 21°18′21″N 157°51′35″W

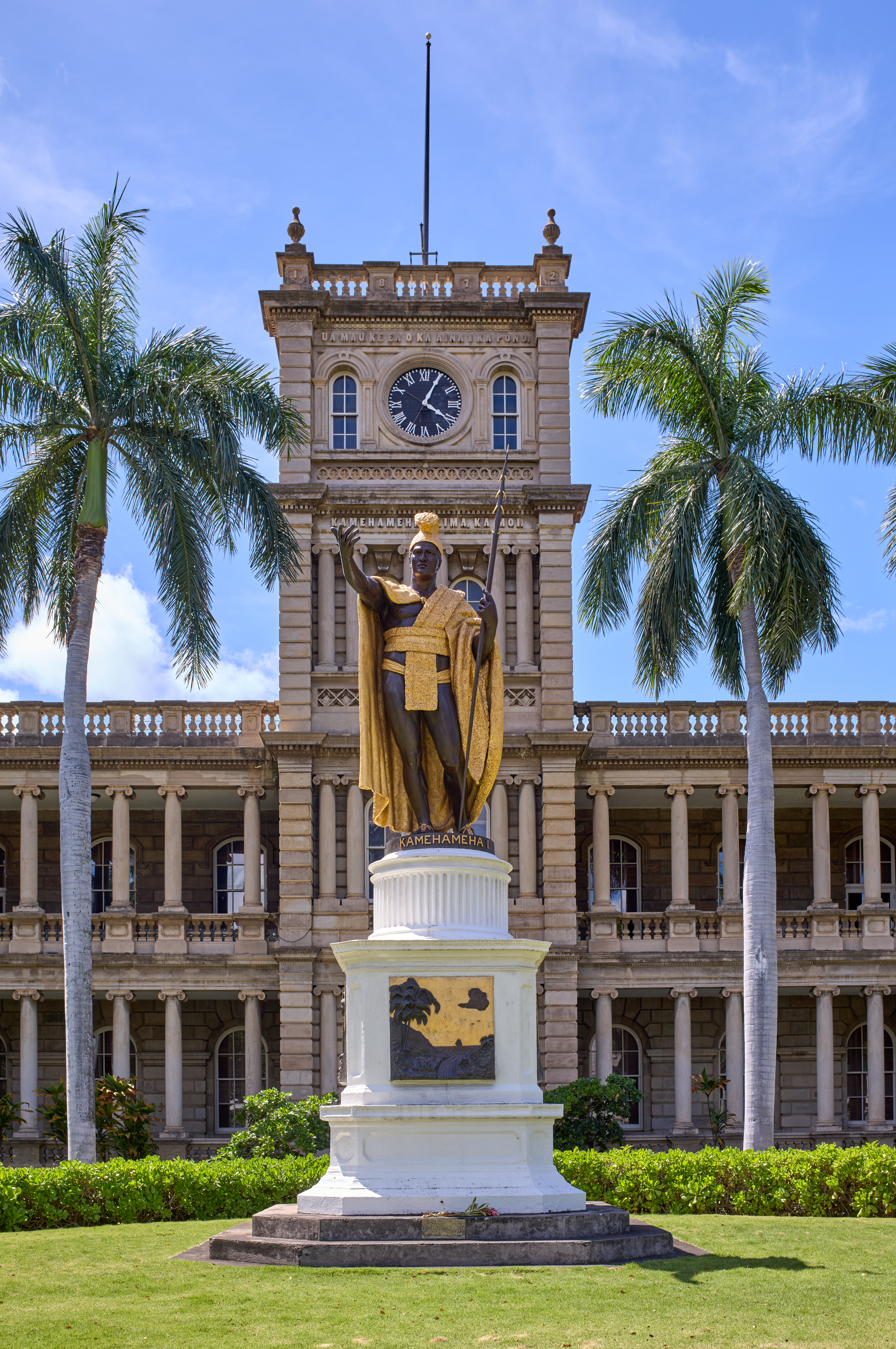
The statue of Kamehameha I in front of Aliʻiōlani Hale in Honolulu, Hawaiʻi, March 2024.

The Kamehameha I statue (Honolulu cast) is an outdoor sculpture by American artist Thomas Ridgeway Gould, erected in 1883. The first cast in the series, Kamehameha I statue (original cast), is located in North Kohala on the island of Hawaiʻi. The second cast stands outside the Aliʻiōlani Hale government building in Honolulu, located on the island of Oahu. Made of cast brass, it depicts Kamehameha I and has become a recognizable cultural symbol for the Hawaiian Islands.

== Description ==
The statue is an oversized brass cast of King Kamehameha I, the ruler credited with unifying the Hawaiian Islands in the early nineteenth century and establishing the Kingdom of Hawaiʻi in 1810. The surface is two-toned, finished with a dark brown chemical patina with gilded (See gilding) garments. Erected in 1883, it was commissioned as a replacement for Kamehameha the Great (original cast), which had been commissioned to celebrate the centennial of Captain James Cook’s arrival to the Hawaiian Islands. It was placed in front of the Aliʻiōlani Hale government building in Honolulu, the spot intended for the original cast, and remains there to this day.

== Historical information ==
=== Commission and delivery to Hawaiʻi ===
The history of the Kamehameha I statue (second cast) is closely tied to the history of the first cast. The idea behind both works originated in 1878, when Walter M. Gibson, a member of the Hawaiian legislature, decided to commission a sculpture to commemorate the centennial of the arrival of Captain James Cook to the Hawaiian Islands. Government money was allocated to fund the project, and Gibson was put in charge of the committee overseeing its production.

Gibson selected American artist Thomas Ridgeway Gould to create the statue, who finished the full-size plaster model for the work in 1880. The model was sent to the Barbedienne Foundry in Paris, France to be cast in brass, and the finished product was shipped to Hawaiʻi in August; however, the ship delivering the statue encountered a storm and sank near the Falkland Islands. To replace it, the second cast was commissioned by Hawaiʻi officials using the approximately $12,000 insurance settlement collected from the loss of the original. The replacement statue arrived in Honolulu in January, 1883, but the original cast had already been recovered from the sea and finally completed its journey to Hawaiʻi in March, 1882. Because the second cast was in better condition, it was decided that it, not the original, would be placed outside the Aliʻiolani Hale government building in Honolulu. Having arrived too late to be used in the celebration of Cook’s arrival to the Islands, its unveiling was instead incorporated into the coronation ceremonies of King David Kalākaua in February, 1883.

=== Features ===
See Features of Kamehameha I statue (original cast).

After the shipwreck and loss of the original statue, Gibson and Gould worked together to provide the replacement cast with one additional feature: four partial-gilt bas-relief panels to decorate the sides of the statue’s plinth, paid for with an additional $4,000 from the insurance settlement. Each panel depicted a scene from Kamehameha’s life, though Gibson wanted the panels to serve as a kind of propaganda, much like Trajan’s Column and other representations of heroic battles in classical monuments. As such, the historical accuracy of the events depicted in the reliefs is questionable; debate exists as to whether or not Kamehameha was even present at some of the events.

Gould returned to his studio in Florence to begin work on the reliefs, but died of a heart attack on November 26, 1881, after only managing to complete the maquette for the first relief. His son, Marshall S. Gould, completed the remaining three maquettes.

The scenes depicted on the panels include:

- Kamehameha’s first encounter with Captain James Cook, on board the Resolution (See HMS Resolution (1771)) off the coast of Lahaina in 1778.
- Kamehameha as a warrior, fending off a barrage of spears.
- Kamehameha as he reviews a war fleet off the coast of Kohala, Hawaiʻi.
- A group of travelers resting alongside a road, meant to illustrate Kamehameha’s Kānāwai Māmalahoe, his guarantee of free and safe access to roadways.

== Cultural significance ==
The Kamehameha I statue (second cast) has become an important political symbol for the Hawaiian Islands. It is featured on the official Hawaiian state seal (See Seal of Hawaii), and in the logo of the Kamehameha Schools, which has campuses located throughout the Islands. In 1959, a third Kamehameha I statue was cast using models from second cast, and placed in Sanctuary Hall inside the U.S. Capitol Building (See United States Capitol) in Washington, D.C. to honor Hawaiʻi becoming the fiftieth state. Various businesses, especially those working in the tourist trade, have capitalized on the resulting popularity of the sculpture; its image has been used to decorate brochures, postcards, T-shirts, folk-art, etc., and small reproductions of the sculpture are popular souvenirs in many shops.

The statue also features a prominent role in Kamehameha Day celebrations, the annual Hawaiian holiday celebrating the Kingdom of Hawaiʻi’s first monarch. During the festivities, the statue is ceremoniously draped in long lei, meant to honor Kamehameha I and his accomplishments.

== Additional casts and reproductions ==
Several additional casts and reproductions of Kamehameha I exist throughout Hawaiʻi and the continental United States, including:

1. Kamehameha I (original cast), located in Kapaʻau, North Kohala, on the Island of Hawaiʻi.
2. Statue of Kamehameha I (U.S. Capitol), located in National Statuary Hall in the U.S. Capitol Building in Washington, D.C.
3. Kamehameha I (Hilo reproduction), located in Hilo, Hawaiʻi.
