= Statue of Kamehameha I (U.S. Capitol) =

Statue representing the state of Hawaii

Kamehameha I
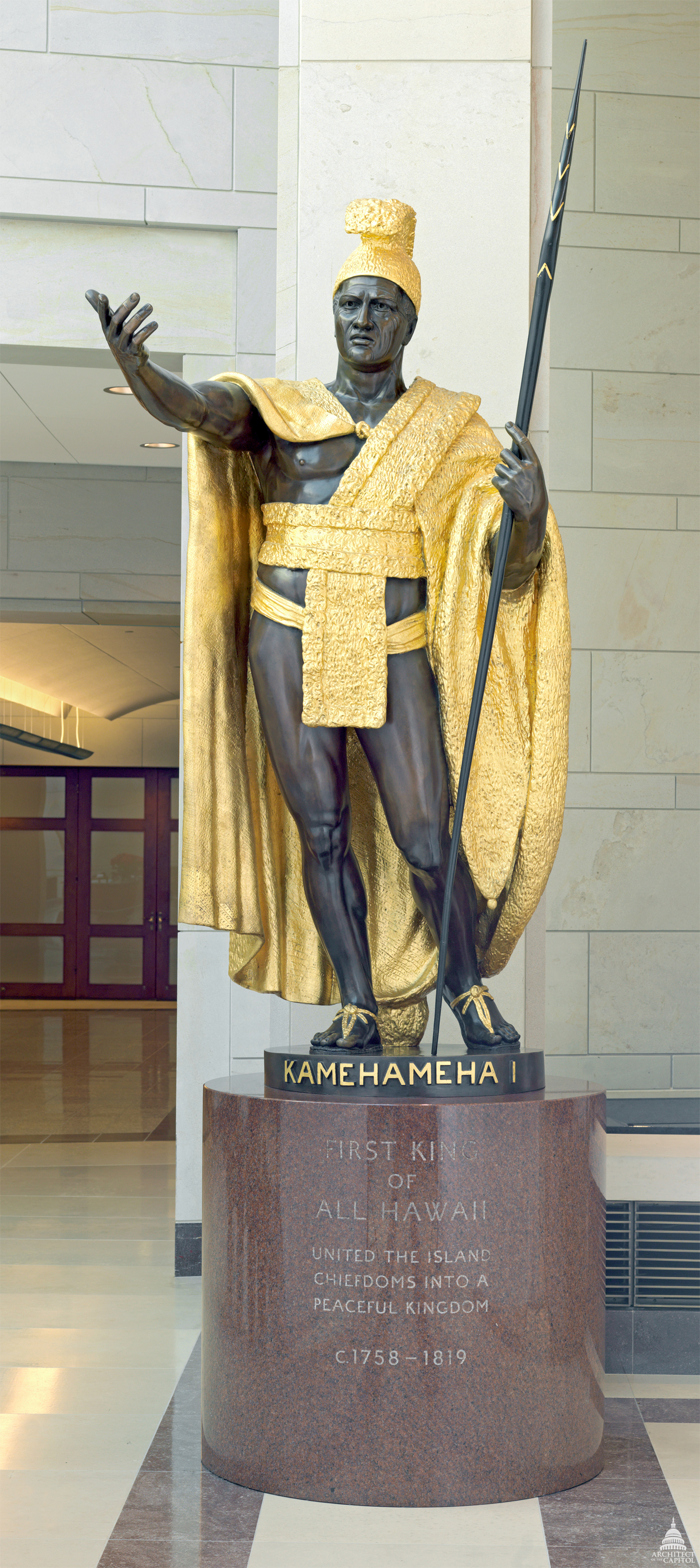
- The statue in the National Statuary Hall Collection
- Artist: Thomas Ridgeway Gould
- Medium: Bronze sculpture
- Subject: Kamehameha I
- Location: Washington, D.C., United States

Kamehameha I is a bronze sculpture depicting the founder and first ruler of the Kingdom of Hawaii of the same name by Thomas Ridgeway Gould, installed at the United States Capitol Visitor Center's Emancipation Hall, in Washington, D.C., as part of the National Statuary Hall Collection. A replica of the statue was given as a gift by the U.S. state of Hawaii in 1969.

== See also ==
- 1969 in art
- Kamehameha statues
  - Kamehameha statue (original cast)
