= Statue of John Bridge =

Sculpture in Cambridge, Massachusetts, U.S.

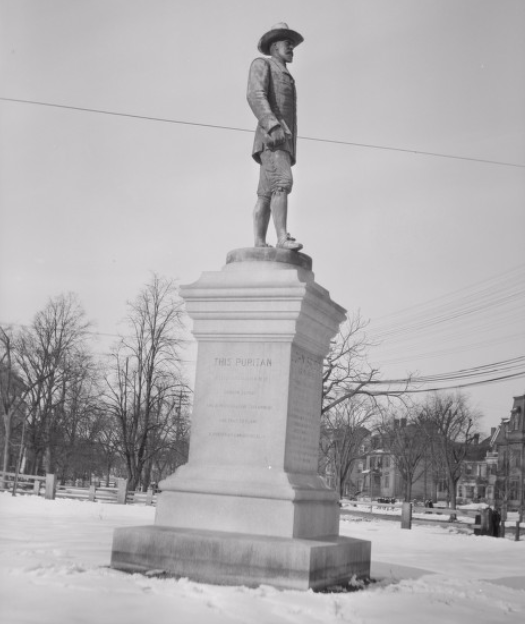

- Location within Massachusetts
- Subject: John Bridge
- Location: Cambridge Common, Cambridge, Massachusetts; 42.377472°N 71.120556°W

The John Bridge Monument (also known as The Puritan), in the northeast corner of the Cambridge Common in Cambridge, Massachusetts, was given by Samuel James Bridge in honor of his ancestor John Bridge (1578–1665) and sculpted by Thomas R. Gould.

== Description ==
The statue weighs 1800 pounds.

The figure is about nine feet and so is the pedestal.

The front of the statue's plinth reads:

JOHN BRIDGE • 1578–1665 • left braintree, essex county, england. 1631 • as a member of rev. mr. hooker's company • settled here 1632 • and stayed when that company • removed to connecticut. • he had supervision of the first public school • established in cambridge 1635 • was selectman 1635–1652 • deacon of the church 1636–1658 • representative to the great and general court 1637–1641 • and was appointed by that body to lay out lands • in this town and beyond.

The other three faces read:

THIS PURITAN • helped to establish here • church school • and representative government • and thus to plant • a Christian commonwealth.

Erected • and given to the city • september 20, 1882 • by Samuel James Bridge • of the sixth generation • from John Bridge.

"They that wait upon the Lord shall renew their strength."

== The Life of John Bridge ==
John Bridge was born in Essex, England in 1578.

He came to Cambridge in the 1630s in conjunction with the Braintree Company. John Bridge apparently helped to convince Thomas Shepard to come to Massachusetts. When some colonists led by Thomas Hooker left Cambridge for Connecticut, Bridge remained. He served as a selectman for multiple terms, and helped to supervise the local school.

He died in 1665, and was buried in Harvard Square.

Prior to donating the statue of his ancestor, Samuel J. Bridge added memorial stones over John Bridge's burial place on July 4, 1876.

== History of the Monument ==
The statue was dedicated on Nov. 28, 1882. It was donated by Samuel J. Bridge. It was sculpted by Thomas R. Gould and, after he died while working on it, his son Marshall S. Gould. Bridge also donated the statue of John Harvard on Harvard University's campus. Samuel J. Bridge served as appraiser of the port of Boston and, subsequently, appraiser general at San Francisco.

Dedication ceremonies took place at Shepard Memorial Church. Thomas Wentworth Higginson addressed the crowd on the occasion. Higginson described the statue as being noteworthy in representing "the common man," and even suggested that it was "the first time...that the every-day Puritan has appeared in sculpture." He further stated that Bridge "was one of those who kept back the Indian and brought civilization forward." Harvard President Charles William Eliot also addressed the crowd, and hailed how Bridge's life "foretold the life of the teeming millions who in two centuries were to vivify the wild continent."

At the time of its construction, some believed that the statue was "the first...of a Puritan pioneer that has been erected in New England."

A tablet in memory of Bridge was also placed in Shepard Memorial Church.

The statue accompanied many other Gilded Age erections of this genre, in which Puritans or Pilgrims stood for American ideals and reasserted a fantasy of the "moral values, social dominance, and political leadership of the nation's New England, and specifically Anglo Saxon, colonists." Other examples from the post-Civil War period include The Puritan by Augustus Saint-Gaudens in Springfield, Massachusetts, The Pilgrim also by Saint-Gaudens in Philadelphia, and The Pilgrim by John Quincy Adams Ward in Central Park.

The statue has been toppled on a number of occasions. In 1922, the figure was found with a rope around the neck, and newspapers speculated that "college boys or other young men of Cambridge" had committed the act. In 1935, it was found again toppled, this time with wire around the neck. It took several weeks for it to be restored.

== Sources ==
- Statue of John Bridge
- Genealogy of the John Bridge family in America, 1632–1924
- Statue of John Bridge
- Memorial of John Harvard: The Gift to Harvard University of Samuel James Bridge. Ceremonies at the Unveiling of the Statue, October 15, 1884. J. Wilson. 1884. p. 5.
