= Līloa's kāʻei =

Sacred Hawaiian feathered sash

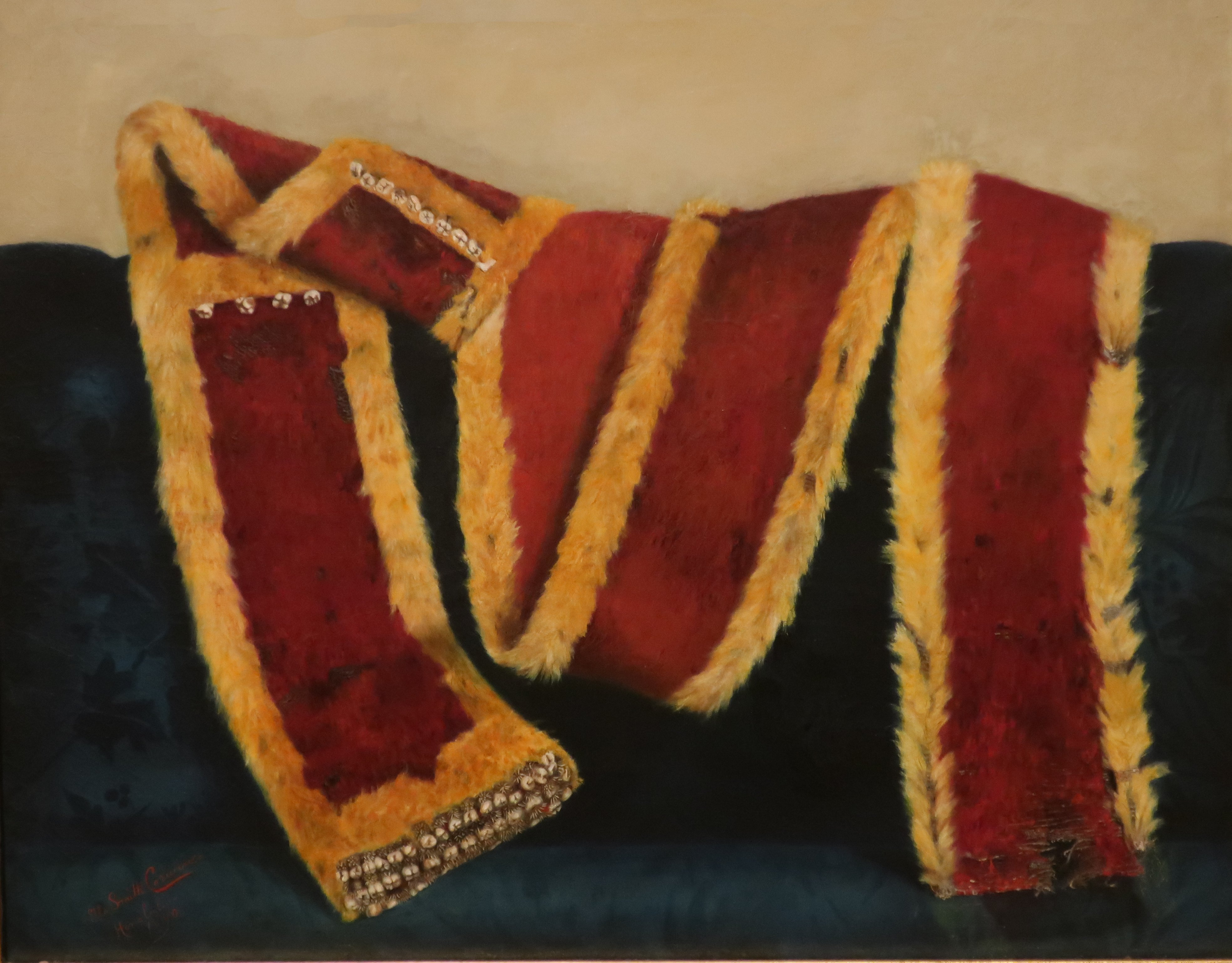
- The Royal Feather Cordon of King Liloa of Hawaii by Ella Smith Corwine, c. 1890
- Material: ʻiʻiwi, ʻōʻō and mamo feathers on an olonā base, with human and fish teeth
- Size: 14 ft (4.3 m) long
- Created: 15th century
- Present location: Bishop Museum, Honolulu
- Culture: Hawaiian

Līloa's kāʻei (transl. Līloa's sash) or kāʻei kapu o Līloa (transl. the sacred sash of Līloa) is the sacred feathered sash of Līloa, king of the Big Island of Hawaiʻi. The Statue of Kamehameha the Great, commissioned by King Kalākaua, displayed the kāʻei.

It is in the collection of the Bishop Museum in Honolulu.

== Description ==
This 14-foot (4.3 m) piece of ʻiʻiwi and ʻōʻō feathers (with some mamo) is extremely delicate. Based on examination of photographs reproduced in books, the kāʻei appears to be a base of olonā covered with a broad red center stripe running its entire length, occasionally crossed by bands of yellow featherwork. The edges appear to be primarily mamo, with some sections in ʻeʻe (the yellow feathers of the ʻōʻō). A row of human teeth hangs from the lower edge of a horizontal band of ʻeʻe. At the bottom edge, a section is decorated with alternating rows of human teeth and rosettes or clusters of small fish teeth. This section appears to be bordered with mamo feathers. Probably the sections were added at later and separate dates, the human teeth being those of people whose mana was wanted to increase that of the kāʻei.

== History ==
This kāʻei is believed to have been made for Līloa, the high chief of the island of Hawaiʻi. He reigned from about 1455 to 1485. His successor was his eldest son Hākau, but the kāʻei passed to his second son, ʻUmi-a-Līloa, born to a lower-ranking mother. The sash could have been the same one that Līloa had given to ʻUmi's mother for the future time when they would reunite; this story is similar to that of Theseus. Hākau was a despotic ruler and was overthrown by ʻUmi in 1490. Then, for three generations, there is no mention of the kāʻei.

In the mid to late 17th century, Līloa's great-great-great-granddaughter Keākealaniwahine, daughter of Keakamāhana, the highest-ranking chiefess of Hawaiʻi, possessed the kāʻei. She ceremonially dressed her grandsons, Kalaninuiamamao and Keʻeaumoku, in it – signifying that they were of the highest chiefly kapu (sacredness). Again, the kāʻei falls into obscurity, but records indicate that the kāʻei was handed down from Kamehameha the Great, to Kamehameha III, to Queen Kalama, to King Lunalilo. After Lunalilo's death, it was in the possession of Lunalilo's father, Charles Kanaʻina. After Kanaina's death, it was claimed by King Kalākaua. He bequeathed it to his sister Liliʻuokalani, who later gave it to the Bernice P. Bishop Museum, making this one of the oldest family heirlooms in Hawaiian history in existence.

== Dating ==
The validity of its age was proven in 2007 when researchers from the University of Kent were able to date feathers that had previously fallen out of this kāʻei but were being kept for conservation. The study carbon-dated the feathers from the kāʻei to a date range of 1406 to 1450 AD.

== Cultural significance ==
One reason for the obscurity of the kāʻei could be that they were so sacred. The few kāʻei mentioned in legend were closely guarded to prevent them from being viewed by the wrong people. For the unentitled to see, let alone touch, a kāʻei was death. Possibly one reason for the rarity and exceptional sacredness of the kāʻei is this unusually great mana. Even today, items of personal use are often considered kapu to their owner. In many hālau hula, it is forbidden to borrow someone else's instruments or costumes. So, to wear such a personal garment is to claim a direct link to the mana and fertility of the owner. In other words, to claim descent, either genealogical or spiritual. As mana could be dissipated and lost through careless use and dispersal, such a powerful garment would require great solicitude in its use and display.
