= Statues of Kamehameha I =

Coordinates: 21°18′20.6″N 157°51′34.8″W

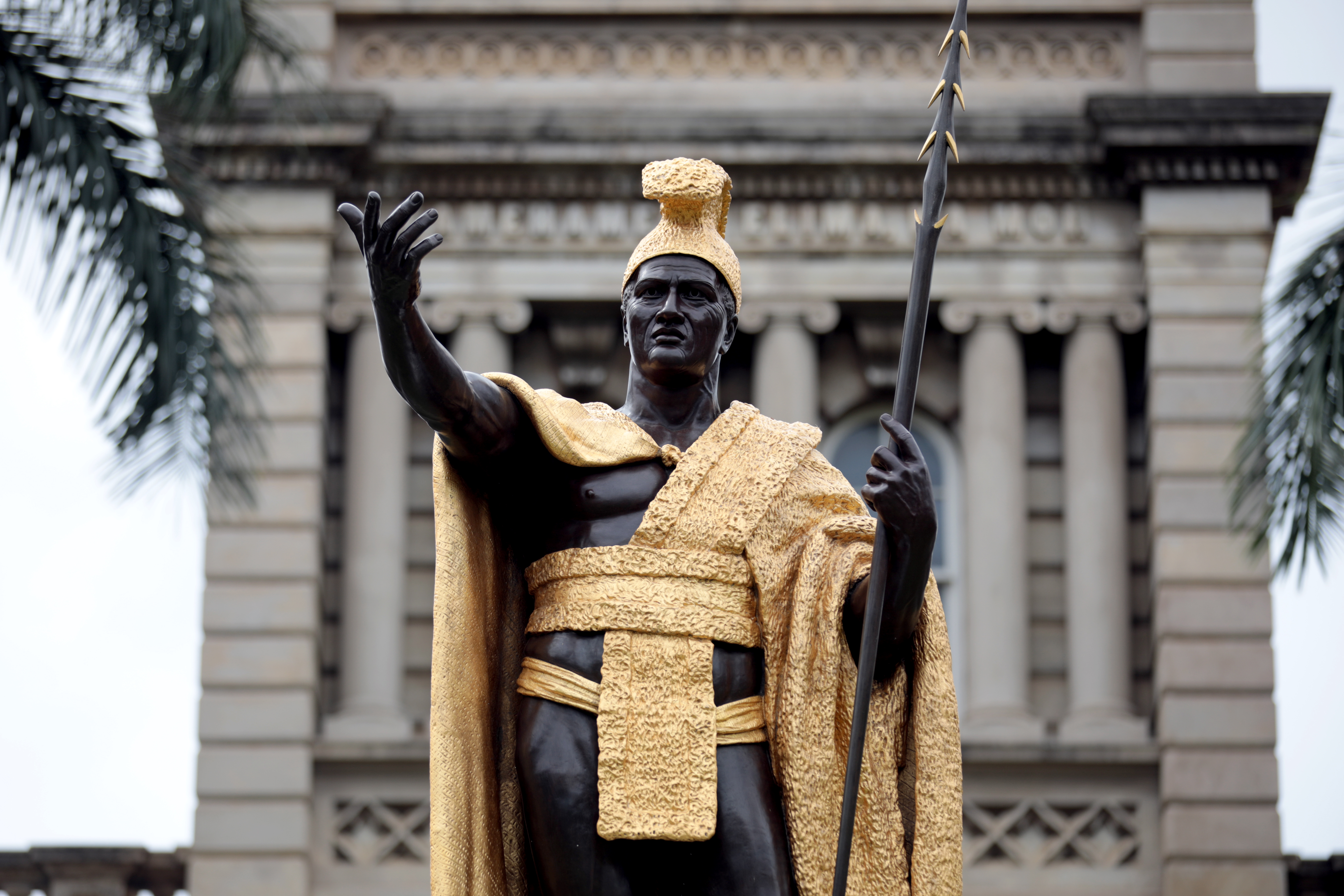
Kamehameha statue that stands today in front of Aliʻiolani Hale

Several Kamehameha statues honor the monarch who founded the Kingdom of Hawaii.

== Original work ==
The pictured statue stands prominently in front of Aliʻiolani Hale in Honolulu, Hawaii. The statue had its origins in 1878 when Walter M. Gibson, a member of the Hawaiian government at the time, wanted to commemorate the 100-year arrival of Captain Cook to the Hawaiian Islands. The legislature appropriated $10,000 for the project and made Gibson the director of the project, which originally included native Hawaiians but they soon were off the project and Gibson ran the project by himself. Gibson contacted Thomas R. Gould, a Boston sculptor living abroad in Florence, Italy to create the statue.

=== Features ===
Gould apparently relied mostly on a bust portrait of an elderly Kamehameha, an engraving of "Tamea-mea" that was a thirdhand copy printed in d'Urville's book (1834). But he was also requested to make the monarch appear as a 45-year-old, at the request of the monument committee. Gould was also provided photographs of Polynesians to assist in the visualization. But due to the fact that Gould was in Italy studying Roman sculpture, he adopted the stance of a Roman general with gesturing hand, spear, and cape are also Roman appropriations for the Hawaiian king. The belt or sash on the statue's waist is a symbolic rendering of the Sacred Sash of Liloa. In 1880, the initial sculpture was sent to Paris, France, to be cast in bronze. To assist Gould in his modeling, photographs of Robert Hoapili Baker (and John Tamatoa Baker, as in the surviving photo) dressed up in Hawaiian regalia (feather cloak, helmet and sash/baldric). (Note: Though the figure in the surviving photo is labeled as Robert in Kamehiro's book, this should be emended as John.)

During this time, David Kalākaua became king and was completing ʻIolani Palace which was his tribute to King Kamehameha I and to be the destination of the statue. The statue was too late for the 100th anniversary, but in 1880, the statue was placed aboard the German barque G. F. Haendel and headed for Hawaii. Near the Falkland Islands the ship wrecked and the statue was thought lost. However, the Hawaiians had insured the statue for $12,000 and a second casting was quickly made.

Before the second statue could be sent, the original was recovered by some Falkland Islanders. They sold it to Capt. Jervis of the EarlofDalhousi for $500, who brought it to Honolulu and sold it to Gibson for $875. The original with minor damages was repaired, and was relocated to the legendary king's birthplace at ʻĀinakea in Kohala on Hawaiʻi Island with the dedication ceremony taking place on May 8, 1883. The statue was moved a short distance in 1912 to its present location at the courthouse Kapaʻau.

=== Second statue in Honolulu ===
The re-ordered copy is the statue that now stands in front of the Aliʻiōlani Hale court building in Honolulu. It had arrived safely in Honolulu aboard the British ship Aberaman on July 31, 1883.

=== Third replica ===
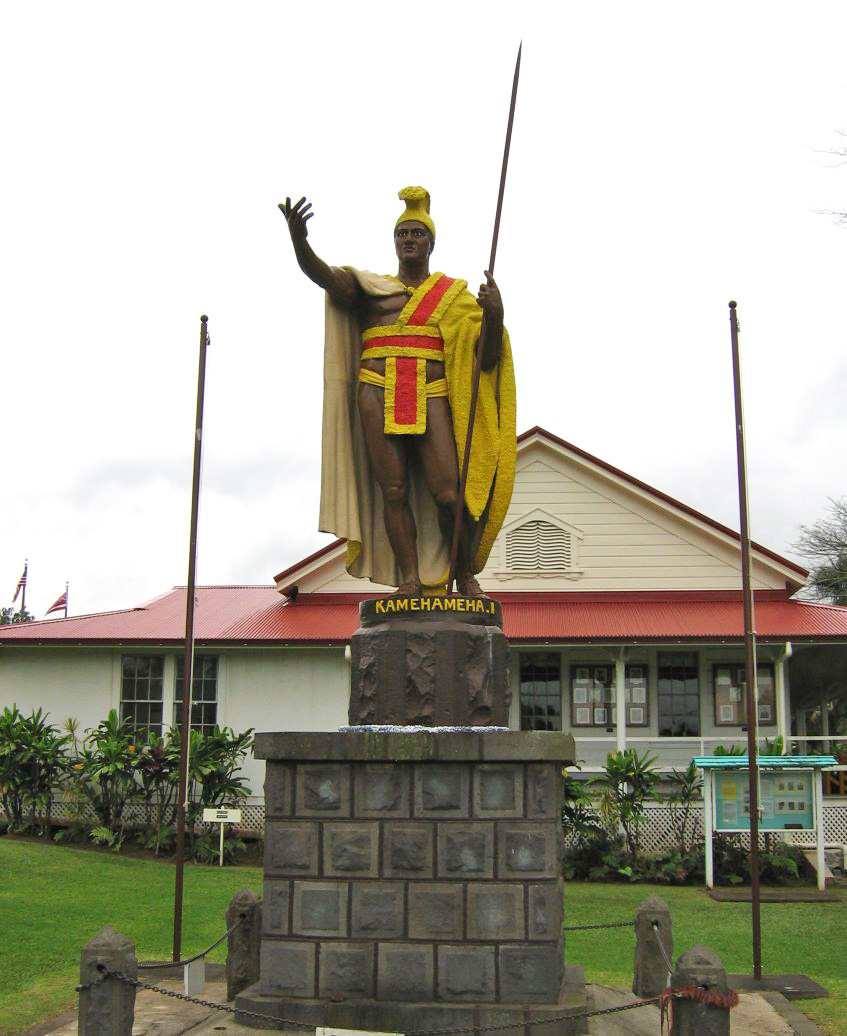
The first casting of the Gould statue, now at Kapaʻau, North Kohala

A third replica was commissioned when Hawaii attained statehood and was unveiled in 1969. It stood in the United States Capitol alongside the Father Damien Statue and was the heaviest statue in Statuary Hall, weighing 15,000 pounds. In 2008, shortly after Hawaii-born Barack Obama was nominated as the Democratic Party's candidate for the presidency, the statue was moved from a dark, back row of Statuary Hall to a prominent position in Emancipation Hall in the Capitol's new visitor center.

== Big Island ==
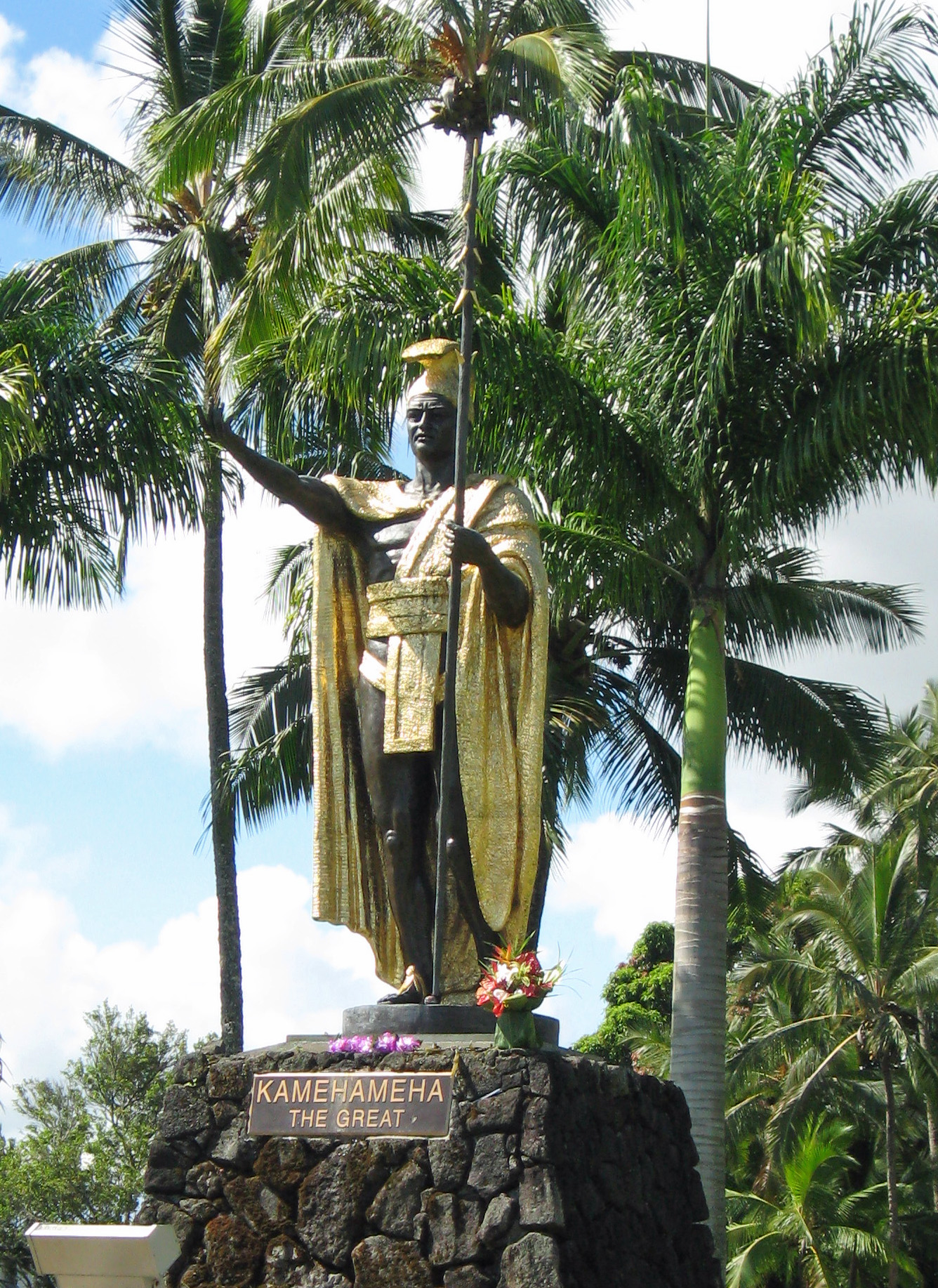
The statue in Hilo, Hawaii

Another Kamahameha statue resides on the island of Hawaiʻi (known locally as the Big Island). It is stands near downtown Hilo at the north end of the Wailoa River State Recreation Area, where it enjoys a king's view of Hilo Bay. The 14-foot (4.3 m) statue was sculpted by R. Sandrin at the Fracaro Foundry in Vicenza, Italy in 1963 but was not erected on this site and dedicated until June 1997. The statue was originally commissioned for $125,000 by the Princeville Corporation for their resort in Kauai. However, the people of Kauai did not want the statue erected there, as Kauai was never conquered by King Kamehameha I. Hilo, however, was one of the political centers of King Kamehameha I. Consequently, the Princeville Corporation donated the statue to the Big Island of Hawaii via the Kamehameha Schools Alumni Association, East Hawaii Chapter.

== Kane work ==
The Grand Wailea Resort Hotel & Spa on Maui is the home of a fifth Kamehameha statue. Hawaiian artist, author and historian Herb Kawainui Kane created the nine-and-a-half-foot work, which presides over the entrance of the hotel, facing the porte cochere. It is purported to be the most lifelike representation of the great warrior king.

== Las Vegas Statue ==
There was a sixth statue in Las Vegas, NV, along the Strip at the Hawaiian Marketplace. It was removed in January 2014 to make way for a Chili's. It was then moved to Springs Preserve where it became weathered by the harsh desert elements, deemed beyond repair, and disposed.

== Kamehameha Day ==
Every year on or near the June 11 Kamehameha Day holiday, Kamehameha statues are ceremoniously draped in fresh lei fashioned in Hawaiʻi. The event is celebrated in the United States Capitol with traditional hula performances.

== In popular culture ==
The Gould statue can be briefly seen in the opening credits of the original 1960s TV police drama Hawaii Five-O as well as the 2010 series reboot. The statue is also seen multiple times in a three-part series of Sanford and Son when the duo go on a vacation to Hawaii. The statue is seen on a pedestal outside the Hawaii Police Department Headquarters.

== Gallery ==
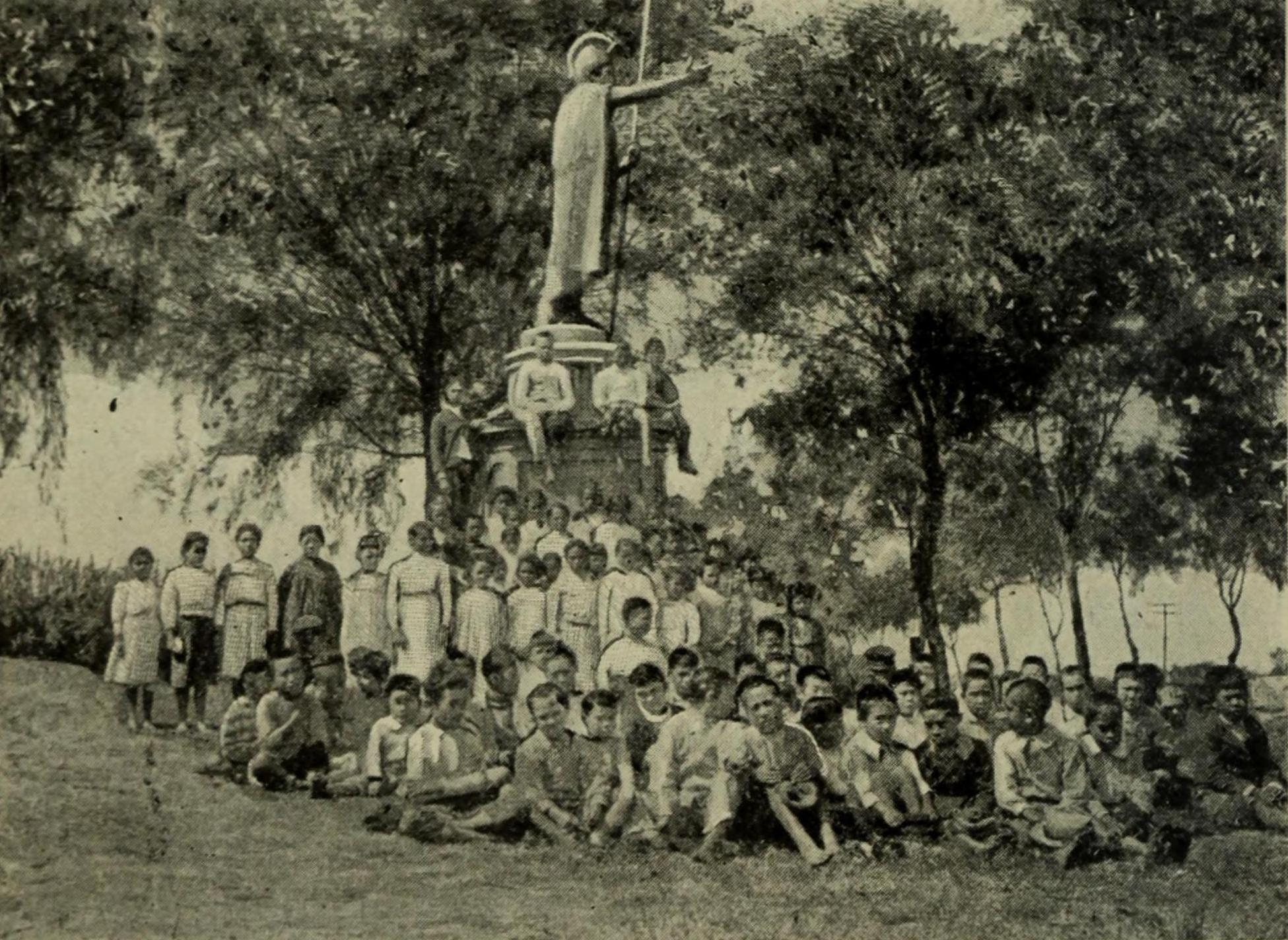
Kapaʻau statue with schoolchildren of plantation workers in 1900s

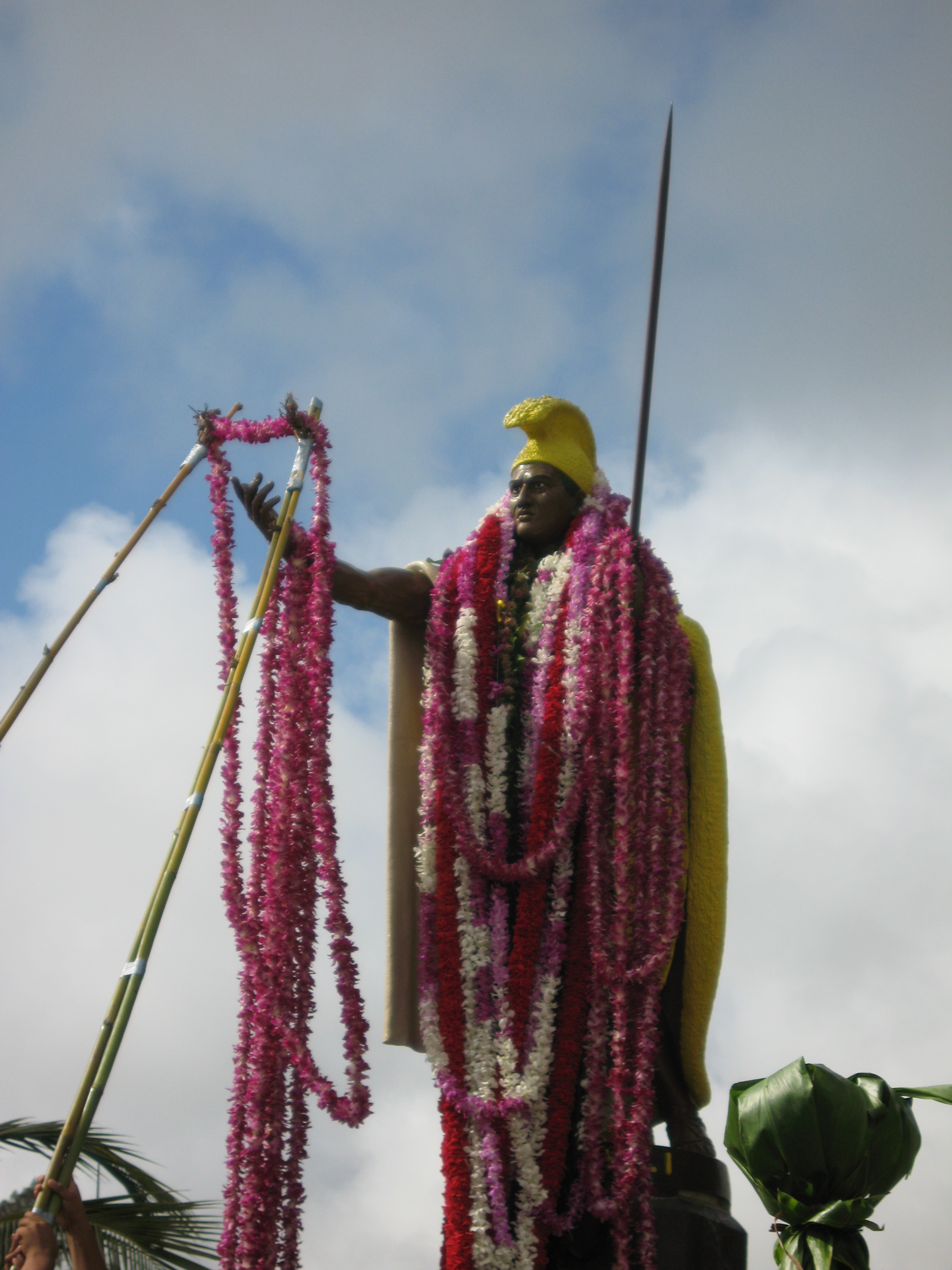
Kapaʻau statue festooned with orchid leis on Kamehameha day

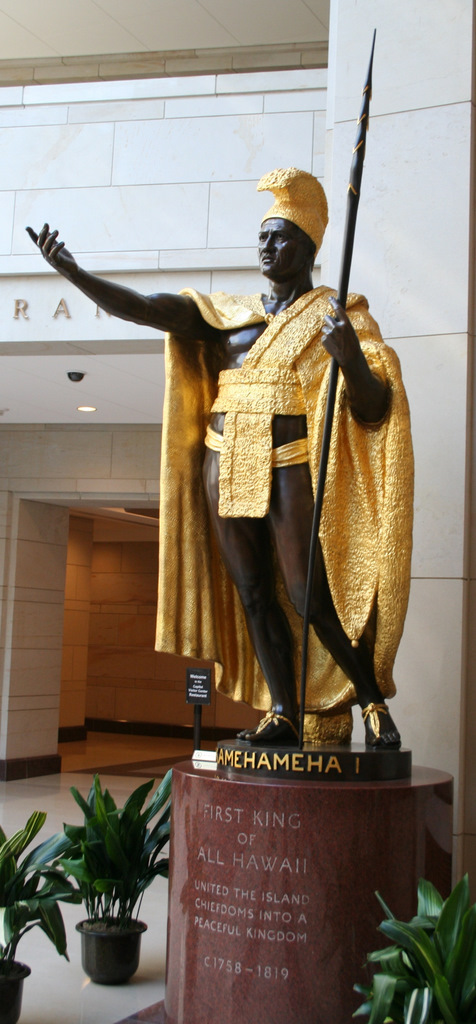
The replica in Emancipation Hall in the US Capitol Visitor Center

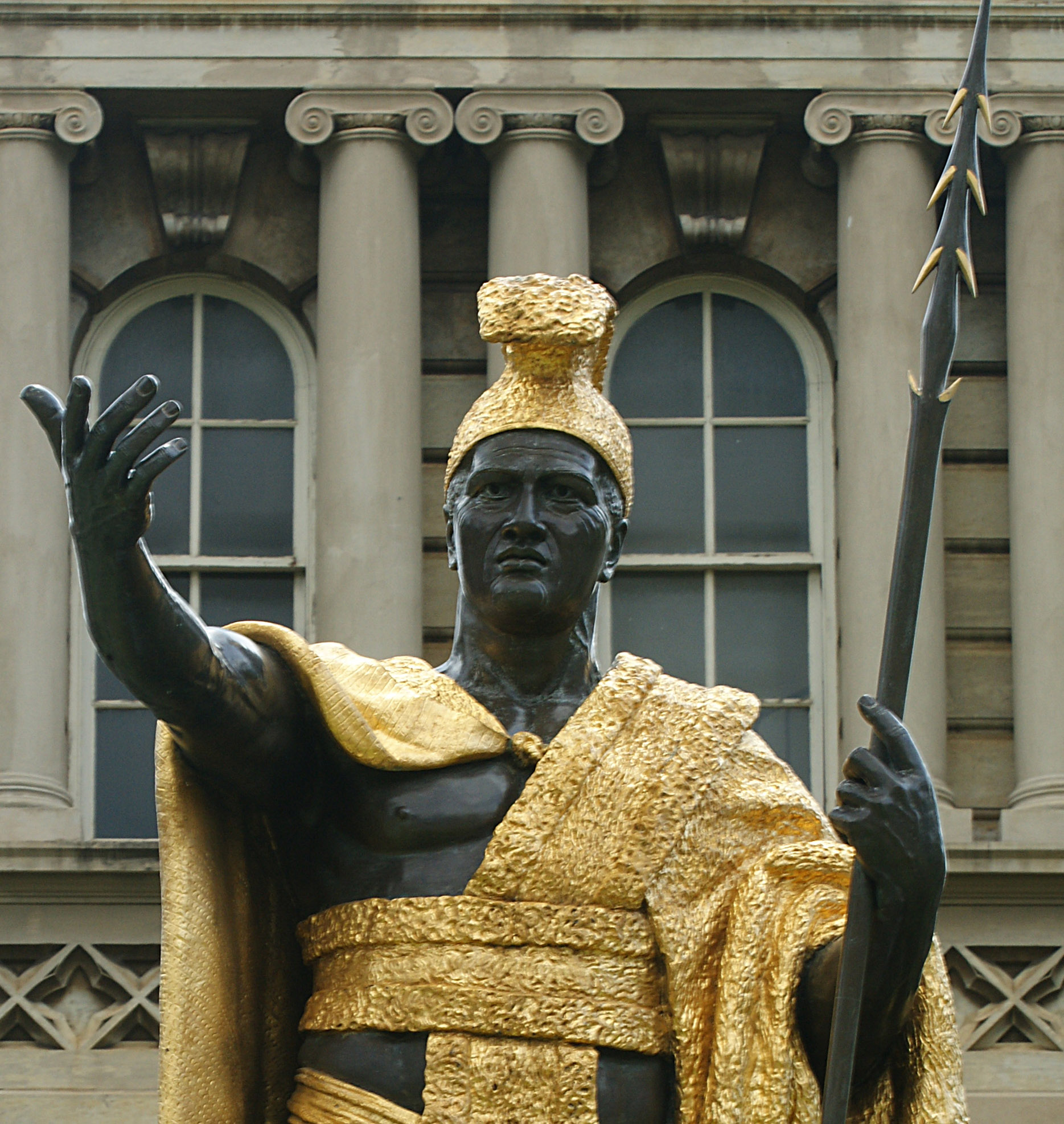
Closeup of Honolulu statue

== See also ==
- Kamehameha Statue (original cast)
- Kamehameha Statue (Honolulu cast)
