= Statue of Kamehameha I (Kapaau, Hawaii) =

Sculpture by Thomas Ridgeway Gould

Coordinates: 20°13′49″N 155°47′54″W

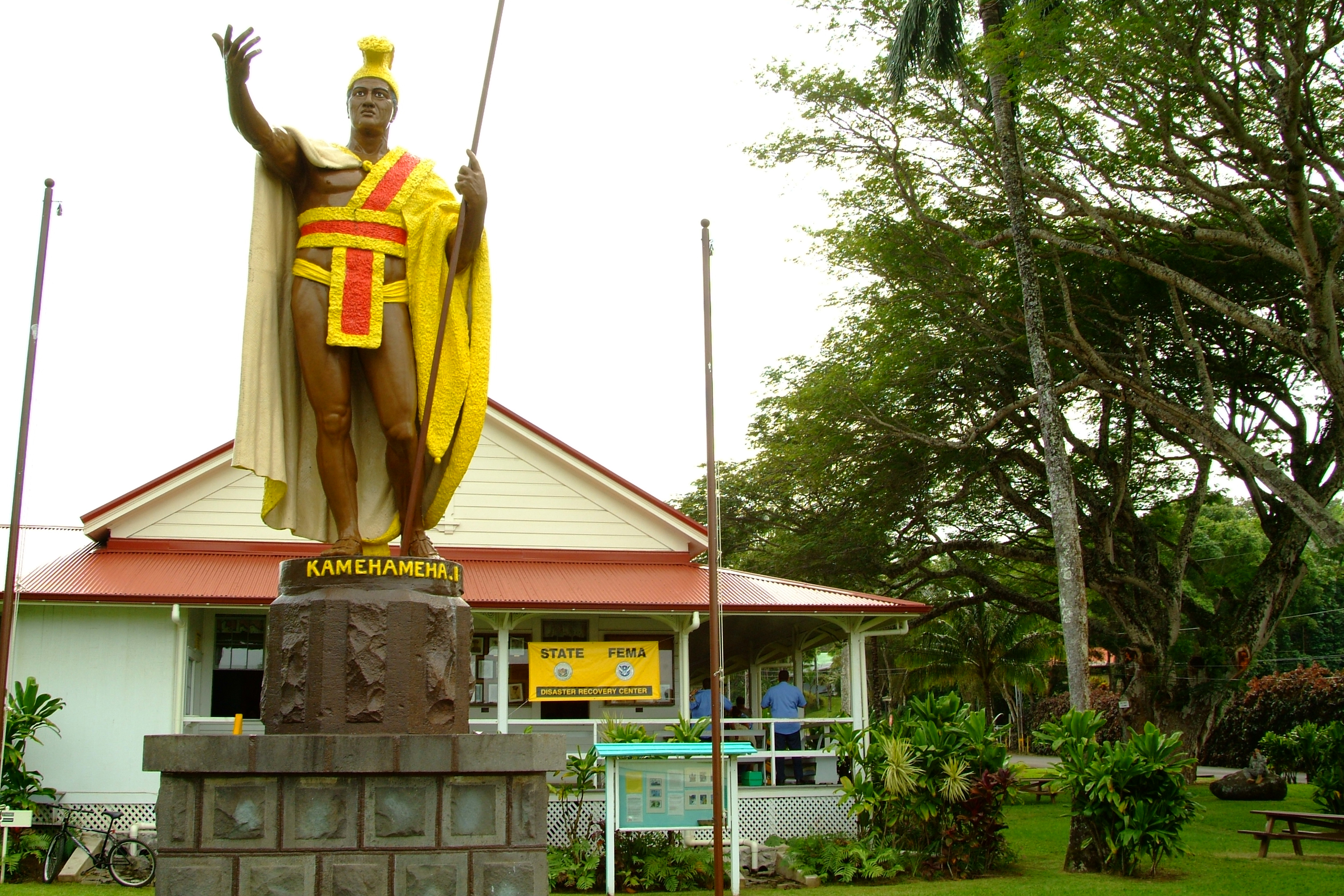
- Artist: Thomas Ridgeway Gould
- Completion date: 1880; 146 years ago (cast); 1883; 143 years ago (installed)
- Medium: cast brass and painted with lifelike colors
- Subject: Kamehameha I
- Location: Kapaʻau, Hawaii

The Kamehameha I statue (original cast) is an outdoor sculpture by American artist Thomas Ridgeway Gould, cast in 1880 and installed in 1883. It stands in front of the old country courthouse in the town of Kapaʻau, located in North Kohala on the Island of Hawaiʻi. Made of cast brass and painted with lifelike colors, it depicts Kamehameha I, and represents an important cultural and spiritual object for the local community.

== Description ==
The Kamehameha I sculpture is an oversized painted brass casting of King Kamehameha I, the ruler credited with unifying the Hawaiian Islands in the early nineteenth century and establishing the Kingdom of Hawaiʻi in 1810. Though the surface of the sculpture was originally finished with a brown chemical patina and gold leaf, it has become local tradition to paint the statue with lifelike colors, and it appears as such to this day. Originally commissioned to celebrate the centennial of Captain Cook's arrival to the Hawaiian Islands and to stand in front of the Aliʻiōlani Hale government building in Honolulu, extenuating circumstances during its delivery to Hawaiʻi delayed its arrival, and resulted in its being placed instead in Kapaʻau, near Kamehameha I's birthplace.

== Historical information ==
=== Commission and delivery to Hawaiʻi ===
The statue had its origins in 1878 when Walter M. Gibson, a member of the Hawaiian legislature at the time, decided to commission a sculpture to commemorate the 100 year arrival of Captain Cook to the Hawaiian Islands. The legislature appropriated $10,000 for the project and made Gibson chairman of the Commemorative Monument Committee formed to oversee the process. While the committee did include Native Hawaiians, it was strongly directed by Gibson and by King David Kalākaua. After searching several prominent U.S. cities for an appropriate artist, Gibson contracted Thomas Ridgeway Gould, a Boston sculptor living abroad in Florence, Italy, to create the statue.

By 1880, Gould finished the full-size plaster model for the work and sent it to the Barbedienne Foundry in Paris, France to be cast in brass. The finished brass sculpture was shipped (Note: On the German barque G. F. Haendel) from Bremen, Germany in August 1880 en route to Hawaiʻi, but after encountering a storm in the south Atlantic, a fire broke out on deck and the ship sank near the Falkland Islands. Its entire cargo, including the sculpture, was presumed lost. When news of the shipwreck reached Honolulu, officials decided to commission a second cast using the $12,000 insurance collected after the loss of the original. Ironically, and unbeknownst to Honolulu officials, fishermen managed to recover the sunken statue, which was recognized and bought by a British ship captain (Note: Capt. Jervis of the Earl of Dalhousi) who then sold it in 1882 to the Hawaiian government for $875. Now in possession of two identical statues, government officials decided to place the second cast, in considerably better condition than the original that had been damaged in the shipwreck, in the location originally intended to receive the statue, the Aliʻiōlani Hale government building in Honolulu. After some debate, the original was installed near Kamehameha I's birthplace in North Kohala. Due to the shipwreck, neither statue was on-hand in Hawaiʻi to fulfill Gibson's original plan of celebrating the 100th anniversary of Cook's arrival to the islands. However, Gibson was able to convince King Kalākaua to incorporate the unveiling of the Honolulu cast into his coronation ceremonies in February, 1883.

=== Features ===
During the initial stages of the statue's design, Gould and Gibson made efforts to create an accurate likeness of King Kamehameha's face, body, and clothing. This proved to be a challenging task, as there was no consensus on what exactly Kamehameha I looked like. When in Boston, Gibson provided Gould with an engraving of King Kamehameha, a French copy of a Chinese copy of the king's official watercolor portrait by Russian artist Louis Choris in 1816. Gibson directed Gould to use this copy of a copy of a copy, but to portray Kamehameha at approximately age forty-five, much younger than he appeared in the original watercolor. Attention was also focused on the proper way to depict Kamehameha's body; it was eventually determined that to convey his heroic and larger-than-life status, Kamehameha should be depicted with typical Herculean features, including a broad back and shoulders, strong, powerful arms, and a commanding chin.

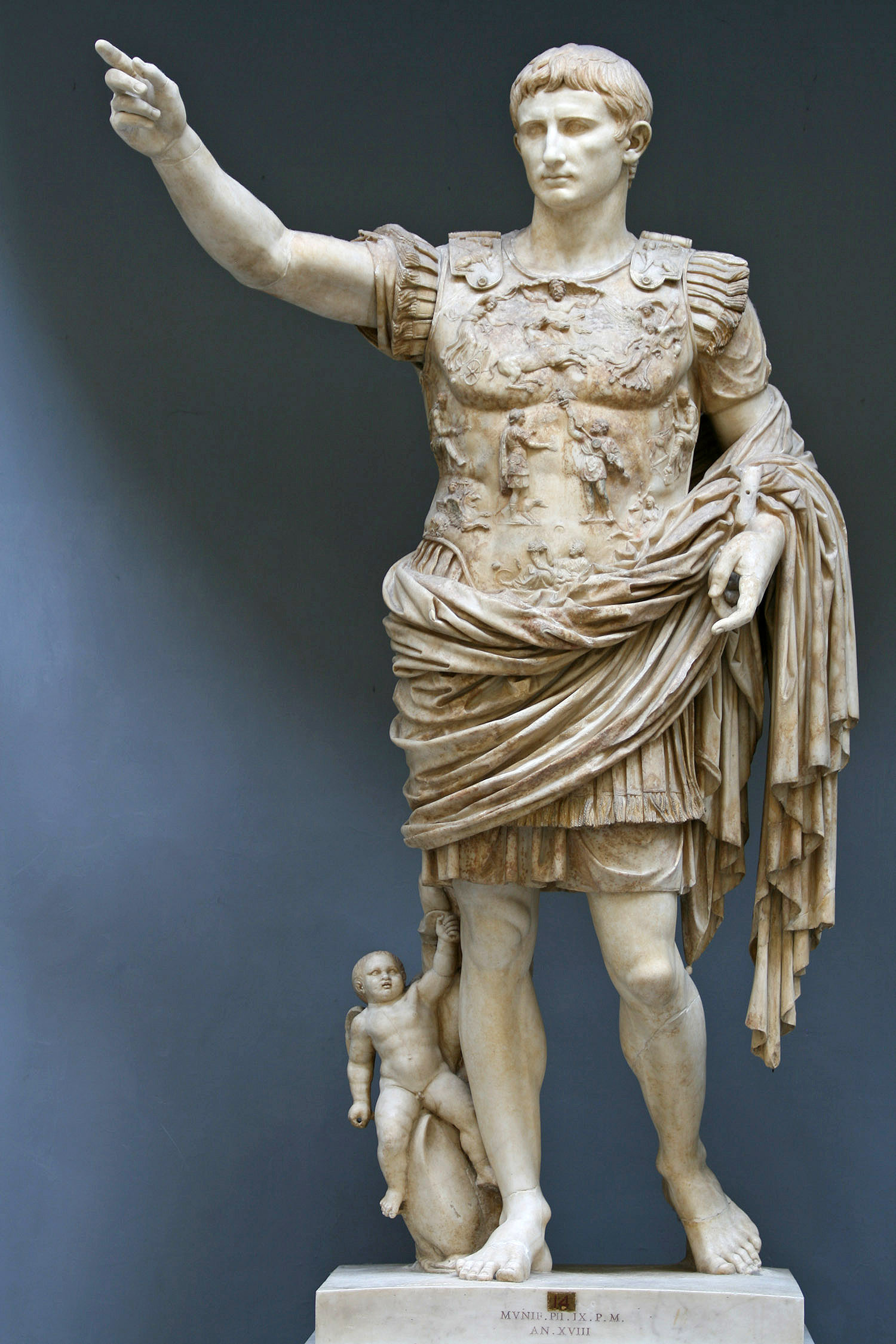
Augustus of Prima Porta

Some evidence exists to support the claim that Gould used the Roman sculpture of Augustus Caesar from Prima Porta (see Augustus of Prima Porta) as a model for Kamehameha the Great (original cast). The Augustus sculpture was well known throughout the United States and Europe at the time, and would most certainly have been known by Gould, whose neoclassical work was often inspired by Classical pieces. In addition, there are striking similarities between the Augustus of Prima Porta and Kamehameha the Great (original cast), including the raised right arm and the fact that Kamehameha holds his spear in his left hand like Augustus, even though Kamehameha was thought to have been right-handed. It has been argued that this fusion of Hawaiian cultural attributes with Roman heroic imagery was a deliberate attempt to portray Kamehameha I as a "Pacific Hero" and bolster the Hawaiian monarchy at a time of political and economic instability.

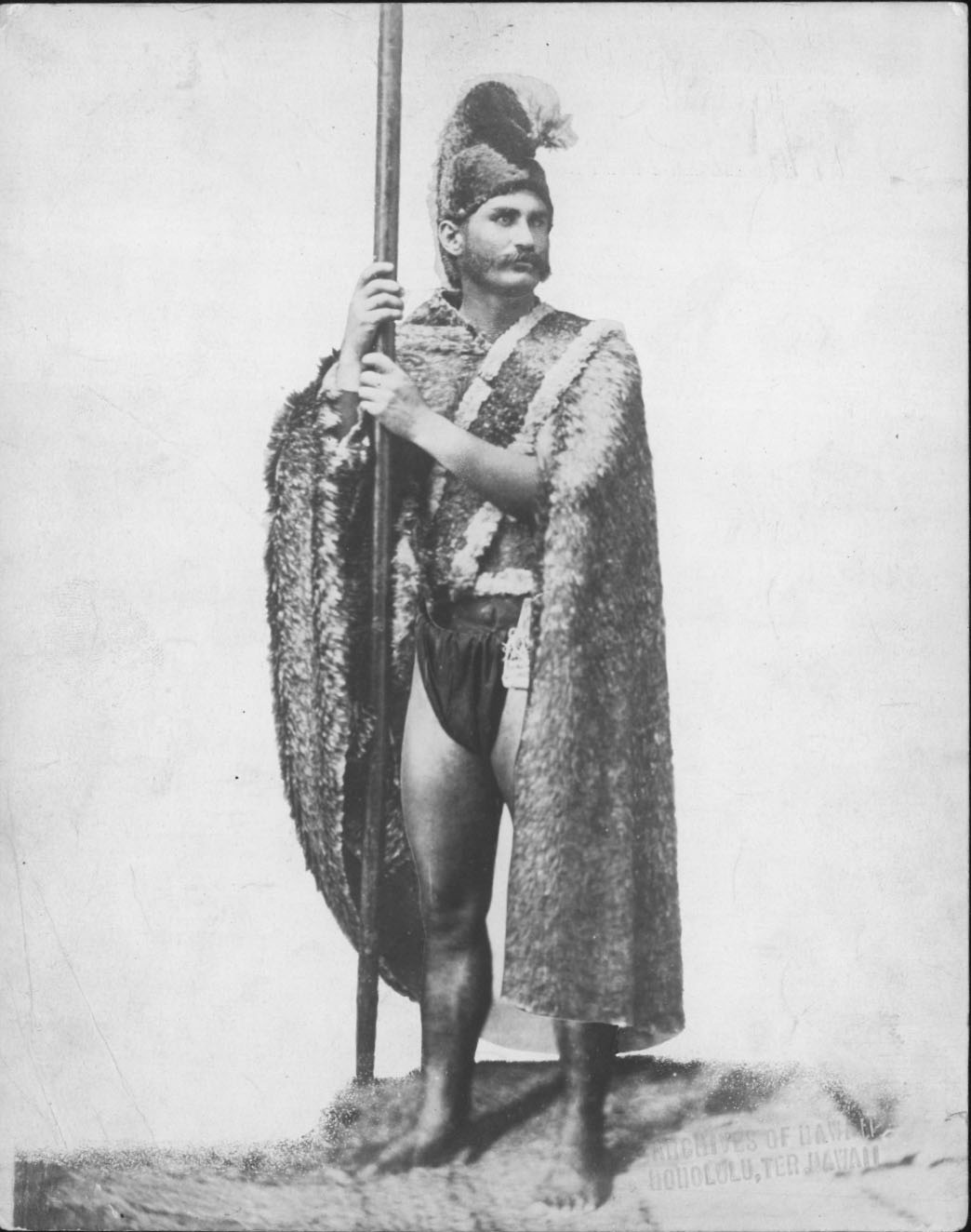
Photograph of John Tamatoa Baker, by Christian Hedemann, composite version

For use as reference for Gould, King Kalākaua commissioned a series of photographs of Hawaiians modeling King Kamehameha's. A man served as model dressed up in the royal feather cloak (ʻahu ʻula), feather helmet (mahiole), feather sash (kāʻei) (also referred to as a "(feather) malo" or "feather baldric"). (Note: A vintage photograph of a native man wearing the feather sash (properly) is held in the Bishop Museum collection, catalogued 126,642. He has the sash wrapped around the waist, then from behind over the shoulder, diagonally down against body, and tucked through at the front.) (Note: Not to be confused with the fact the model also woreflounced cotton malo, probably more in the manner of the usual loincloth. The sculptor was also furnished with photographs of a featherwork "malo of Kaumualiʻi" and those of an ordinary malo.)). Although the figure in the photograph had been identifiable as Robert Hoapili Baker, according to Gibson's writings, in the particular photo[s] which survived, the man is asserted to be his half-brother John Tamatoa Baker, since John's photos were mixed in the furnished photographs in all likelihood, and the one made to hold the spear is purported to have been John. There is also a photomontage version (see photo right), where the top half of John Baker in royal dress is composited with the legs of a native Hawaiian fisherman. (Note: Earlier Jean Charlot had conjectured the dressed man was John T. Baker, while the more athletic physique legs belonged to his brother Robert. and this assessment is repeated elsewhere.) The garments worn by the models, i.e. the sash(kāʻei), tied around the figure's waist and draped over his left shoulder, his feather helmet (mahiole), and his cloak (ʻahu ʻula), are now on display at the Bernice Pauahi Bishop Museum. (Note: Rose (1978) refers to "Lili'uokalani feather sash" accession number 1910.18.01 at the Bishop Museum (p. 24) or "girdle" (p. 27) but rewords name as feather baldric or malo (BPBM 1910.18.01) in Rose (1978), n5. Brigham (1918) also refers to the item as "feather malo", noting its acquisition from the Queen (Lili'uokalani) 1910 (pp. 32–33 and Fig. 31 "Kaumualiʻi's Malo", and discusses it in association with the "cordon" on the Kamehameha statue (pp. 37–38). Note these older sources make no mention of this sash being owned by King Līloa, as do recent literature (Wharton (2011), p. 28) or Kamehiro (2009), labeled "BPBM 1910.018.001").) The sash consists of a central band of tiny red feathers, likely from the ʻiʻiwi, the Hawaiian honeycreeper (Vestiaria coccinea), surrounded on either side by bands of yellow feathers from the ʻōʻō (Moho nobilis). The ʻahu ʻula is composed of nearly 450,000 golden feathers from the now-extinct mamo.

In order to deflect criticism from both American and Native Hawaiian opinion, Gould and Kalākaua made an effort to observe the many complex customs and ritualistic insignia needed to produce an accurate representation of a high-ranking Native Hawaiian chief. Still, some aspects of Kamehameha's depiction draw heavy criticism to this day. The main point of contention is the pair of sandals adorning Kamehameha's feet. While at the time, Hawaiians did wear sandals, it was only for traveling long distances or over heavy terrain, and the obviously Western Classical style of the shoes only compounds their inaccuracy. Additional problems include the fact that Kamehameha's sash drags on the ground behind him like a royal European train (an arrangement that would be considered degrading by Native Hawaiians and that would also damage the delicate feathers composing the sash), and Gould's decision to adorn the cloak with a European-style tassel. Although no early criticisms on the subject have been found, contemporary critics also take issue with Kamehameha's open-hand gesture, since traditional Hawaiian beckons are made with the palm down, not the palm up.

== Conservation history ==
Throughout its history, maintenance of the sculpture has proven to be challenging to carry out due to jurisdictional confusion—though the statue is located on county land, it is unclear if it belongs to the state or not, and therefore deciding who should be responsible for caring for it can be difficult to determine. Older residents of the island claim that during the plantation era, the sugar company bosses maintained the sculpture. Sometime after World War II, the County Department of Public Works in Hilo, Hawaii assumed responsibility for the statue's care; after government reorganization in 1973, the crew tasked with cleaning and repainting the sculpture was transferred to state control. Having little to no experience caring for public works of art, the crews often utilized materials and techniques that would be considered aggressive and potentially damaging by modern art conservators, including wire brushes, power washers, and house paint. When funds for this maintenance dried up in 1992, state crews stopped repainting the sculpture. Though the Art in Public Places Division of the Hawaii State Foundation on Culture and the Arts maintains most Hawaiian public art, including Kamehameha the Great (second cast), it does not allocate funds to care for the North Kohala cast. Local residents suspect this may be due to the agency's disapproval of painting the sculpture. Between 1992 and 2001, any repainting and general maintenance the statue received was from local volunteers working with common household materials.

In early 2001, Honolulu-contracted and the California-based conservator Glenn Wharton, who led an effort to conserve the statue. After helping to regild Kamehameha the Great (second cast) in 1994, Wharton visited the North Kohala statue in the spring of 1996 with the initial intent of determining and then restoring the statue to its original nineteenth-century appearance. Upon visiting the sculpture for the first time, Wharton discovered that the statue's current coat of paint had faded due to ultraviolet (UV) light from the Sun, was lifting in many areas, and in some places had flaked away completely to reveal underlying corrosion. Wharton later identified this as bronze disease, a detrimental form of corrosion that can occur on copper, brass, and bronze surfaces when exposed to chloride salts, water, and oxygen, and, when left untreated, can eat away into the surface of the metal. In addition, Wharton noted signs of corrosion of the interior iron armature (See armature (sculpture)), and stress cracks in the metal base, all issues which would need to be dealt with in the final treatment plan.

One of the most challenging aspects of the conservation of Kamehameha the Great (original cast) was determining the original appearance of the statue. Since conservators traditionally strive to uphold the artist's intent when caring for an artwork, figuring out this piece of information was of critical importance. While the Honolulu cast sported a patinated surface with gilt (See gilding) garments, the North Kohala cast had been painted in lifelike colors for as long as any local residents of the island could remember, and it wasn't clear whether the statue had been originally gilt or painted. Historical accounts provided little assistance to the investigation, as articles written on the sculpture at the time of its unveiling in the 1880s offered conflicting and often contradictory descriptions of the artwork. However, by analyzing paint chip samples taken from the statue's surface using X-ray fluorescence and X-ray diffraction, Wharton was eventually able to gather evidence of 24kt gold leaf residue beneath the layers of paint, effectively concluding that the statue had, like its Honolulu counterpart, an original patinated and gilded surface. Wharton theorized that because of damage caused by the shipwreck, the sculpture's surface had corroded badly before its eventual transport to Hawaiʻi in 1883, and due to lack of materials and technical expertise to regild and patinate the surface, the statue was instead cleaned and then painted entirely brown in order to prepare it in time for Kalākaua's coronation ceremony. At some point between 1883 and 1912, the tradition of painting the sculpture in multiple colors began.

Because of the complexity of the decision as well as the deep cultural connection many local residents felt to the statue, Wharton devised a novel scheme to allow the Hawaiian people to decide if the statue should remain painted with lifelike colors or be restored to its original gilded appearance. An effort was made to interest young children and local students in the sculpture, in order to get adults talking about the Kamehameha the Great as a conservation object. Teachers coordinated art projects centering on the sculpture, and local community groups also got involved, making crafts and conducting research projects to increase awareness of the sculpture and the efforts to restore it. Journalists reported on the ongoing projects in the local newspapers, sometimes offering their own opinions on whether the statue should be painted or gilt. Debate centered on whether it was best to restore the statue's gilded surface, which would uphold the artist's original intent and, some argued, make the statue more aesthetically appealing, or to repaint, which would honor a local tradition and increase the statue's lifelike appearance. Eventually, after listening to the input of the kūpuna (community elders), who spoke out in favor of painting the sculpture, a local ballot was held in late 2000. The results were 71% in favor of repainting.

Hands-on work began on the sculpture in February 2001. After documenting the statue's initial condition, the paint was stripped away using a combination of pressure washers, propane torching, and solvent application. Once the brass surface had been cleaned, Wharton assessed the various stress cracks and gouges in the metal and determined that the damage was all relatively old, probably dating back to the shipwreck and its recovery from the sea. In addition, much of the bronze disease once visible on the surface of the sculpture had been blasted away during the paint stripping process. After it was determined that the statue was in stable condition, any holes or gaps in the metal were filled in using a pH-neutral epoxy putty, and the brass surface was misted with a benzotriazole solution in order to prevent future corrosion. To repaint the sculpture, Wharton selected a hearty paint system that could withstand the harsh Hawaiian sun and rain, which consisted of an automotive epoxy primer (See primer (paint)), a polyurethane paint, and a polyurethane clear top coat. Special care was taken to choose the proper colors for Kamehameha's skin tone and red and yellow feathered garments. Once the treatment was complete, Wharton helped train a group of local volunteers to carry out annual maintenance on the sculpture, and to watch for and record any condition changes or damage.

== Spiritual and cultural significance ==
Since its unveiling in 1883, Kamehameha the Great has come to be regarded by Hawaiians as an important cultural, economic, and spiritual object. Despite its Western origins, influences and artist, and despite the fact that the statue was not considered a spiritual object at the time of its creation, some Hawaiians consider the statue a receptacle of mana, a term that translates to "supernatural or divine power," and associations have been drawn between it and kiʻi ('image[s]'), figurative sculptures created by Native Hawaiians prior to Cook's arrival to the Islands. While scholars debate the exact functions of these sculptures, Hawaiian oral traditions describe that kiʻi could represent various entities, including akua (spirits, divinities) and manifestations of natural phenomena, and could serve as āumaka sculptures (family or personal gods, deified ancestors). It was believed that through various prayers and ho'okupu (offerings), the mana held within these figures increased. For some Hawaiians, any image of Kamehameha is considered a very strong kiʻi, even a Western facsimile such as Kamehameha the Great (original cast), and it is common to find offerings of food, ribbons, and pōhaku left as tribute upon the sculpture's pedestal. Even Hawaiians who do not believe the statue contains mana still venerate the statue as a representation of the spirit of Kamehameha I, and regard it as a connection to their ancestral history.

One of the statue's most important cultural functions is its role in the annual celebration of Kamehameha Day, a two-day festival starting on June 11 in which much of the Hawaiian population participates. Activities include hula, chanting, singing, and telling stories about Kamehameha and the significance of the holiday. Various cultural groups, including representatives of each island, travel to the sculpture to present and drape it with long lei (See lei (garland).) In addition, a parade takes place during the festival, beginning in Hāwī (See Hawi, Hawaii) and ending at a location just past the sculpture in Kapaʻau. Those participating often stop at the sculpture to bestow offerings before moving on.

Kamehameha the Great (original cast) has also become an important political symbol for the Hawaiian Islands. It is featured on the official Hawaiian state seal (See Seal of Hawaii), and in the logo of the Kamehameha Schools, which has campuses located throughout the Islands. In 1959, a replica of the statue was cast and placed inside the United States Capitol as part of the National Statuary Hall Collection to honor Hawaiʻi becoming the fiftieth state. Various businesses, especially those working in the tourist trade, have capitalized on the resulting popularity of the sculpture; its image has been used to decorate brochures, postcards, T-shirts, folk-art, etc., and small reproductions of the sculpture are popular souvenirs in many shops.
