= King Kamehameha Day =

Public holiday in Hawaii on June 11

King Kamehameha I Day
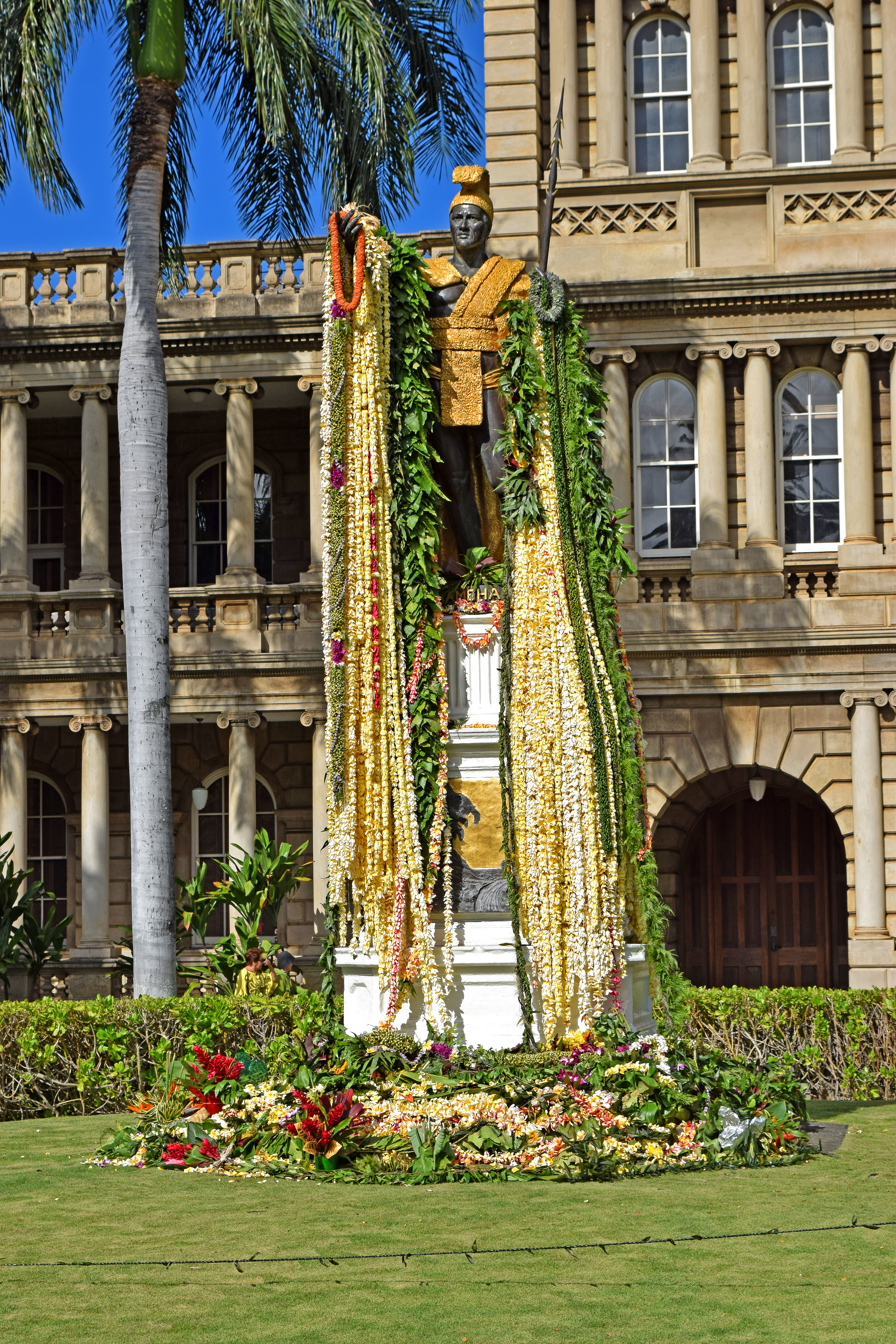
- Considered a great statesman for his mastery of diplomacy, Kamehameha I was known as the Napoleon of the Pacific.
- Observed by: Hawaii
- Significance: Unification of Hawaii by Kamehameha I
- Celebrations: Draping ceremony, Paʻu Parade, a Hoʻolauleʻa, carnivals, fairs, and competitions
- Observances: vacation: State and city workers, Schools
- Date: June 11
- Next time: June 11, 2027
- Frequency: Annual

King Kamehameha Day on June 11 is a public holiday in the U.S. state of Hawaii. It honors Kamehameha the Great (Kamehameha I), the monarch who first established the unified Kingdom of Hawaiʻi—comprising the Hawaiian Islands of Niʻihau, Kauaʻi, Oʻahu, Molokaʻi, Lānaʻi, Kahoʻolawe, Maui, and Hawaiʻi. In 1883 a statue of King Kamehameha was dedicated in Honolulu by King David Kalākaua (this was a duplicate, because the original statue was temporarily lost at sea but was recovered and is now located in North Kohala, island of Hawaiʻi). There are duplicates of this statue in Emancipation Hall at the Capitol Visitor Center in Washington, D.C., and in Hilo, island of Hawaiʻi.

== Establishment ==
King Kamehameha Day, June 11, was first proclaimed by Kamehameha V (on December 22, 1871) as a day to honor his grandfather, Kamehameha I. It was almost meant as a replacement for Hawaiian Sovereignty Restoration Day (on July 31) which the king and ministers disliked due to its association with the Paulet Affair.

The first observance of the holiday happened the following year. Late 19th century celebrations of Kamehameha Day featured carnivals and fairs, foot races, horse races and velocipede races. Kamehameha Day was one of the first holidays proclaimed by the Governor of Hawaiʻi and the Hawaiʻi State Legislature when Hawaiʻi achieved statehood in 1959.

In contemporary Hawai'i, Kamehameha Day is treated with elaborate events harkening back to ancient Hawaiʻi, respecting the cultural traditions that Kamehameha defended as his society was slowly shifting towards European trends. The King Kamehameha Hula Competition attracts hula groups from all over the world to the Neil S. Blaisdell Center for the two-day event. Prizes are awarded on the second night.

== Floral parade ==
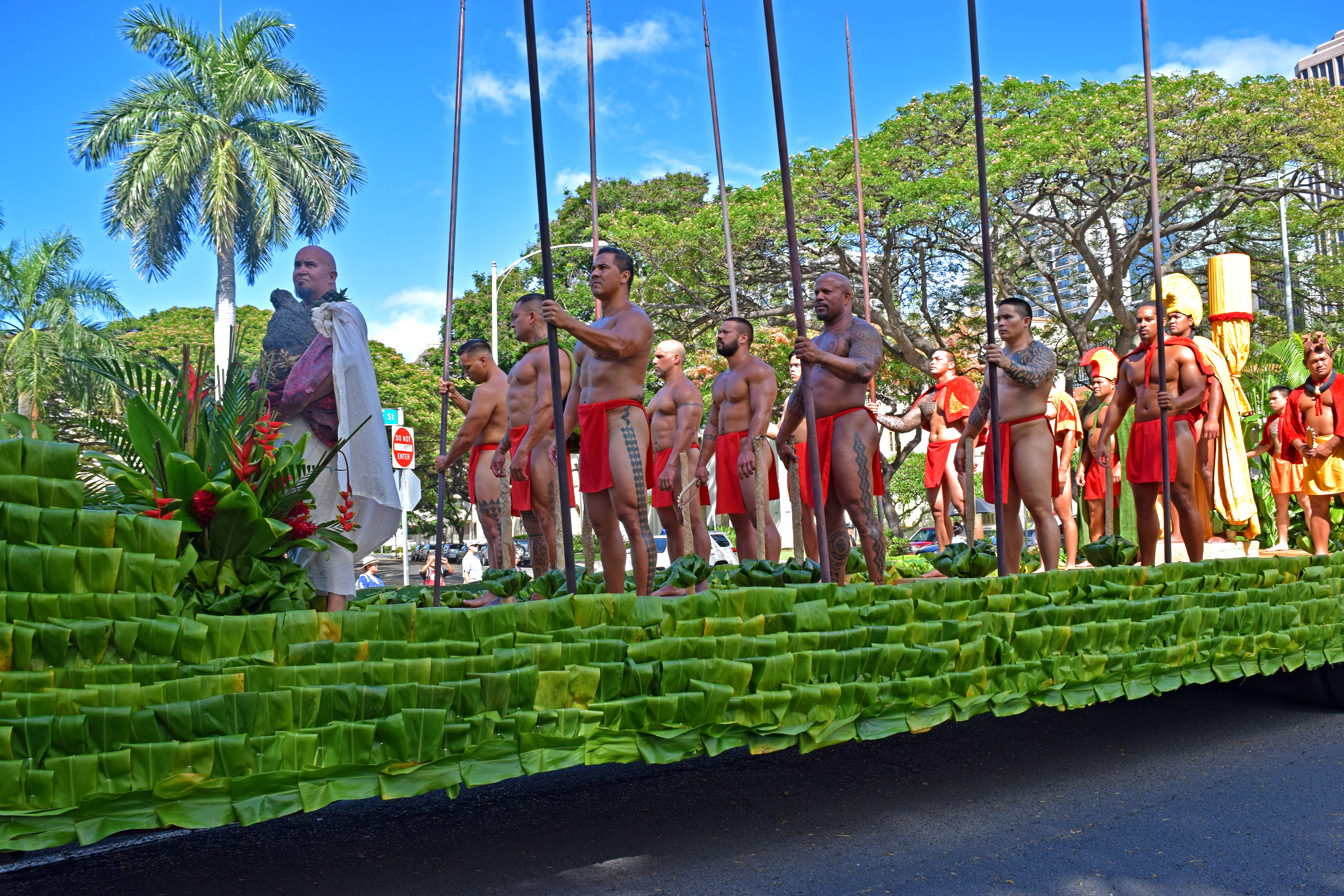
King Kamehameha I Day Floral Parade – Kamehameha float, June 11, 2016

A floral parade is held annually at various locations throughout the state of Hawaii. On the island of Oahu, the parade runs from ʻIolani Palace in downtown Honolulu past Honolulu Harbor and the Prince Kūhiō Federal Building through Kakaʻako, Ala Moana and Waikīkī, ending at Kapiʻolani Park. June 11 is also the anniversary of the dedication of Kapiʻolani Park. The floral parade features local marching bands—including the Royal Hawaiian Band (the oldest municipal band in the United States)—and artistically designed floats using native flowers and plants. Many local companies enter floats for their employees.

A favorite floral parade feature is the traditional royal paʻu riders. They represent a royal court led by a queen on horseback, followed by princesses representing the eight major islands of Hawaiʻi and Molokini. Each princess is attended by paʻu ladies in waiting. Paʻu women are dressed in colorful and elegant 19th century riding gowns accented with lei and other floral arrangements.

After the parade, the state celebrates a Hoʻolauleʻa, literally celebration, or block party with food and music. Cultural exhibitions are also scattered throughout Kapiʻolani Park—arts and crafts, games, sports, and other events planned by the Bishop Museum, the premier Hawaiian cultural institution.

On the Island of Hawaii, there are three floral parades held. One between the towns of Hawi and Kapaʻau and one in the town of Hilo. There is a King Kamehameha Day Celebration Parade and Hoʻolauleʻa in Kailua Kona on Aliʻi Drive each year. There is also a lei draping ceremony in Kapaau at the statue of King Kamehameha there.

== Draping ceremony ==
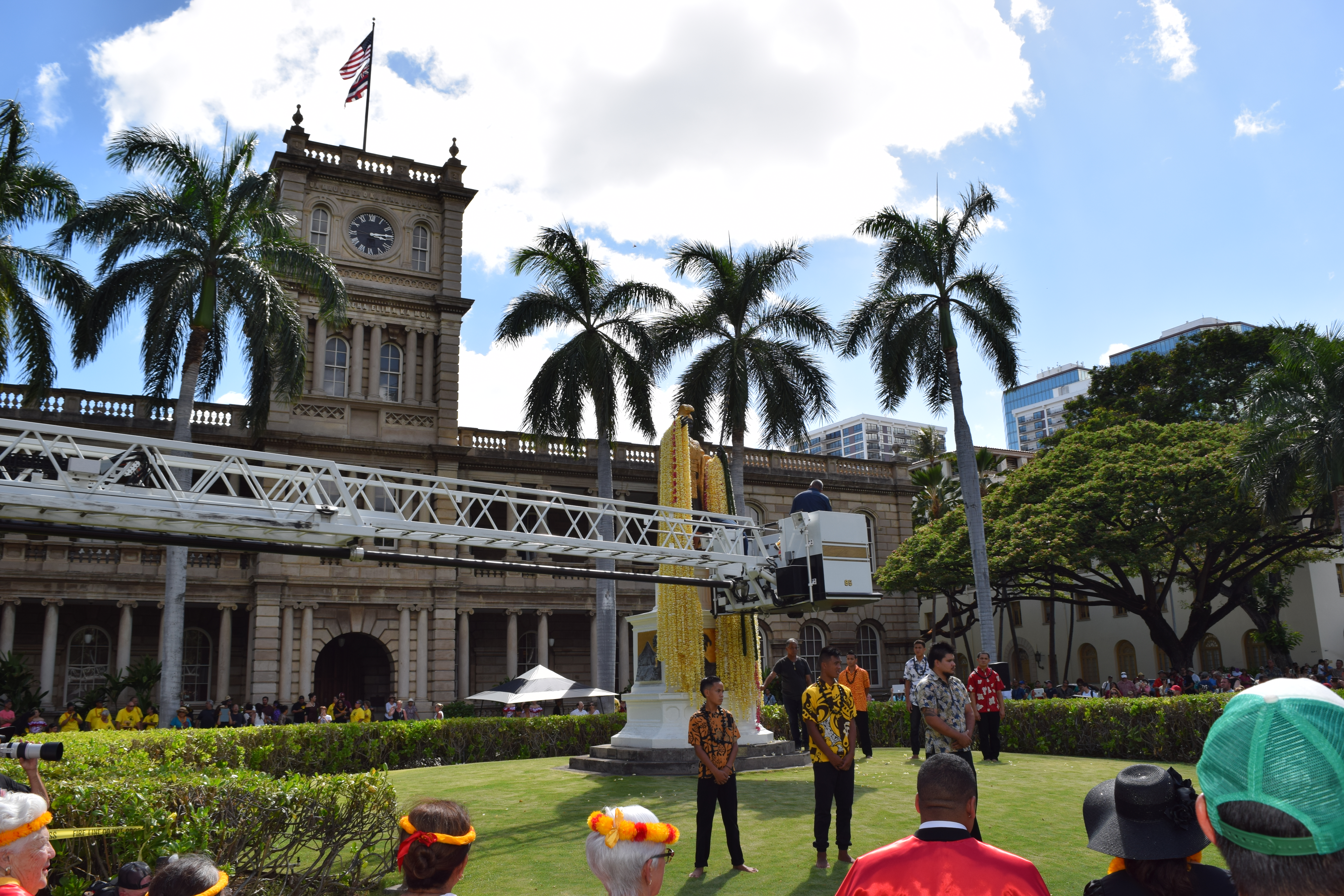
Lei Draping ceremony of June, 2016

The most important ritual of the celebration dates back to 1901 after the Territory of Hawaiʻi was established. It is the afternoon draping ceremony in which the Kamehameha Statue in front of Aliʻiolani Hale and ʻIolani Palace on King Street in downtown Honolulu is draped in long strands of lei. The same is done at the Kamehameha Statue on the former monarch's home island, the Big Island of Hawaiʻi. Outside of the state, a similar draping ceremony is held at the United States Capitol where the Kamehameha Statue there is also draped in lei in the company of federal officials.

== Celebration ==
The celebration includes a traditional Pa‘u Parade and a Ho‘olaule‘a. The celebrations are organized by the King Kamehameha Celebration Commission and other community organizations.
