= Thomas Ridgeway Gould =

American sculptor

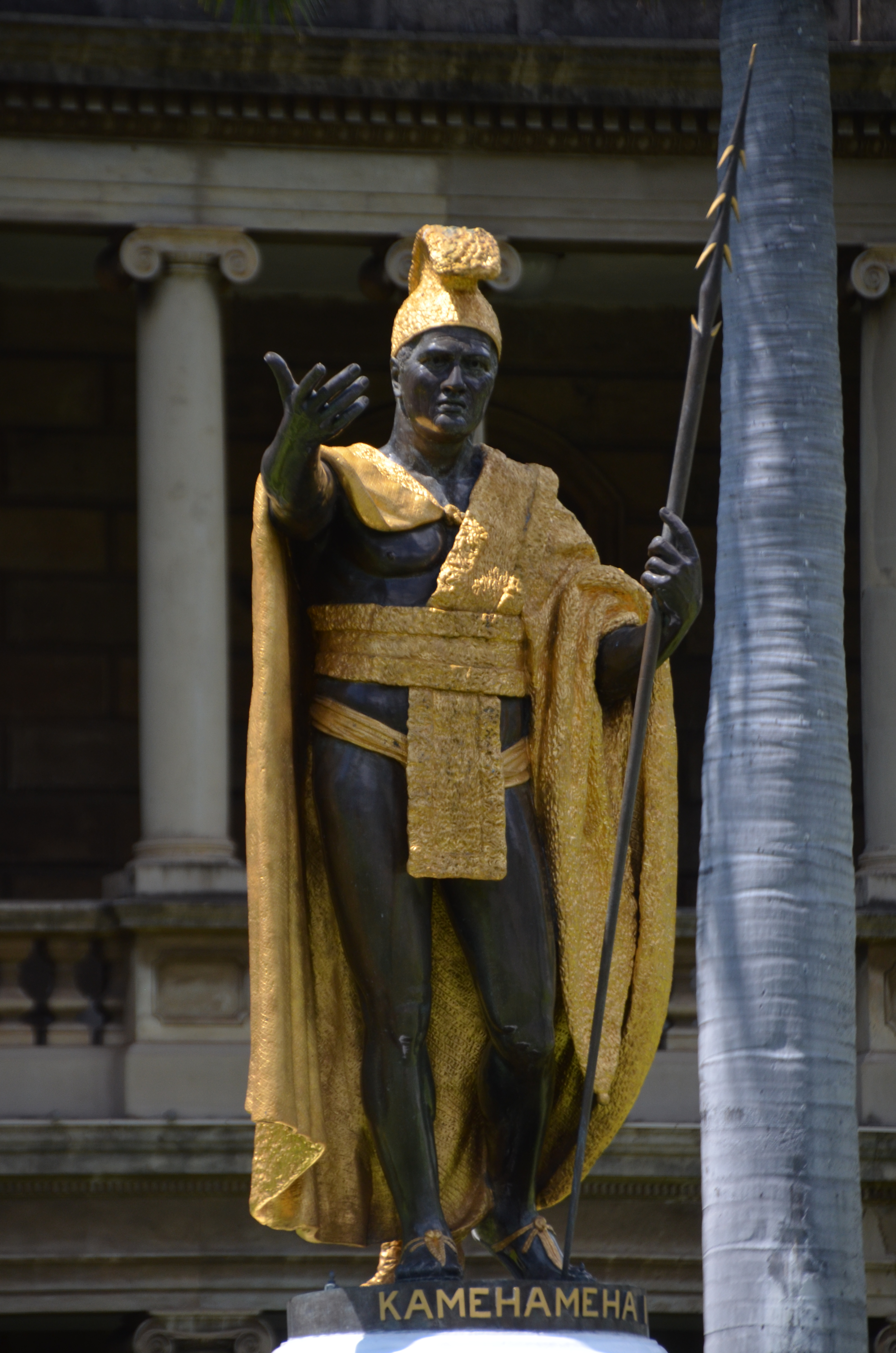
Kamehameha I statue in bronze and gold leaf (1881) located in Honolulu, Hawaii

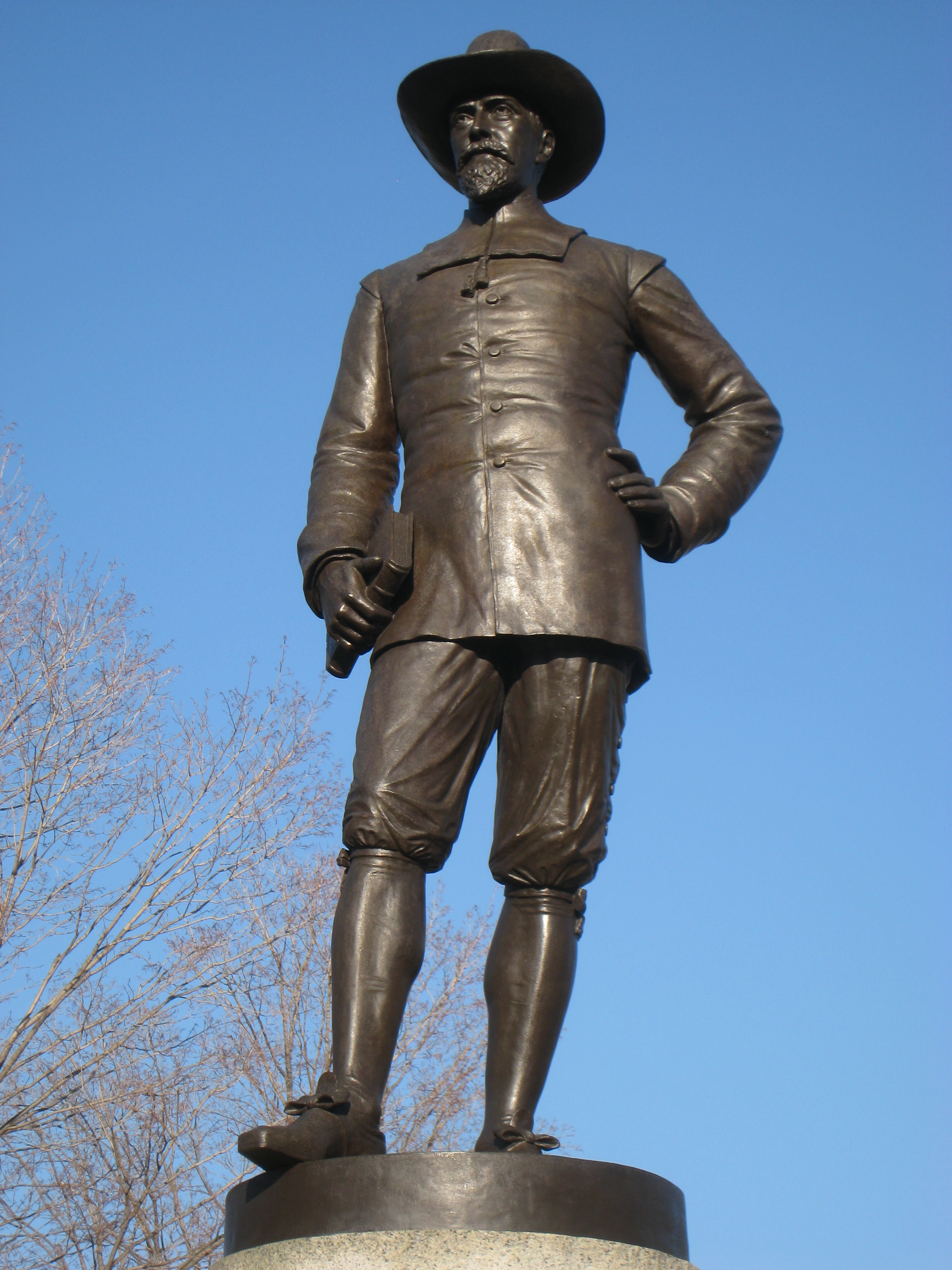
John Bridge, Cambridge

Thomas Ridgeway Gould (November 5, 1818 – November 26, 1881) was an American neoclassical sculptor active in Boston and Florence.

== Biography ==
Gould was born in Boston on November 5, 1818. He was at first a merchant with his brother in the dry-goods business, but studied sculpture under Seth Wells Cheney starting in 1851 and in 1863 exhibited two large heads of Christ and Satan at the Boston Athenæum. As a result of the American Civil War, he lost his moderate fortune, and in 1868 moved with his family to Florence, Italy, where he devoted himself to study and work.

His West Wind, originally sculpted in 1870, stirred controversy in 1874 when it was denounced as a copy of Canova's Hebe, with the exception of the drapery, which was modelled by Signor Mazzoli. Animated newspaper correspondence followed this charge, and it was proved groundless. Gould declared that his designs were entirely his own, and that not a statue, bust, or medallion was allowed to leave his studio until finished in all points on which depended their character and expression.

West Wind was later shown in the Philadelphia Centennial Exposition in 1876, and all told Gould subsequently made seven copies in two sizes. He also created statues of Kamehameha the Great, Cleopatra, Timon of Athens, Ariel, and John Hancock (now in the town hall of Lexington, Massachusetts).

Gould visited Boston in 1878, where he executed a number of portrait busts, including those of Emerson (now in the Harvard University library), John Albion Andrew, Seth Wells Cheney, and Junius Brutus Booth. Two alti-rilievi representing Steam and Electricity, displayed within the Boston Herald building, were among his last works. His statue of John Bridge, now on the Cambridge, Massachusetts commons, was completed by his son. Gould died in Florence, Italy on November 26, 1881. His body was returned to Forest Hills Cemetery for burial in the family plot, where it is commemorated with one of his own creations, Ascending Spirit.

== Works ==
He produced portrait busts of Emerson, John A. Andrew, and Junius Brutus Booth.

- Christ (a bust)
- Satan (a bust)
- Kamehameha the Great in Honolulu and in Kapaau, Hawaii
- West Wind, St. Louis Mercantile Library, St. Louis; Memorial Art Gallery of the University of Rochester, Rochester, New York; Orlando Museum of Art
- The Ghost in Hamlet, 1877, Memorial Art Gallery of the University of Rochester, Rochester, New York
- John Hancock (Lexington town hall)
- John Bridge, Cambridge Common (Mass.), completed by his son

== Gallery ==
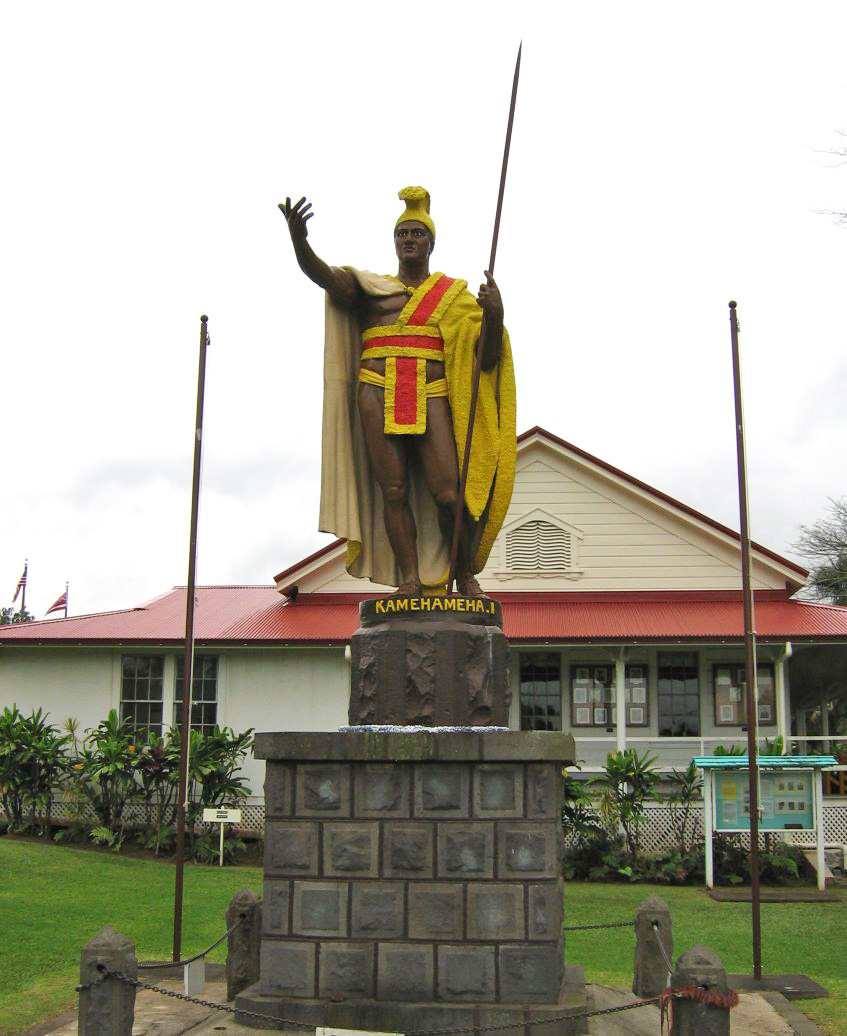
The original Kamehameha statue, at Kapaʻau, North Kohala

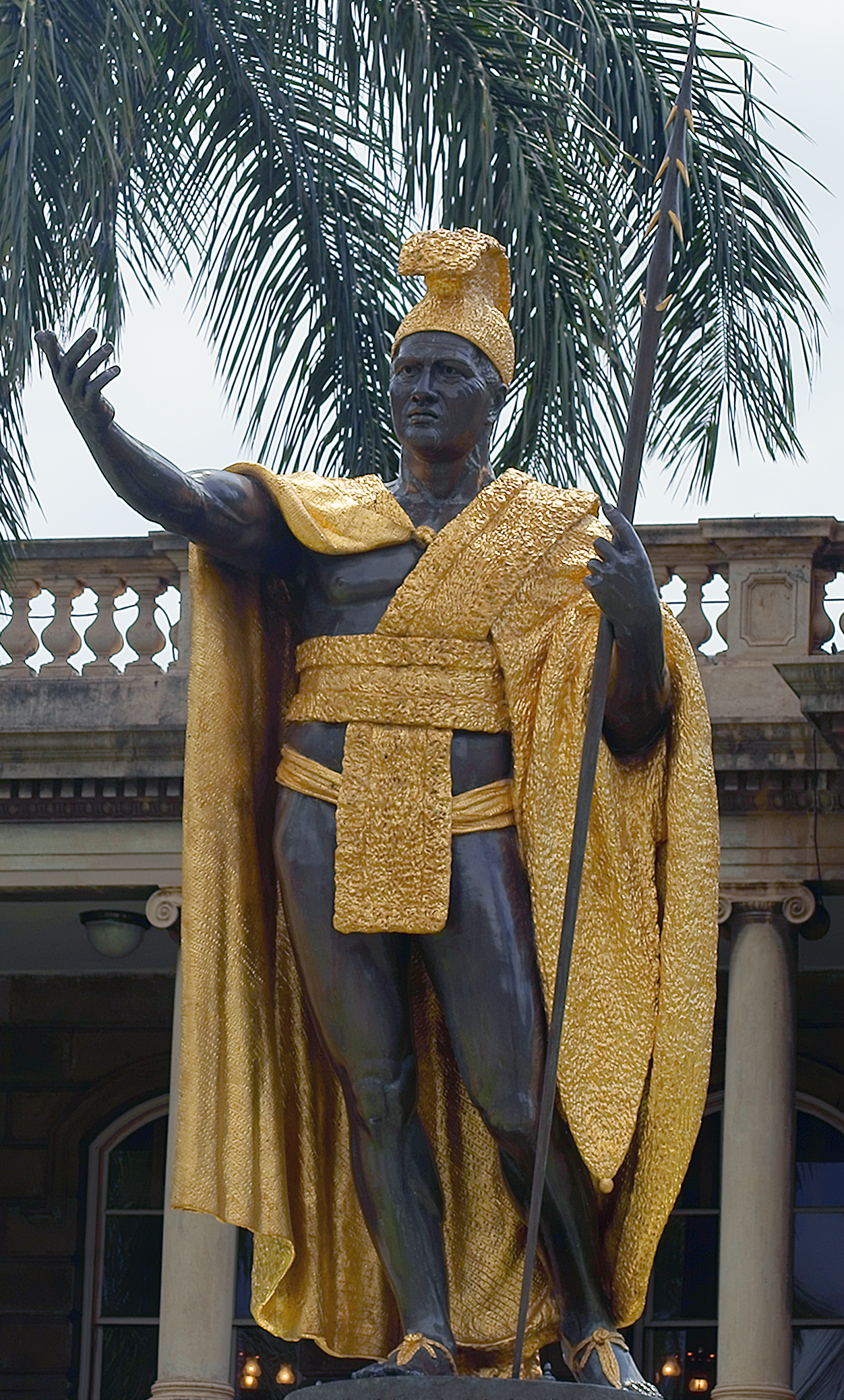
Kamehameha I, 3/4 view

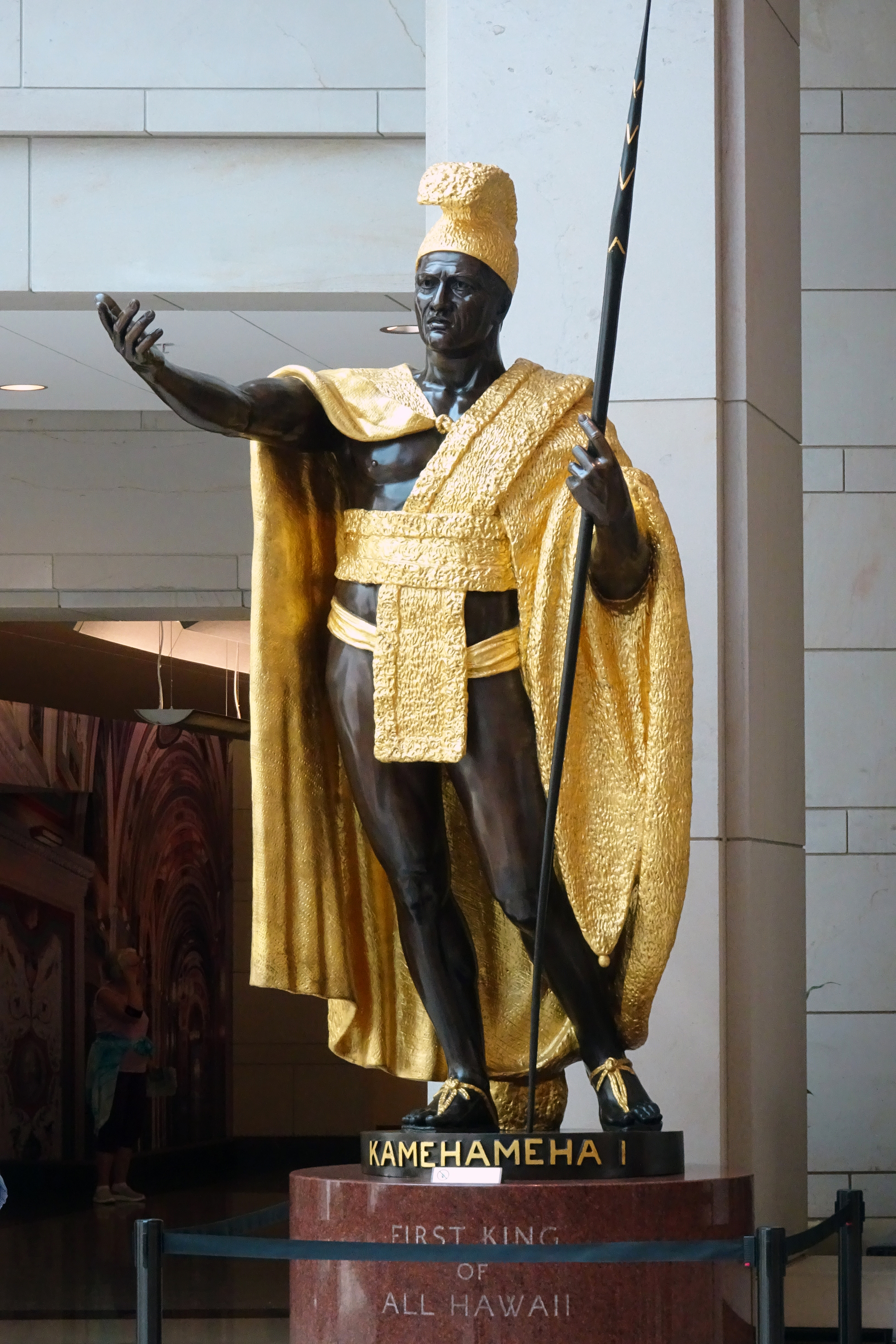
The replica statue in the National Statuary Hall Collection at the U.S. Capitol

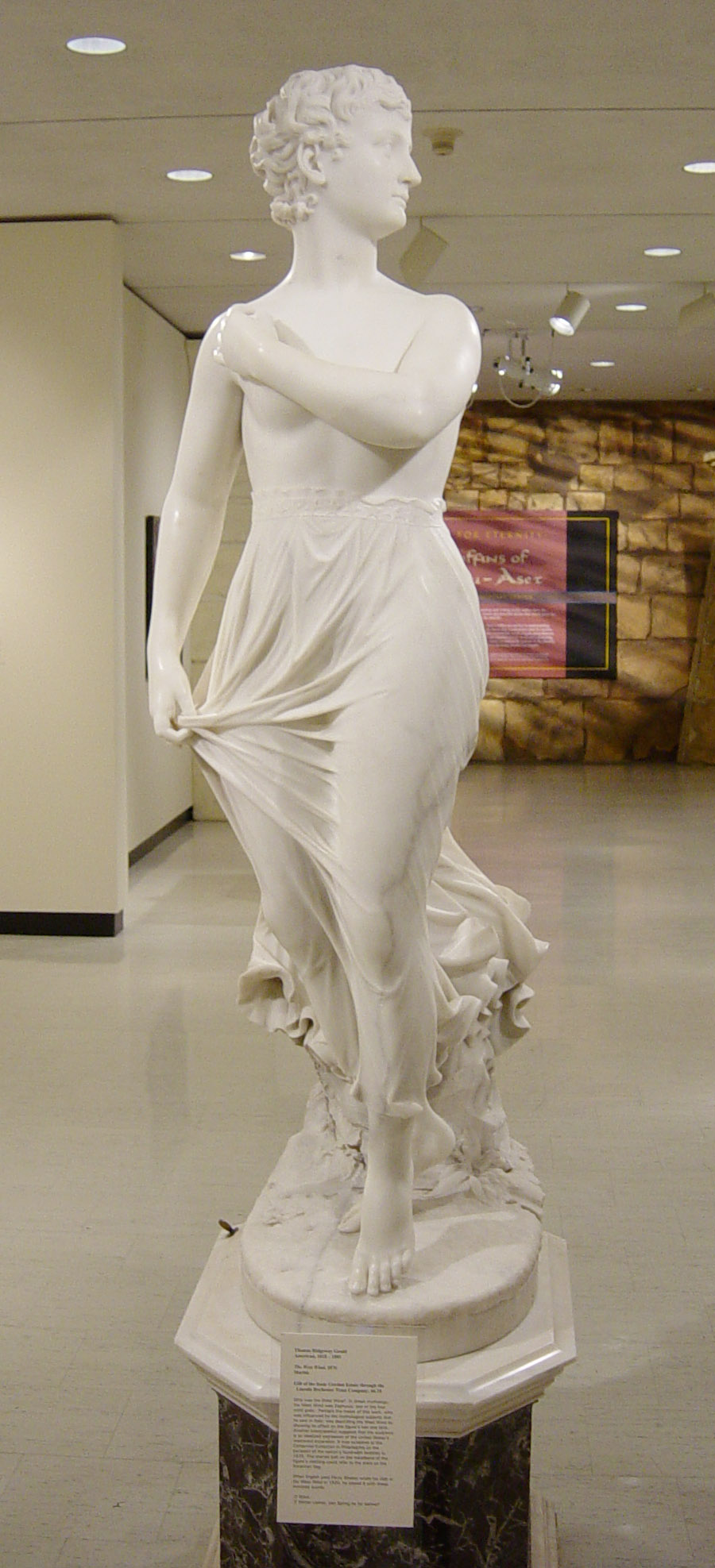
West Wind

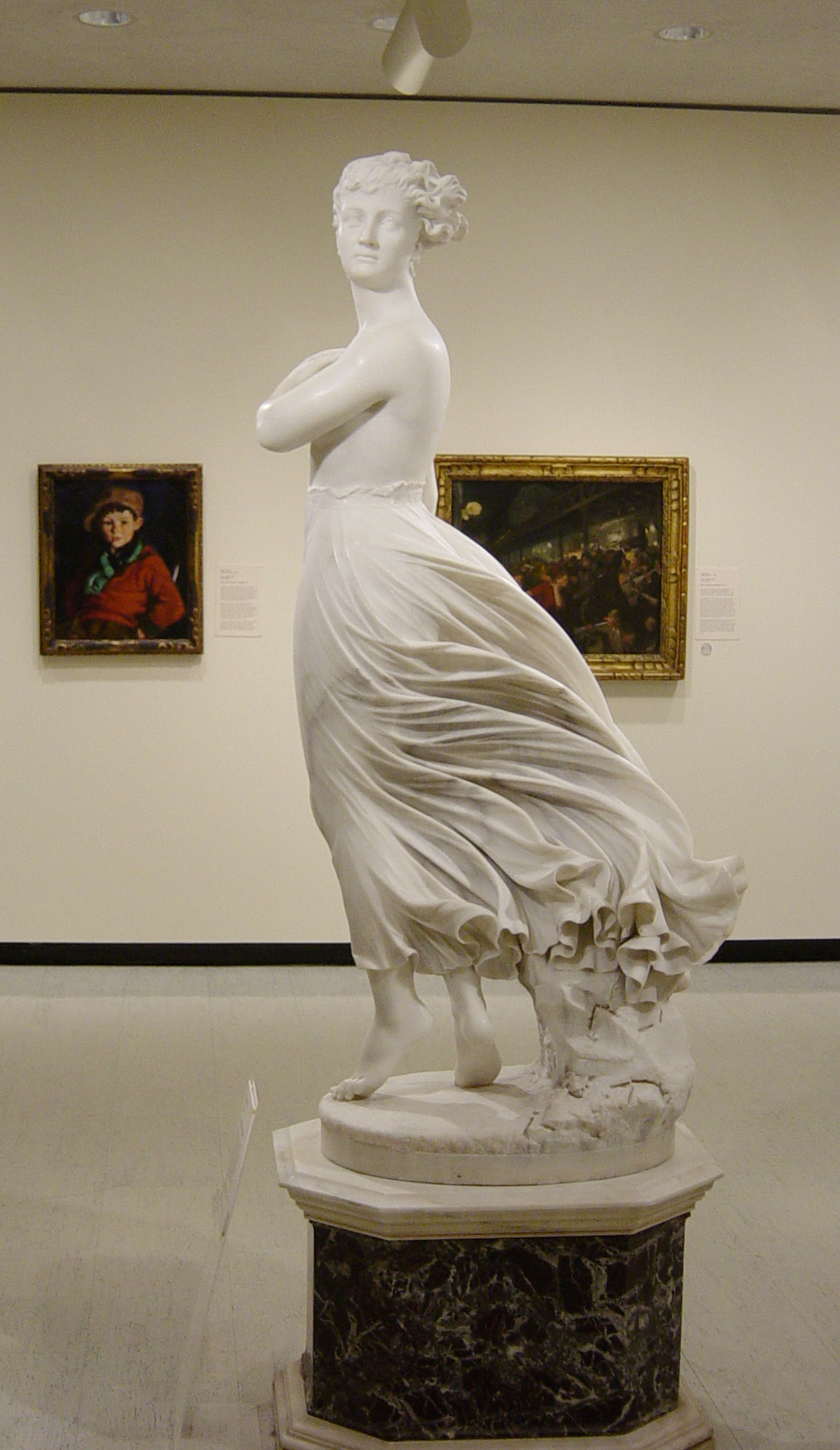
West Wind (profile)

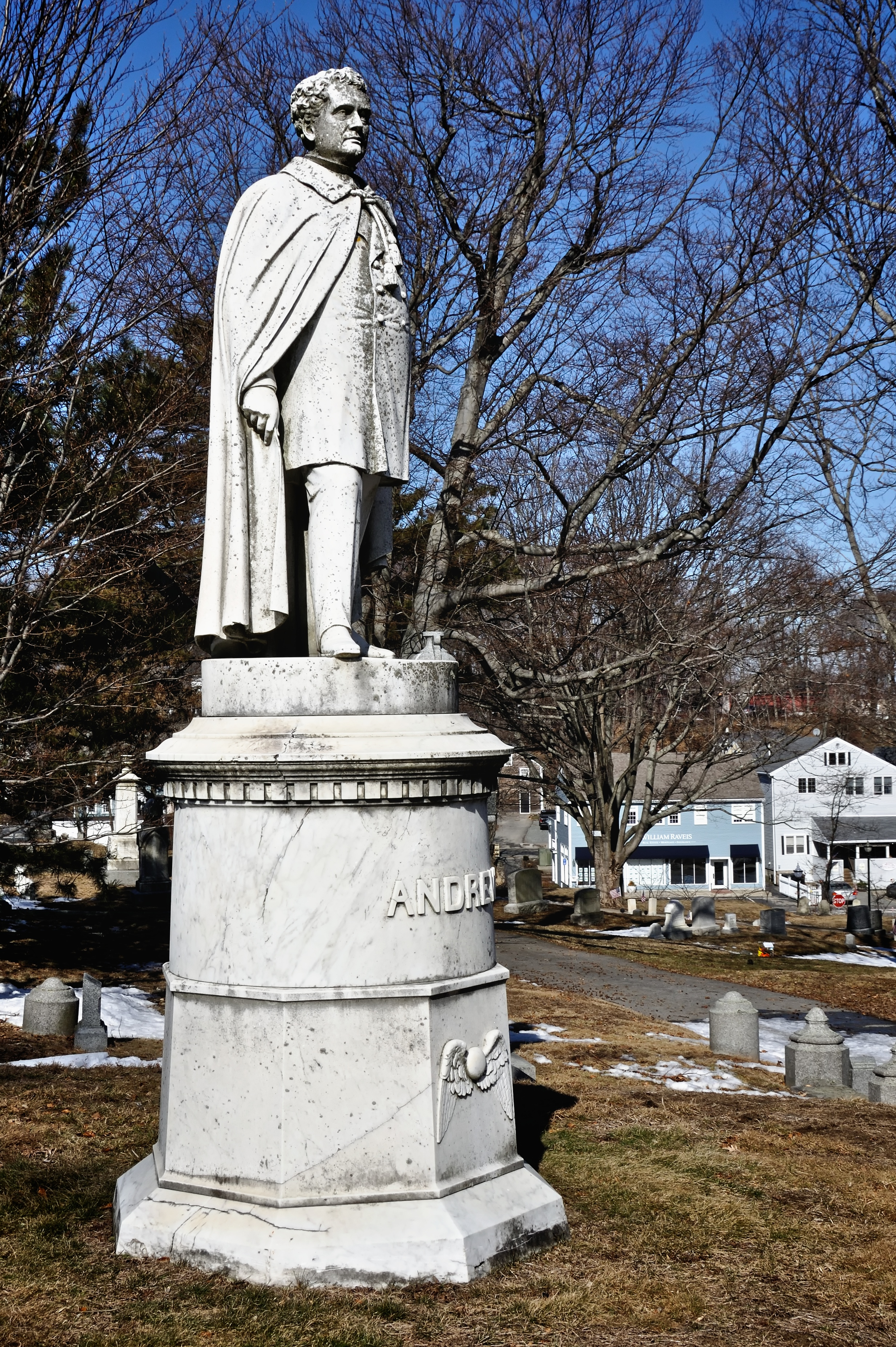
Statue of Massachusetts Governor John Albion Andrew, Old Ship Burying Ground, Hingham, Massachusetts
