= Index of Hawaii-related articles =

The following is an alphabetical list of articles related to the U.S. state of Hawaii:

== 0–9 ==
The location of the state of Hawaii in relation to the rest of the United States of America

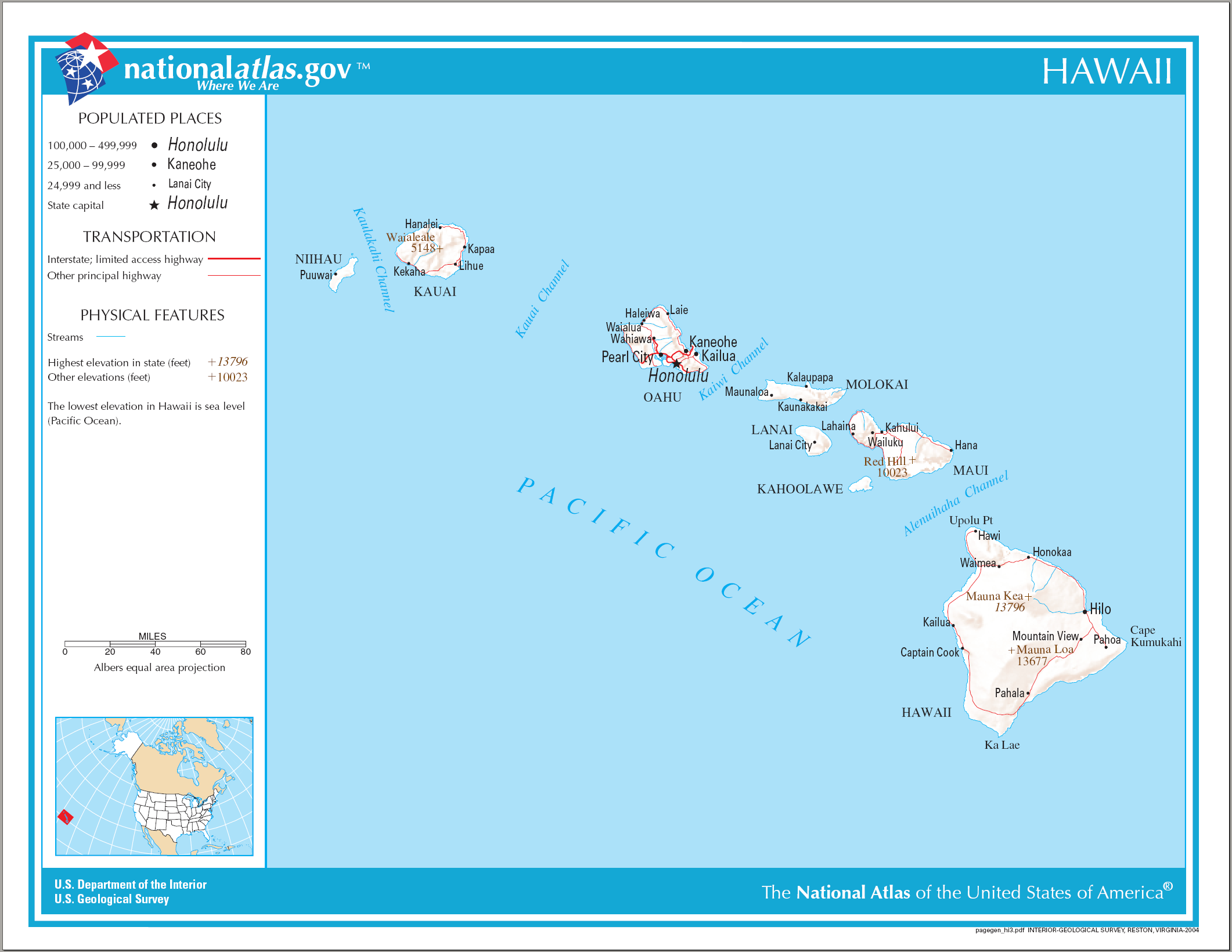
An enlargeable map of the state of Hawaii

- .hi.us – Internet second-level domain for the state of Hawaii
- 25th Infantry Division
- 29th Hawaii State Legislature
- 50th state to join the United States of America
- 100th Infantry Battalion, 442nd Regimental Combat Team
- 154th Wing
- 1840 Constitution of the Kingdom of Hawaii
- 1852 Constitution of the Kingdom of Hawaii
- 1864 Constitution of the Kingdom of Hawaii
- 1868 Hawaii earthquake
- 1887 Constitution of the Kingdom of Hawaii
- 1892 Legislative Session of the Kingdom of Hawaii
- 1895 Wilcox rebellion
- 1955 Hawaiian submarine eruption
- 1975 Hawaii earthquake
- 1978 Hawaii State Constitutional Convention
- 1999 Hawaii Rainbow Warriors football team
- 2004 Hawaii Bowl
- 2006 Kiholo Bay earthquake
- 2012 Hawaii hailstorm
- 2012 Hawaiian Islands Invitational
- 2018 Hawaii false missile alert

== ʻOkina ==
- ʻĀhihi-Kīnaʻu Natural Area Reserve
- ʻAhu ʻula
- ʻĀhualoa
- ʻĀhuimanu
- ʻAiea, Hawaii
- ʻAiea High School
- ʻĀina Haina
- ʻĀinahau
- ʻĀinaloa
- ʻĀinapō Trail
- ʻAkaka Falls State Park
- ʻAkoni Pule Highway
- ʻEleʻele
- ʻEwa Beach, Hawaii
- ʻEwa District, Hawaii
- ʻEwa Gentry, Hawaii
- ʻEwa Villages, Hawaii
- ʻĪao Theater
- ʻĪao Valley
- ʻImiloa Astronomy Center
- ʻImiola Church
- ʻIolani Barracks
- ʻIolani Luahine Hula Festival
- ʻIolani Palace
- ʻIolani School
- ʻŌʻōkala, Hawaii
- ʻOkina
- ʻŌmaʻo
- ʻŌpaekaʻa Falls
- ʻŌpaekaʻa Road Bridge
- ʻUalapuʻe, Hawaii
- ʻŪkēkē
- ʻUpolu Point

== A ==
- A.J. Williamson House
- A. Nanbu Hotel-Holy's Bakery
- Abbott Seamount
- ABC Stores (Hawaii)
- Abortion in Hawaii
- AES Hawaii Power Plant
- Africans in Hawaii
- Agriculture in Hawaiʻi
  - commons:Category:Agriculture in Hawaii
- Āhole Hōlua Complex
- Ahu A ʻUmi Heiau
- Ahukini Terminal and Railway Company
- Ahupuaʻa
- Ahupuaʻa O Kahana State Park
- Ainahou Ranch (ʻāina hou)
- Aikāne
- Air Force–Hawaii football rivalry
- Air Force Maui Optical and Supercomputing observatory
- Air Hawaii
- Akaka Bill, Native Hawaiian Government Reorganization Act of 2009 (S1011/HR2314)
- Akupu, Hawaii
- Ala Kahakai National Historic Trail
- Ala Moana
- Ala Moana Beach Park
- Ala Moana Center
- Alaea salt (ʻalaea)
- Alakaʻi Wilderness Preserve
- Albert Spencer Wilcox Beach House
- Albert Spencer Wilcox Building
- Alexander & Baldwin Sugar Museum
- Alexander Young Building
- Alfred Hocking House
- Aliʻi
- Aliʻi nui of Hawaii
- Allerton Garden
- Aloha
- Aloha ʻĀina
- Aloha Air Cargo
- Aloha Airlines
- Aloha Bowl
- Aloha Festivals
- Aloha Jewish Chapel
- Aloha Petroleum
- Aloha Stadium
- Aloha Tower
- ALOHAnet
- Aloha shirt
- Amfac, Inc.
- Amphibious caterpillar
- Amusement parks in Hawaiʻi
  - commons:Category:Amusement parks in Hawaii
- Anahola, Hawaii
- Anahulu River
- Ancient Hawaii
- Ancient Hawaiian aquaculture
- Ancient Hawaiian population
- Anna Ranch Heritage Center
- Apology Resolution
- Apostolic Vicar of the Hawaiian Islands
- Aqua Hotels and Resorts
- Aquaria in Hawaiʻi
  - commons:Category:Aquaria in Hawaii
- Arboreta in Hawaiʻi
  - commons:Category:Arboreta in Hawaii
- Archaeology of Hawaiʻi
  - Category:Archaeological sites in Hawaii
    - commons:Category:Archaeological sites in Hawaii
- Archeological Sites at Kawela
- Archipelago
- Architecture of Hawaiʻi
- Area code 808
- Area codes in Hawaiʻi
- Arizona Memorial
- Art museums and galleries in Hawaiʻi
  - commons:Category:Art museums and galleries in Hawaii
- Asian immigration to Hawaii
- Assets School
- Associated Students of the University of Hawaii
- Astronomical observatories in Hawaiʻi
  - commons:Category:Astronomical observatories in Hawaii
- Attorney General of Hawaii
- Aulani (ʻaulani)
- Aviation in Hawaii

== B ==
- Bailey House Museum
- Bamboo Ridge
- Bank of Hawaii
- Banzai Pipeline
- Barbers Point Light (Hawaii)
- Battle of Kealakekua Bay
- Battle of Kepaniwai
- Battle of Mokuohai
- Battle of Nuʻuanu
- Beaches of Hawaiʻi
  - commons:Category:Beaches of Hawaii
- Bellows Air Force Station
- Bible translations into Hawaii Pidgin
- Big Five (Hawaii)
- Big Island Film Festival
- Big Island Interscholastic Federation
- Big Island National Wildlife Refuge Complex
- Billings Volcanos
- Birds of Hawaiʻi
- Bishop Museum
- Bishop National Bank of Hawaii
- Black Week (Hawaii)
- Blue Hawaii (drink)
- Blue Note Hawaii
- Botanical gardens in Hawaiʻi
  - commons:Category:Botanical gardens in Hawaii
- Bobcat Trail Habitation Cave
- Boettcher Estate
- Bond District
- Brick Palace
- Brigham Young University–Hawaii
- Buildings and structures in Hawaiʻi
  - commons:Category: Buildings and structures in Hawaii
- TheBus (Honolulu)
- Byodo-In Temple
- BYU–Hawaii Seasiders
- BYU–Hawaii Seasiders men's basketball

== C ==
- Caltech Submillimeter Observatory
- Cathedral Basilica of Our Lady of Peace
- Cathedral Church of Saint Andrew (Honolulu)
- Cannabis in Hawaii
- Canada–France–Hawaii Telescope

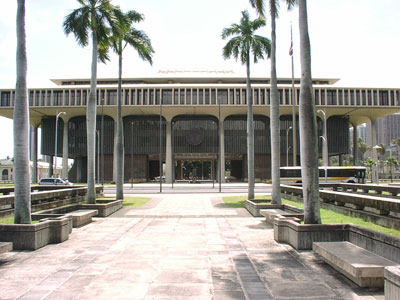
The Hawaiʻi State Capitol in Honolulu

- Canyons and gorges of Hawaiʻi
  - commons:Category:Canyons and gorges of Hawaii
- Cape Kumukahi Light
- Capital of the State of Hawaiʻi
- Capitol of the State of Hawaiʻi
  - commons:Category:Hawaii State Capitol
- Captain Cook, Hawaii
- Vancouver Monument (Maui)
- Casual Friday
- Catholic missions in Hawaiʻi
- Caves of Hawaiʻi
  - commons:Category:Caves of Hawaii
- Ceded lands
- Census statistical areas in Hawaiʻi
- Central Baptist Church (Honolulu, Hawaii)
- Central Pacific Hurricane Center
- Chain of Craters Road
- Channels of the Hawaiian Islands
- Charles Montague Cooke Jr. House and Kūkaʻōʻō Heiau
- Chinatown, Honolulu
- Chinese immigration to Hawaii
- Christmas in Hawaii
- Church of Hawaii
- The Church of Jesus Christ of Latter-day Saints in Hawaii
- Church of the Crossroads
- Climate of Hawaiʻi
- Climate change in Hawaii
- Coco Palms Resort
- Coconut
- Coconut Island (Hawaii Island)
- Coffee production in Hawaii
- Coins of the Hawaiian dollar
- Colahan Seamount
- Committee of Safety (Hawaii)
- Communications in Hawaiʻi
  - commons:Category:Communications in Hawaii
- Communist Party of Hawaii
- The Company (Hawaiian organized crime)
- Congressional delegations from Hawaii
- Constitution of Hawaii
- Co-Cathedral of Saint Theresa of the Child Jesus (Honolulu, Hawaii)
- Committee of Safety (Hawaii)
- Cook Landing Site
- Courts of Hawaii

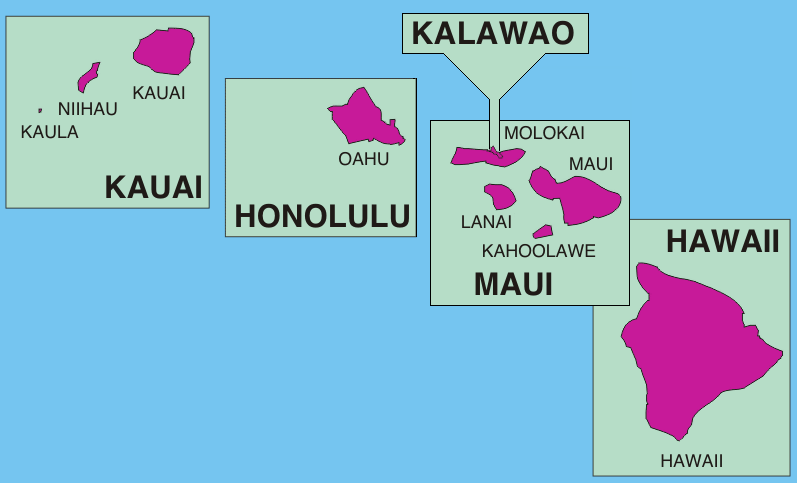
An enlargeable map of the 5 counties of the State of Hawaiʻi

- Convention centers in Hawaiʻi
  - commons:Category:Convention centers in Hawaii
- Counties of the State of Hawaiʻi
  - commons:Category:Counties in Hawaii
- Crestview, Hawaii
- Crime in Hawaii
- Cuisine of Hawaiʻi
- Culture of Hawaiʻi
- Culture of the Native Hawaiians
  - Customs and etiquette in Hawaii
  - Category:Culture of Hawaii
    - commons:Category:Hawaii culture

== D ==
- Daifukuji Soto Zen Mission
- Daikakuji Guyot
- Damien Memorial School
- Daniel K. Inouye International Airport
- Democratic Party of Hawaii
- Demographics of Hawaii
- Demographic history of Hawaii
- Detroit Seamount
- Diamond Head
- Diamond Head Classic
- Diamond Head Lighthouse
- Diamond Head Theatre
- Dillingham Airfield
- Discovery Airways
- Discovery Harbour, Hawaii
- Dole Food Company
- Downtown Honolulu
- Dr. Archibald Neil Sinclair House
- Duke Kahanamoku Invitational Surfing Championship
- Duke Paoa Kahanamoku Lagoon

== E ==
- E Ola Ke Aliʻi Ke Akua
- East Hawaii Cultural Center
- East Honolulu, Hawaii
- East Molokaʻi Volcano
- East–West Center
- Eastern Catholic Community in Hawaii
- Economy of Hawaii
  - Category:Economy of Hawaii
    - commons:Category:Economy of Hawaii
- Eden Roc, Hawaii
- Edict of Toleration (Hawaii)
- Education in Hawaii
  - Category:Education in Hawaii
    - commons:Category:Education in Hawaii
- Education Laboratory School
- Education of Hawaiian Youths Abroad
- Elections in the state of Hawaii
  - Category:Elections in Hawaii
    - commons:Category:Elections in Hawaii
- Electoral reform in Hawaii
- Enchanting Floral Gardens of Kula, Maui
- Endemism in the Hawaiian Islands
- Energy in Hawaii
- Environment Hawaii
- Category:Environment of Hawaii
  - Environmental issues in Hawaii
    - commons:Category:Environment of Hawaii
- Episcopal Diocese of Hawaii
- Equality Hawaii
- Ethanol fuel in Hawaii
- Evolution of Hawaiian volcanoes

== F ==
The Ka Hae Hawaiʻi or flag of the state of Hawaiʻi

- The Fairmont Orchid
- Falls of Clyde (ship)
- John Baptist de Faria
- Farrington Highway
- Farrington-Kaiser-Kalani Complex Area
- Father Damien Statue
- Faulkes Telescope North
- Feast of the Holy Sovereigns
- Federal Building, United States Post Office and Courthouse (Hilo, Hawaii)
- Federal Detention Center, Honolulu
- Felony murder rule (Hawaii)
- Fern Acres, Hawaii
- Fern Forest, Hawaii
- Fern Grotto
- Festivals in Hawaiʻi
  - commons:Category:Festivals in Hawaii
- Festival of Lights (Hawaii)
- Fields Open in Hawaii
- Filipinos in Hawaii
- Fire Stations of Oahu
- First Hawaiian Center
- First Hawaiian International Auto Show
- Fasi, Frank
- Fiftieth State
- First Hawaiian Bank
- Flag of the state of Hawaiʻi
- FlyHawaii Airlines
- Folklore in Hawaiʻi
- Foodland Hawaii
- Ford Island
- Forts in Hawaiʻi
  - Fort Alexander (Hawaii)
  - Fort Armstrong, Hawaii
  - Fort DeRussy Military Reservation
  - Fort Kamehameha
  - Fort Ruger
  - Fort Shafter
  - Category:Forts in Hawaii
    - commons:Category:Forts in Hawaii
- Fort Barrette Road
- Foster Botanical Garden
- Four Seasons Resort Hualalai
- French Frigate Shoals
- French invasion of Honolulu

== G ==
- The Garden Island
- Gardner Pinnacles
- Gemini Observatory
- Genetic engineering in Hawaii
- Geography of Hawaii
  - Category:Geography of Hawaii
    - commons:Category:Geography of Hawaii
- George D. Oakley House
- Georges de S. Canavarro House
- Ghost towns of Hawaiʻi
  - Category:Ghost towns in Hawaii
    - commons:Category:Ghost towns in Hawaii
- Glass Beach (Eleele, Hawaii)
- Global warming in Hawaii
- Goat Island (Hawaii)
- Golf clubs and courses in Hawaii
  - Category:Golf clubs and courses in Hawaiʻi
- Government of the State of Hawaiʻi
  - Category:Government of Hawaii
    - commons:Category:Government of Hawaii
- Governor of the State of Hawaiʻi
  - List of governors of Hawaiʻi
- Governors of Hawaii (island)
- Grand Wailea Resort
- Grass Island (Hawaii)
- Grassroot Institute
- Great Māhele
- Great Seal of the State of Hawaiʻi
- Greeks in Hawaii
- Green Party of Hawaii
- Greenwell Store
- Grove Farm (Lihue, Hawaii)
- Guitar and Lute Workshop
- Gun laws in Hawaii

== H ==
- H. Alexander Walker Residence
- Haena Archeological Complex
- Hāʻena, Hawaiʻi County, Hawaii
- Hāʻena, Kauaʻi County, Hawaii
- Haʻena State Park
- Haikili
- Haiku
- Haiku Mill
- Haiku-Pauwela, Hawaii
- Haiku Stairs
- Haili Church Choir
- Hakalau, Hawaii
- Hakalau Forest National Wildlife Refuge
- Halalii Lake
- Halaula, Hawaii
- Hālawa
- Halawa Correctional Facility
- Hālawa, Molokaʻi
- Haleakalā
- Haleakalā National Park
- Haleakala Observatory
- Haleakala Trail
- Haleakala Wilderness
- Hale Halawai O Holualoa
- Halehomaha, Hawaii
- Haleiwa, Hawaii
- Haleiwa Fighter Strip
- Halekulani (hotel)
- Halemaʻumaʻu
- Hale o Keawe
- Halfway Bridge (Kauaʻi)
- Haliimaile, Hawaii
- Hālona Blowhole
- Halulu Lake
- Hamakua
- Hamilton Library (Hawaii)
- Hana
- Hana Airport
- Hana aloha
- Hana Highway
- Hānai
- Hānaiakamalama
- Hanalani Schools
- Hanalei
- Hanalei Bay
- Hanalei Elementary School
- Hanalei Pier
- Hanalei River
- Hanamaulu, Hawaii
- Hanapepe, Hawaii
- Hanapepe massacre
- Hanauma Bay
- Hans L'Orange Field
- Haole
- Hapa
- Hapuna Beach State Recreation Area
- Hauʻula, Hawaii
- Hawaiʻi
  - Category:Hawaii
    - commons:Category:Hawaii
      - commons:Category:Maps of Hawaii
- Hawaii (island)
- Hawaii Academy of Arts and Sciences
- Hawaiʻi Academy of Recording Arts
- Hawaii Admission Act
- Hawaii Air Depot Volunteer Corp
- Hawaii Air National Guard
- Hawaii–Aleutian Time Zone
- Hawaii Aloha (unofficial state song)
- Hawaii and the American Civil War
- Hawaii Army National Guard
- Hawaii Audubon Society
- Hawaii Baptist Academy
- Hawaii Belt Road
- Hawaii Board of Education
- Hawaii Bowl
- Hawaii Business
- Hawaii Catholic Herald
- Hawaii Capital Historic District
- Hawaii Center for Volcanology
- Hawaii College of Pharmacy
- Hawaii Collegiate Baseball League
- Hawaii Community College
- Hawaii Community Federal Credit Union
- Hawaii Consolidated Railway
- Hawaii Constitutional Amendment 2
- Hawaii County Band
- Hawaii County, Hawaii
- Hawaiʻi County Police Department
- Hawaii Convention Center
- Hawaiʻi creeper
- Hawaii Cryptologic Center
- Hawaii Davis Cup team
- Hawaii Defense Volunteers
- Hawaii Democratic caucuses, 2008
- Hawaii Democratic caucuses, 2016
- Hawaii Democratic Revolution of 1954
- Hawaii Department of Education
- Hawaii Department of Health
- Hawaii Department of Human Services
- Hawaii Department of Land and Natural Resources
- Hawaii Department of Public Safety
- Hawaii Department of Transportation
- Hawaii Division of Conservation and Resource Enforcement
- Hawaii elections, 2012
- Hawaii Electric Vehicle Demonstration Project
- Hawaiʻi ʻelepaio
- Hawaii Emergency Management Agency
- Hawaii Five-O (five-oh)
- Hawaii Five-0 (five-zero)
- Hawaii gubernatorial election, 1959
- Hawaii gubernatorial election, 1962
- Hawaii gubernatorial election, 1966
- Hawaii gubernatorial election, 1970
- Hawaii gubernatorial election, 1974
- Hawaii gubernatorial election, 1978
- Hawaii gubernatorial election, 1982
- Hawaii gubernatorial election, 1986
- Hawaii gubernatorial election, 1990
- Hawaii gubernatorial election, 1994
- Hawaii gubernatorial election, 1998
- Hawaii gubernatorial election, 2002
- Hawaii gubernatorial election, 2006
- Hawaii gubernatorial election, 2010
- Hawaii gubernatorial election, 2014
- Hawaii gubernatorial election, 2018
- Hawaii Hammerheads
- Hawaii Health Connector
- Hawaii High School Athletic Association
- Hawaii Hochi
- Hawaii hotspot
- Hawaii House Bill 444
- Hawaii House of Representatives
- Hawaii Housing Authority v. Midkiff
- Hawaiʻi Institute of Marine Biology
- Hawaii Inter-Island Cable System
- Hawaii Intermediate Court of Appeals
- Hawaii International Conference on Education
- Hawaii International Conference on System Sciences
- Hawaii International Film Festival
- Hawaii Island Journal
- Hawaii Islanders
- Hawaii Kai, Hawaii
- Hawaii Kotohira Jinsha – Hawaii Dazaifu Tenmangu
- Hawaii Land Court
- Hawaiiloa
- Hawaii Loa College
- Hawaii lunar sample displays
- Hawaii mamo
- Hawaii Maritime Center
- Hawaii Marriage Equality Act
- Hawaii Medical Service Association
- Hawaii Music Awards
- Hawaii National Bank
- Hawaii National Guard
- Hawaii Naval Militia
- Hawaii News Now
- Hawaii Nui Brewing Company
- Hawaii Ocean Time-series
- Hawaii Open
- Hawaii Opera Theatre
- Hawaii overprint note
- Hawaii Pacific Baptist Convention
- Hawaii Pacific Sharks
- Hawaii Pacific University
- Hawaiʻi Ponoʻī (official state song)
- Hawaii Prepaid Health Care Act
- Hawaii Preparatory Academy
- Hawaii Professional Football League
- Hawaii Prosecuting Attorney Office, Criminal Investigations Unit
- Hawaii Public Radio
- Hawaii Public Utilities Commission
- Hawaii Rainbow Wahine basketball
- Hawaii Rainbow Wahine softball
- Hawaii Rainbow Wahine volleyball
- Hawaii Rainbow Warriors and Rainbow Wahine
- Hawaii Rainbow Warriors basketball
- Hawaii Rainbow Warriors football
- Hawaii regional cuisine
- Hawaii Republican caucuses, 2008
- Hawaii Republican Party
- Hawaii Reserves
- Hawaii Route 30
- Hawaii Route 31
- Hawaii Route 37
- Hawaii Route 50
- Hawaii Route 51
- Hawaii Route 56
- Hawaii Route 58
- Hawaii Route 61
- Hawaii Route 63
- Hawaii Route 64
- Hawaii Route 72
- Hawaii Route 76
- Hawaii Route 92
- Hawaii Route 93
- Hawaii Route 200
- Hawaii Route 240
- Hawaii Route 377
- Hawaii Route 440
- Hawaii Route 520
- Hawaii Route 540
- Hawaii Route 541
- Hawaii Route 550
- Hawaii Route 560
- Hawaii Route 570
- Hawaii Route 580
- Hawaii Route 8930
- Hawaii Rugby Football Union
- Hawaii Senate
- Hawaii Senate Bill 232
- Hawaii Senate elections, 2012
- Hawaii Sesquicentennial half dollar
- Hawaii Shingon Mission
- Hawaiʻi Sign Language
- Hawaii Slam
- Hawaii Sports Hall of Fame
- Hawaii Stars
- Hawaii State Art Museum
- Hawaii State Bar Association
- Hawaii State Capitol
- Hawaii State Circuit Courts
- Hawaii State District Courts
- Hawaii State Family Courts
- Hawaii State Federal Credit Union
- Hawaii State Foundation on Culture and the Arts
- Hawaii State Judiciary
- Hawaii State Legislature
- Hawaii State Library
- Hawaii State Open
- Hawaii State Public Library System
- Hawaii statistical areas
- Hawaii State Student Council
- Hawaii Superferry
- Hawaii Symphony
- Hawaii–Tahiti relations
- Hawaii Tax Appeal Court
- Hawaii Technology Academy
- Hawaii Technology Institute
- Hawaii Tennis Open
- Hawaii Territorial Guard
- Hawaii Territory's at-large congressional district
- Hawaii Theatre
- Hawaii Theological Seminary
- Hawaii Tokai International College
- Hawaii Tribune-Herald
- Hawaii Tropical Botanical Garden
- Hawaii Tsunami
- Hawaiʻi trivia
- Hawaii Undersea Research Laboratory
- Hawaii v. Office of Hawaiian Affairs
- Hawaii v. Standard Oil Co. of California
- Hawaii Volcanoes National Park
- Hawaii Volcanoes Wilderness
- Hawaii wine
- Hawaii Wing Civil Air Patrol
- Hawaii Winter Baseball
- Hawaii–Wyoming football rivalry
- Hawaii Youth Opera Chorus
- Hawaii Youth Symphony
- Hawaii's 1st congressional district
- Hawaii's 2nd congressional district
- Hawaii's at-large congressional district
- Hawaii's congressional districts
- Hawaii's Opportunity Probation with Enforcement
- Hawaii's Story by Hawaii's Queen
- Hawaiian Acres, Hawaii
- Hawaiian Airlines
- Hawaiian Airlines destinations
- Hawaiian alphabet
- Hawaiian aquaculture
- Hawaiian architecture
- Hawaiian Beaches, Hawaii
- Hawaiian Braille
- Hawaiian congressional delegations
- Hawaiian Division
- Hawaiian dollar
- Hawaiian Ecosystems at Risk project
- Hawaiian Electric Company
- Hawaiian Electric Industries
- Hawaiian–Emperor seamount chain
- Hawaiian Entomological Society
- Hawaiian eruption
- Hawaiian ethnobiology
- Hawaiian Falls
- Hawaiian folklore
- Hawaiian geography (overview)
- Hawaiian goose (state bird)
- Hawaiian hibiscus
- Hawaiian Historical Society
- Hawaiian home land
- Hawaiian honeycreeper
- Hawaiian Humane Society
- Hawaiian Islanders
- Hawaiian Island Charts
- Hawaiian Islands
- Hawaiian Islands Biosphere Reserve
- Hawaiian Islands Humpback Whale National Marine Sanctuary
- Hawaiian Islands Invitational
- Hawaiian Islands Land Trust
- Hawaiian kinship
- Hawaiian language
- Hawaiian lava sledding
- Hawaiian Legacy Reforestation Initiative
- Hawaiian literature
- Hawaiian Mission Academy
- Hawaiian Mission Houses Historic Site and Archives
- Hawaiian Missionaries (stamps)
- Hawaiian Music Hall of Fame
- Hawaiian mythology
- Hawaiian name
- Hawaiian News Company
- Hawaiian Ocean View, Hawaii
- Hawaiian Organic Act
- Hawaiian Paradise Park, Hawaii
- Hawaiian Philatelic Society
- Hawaiian phonology
- Hawaiian Pidgin
- Hawaiian pizza
- Hawaiian Potters Guild
- Hawaiian Pro
- Hawaiian Punch
- Hawaiian quilt
- Hawaiian Railway Society
- Hawaiian rebellions (1887–95)
- Hawaiian religion
- Hawaiian Renaissance
- Hawaiian scale
- Hawaiian sovereignty movement
- Hawaiian studies
- Hawaiian Sugar Planters' Association
- Hawaiian sugar strike of 1946
- Hawaiian Tel Federal Credit Union
- Hawaiian Telcom
- Hawaiian Tropic
- Hawaiian tropical dry forests
- Hawaiian tropical high shrublands
- Hawaiian tropical low shrublands
- Hawaiian tropical rainforests
- Hawaiian Trough
- Hawaiian Volcano Observatory
- Hawaiian Way Fund
- Hawaiiana
- Hawaiianize
- The Hawaiians (WFL)
- Hawi, Hawaii
- Hawi Wind Farm
- He Mele Lahui Hawaii
- Heʻeia, Hawaii
- Heʻeia State Park
- Heiau
- Henry Perrine Baldwin High School
- Heritage railroads in Hawaiʻi
  - commons:Category:Heritage railroads in Hawaii
- HI – United States Postal Service postal code for the State of Hawaiʻi
- Hickam Air Force Base
- Hickam Field
- Hickam Housing, Hawaii
- High Altitude Observatory
- Highway routes in Hawaiʻi
- Hiilawe Waterfall
- Hiking trails in Hawaiʻi
  - commons:Category:Hiking trails in Hawaii
- Hilina Slump
- Hilo
- Hilo Bay
- Hilo High School
- Hilo International Airport
- Hilo Masonic Lodge Hall-Bishop Trust Building
- Hilo massacre
- Hilo (soil)
- Hilton Hawaiian Village
- Hilton Waikoloa Village USTA Challenger
- History of Hawaii
  - Historical outline of Hawaiʻi
    - Category:History of Hawaii
      - commons:Category:History of Hawaii
- History of Maui
- Hokukano-Ualapue Complex
- Holaniku at Keahole Point
- Holualoa Bay
- Holualoa, Hawaii
- Holy Ghost Catholic Church (Kula, Hawaii)
- Holy Trinity Catholic Church (Honolulu)
- Home Rule Party of Hawaii
- Honalo, Hawaii
- Hōnaunau, Hawaii
- Honaunau-Napoopoo, Hawaii
- Honokaa, Hawaii
- Honokaa High & Intermediate School
- Honokohau Harbor
- Honolua, Hawaii
- Honolulu, royal, republican, territorial, and state capital since 1845
- The Honolulu Advertiser
- Honolulu City Council
- Honolulu Community College
- Honolulu County, Hawaii
- Honolulu Courthouse riot
- Honolulu Hale
- Honolulu Harbor
- Honolulu International Airport
- Honolulu
- Honolulu Marathon
- Honolulu mayoral election, 2010
- Honolulu mayoral election, 2012
- Honolulu mayoral election, 2016
- Honolulu molasses spill
- Honolulu Museum of Art
- Honolulu Museum of Art Spalding House
- Honolulu Police Department
- Honolulu Stadium
- Honolulu Star-Advertiser
- Honolulu Star-Bulletin
- Honolulu Tudor–French Norman Cottages
- Honolulu University
- Honolulu Waldorf School
- Honolulu Weekly
- Honomu, Hawaii
- Honouliuli Internment Camp
- Honpa Hongwanji Mission of Hawaii
- Hoʻokipa
- Hoʻolehua, Hawaii
- Hoʻomaluhia Botanical Garden
- Hoʻoponopono
- Hospital Rock Tunnels
- House of Kamehameha
- House of Kawānanakoa
- House of Keawe
- House of Laanui
- Hualālai
- Hualalai Academy
- Hula
- Huleia National Wildlife Refuge
- Huliheʻe Palace
- Hurricane Iwa
- Hurricane Iniki

== I ==
- Images of Hawaii
  - commons:Category:Hawaii
- Immaculate Conception Catholic Church (Lihue, Hawaii)
- Independence Day (Hawaii)
- Independent (Kuokoa) Party
- Institute for Astronomy
- Interstate H-1
- Interstate H-2
- Interstate H-3
- Interstate H-201
- Invasive species in Hawaii
- Ipu
- Ironman World Championship
- Iroquois Point, Hawaii
- Isaac Hale Beach Park
- Isaacs Art Center
- Islam Day (Hawaii)
- Islam in Hawaii
- Island Air (Hawaii)
- Island Sports Media
- Island of Hawaiʻi
- Islands of Hawaiʻi
  - Hawaiʻi
- Island Pacific Energy
  - Kahoʻolawe
  - Kauaʻi
  - Lānaʻi
  - Maui
  - Molokaʻi
  - Niʻihau
  - Oʻahu
- Island School (Hawaii)
- Izumo Taishakyo Mission of Hawaii

== J ==
- James Campbell High School
- James Campbell National Wildlife Refuge
- James Clerk Maxwell Telescope
- Japanese in Hawaii
- Japanese loanwords in Hawaii
- Le Jardin Academy
- Jingū Seamount
- John Guild House
- John H. Wilson Tunnels
- John Young Museum of Art
- Joint Astronomy Centre
- Joint Base Pearl Harbor–Hickam
- Joseph W. Podmore Building

== K ==
- Ka Nupepa Kuokoa
- Kaʻaʻawa, Hawaii
- Kaahumanu Church
- Kaʻahumanu Society
- Kaʻala
- Kaanapali
- Kaanapali Airport
- Kaena Point
- Kaena Ridge
- Ka Lae (south cape)
- Ka Leo O Hawaii
- Ka Loko Reservoir
- Kahakuloa, Hawaii
- Kāhala, Hawaii
- Kahōʻāliʻi
- Kahuku Army Air Field
- Kahului Railroad
- Kahaluʻu
- Kahaluʻu Bay
- Kahaluʻu-Keauhou, Hawaii
- Kahaluʻu Taro Loʻi
- Kahanu Garden
- Kaheawa Wind Power
- Kahiko
- Kahikolu Church
- Kahoʻolawe
- Kahuku, Hawaii
- Kahuku High & Intermediate School
- Kahuku Wind Farm
- Kahului Airport
- Kahuna
- Kai Opae
- Kaia Ranch Tropical Botanical Gardens
- Kailua, Hawaii County, Hawaii
- Kailua High School
- Kailua, Honolulu County, Hawaii
- Kailua-Kona
- Kaimū
- Kaimuki
- Kaimuki High School
- Kaimuki-McKinley-Roosevelt Complex Area
- Kainaliu, Hawaii
- Kakaako
- Kakaako Pumping Station
- Kakaako Waterfront Park
- Kakahaia National Wildlife Refuge
- Kalaeloa, Hawaii
- Kalaeloa Airport
- Kalaheo, Hawaii
- Kalaheo High School
- Kalākaua's 1881 world tour
- Kalakaua Park
- Kalalau Trail
- Kalani High School
- Kalani Oceanside Retreat
- Kalaoa, Hawaii
- Kalapana
- Kalaupapa
- Kalaupapa Airport
- Kalaupapa National Historical Park
- Kalawao, Hawaii
- Kalepolepo Fishpond
- Kalihi
- Kalihiwai, Hawaii
- Kaloko-Honokōhau National Historical Park
- Kalopa State Recreation Area
- Kalua
- Kamaʻaina
- Kamaʻehuakanaloa Seamount
- Kamakahonu
- Kamaka Ukulele
- Kamakou
- Kamapuaʻa
- Kamehameha Day
- Kamehameha Highway
- Kamehameha Schools
- Kamehameha Schools Hawaii Campus
- Kamehameha Statue (Honolulu cast)
- Kamehameha Statues
- Kamohoalii
- Kanaha Pond State Wildlife Sanctuary
- Kanaiolowalu
- Kanaloa
- Kāne
- Kanemitsu Bakery
- Kāneʻohe Bay
- Kaneohe Ranch Building
- Kaniakapupu
- Kapa
- Kapaa, Hawaii
- Kapaau, Hawaii
- Kapālama
- Kapalua, Hawaii
- Kapalua Airport
- Kapalua International
- Kapalua LPGA Classic
- Kapiʻolani Community College
- Kapiʻolani Community College Cactus Garden
- Kapiolani Park
- Kapoho, Hawaii
- Kapolei, Hawaii
- Kapolei High School
- Kapu
- Kau, Hawaii
- Kau High and Pahala Elementary School
- Kaʻū Desert
- Kauaʻi
- Kauaʻi Island Utility Cooperative
- Kauaʻi Community College
- Kauai County Fair
- Kauaʻi Educational Association for Science and Astronomy
- Kauhola Point Light
- Kauikeaouli Hale
- Kaʻula
- Kaulaʻināiwi Island
- "Kaulana Na Pua" (song protesting 1893 overthrow and 1898 annexation)
- Kaumahina State Wayside Park
- Kaumakani, Hawaii
- Kaunakakai, Hawaii
- Kaunaoa Bay
- Kaunolu Village Site
- Kaupo, Hawaii
- Kaupulehu, Hawaii
- Kawaihae, Hawaii
- Kawaiahaʻo Church
- Kawaikini
- Kawai Nui Marsh
- Kawela Bay, Hawaii
- Kawelikoa Point
- Kazumura Cave
- KDDB
- Ke Kula o Nawahiokalaniopuu
- Keaau, Hawaii
- Keaau High School
- Keahole Point
- Keaʻiwa Heiau State Recreation Area
- Kealakekua, Hawaii
- Kealakekua Bay
- Kealia, Hawaii
- Kealia Pond National Wildlife Refuge
- Keanae, Hawaii
- Keʻanae Arboretum
- Keauhou Bay
- Keauhou, Hawaii
- Keauhou Holua Slide
- Keawaiki Bay
- Kehena Beach
- Kekaha, Hawaii
- Kekaha Kai State Park
- Keokea, Hawaii County, Hawaii
- Keokea, Maui County, Hawaii
- Keōua Hale
- Kewalo Basin
- KHNL
- Kidnapping of Kalaniʻōpuʻu by Captain James Cook
- Kihei, Hawaii
- Kiʻi
- Kikiaola
- Kīlauea
- Kilauea, Hawaii
- Kīlauea Iki
- Kilauea Light
- Kilauea Military Camp
- Kilauea Plantation
- Kilauea Point National Wildlife Refuge
- King David Kalakaua Building
- King Kekaulike High School
- King Kamehameha Golf Course Clubhouse
- Kingdom of Hawaii, 1810–1894
- Kingdom of Hawaii–United States relations
- Kipahulu, Hawaii
- Kipu Falls
- Koa Coffee Plantation
- Kohala
- Kohala District Courthouse
- Kohala, Hawaii
- Kohala High School
- Kohala Historical Sites State Monument
- Kohala Mountain Road
- Kohanaiki Beach Park
- Kōkeʻe State Park
- Koko Crater Botanical Garden
- Kokomo, Hawaii
- Kolekole Beach Park
- Koloa, Hawaii
- Kona coffee
- Kona Coffee Living History Farm
- Kona District, Hawaii
- Kona Hawaii Temple
- Kona International Airport
- Kona Pacific Public Charter School
- Kona storm
- Konawaena High School
- Koʻolau Range
- Ko Olina Resort
- Ko Olina Station and Center
- Korean immigration to Hawaii
- Kū
- Kuakini Medical Center
- Kualapuu, Hawaii
- Kualoa Ranch
- Kualoa Regional Park
- Kuamoo Burials
- Kūʻē Petitions
- Kuhimana (god)
- Kuhina Nui
- Kuhio Beach Park
- Kukaniloko Birth Site
- Kukini
- Kukuihaele, Hawaii
- Kukui Heiau
- Kula
- Kula Botanical Garden
- Kuleana Act of 1850 (Hawaii)
- Kumu Kahua Theatre
- Kunia Camp, Hawaii
- Kure Atoll
- Kurtistown, Hawaii

== L ==
- L&L Hawaiian Barbecue
- Laʻaloa Bay
- Laʻa Maomao
- Labor Party (Hawaii)
- Ladd & Co.
- Lahaina, Hawaii, royal capital 1820–1845
- Lahaina Banyan Court Park
- Lahaina Gateway
- Lahaina, Kaanapali and Pacific Railroad
- Lahaina Roads
- Lahainaluna High School
- Lakes of Hawaiʻi
  - commons:Category:Lakes of Hawaii
- Laie, Hawaii
- Laie Hawaii Temple
- Lake Waiau
- Lalamilo Wells
- Lānaʻi
- Lanai Airport
- Lanai (architecture)
- Lānaʻi City
- Lanai High and Elementary School
- Lanakila Baptist High School
- Lanakila Baptist Schools
- Landmarks in Hawaiʻi
  - commons:Category:Landmarks in Hawaii
- Languages of Hawaii
- Lanikai Beach
- Lapakahi State Historical Park
- Laplace Affair
- Launiupoko, Hawaii
- Laupāhoehoe
- Laupāhoehoe Community Public Charter School
- Lava Flow Hazard Zones
- Lava Tree State Monument
- Lawai, Hawaii
- Laysan
- Leeward Community College
- Legal status of Hawaii
- Lehua
- Lei (garland)
- Lei Day
- Leilani Estates, Hawaii
- Leilehua High School
- Legislature of the Kingdom of Hawaii
- LGBT history in Hawaii
- LGBT rights in Hawaii
- Lemon Wond Holt House
- Les Murakami Stadium
- Libertarian Party of Hawaii
- Liberty House (US)
- Lieutenant Governor of Hawaii
- Līhuʻe
- Līhuʻe Airport
- Liliuokalani Botanical Garden
- Liliuokalani Park and Gardens
- Liloa's Kāʻei
- Limahuli Garden and Preserve
- Limu o Pele
- Lisianski Island
- Literature in Hawaiʻi
- Living Art Marine Center
- Loco moco
- Lomilomi massage
- Longline bycatch in Hawaii
- Lono
- Lualualei, Hawaii
- Luau
- Lumahaʻi River
- Lunalilo
- Lunalilo Mausoleum
- Lutheran High School of Hawaii
- Lyman House Memorial Museum
- Lyon Arboretum

== M ==
- Maalaea, Hawaii
- Maehara Stadium
- Mahalo
- Mahinahina, Hawaii
- Mahiole
- Māhukona
- Mahukona, Hawaii
- Māili, Hawaii
- Mākaha, Hawaii
- Mākaha Valley, Hawaii
- Makahiku Falls
- Makakilo, Hawaii
- Makaleha Mountains
- Makana
- Makanalua, Hawaii
- Makani Kai Air
- Makapuʻu
- Makapuʻu Point
- Makapuu Point Light
- Makawao, Hawaii
- Makawao Union Church
- Makena State Park
- Malia (canoe)
- Mānana
- Manele, Hawaii
- Manoa
- Manoa Falls
- Manoa Falls Trail
- Manoa (journal)
- Manta ray night dive
- Manuka State Wayside Park
- Maps of Hawaiʻi
  - commons:Category:Maps of Hawaii
- Maria Lanakila Catholic Church
- Marine Corps Air Station Kaneohe Bay
- Maro Reef
- Maui
- Maui Academy of Performing Arts
- Maui Film Festival
- Māui (Hawaiian mythology)
- Maui High School
- Maui Invitational Tournament
- Maui Nui
- Maui Nui Botanical Gardens
- Maui Ocean Center
- Maui solar telescope protests
- Maui Trade Dollars
- Mauna Kea
- Mauna Kea Beach Hotel
- Mauna Kea Ice Age Reserve
- Mauna Kea Observatories
- Mauna Kea State Recreation Area
- Maunaloa, Hawaii
- Mauna Loa
- Mauna Loa Solar Observatory
- Maunawili, Hawaii
- Marine Corps Base Hawaii
- Massie-Kahahawai Case
- Mayor of Hawaii County
- Mayor of Honolulu
- McBryde Garden
- Meadow Gold Dairies (Hawaii)
- Media in Hawaii
- Media in Honolulu
- Meiji Seamount
- Mele (Hawaiian language)
- Menehune
- Menehune Fishpond
- Merrie Monarch Festival
- Midway Atoll
- Mililani
- Mililani High School
- Milolii, Hawaii
- Minister to Hawaii
- Ministry of Finance (Hawaii)
- Ministry of Foreign Affairs (Hawaii)
- Ministry of the Interior (Hawaii)
- Moana Hotel
- Moanalua
- Moanalua Elementary School
- Moanalua High School
- Moiliili, Hawaii
- Moir Gardens
- Mōkōlea Rock
- Mokoliʻi
- Mokuaikaua Church
- Mokuʻāina o Hawaiʻi
- Mokulēia, Hawaii
- Mokulele Airlines
- Moku Manu
- Mokuʻula
- Molii Fishpond
- Moloaa Bay
- Molokaʻi
- Molokai Airport
- Molokai Advertiser-News
- Molokaʻi Airport
- Molokini
- Moʻomomi
- Morse Field (Hawaii)
- Most Sacred Heart of Jesus Catholic Church (Hawi, Hawaii)
- Mount Waialeale
- Mountain Apple Company
- Mountain View, Hawaii
- Mountains of Hawaiʻi
  - commons:Category:Mountains of Hawaii
- Museums in Hawaiʻi
  - Category:Museums in Hawaii
    - commons:Category:Museums in Hawaii
- Music of Hawaii
  - commons:Category:Music of Hawaii
  - Category:Musical groups from Hawaii
  - Category:Musicians from Hawaii
- Muslim Association of Hawaii
- Muumuu

== N ==
- Na ʻĀina Kai Botanical Gardens
- Nā Hōkū Hanohano Awards
- Na Koa Ikaika Maui
- Nā Mokulua
- Nā Pali Coast State Park
- Naalehu, Hawaii
- Nahiku, Hawaii
- Nānākuli, Hawaii
- Nanawale Estates, Hawaii
- Nani Mau Gardens
- Napili, Hawaii
- Napili-Honokowai, Hawaii
- NASA Infrared Telescope Facility
- Nation of Hawaiʻi (organization)
- National Guard of Hawaii
- National Liberal Party (Hawaii)
- National Memorial Cemetery of the Pacific
- National Party (Hawaii)
- National Pearl Harbor Remembrance Day
- National Reform Party (Hawaii)
- National Register of Historic Places listings in Hawaii
- National Register of Historic Places listings in Hawaii Volcanoes National Park
- National Register of Historic Places listings in Oʻahu
- National Tropical Botanical Garden
- Native Hawaiian Legal Corporation
- Natural Area Reserves System Hawaii
- Natural Energy Laboratory of Hawaii Authority
- Natural history of Hawaii
  - commons:Category:Natural history of Hawaii
- Native cuisine of Hawaii
- Native Hawaiians
- Naval Air Station Barbers Point
- Naval Auxiliary Landing Field Ford Island
- Naval Station Pearl Harbor
- Navy Region Hawaii
- Nawiliwili Beach Park
- Neal S. Blaisdell Center
- Necker Island (Hawaii)
- Newlands Resolution
- Nīhoa
- Niʻihau
- Ninole
- Ninole Hills
- Nippu Jiji
- Nintoku Seamount
- Niumalu Beach Park
- North Koolaupoko, Hawaii
- Northwestern Hawaiian Islands
- November 2000 Hawaii floods
- Nuʻuanu Pali
- Nuʻuanu Slide
- NWA Hawaii Heavyweight Championship
- NWA Hawaii Tag Team Championship
- NWA Pacific International Championship

== O ==
- Oʻahu
- Oahu Cemetery
- Oahu Interscholastic Association
- Oahu Open
- Oahu Railway and Land Company
- Ocean Pointe, Hawaii
- Office of Hawaiian Affairs
- Ojin Seamount
- Old Sugar Mill of Koloa
- Olinda, Hawaii
- Olomana High & Intermediate School
- Olomana (mountain)
- Olowalu, Hawaii
- Onion House
- Onizuka Center for International Astronomy
- Opposition to the Mauna Kea Observatories
- Opposition to the overthrow of the Kingdom of Hawaii
- Orchidlands Estates, Hawaii
- Orders, decorations, and medals of Hawaii
- Orthodox Church in Hawaii
- Our Lady Queen of Angels Catholic Church (Kula, Hawaii)
- Our Lady of Good Counsel Catholic Church (Pearl City, Hawaii)
- Our Lady of the Mount Catholic Church (Honolulu)
- Outdoor sculptures in Hawaii
  - commons:Category:Outdoor sculptures in Hawaii
- Overthrow of the Kingdom of Hawaii

== P ==
- Paauhau, Hawaii
- Paauilo, Hawaii
- Pacific Aviation Museum Pearl Harbor
- Pacific Buddhist Academy
- Pacific Roller Derby
- Pacific Tsunami Museum
- Pacific Tsunami Warning Center
- Pacific Western University (Hawaii)
- Pahala
- Pahala Formation
- Pahoa, Hawaii
- Pahoa High and Intermediate School
- Paia, Hawaii
- Pakaa
- Pakala Village, Hawaii
- Palaces in Hawaiʻi
  - commons:Category:Palaces in Hawaii
- Palace Theater (Hilo, Hawaii)
- Paleontology in Hawaii
- Pali Momi Medical Center
- Palolo, Hawaii
- Panaʻewa Rainforest Zoo
- Pāpaʻaloa, Hawaii
- Papahānaumokuākea Marine National Monument
- Papaikou, Hawaii
- Papakolea Beach
- Parker Ranch
- Parker School (Kamuela, Hawaii)
- Pauahi (crater)
- Paukaa, Hawaii
- Paulet Affair (1843)
- Pauoa, Hawaii
- Paupueo
- Peahi, Hawaii
- Pearl and Hermes Atoll
- Pearl City
- Pearl City High School (Hawaii)
- Pearl Harbor
- Pearl Harbor Elementary School
- Pearl Harbor National Wildlife Refuge
- Pearlridge
- Pearl Harbor Memorial
- Pele (deity)
- Penguin Bank
- People from Hawaiʻi
  - Category:People from Hawaii
    - commons:Category:People from Hawaii
    - Category:People from Hawaii by county
- Pepeekeo, Hawaii
- Pepeopae
- La Perouse Bay
- Pidgin Hawaiian
- Plantation Estate
- Plate lunch
- Pohakuloa Training Area
- Poipu, Hawaii
- Poke (fish salad)
- Polipoli Spring State Recreation Area
- Political party strength in Hawaii
- Politics of Hawaii
  - Category:Politics of Hawaii
    - commons:Category:Politics of Hawaii
- Pololū Valley
- Polynesian Adventure Tours
- Polynesian Cultural Center
- Polynesian mythology
- Polynesian Voyaging Society
- Pono
- Poʻouli
- Port Allen, Hawaii
- Port Allen Airport
- Portuguese immigration to Hawaii
- Postage stamps and postal history of Hawaii
- Prefecture Apostolic of the Sandwich Islands for the Catholic missionary history
- President Theodore Roosevelt High School
- President William McKinley High School
- Prince Kuhio Federal Building
- Prince Kuhio Plaza
- Princeville
- Princeville Airport
- Proposed 1893 Constitution of the Kingdom of Hawaii
- Protected areas of Hawaiʻi
  - commons:Category:Protected areas of Hawaii
- Provisional Government of Hawaii, 1893–1894
- Puaʻa-2 Agricultural Fields Archeological District
- Puako, Hawaii
- Pua Mau Place Arboretum and Botanical Garden
- Puerto Rican immigration to Hawaii
- Puhi, Hawaii
- Puka shell
- Pukalani, Hawaii
- Pulu (material)
- Puna, Hawaii
- Punahou Circle apartments
- Punahou School
- Puna-Kāʻu Historic District
- Punaluʻu Black Sand Beach
- Punaluu, Hawaii
- Punchbowl Crater
- Puʻuhonua o Hōnaunau National Historical Park
- Puʻu Huluhulu (Hawaii Route 200)
- Puʻukoholā Heiau National Historic Site
- Puʻu Kukui
- Puʻunene, Hawaii
- Puʻu o Mahuka Heiau State Monument
- Puʻuʻokeʻokeʻo
- Puʻuʻopae Bridge
- Puʻu ʻŌʻō
- Puʻuwai, Hawaii

== Q ==
- Queen Emma of Hawaii
- Queen Emma Party
- Queen Kapiolani
- Queen's Bath
- The Queen's Medical Center

== R ==
- Radiocarbon dating in Hawaii
- Rainbow Falls (Hawaii)
- Reciprocal beneficiary relationships in Hawaii
- Reform Party (Hawaii)
- Religion in Hawaii
  - Category:Religion in Hawaii
    - commons:Category:Religion in Hawaii
- Republic of Hawaii, 1894–1898
- Resurrection of the Lord Catholic Church (Waipahu, Hawaii)
- Richardson Beach
- RIMPAC
- Roberts Hawaii
- Rock fever
- Rock formations in Hawaiʻi
  - commons:Category:Rock formations in Hawaii
- Roman Catholic Diocese of Honolulu
- Royal Guards of Hawaii
- Royal Hawaiian Agricultural Society Medal
- Royal Hawaiian Band
- Royal Hawaiian Hotel
- Royal Kunia, Hawaii
- Royal Mausoleum of Hawaii
- Royal Order of Kalākaua
- Royal Order of Kamehameha I
- Royal School (Hawaii)
- Rulers of the Hawaiian Islands
- Russian Fort Elizabeth

== S ==
- S. Hata Building
- Sacred Falls State Park
- Sacred Hearts Academy
- Sadie Seymour Botanical Gardens
- Saimin
- Saint Ann Catholic Church (Kaneohe, Hawaii)
- Saint Anthony Catholic Church (Honolulu)
- Saint Augustine by the Sea Catholic Church
- Saint John the Baptist Catholic Church (Honolulu, Hawaii)
- Saint Joseph Catholic Church (Hilo, Hawaii)
- Saint Joseph Catholic Church (Makawao, Hawaii)
- Saint Louis School
- Saint Raphael Catholic Church (Koloa, Hawaii)
- Saint Theresa Catholic Church (Kekaha, Hawaii)
- Salt Lake, Hawaii
- Salvation Army Waiʻoli Tea Room
- Same-sex marriage in Hawaii
- Sand Island (Hawaii)
- Sandy Beach, Hawaii
- Sandwich Islands
- Schofield Barracks
- Scouting in Hawaii
- Sea Life Park Hawaii
- Seal of Hawaii
- Settlements in Hawaii
  - Cities in Hawaiʻi
  - Towns in Hawaiʻi
  - Census Designated Places in Hawaiʻi
  - List of ghost towns in Hawaiʻi
  - List of places in Hawaiʻi
- Shaka sign
- Sheraton Hotels and Resorts Hawaii
- Shidler College of Business
- Skyline (Honolulu)
- Slack-key guitar
- SMART Magazine
- Solar power in Hawaii
- Sony Open in Hawaii
- Sovereignty movement in Hawaiʻi
- Sovereignty Restoration Day
- Spanish immigration to Hawaii
- Sports in Hawaii
  - commons:Category:Sports in Hawaii
- Sports venues in Hawaii
  - commons:Category:Sports venues in Hawaii
- Spreckelsville, Hawaii
- St. Benedict's Catholic Church (Honaunau, Hawaii)
- Star of the Sea Painted Church
- State Flag
- State legislature
- State of Hawaiʻi
  - Government of the State of Hawaii
  - Government of the State of Hawaii
    - Category:Government of Hawaii
      - commons:Category:Government of Hawaii
- St. Anthony High School (Wailuku, Hawaii)
- St. Joseph High School (Hilo, Hawaii)
- St. Michael the Archangel Church (Kailua-Kona, Hawaii)
- Stan Sheriff Center
- State of Hawaii Department of the Attorney General
- Statehood Day (Hawaii)
- Straub Medical Center
- Structures in Hawaiʻi
  - commons:Category: Buildings and structures in Hawaii
- Subaru Telescope
- Submillimeter Array
- Submillimetre Common-User Bolometer Array
- Sugar plantations in Hawaii
- Suiko Seamount
- Sunset Beach (Oahu)
- Supreme Court of Hawaii
- Symbols of the State of Hawaiʻi

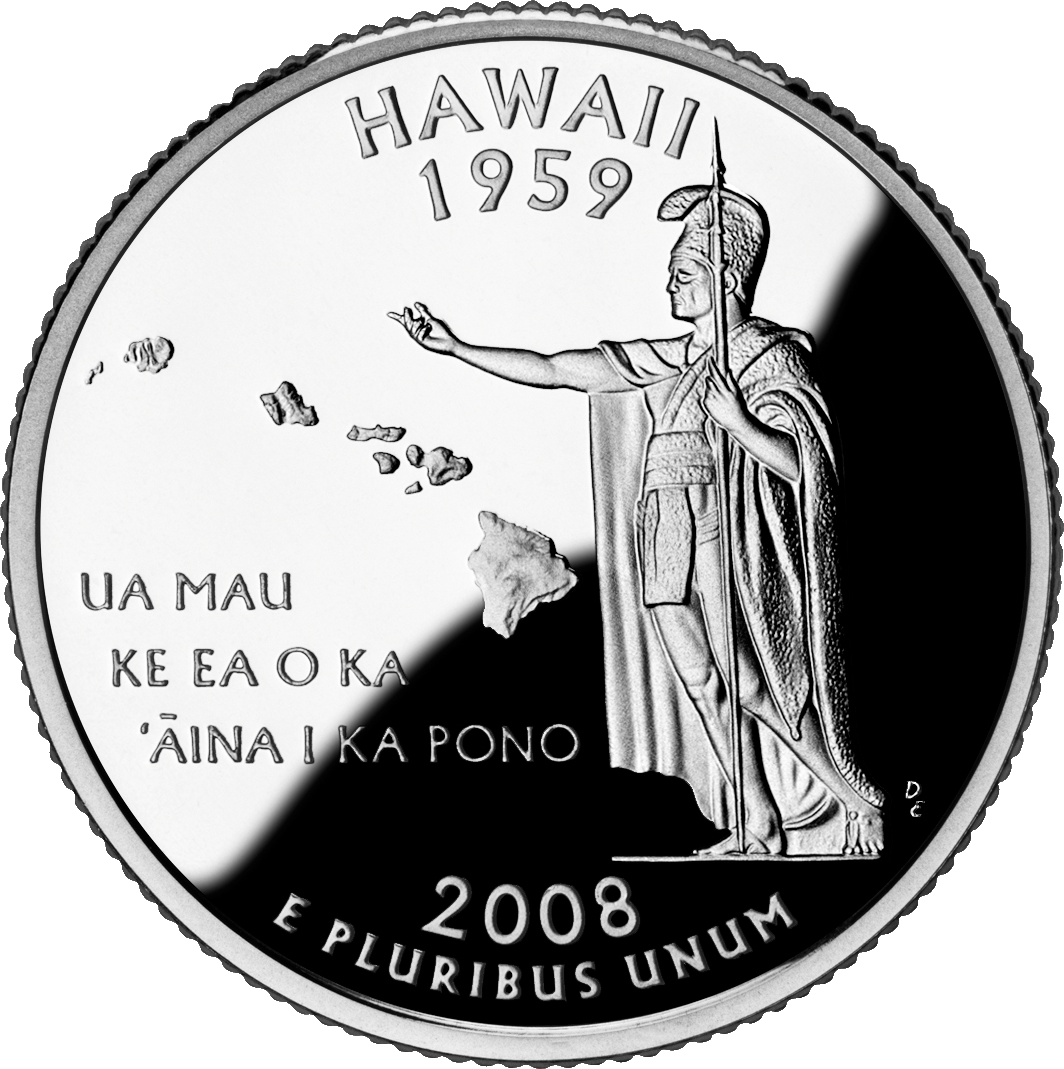
United States quarter dollar – Hawaii 2008

  - Hawaiʻi state bird: Nēnē (Branta sandvicensis)
  - Hawaiʻi state dance: Hula
  - Hawaiʻi state fish: Humuhumunukunukuāpuaʻa (Rhinecanthus rectangulus)
  - Hawaiʻi state flag: Flag of the State of Hawaiʻi
  - Hawaiʻi state flower: Maʻo hau hele (Hibiscus brackenridgei)
  - Hawaiʻi state food: Coconut muffin (unofficial)
  - Hawaiʻi state gem: Black coral
  - Hawaiʻi state individual sport: Surfing
  - Hawaiʻi state language: Hawaiian language
  - Hawaiʻi state mammal: Hawaiian monk seal (Monachus schauinslandi)
  - Hawaiʻi state marine mammal: Humpback whale (Megaptera novaeangliae)
  - Hawaiʻi state nickname: Aloha State
  - Hawaiʻi state reptile: Gold dust day gecko (Phelsuma laticauda laticauda) (unofficial)
  - Hawaiʻi state seal: Great Seal of the State of Hawaiʻi
  - Hawaiʻi state slogan: The Islands of Aloha
  - Hawaiʻi state soil: Hilo Soil (unofficial)
  - Hawaiʻi state song: "Hawai`i Pono`i"
  - Hawaiʻi state spirit: Aloha
  - Hawaiʻi state team sport: Outrigger canoe racing
  - Hawaiʻi state tartan: Hawaii State Tartan (unofficial)
  - Hawaiʻi state tree: Kukui tree (Aleurites moluccanus)

== T ==
- Tantalus (Oahu)
- Team Hawaii
- Telephone area codes in Hawaiʻi
- Temple Emanu-El (Honolulu, Hawaii)
- Tern Island (Hawaii)
- Territory of Hawaii, 1898–1959
- Tetsuo Harano Tunnels
- Theatres in Hawaiʻi
  - commons:Category:Theatres in Hawaii
- TheBus
- Thirty Meter Telescope
- Thirty Meter Telescope protests
- Thomas Square
- Thrum's Hawaiian Annual
- Time in Hawaii
- Timeline of Honolulu
- Toast Hawaii
- Tobacco MSA (Hawaii)
- Tourism in Hawaii
- Trans Executive Airlines
- TransPacific Hawaii College
- Transportation in Hawaiʻi
  - Category:Transportation in Hawaii
    - commons:Category:Transport in Hawaii
- Tripler Army Medical Center
- Tropical Gardens of Maui
- Trump International Hotel and Tower (Honolulu)
- Turtle Bay Championship
- Turtle Bay Resort
- ʻUpolu Airport

== U ==
- Ua Mau ke Ea o ka ʻĀina i ka Pono
- UH88
- Ukulele (ʻukulele)
- Ukupanipo
- Ulukau: The Hawaiian Electronic Library
- Ulupaʻu Crater
- Ulupō Heiau State Historic Site
- Ulupono Initiative
- Unification of Hawaii
- United States of America
  - States of the United States of America
  - United States Attorney for the District of Hawaii
  - United States census statistical areas of Hawaiʻi
  - Hawaii's congressional delegations
  - Hawaii's congressional districts
- United Kingdom Infrared Telescope
  - United States Court of Appeals for the Ninth Circuit
  - United States District Court for the District of Hawaiʻi
  - United States federal recognition of Native Hawaiians
  - United States House of Representatives elections in Hawaii, 2000
  - United States House of Representatives elections in Hawaii, 2002
  - United States House of Representatives elections in Hawaii, 2004
  - United States House of Representatives elections in Hawaii, 2006
  - United States House of Representatives elections in Hawaii, 2008
  - United States House of Representatives elections in Hawaii, 2010
  - United States House of Representatives elections in Hawaii, 2012
  - United States House of Representatives elections in Hawaii, 2014
  - United States House of Representatives elections in Hawaii, 2016
  - United States Immigration Office (Honolulu, Hawaii)
  - United States Minister to Hawaii
  - United States presidential elections in Hawaii
  - United States presidential election in Hawaii, 1960
  - United States presidential election in Hawaii, 1964
  - United States presidential election in Hawaii, 1968
  - United States presidential election in Hawaii, 1972
  - United States presidential election in Hawaii, 1976
  - United States presidential election in Hawaii, 1980
  - United States presidential election in Hawaii, 1984
  - United States presidential election in Hawaii, 1988
  - United States presidential election in Hawaii, 1992
  - United States presidential election in Hawaii, 1996
  - United States presidential election in Hawaii, 2000
  - United States presidential election in Hawaii, 2004
  - United States presidential election in Hawaii, 2008
  - United States presidential election in Hawaii, 2012
  - United States presidential election in Hawaii, 2016
  - United States representatives from Hawaiʻi
  - United States senators from Hawaiʻi
  - United States Senate election in Hawaii, 1976
  - United States Senate election in Hawaii, 1982
  - United States Senate election in Hawaii, 1986
  - United States Senate election in Hawaii, 1988
  - United States Senate special election in Hawaii, 1990
  - United States Senate election in Hawaii, 1992
  - United States Senate election in Hawaii, 1994
  - United States Senate election in Hawaii, 1998
  - United States Senate election in Hawaii, 2000
  - United States Senate election in Hawaii, 2004
  - United States Senate election in Hawaii, 2006
  - United States Senate election in Hawaii, 2008
  - United States Senate election in Hawaii, 2010
  - United States Senate election in Hawaii, 2012
  - United States Senate special election in Hawaii, 2014
  - United States Senate election in Hawaii, 2016
  - United States Senate election in Hawaii, 2018
- University of Hawaiʻi
  - University of Hawaii alumni
  - University of Hawaii faculty
- University of Hawaiʻi at Hilo
- University of Hawaiʻi at Hilo Botanical Gardens
- University of Hawaii Board of Publications
- University of Hawaii Marching Band
- University of Hawaiʻi Maui College
- University of Hawaiʻi Press
- University of Hawaiʻi at West Oʻahu
- U.S. Army Museum of Hawaii
- US-HI – ISO 3166-2:US region code for the State of Hawaiʻi
- USS Arizona Memorial
- USS Missouri Museum

== V ==
- Valley of the Temples Memorial Park
- Vehicle registration plates of Hawaii
- Village Park, Hawaii
- Violet Lake
- Vintage Cave Club
- Volcano, Hawaii
- Volcano Block Building
- Volcano House
- Volcano Winery
- Volcanoes National Park

== W ==
- W. H. Shipman House
- W. M. Keck Observatory
- Wahiawa
- Wahiawa Botanical Garden
- Wākea
- Waiakea
- Waiakea High School
- Waiakea Mission Station-Hilo Station
- Waialae
- Waialae Country Club
- Waialua, Hawaii
- Waialua High and Intermediate School
- Waialua Sugar Mill
- Waianae, Hawaii
- Waianae High School
- Waianae Range
- Waiʻanapanapa State Park
- Waihee-Waiehu, Hawaii
- Waihilau Falls
- Waikapu, Hawaii
- Waikīkī
- Waikīkī Aquarium
- Waikīkī Beach
- Waikiki BeachBoys
- Waikiki Natatorium War Memorial
- Waikoloa Beach
- Waikoloa Championships
- Waikoloa Village, Hawaii
- Waikolu, Hawaii
- Wailau
- Wailea, Hawaii
- Wailea-Makena, Hawaii
- Wailoa River State Recreation Area
- Wailua
- Wailua Falls
- Wailuā Homesteads, Hawaii
- Wailua, Maui County, Hawaii
- Wailua River
- Wailua River State Park
- Wailua Valley State Wayside Park
- Wailuku, Hawaii
- Wailuku Civic Center Historic District
- Wailuku River
- Waimalu, Hawaii
- Waimānalo
- Waimanalo Beach, Hawaii
- Waimanu Valley
- Waimea Bay, Hawaii
- Waimea High School
- Waimea Canyon State Park
- Waimea, Hawaii County, Hawaii
- Waimea, Kauai County, Hawaii
- Waimea-Kohala Airport
- Waimea River (Kauaʻi)
- Waimea River (Hawaiʻi)
- Waimea Valley
- Wainaku, Hawaii
- Wainiha, Hawaii
- Waiohinu, Hawaii
- Waiola Church
- Waioli Mission District
- Waipahu High School
- Waipio, Hawaii
- Waipiʻo Acres, Hawaiʻi
- Waipio Peninsula Soccer Stadium
- Waipio Valley
- Wananalua Congregational Church
- Wao Kele o Puna
- War Memorial Stadium (Hawaii)
- Washington Place
- Water parks in Hawaiʻi
- Waterfalls of Hawaiʻi
  - commons:Category:Waterfalls of Hawaii
- Weinberg Foundation
- Welaahilaninui
- West Hawaii Explorations Academy
- West Loch Estate, Hawaii
- West Maui Mountains
- West Molokaʻi Volcano
- Wet'n'Wild Hawaii
- West Hawaii Today
- Wheeler Army Airfield
- Whitmore Village, Hawaii
- Wiki Wiki Shuttle
- Wilcox Medical Center
- Wilcox rebellion of 1889
- Wilcox rebellions
- William S. Richardson School of Law
- Wind power in Hawaii
- Windward Community College
- Windward Viaducts
- Wo Hing Society Hall
- World War II Valor in the Pacific National Monument
- Wikimedia
  - Wikimedia Commons:Category:Hawaii
    - commons:Category:Maps of Hawaii
  - Wikinews:Category:Hawaii
    - Wikinews:Portal:Hawaii
  - Wikipedia Category:Hawaii
    - Wikipedia Portal:Hawaii
    - Wikipedia:WikiProject Hawaii
      - Category:WikiProject Hawaii articles
      - Category:WikiProject Hawaii participants

== Y ==
- Yellow hibiscus (state flower)
- Yomei Seamount
- Youth Speaks Hawaii
- Yuryaku Seamount
- YWCA Building (Honolulu, Hawaii)

== Z ==
- Zippy's
- Zoos in Hawaiʻi
  - commons:Category:Zoos in Hawaii

== Lists ==
- Lists related to the State of Hawaiʻi:
  - List of airlines of Hawaii
  - List of airports in Hawaii
  - List of artists who sculpted Hawaii and its people
  - List of beaches in Hawaii
  - List of birds of Hawaii
  - List of botanical gardens and arboretums in Hawaii
  - List of breweries in Hawaii
  - List of census statistical areas in Hawaiʻi
  - List of cities in Hawaiʻi
  - List of colleges and universities in Hawaiʻi
  - List of Hawaiian composers
  - List of counties in Hawaiʻi
  - List of dams and reservoirs in Hawaii
  - List of earthquakes in Hawaii
  - List of endemic birds of Hawaii
  - List of English words of Hawaiian origin
  - List of extinct animals of the Hawaiian Islands
  - List of figures in the Hawaiian religion
  - List of films set in Hawaiʻi
  - List of fish of Hawaii
  - List of flora of Nīhoa
  - List of forts in Hawaiʻi
  - List of geographical places in Hawaiʻi
  - List of ghost towns in Hawaiʻi
  - List of governors of Hawaii
  - List of Hawaii area codes
  - List of Hawaii hurricanes
  - List of Hawaii politicians
  - List of Hawaii railroads
  - List of Hawaiian royal residences
  - List of Hawaii state highways
  - List of Hawaii state parks
  - List of Hawaii state prisons
  - List of Hawaii state symbols
  - List of Hawaii tornadoes
  - List of Hawaiian composers
  - List of Hawaiian consorts
  - List of Hawaiian dishes
  - List of Hawaiʻi's congressional delegations
  - List of Hawaiʻi's congressional districts
  - List of high schools in Hawaii
  - List of hospitals in Hawaii
  - List of invasive plant species in Hawaii
  - List of islands of Hawaiʻi
  - List of justices of the Supreme Court of Hawaii
  - List of law enforcement agencies in Hawaii
  - List of Lepidoptera of Hawaii
  - List of lighthouses in Hawaii
  - List of Living Treasures of Hawaii
  - List of monarchs of Hawaii
  - List of mountain passes in Hawaii
  - List of mountain peaks of Hawaii
  - List of museums in Hawaii
  - List of National Historic Landmarks in Hawaii
  - List of National Natural Landmarks in Hawaii
  - List of newspapers in Hawaii
  - List of people from Hawaii
  - List of people on the postage stamps of Hawaii
  - List of power stations in Hawaii
  - List of places in Hawaii
  - List of radio stations in Hawaii
  - List of Registered Historic Places in Hawaii
  - List of restaurants in Hawaii
  - List of rivers in Hawaii
  - List of school districts in Hawaii
  - List of state highways in Hawaii
  - List of television stations in Hawaiʻi
  - List of tallest buildings in Honolulu
  - List of United States Army bases in Hawaiʻi
  - List of United States representatives from Hawaiʻi
  - List of United States senators from Hawaiʻi
  - List of volcanoes in the Hawaiian – Emperor seamount chain

== See also ==
- Topic overview:
  - Hawaii
  - Outline of Hawaii
