= Hawaii Technology Institute =

- Motto: Educate, Empower, Excel
- Type: Vocational School, Non-Profit
- President: Naomi Digitaki
- Location: Honolulu, Hawaii, Hawaii, U.S.A.
- Campus: Urban
- Website: Hawaii Technology Institute

Hawaiʻi Technology Institute was a non-profit, vocational school located in Honolulu, Hawaii. It has been licensed by the State of Hawaii Department of Education as a private trade, vocational, and technical school.

Conceived as a job-training center in Honolulu, it was formed in 1986 through a partnership between Alu Like, Inc. and IBM Corporation. The school initially offered job readiness training in Computer Literacy and Job Readiness Skills.

In 2007, HTI provided healthcare certification training for Native Hawaiians with interest in becoming certified as Clinical Medical Assistants, Pharmacy Technicians, EKG Technicians, and Phlebotomy Technicians. Certifications were sanctioned by the National Healthcareer Association.

Hawaiʻi Technology Institute closed its doors in 2018. It was last located at 1130 North Nimitz Highway, Suite A-226, Honolulu, Hawaii.
