= List of dams and reservoirs in Hawaii =

Following is a list of dams and reservoirs in Hawaii.

All major dams are linked below. The National Inventory of Dams defines any "major dam" as being 50 feet (15 m) tall with a storage capacity of at least 5,000 acre-feet (6,200,000 m^{3}), or of any height with a storage capacity of 25,000 acre-feet (31,000,000 m^{3}).

== Dams and reservoirs in Hawaii ==
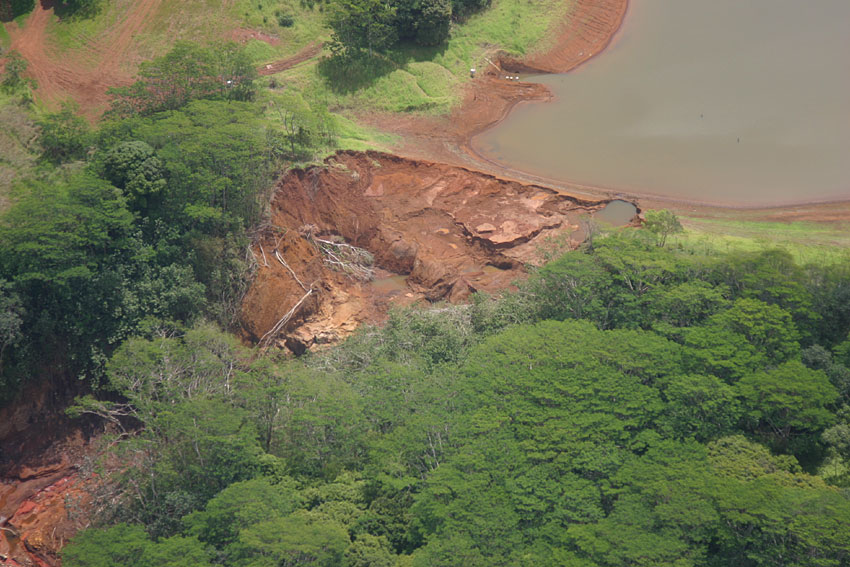
Ka Loko Dam breached, 2006

This list is incomplete. You can help Wikipedia by expanding it.

- Ka Loko Dam, Ka Loko Reservoir, privately owned (failed)
- Kualapuu Dam, Kualapuu Reservoir, State of Hawaii
- Wahiawa Dam, Wilson Reservoir
