= John Baptist de Faria =

John Baptist de Faria was born in 1871, in Portugal. He graduated from the School of Medicine and Surgery, Lisbon, 1896, and interned at the Maternity and Hospital for Women . Following his hospital work there, he served on the staffs of civil and military hospitals in the Portuguese possessions of Cape Verde and Guinea in Africa. Later he went to the United States with his wife and children and settled in New Bedford, Massachusetts.

In 1902 Dr. de Faria arrived in Honolulu and was licensed to practice in September of that year. His office and residence were located on Alakea Street; and he specialized in obstetrics and women.

== Controversy ==
Within a few days of being licensed, Dr. de Faria was implicated by a fellow physician in a romantic tangle, which surely must have been the talk of Honolulu. Dr. Luiz Alvarez, Spanish-born physician, brought a clipping from the Independente, a Portuguese newspaper published in New Bedford, to the office of the Advertiser to call attention to an article about a Dr. Faria who, leaving his wife and children, had run away with Mrs. Sanders, who also took her husband's savings when she left. Dr. Alvarez claimed that Dr. de Faria practicing medicine in Honolulu and the Dr. Faria of the newspaper article were one and the same, and the story appeared, together with Dr. Alvarez's accusations, on September 26, 1902.

On the following day a letter from Dr. de Faria was published in the Advertiser in which he denied that he was running away or trying to hide his identity and accused Dr. Alvarez of professional jealousy because he had refused to enter into a partnership with Alvarez. However, he did not deny running away with another man's wife, merely stating that he would take up that matter when the sheriff came to get him. A few days later the Advertiser carried Dr. Alvarez's rebuttal to Dr. de Faria's letter in which he countered that he could hardly have thought of offering a partnership to a man he did not know. He also contended that Dr. de Faria did not use his own name on arriving in Honolulu and brought no character references with him, in spite of knowing that he would have to produce such references in order to be granted a license to practice medicine. He further accused Dr. de Faria of giving Alvarez's name to the Board of Health as a character reference without his knowledge or consent. With this, the verbal sparring between the medicos comes to an end - at least in the pages of the Advertiser.

However, there is an amazing sequel to this affair of the heart, which is recounted in the Advertiser for March 26, 1903, under a New Bedford dateline. The story describes how Mrs. de Faria sent her four children to Portugal and then set out with only $100 to search for her husband. Eventually, she found herself in San Francisco where the trail ended. While working at odd jobs in the hopes that some clue would turn up, Mrs. de Faria happened to pick up a Honolulu newspaper, and, in turning through the pages, came across Dr. de Faria's business card. Her meager savings were just enough to pay her passage to Honolulu. On her arrival, her sudden appearance and the tale of her untiring search so moved her husband that the two were reunited. According to the story, the reunion was further helped by the fact that the romance between the doctor and Mrs. Sanders was cooling due to the lady's interest in a young Army officer. In any event, the tale ends with the doctor and his wife departing secretly for Portugal "never to return" and leaving Mrs. Sanders deserted and without funds in Honolulu.

== Return ==
Whether or not Dr. de Faria went to Portugal in 1903 is not known, but he is listed as president of the articles of association ,filed in October, 1903, in Honolulu, of the Libeadade Publishing Company,Ltd. Certainly, he had returned to Honolulu and was in practice by 1904 when he became a member of the Hawaiian Territorial Medical Society. During his years in Honolulu he was the originator and chief promoter of A Pátria, a Portuguese society whose objects were financial benefit, social intercourse, and the education of its members.

Leaving the Islands in August, 1905, the doctor set out on the first leg of a trip which was to take him to Portugal, France and Germany to study and visit medical institutions. On his return he located in Oakland, California, where he practiced for a number of years. The 1923 Medical Directory lists him as still living in Oakland, but after that he is not listed and nothing further is known about him.
