= University of Hawaii Marching Band =

College marching band in Honolulu

University of Hawaiʻi Marching Band
- School: University of Hawaiʻi at Mānoa
- Location: Honolulu, HI
- Conference: Mountain West
- Founded: 1923
- Director: Dr. Thomas Kloss
- Members: 250
- Website: www.uhbands.org

The University of Hawaiʻi Rainbow Warrior Marching Band is a marching band for the University of Hawaiʻi at Mānoa.

== History ==
The first band at the University of Hawaiʻi at Mānoa was established in 1923. The only university marching band in the state of Hawaii and the biggest student organization on campus performs pregame and halftime at all the Hawaiʻi Warriors football home games at the Clarence T.C. Ching Athletics Complex, including bowl games, as well as pep band at home games for basketball and volleyball.

The band celebrated their 100th anniversary in 2023 with brand new uniforms debuted at their season opener football game against Stanford.

== General information ==
The UH marching band consists of over 200 members. Under the direction of Dr. Thomas Kloss and Assistant Band Director Gwen Nakamura, it is considered a one-credit graded course at the University of Hawaiʻi at Mānoa. Students enrolled receive a tuition waiver, with rehearsals three days a week. The band played at the 2008 Sugar Bowl.

Instrumentation includes flutes and piccolos, clarinets, alto/tenor saxophones, French horns, trumpets, trombones, baritones, tubas, percussion and color guard.
