= Kauai County Fair =

Traditional annual fair in Līhuʻe, Hawaii

Coordinates: 21.9730°N 159.3552°W

Kauai County Fair, or Kauai County Farm Fair, is a fair held annually in Līhuʻe, Hawaii, traditionally the largest Hawaiian fair of the year. It is usually held in August, though in part of the 20th century it was held in April.

Frank Sinatra appeared at the Kauai County Fair in April 1952 at a time, when his career had severely declined. It was raining at the time and the dilapidated tent he was in leaked during his first performance.
