= Puaʻa-2 Agricultural Fields Archeological District =

- Puaʻa-2 Agricultural Fields Archeological District (50HA10229)
- U.S. National Register of Historic Places
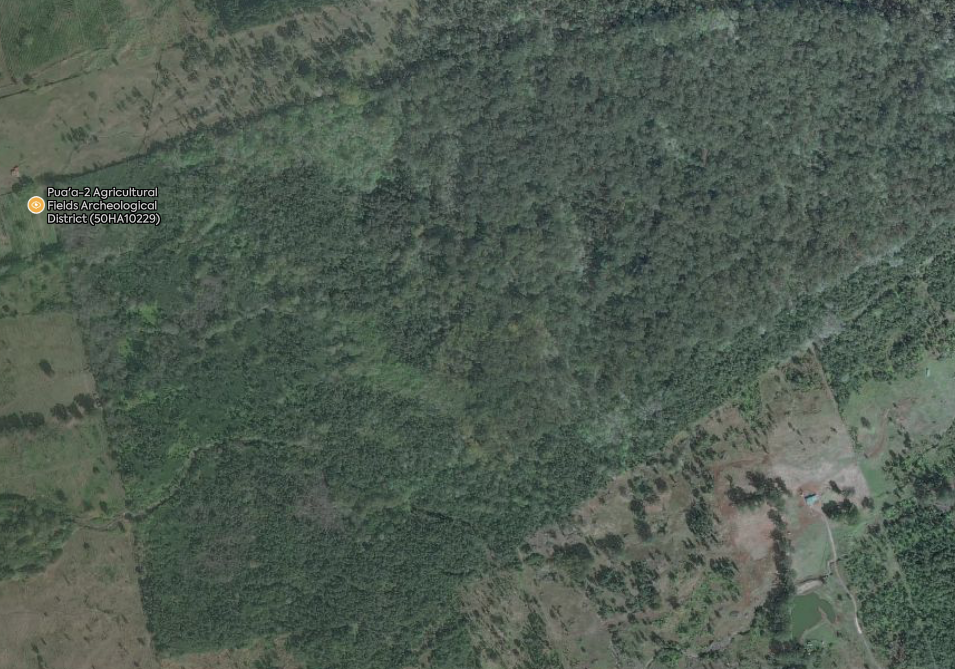

- Location within Hawaii
- Location: Central Hawaiʻi Island
- Coordinates: 19°38′25″N 155°56′30″W
- Area: 4.6 acres (19,000 m^{2})
- Built: 1000-1449
- Architectural style: Ancient Hawaiian
- NRHP reference No.: 86002804
- Added to NRHP: October 14, 1986

Puaʻa-2 Agricultural Fields Archeological District is a historic site of Ancient Hawaii agriculture on the Big Island of Hawaiʻi.

== The site ==
Coordinates are approximate; it is within the Ahupuaʻa of Puaʻa 2, on a 35-acre (140,000 m^{2}) Kona coffee farm known as Ariana Farms ʻOno Coffee. A 1985 survey found several stone platforms, several agricultural terraces, and a 50 by 100-foot (30 m) feature thought to be an agricultural heiau.

The site is state archaeological site number 10-28-10,229 (the last part of this site designation, plus "50HA" to indicate the state of Hawaii, was appended to its name on the National registry). It was added to the National Register of Historic Places on October 14, 1986, as site number 86002804.

== Severe damage in 2000 ==
The site was damaged and possibly destroyed in 2000 when a permit was mistakenly given to clear the area for planting coffee. The State Historic Preservation District officials approve each grading permit, but with several vacancies for archaeologists in the district, the property owners were not aware of any site on their property.
