= Hawaii State Federal Credit Union =

- Company type: Credit union
- Industry: Financial services
- Founded: 1936
- Headquarters: Honolulu, Hawaii, United States
- Key people: Andrew Rosen (CEO)
- Products: Savings; checking; consumer loans; mortgages; credit cards
- Total assets: $2.3B USD (As of January 2023)
- Number of employees: 380
- Website: hawaiistatefcu.com

Hawaii State Federal Credit Union (HSFCU) is a federally chartered credit union headquartered in Honolulu, Hawaii and regulated under the authority of the National Credit Union Administration (NCUA). HSFCU is the largest credit union in Hawaii. As of September 2013, HSFCU had $1.3 billion in assets, approximately 77,000 members, and 8 branches.

HSFCU's field of membership is open to state, city and county employees in Hawaii as well as their immediate families. Funds deposited with HSFCU are insured for up to $250,000 by the National Credit Union Share Insurance Fund and guaranteed by the NCUA.

== History ==
The Hawaii Territorial Employees' Federal Credit Union was founded on October 26, 1936, by 15 government workers. The credit union later changed its name to Hawaii State Federal Credit Union. HSFCU is a founding member of the Hawaii Credit Union League, an association of credit unions in Hawaii.

Hawaii State FCU belongs to the Hawaii Network, a shared-branch service of Hawaii credit unions. HSFCU awards scholarships to members and their children every year.
