= Halfway Bridge (Kauaʻi) =

Coordinates: 21.9619°N 159.4422°W

Halfway Bridge, also known as Huleʻia Bridge, is located on Kauaʻi, Hawaii, where Kaumualiʻi Highway Highway crosses over Huleia Stream. Its name derives from its location about halfway between the towns of Lihue and Koloa.

== History ==
The first Halfway Bridge was erected in 1856 from wood. It was replaced in 1919 by a one-lane cement bridge. That bridge was replaced by two-lane bridge in 1927. The current bridge opened in 1989.
