= Our Lady Queen of Angels Catholic Church (Kula, Hawaii) =

- Our Lady Queen of Angels Catholic Church
- 20°42′19.64″N 156°21′18.54″W
- Address: 9177 Kula Highway, Keokea, Hawaii
- Country: USA
- Denomination: Roman Catholic

History
- Founded: 1936
- Dedicated: December 8, 1940

Administration
- Diocese: Diocese of Honolulu

Our Lady Queen of Angels Catholic Church in Kula is a parish of the Catholic Church of Hawaii in the United States. Located in Kula on the island of Maui, the church falls under the jurisdiction of the Diocese of Honolulu. It is named after a title of the Blessed Virgin Mary.

== See also ==
- Apostolic Prefecture of the Sandwich Islands
