= John Guild House =

Historic house in Hawaii, United States

- U.S. National Register of Historic Places
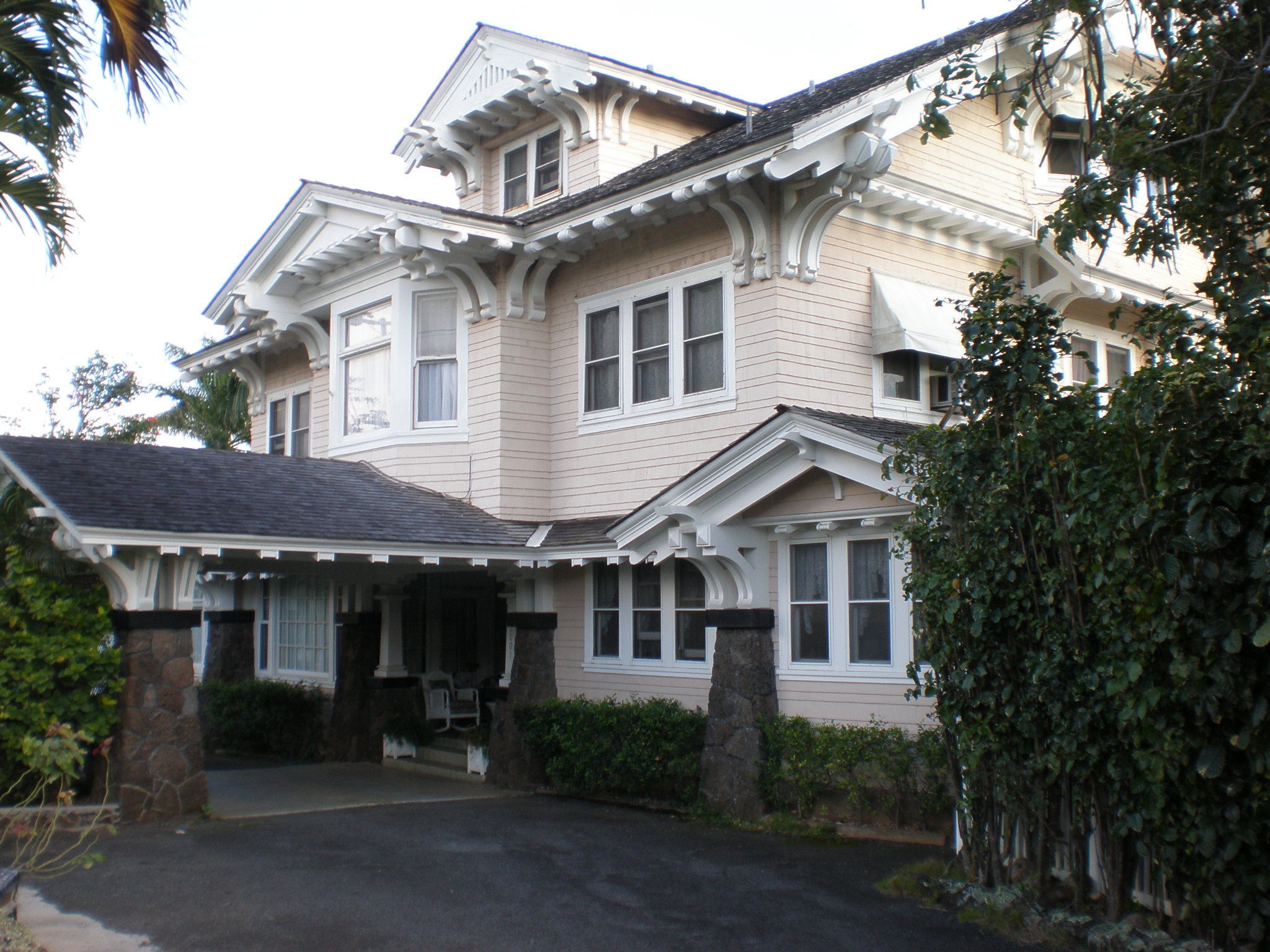
- Manoa Valley Inn in 2009

- Location within Hawaii
- Location: 2001 Vancouver Dr., Honolulu, Hawaii
- Coordinates: 21°18′20″N 157°49′30″W
- Area: 0.5 acres (0.20 ha)
- Built: 1915
- NRHP reference No.: 80001275
- Added to NRHP: August 1, 1980

The John Guild House, now known as Manoa Valley Inn, at 2001 Vancouver Drive in Honolulu, Hawaii, was purchased in 1919 by John Guild, a Honolulu businessman. It had been built four years earlier by Iowa lumber dealer Milton Moore and has been refurbished and restored several times over its lifespan. It was listed on the National Register of Historic Places in 2002.

The house was purchased in the 1980s by Honolulu businessman Rick Ralston (the founder of Crazy Shirts), who restored it in 1982 for use as a bed and breakfast under the name John Guild Inn, later Manoa Valley Inn, the name under which it still operates. In 1990, the Nakamitsu Corporation purchased and further refurbished it.

The three-story gabled cottage near the campus of the University of Hawaii at Manoa contains eight guest rooms furnished with fine antiques. Among its architectural features are multiple extended gables with decorative buttresses, a porte-cochere in the same style on the valley side of the house, and a broad, sheltered lanai with a view over the city on the sea side of the house.

In 2007, the current owner and operator of the Manoa Valley Inn put it up for sale at $4.2 million for the half-acre lot and 4,424-square-foot (411.0 m^{2}) house. She decided to sell it after the external chimney was badly damaged in the earthquake of 15 October 2006. The rest of the house was undamaged.
