= Hawaiian Potters Guild =

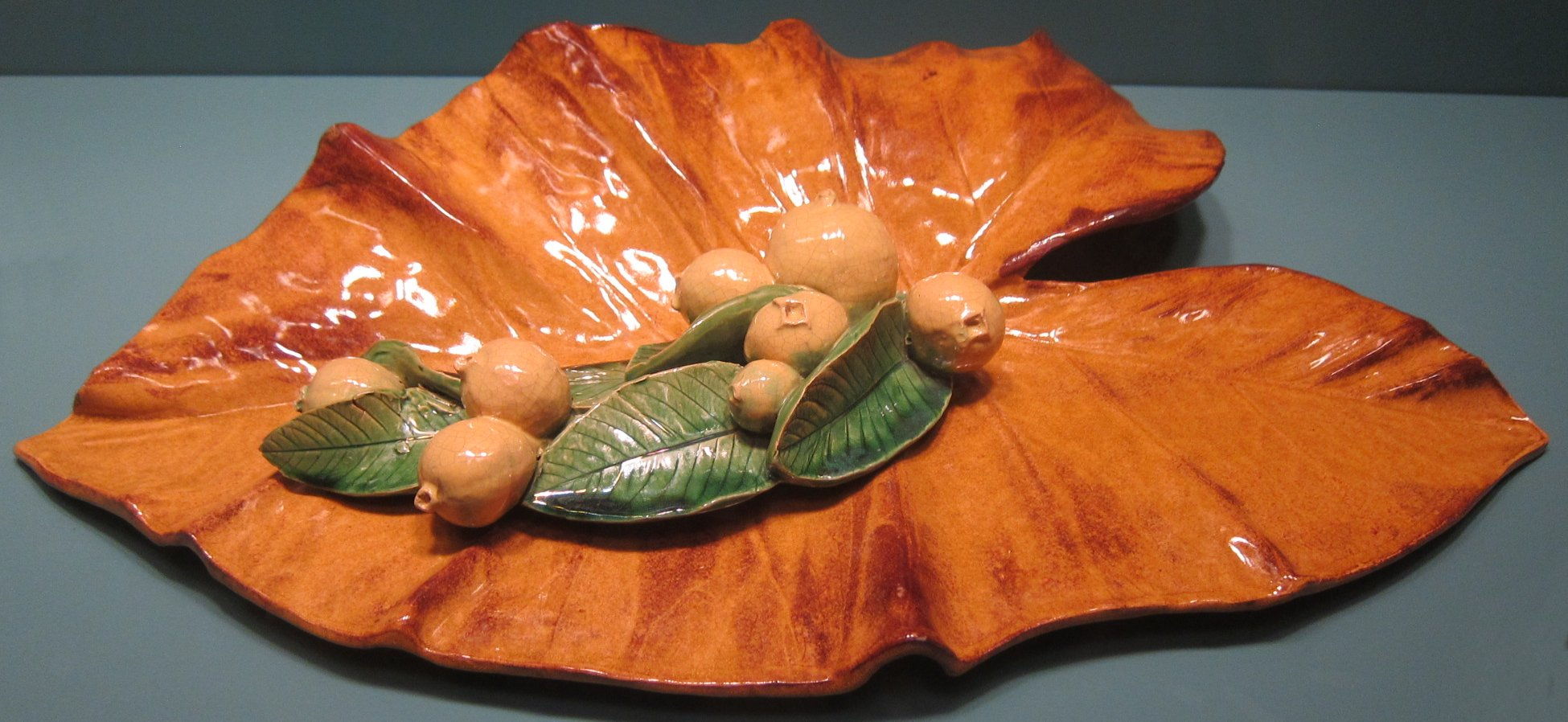
Platter in shape of taro leaf with Guava branch, Hawaiian Potters Guild, glazed earthenware, Honolulu Museum of Art

The Hawaiian Potters Guild produced handmade glazed earthenware ceramics in Honolulu, Hawaii in the 1930s and 1940s.

== Origins ==
In 1931, Sarah Wilder (Mrs. James A. Wilder), wife of the painter James Austin Wilder, began offering pottery courses at the Honolulu Museum of Art. These classes were expanded about 1937 by Mrs. Nancy Andrew. In 1935 Wilder and Andrew opened the Hawaiian Potters Guild on Upper Manoa Road. The business was purchased by Hugh and Lita Gantt in 1939 and later sold to the US Military in 1942.

Its output was mostly functional and based upon plants found in Hawaii. The guild also produced purely decorative pieces, such as the platter in shape of taro leaf with guava branch (illustrated), which was made for the luxury retailer S. & G. Gump and Company.

The Hawaiian Potters Guild should not be confused with the Hawaii Potters' Guild, which was founded in 1967 and continues today.
