= Saint Joseph Catholic Church (Makawao, Hawaii) =

Saint Joseph Catholic Church in Makawao is a parish of the Roman Catholic Church of Hawaii in the United States. Located in Makawao on the island of Maui, the church falls under the jurisdiction of the Diocese of Honolulu and its bishop. It is named after Saint Joseph, the father of Jesus.

== History ==
The church is located at 1294 Makawao Avenue, 20°51′22″N 156°18′29″W. The first church in the area was built by Father James Beissel around 1882. The next pastor was Justin Van Schayk. The current structure was built in 1911 under supervision from John Couturiaux. A tower was added in 1927 financed by the family of James Beynes.

There are several stained glass windows in Saint Joseph's church.

== School ==
St. Joseph's Church has an associated school which educates the people of this area known as "upcountry Maui". It is open to students of all religious, ethnic, economic and national backgrounds.

== Feast days ==
Saint Joseph's "Feast Days" is an annual event in upcountry Maui, and includes live entertainment, crafts, food, games, and auctions.
