= Hawaii College of Pharmacy =

Unaccredited Pharm.D. school in Hawaii, US

Coordinates: 21.3344°N 158.0815°W

The Hawaii College of Pharmacy (HICP) was an unaccredited Pharm.D. school in Hawaii owned and operated by Pacific Educational Services. After an investigation by the State of Hawaii's department for consumer protection for not following its regulations on non-accredited schools, it was shut down and its owners prohibited from running any business in Hawaii again. It is alleged that the college did not follow requirements for disclosure on not being accredited.

== Controversy ==
A Hawaiian news report noted the school "falsely assured students it would obtain accreditation and wrongly took over six (m) million dollars in tuition from some 240 students."

The Hawaii College of Pharmacy was created by David C. Monroe (aka. David Yacas) and Denise Criswell (aka Denise Nakajima).

Monroe and Criswell have been banned by the state of Hawaii from doing any business there until they pay $14 million in restitution and fines to the former 240 students. Around $1.2 million has been recovered so far.
