= A.J. Williamson House =

Historic Place in Hawaii County, Hawaii

- U.S. National Register of Historic Places
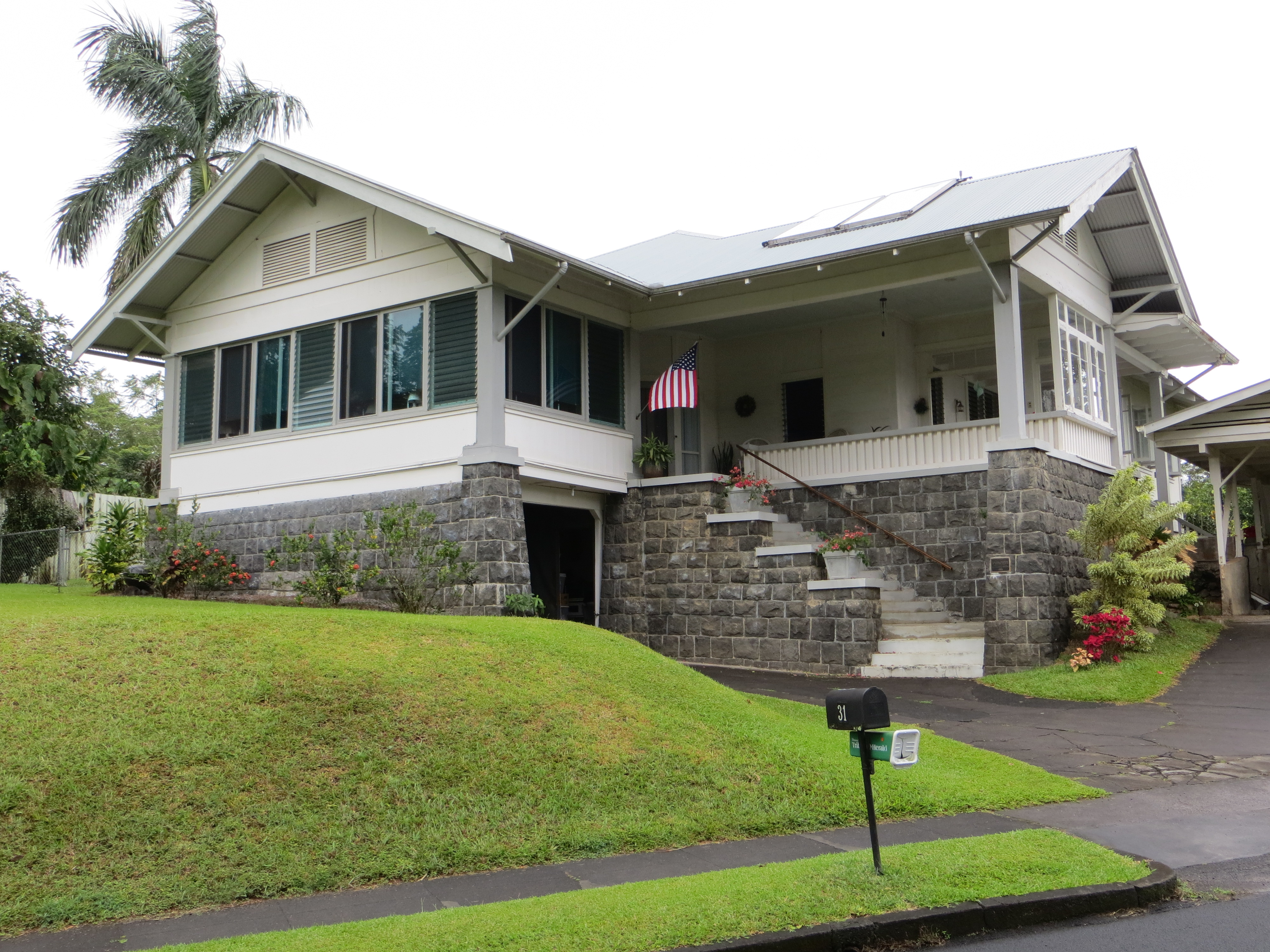

- Location within Hawaii
- Location: 31 Halaulani Pl., Hilo, Hawaii
- Coordinates: 19°44′11″N 155°5′44″W
- Area: 0.8 acres (0.32 ha)
- Built: 1921
- Architectural style: American Craftsman
- NRHP reference No.: 97000406
- Added to NRHP: May 9, 1997

The A.J. Williamson House is a historic house located at 31 Halaulani Place in Hilo, Hawaii. The house was built in 1921 for engineer A.J. Williamson. At the time, Halaulani Place was one of the most desirable neighborhoods in Hilo. The house has a Craftsman design; the style was popular in Hawaii at the time due to its emphasis on natural materials and features. The one-story house rests on a lava rock base, which is nearly a story tall itself. The corrugated metal roof features overhanging, bracketed eaves and decorative vents below its gable ends.

The house was added to the National Register of Historic Places on May 9, 1997.
