= Kukui Heiau =

- U.S. National Register of Historic Places
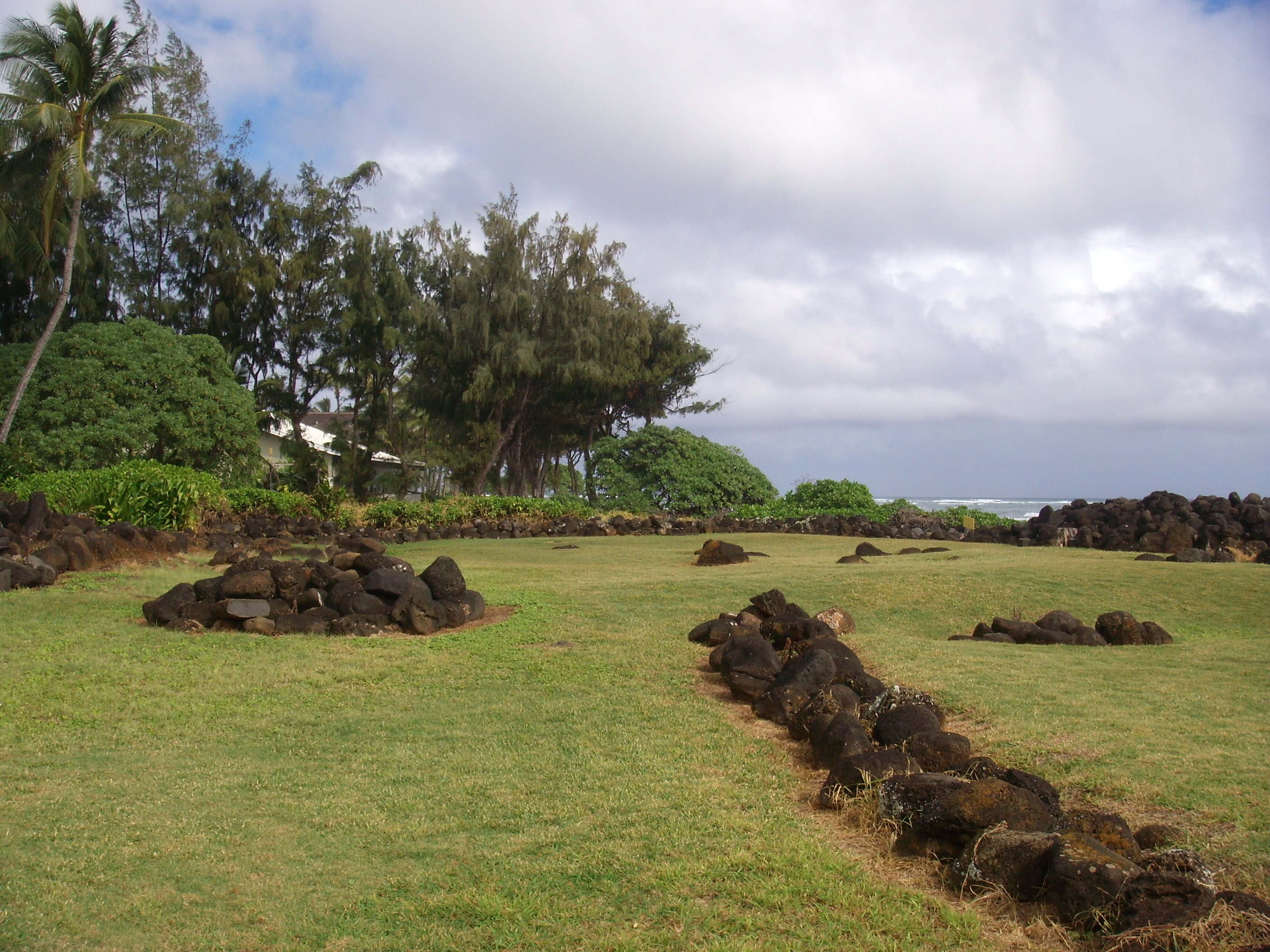

- Location within Hawaii
- Location: At Alakukui Point on north shore of Wailua Bay (accessible via public right-of-way between the Kauaʻi Sands and Lae Nani Condominium)
- Nearest city: Wailua, Hawaii
- Coordinates: 22.051235°N 159.329433°W
- Area: 1.1 acres (0.45 ha)
- NRHP reference No.: 86002746
- Added to NRHP: May 18, 1987

The Kukui Heiau, near Wailua, Hawaii, also known as ʻAʻa Kukui, is a historic archeological site that is listed on the National Register of Historic Places. It is the site of a heiau—a Hawaiian temple—on state land that was donated by neighboring condo developers. It is now landscaped, but retains facing walls and offers a good view of Wailua Bay. A 1.1 acres (0.45 ha) area was listed on the National Register of Historic Places in 1987.
