= Vintage Cave Club =

Coordinates: 21.291172°N 157.845499°W

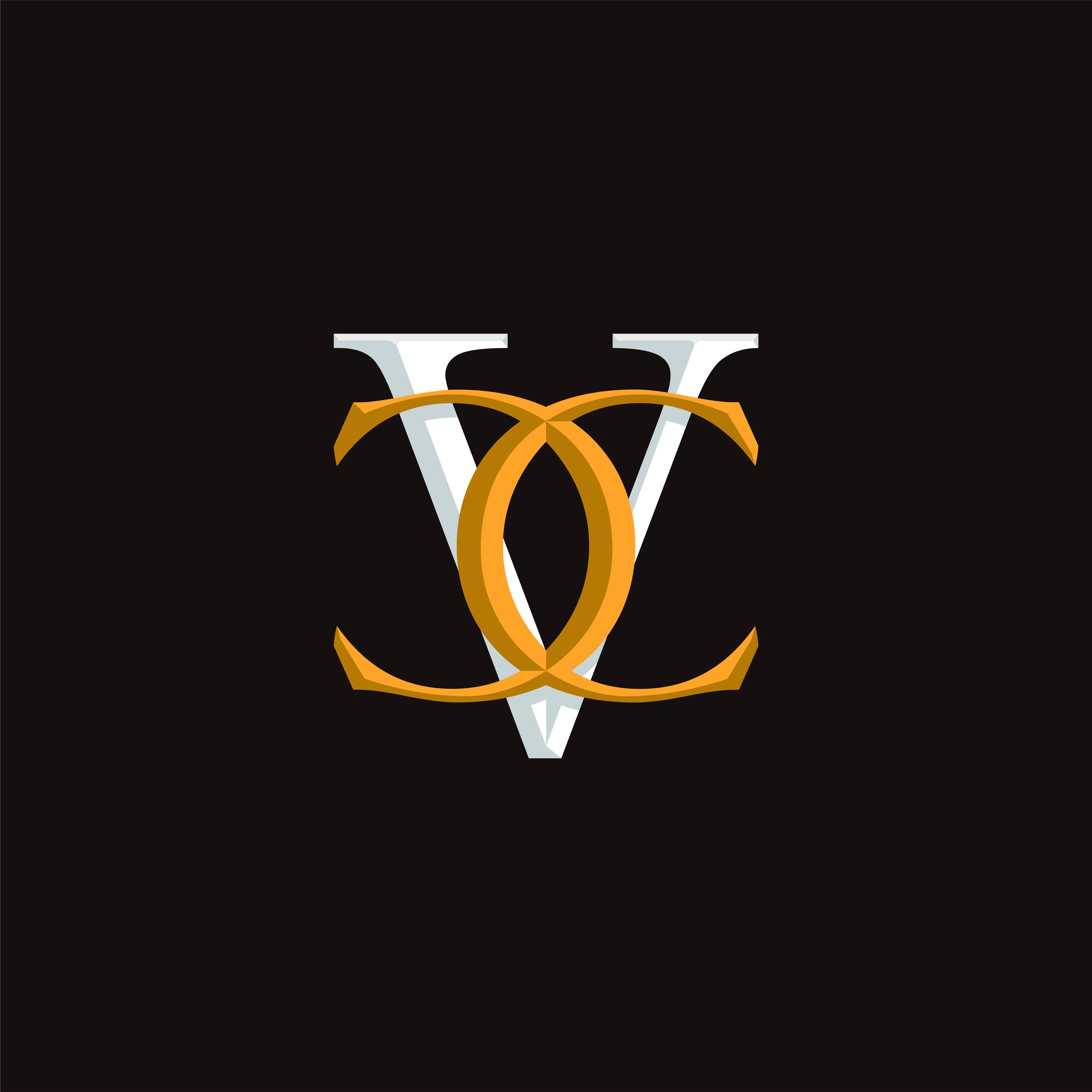
- Interactive map of Vintage Cave Club

Restaurant information
- Established: 2012
- Owner: Takeshi Sekiguchi
- Food type: French Japonais
- Dress code: Formal
- Location: Ala Moana Center, 1450 Ala Moana Blvd #2250, Honolulu, Hawaii, 96814, United States
- Seating capacity: 50
- Other locations: Vintage Cave Café
- Other information: Hideaway Guest House For Oenophiles & Connoisseurs
- Website: http://www.vintagecave.com

Vintage Cave Club (formerly known as Vintage Cave Honolulu) is a private club with a restaurant featuring a "French-Japonais" menu in the Ala Moana Center in Honolulu, Hawaii. The restaurant contains a collection of artwork that includes a lithograph series by Pablo Picasso. The restaurant is currently open to the public, but offers a private membership program that entitles access to vintage wines & access to its various facilities.

The Vintage Cave Club was listed on Zagat in 2014 as one of the twelve hottest restaurants in Hawaii, and listed by Zagat again in 2016 as one of the ten hottest restaurants in Hawaii. President Barack Obama and his family have been seen dining at the restaurant, as have other celebrities and public figures.

== History ==
According to Honolulu Magazine, the restaurant contains "150,000 imported, custom bricks that line the restaurant like a tomb, a wine-tasting dispenser that displaces air with argon gas to protect open bottles of wine, and an art collection that includes an 18-piece series of original Picassos. The art is culled from Sekiguchi’s private collection..." The Vintage Cave Club also has a members-only bar. The restaurant seats up to 50 people and is located in the Ala Moana Center in Honolulu, Hawaii.

In 2014, owner Takeshi Sekiguchi began considering global expansion, scouting locations in Beverly Hills, Las Vegas, New York City, London, Frankfurt and Dubai. In the February/March 2018 edition of Hawaii Luxury Magazine it was announced that these expansions were already underway and are expected to be completed before 2020.

In 2017, Sekiguchi appointed Chef Hidemasa Yamamoto as Head Director of Vintage Cave Club and Café. Chef Yamamoto was the first Executive Chef to serve at the Presidential inauguration ceremony of three U.S. Presidents: Ronald Reagan, George H.W. Bush, and Bill Clinton. He also served for various official banquets and parties organized by the first lady, gaining popularity in the political world in America. He earned the Mandarin Oriental Tokyo the world's first "Six Stars" by the American Academy of Hospitality Science. In 2010, he has also been awarded the "Global Chef Award" from the World Gourmet Summit - an annual epicurean festival that showcases intricate craftsmanship of prestigious chefs.

== Vintage Cave Café and Shirokiya Japan Village Walk ==
On June 25, 2016, Shirokiya opened the new Shirokiya Japan Village Walk, offering customers a unique experience showcasing a traditional Japanese town reminiscent of old Kyoto. Highlighting traditional Japanese culture, the new Shirokiya Japan Village Walk consists of four main themes: Yataimura (quality food court & beer garden featuring $1 beers), Zeppin Plaza (shopping alleys), Omatsuri Hiroba (festival and event square) and Guardian Spirits Sanctuary (good luck deities). The former Shirokiya space above the Vintage Cave Club was converted into another Ala Moana Center food court called "The Lanai."

Following the opening of the new Shirokiya Japan Village Walk, a more casual, sister restaurant of the Vintage Cave Club opened nearby called Vintage Cave Café.
