= Our Lady of Good Counsel Catholic Church (Pearl City, Hawaii) =

- Our Lady of Good Counsel Catholic Church
- 21.405505°N 157.964912°W
- Address: 1525 Waimano Home Rd., Pearl City, HI 96782
- Country: USA
- Denomination: Roman Catholic
- Website: www.olgcchurch.org

History
- Founded: 1958

Administration
- Diocese: Diocese of Honolulu

Our Lady of Good Counsel Catholic Church is a parish of the Roman Catholic Church of Hawaii in the United States. Located in Pearl City on the island of Oahu, the church falls under the jurisdiction of the Diocese of Honolulu and its bishop.

Fr. Santhosh Thottankara, ss.cc. is the current Pastor.
