= Hawaii Center for Volcanology =

US research center

Coordinates: 21°17′54.3″N 157°48′59.6″W

The Hawaii Center for Volcanology was a cooperative effort between the School of Ocean and Earth Science and Technology at the University of Hawaiʻi at Mānoa, the Hawaiian Volcano Observatory of the United States Geological Survey, and the Center for the Study of Active Volcanoes at the University of Hawaii at Hilo. The loosely organized cooperative was created in 1992 to "bring together experts from around the state of Hawaii so that we might better understand these magical mountains of fire", and consists of approximately 80 scientists. Its site is maintained by members of the School of Ocean and Earth Science and Technology staff, even though it is no longer in operation.
