= Kaulaʻināiwi Island =

Kaulaʻināiwi
- Location within Hawaii

Geography
- Location: Hilo, HI 96720
- Coordinates: 19.735011°N 155.0725°W
- Archipelago: Hawaii
- Adjacent to: North Pacific
- Total islands: 1

Administration
- United States
- State: Hawaii
- County: Hawaii
- CDP: Hilo

Kaulaʻināiwi Island is an island in Hawaii County, Hawaii.
