= Kukini =

In the Hawaiian language, kukini means "runner, swift messenger, as employed by old chiefs, with a premium on their speed."

In ancient Hawaii, Kukini were an elite class of men selected to undergo strenuous physical and mental training to become swift foot runners. Such runners were used in battles, as messengers, spies, and as athletes in foot racing in the Makahiki games. This term has become popular to use as a label for various things. For example, the shoe corporation Nike used the name Kukini for one of the models of their running shoes.

Also, Hickam Air Force Base's newsletter is named "Kukini," as is the newsletter for the University of Hawaiʻi at Mānoa Library named Ke Kukini, and GoGo eBike's Kukini electrically pedal assisted bicycle locate at GoGo Ebike, 1608 Kalakua Ave, Honolulu, HI 96826.
