= Kai Opae =

Rocky peninsula on Hawai'i

Coordinates: 20°03′40.8″N 155°50′56″W

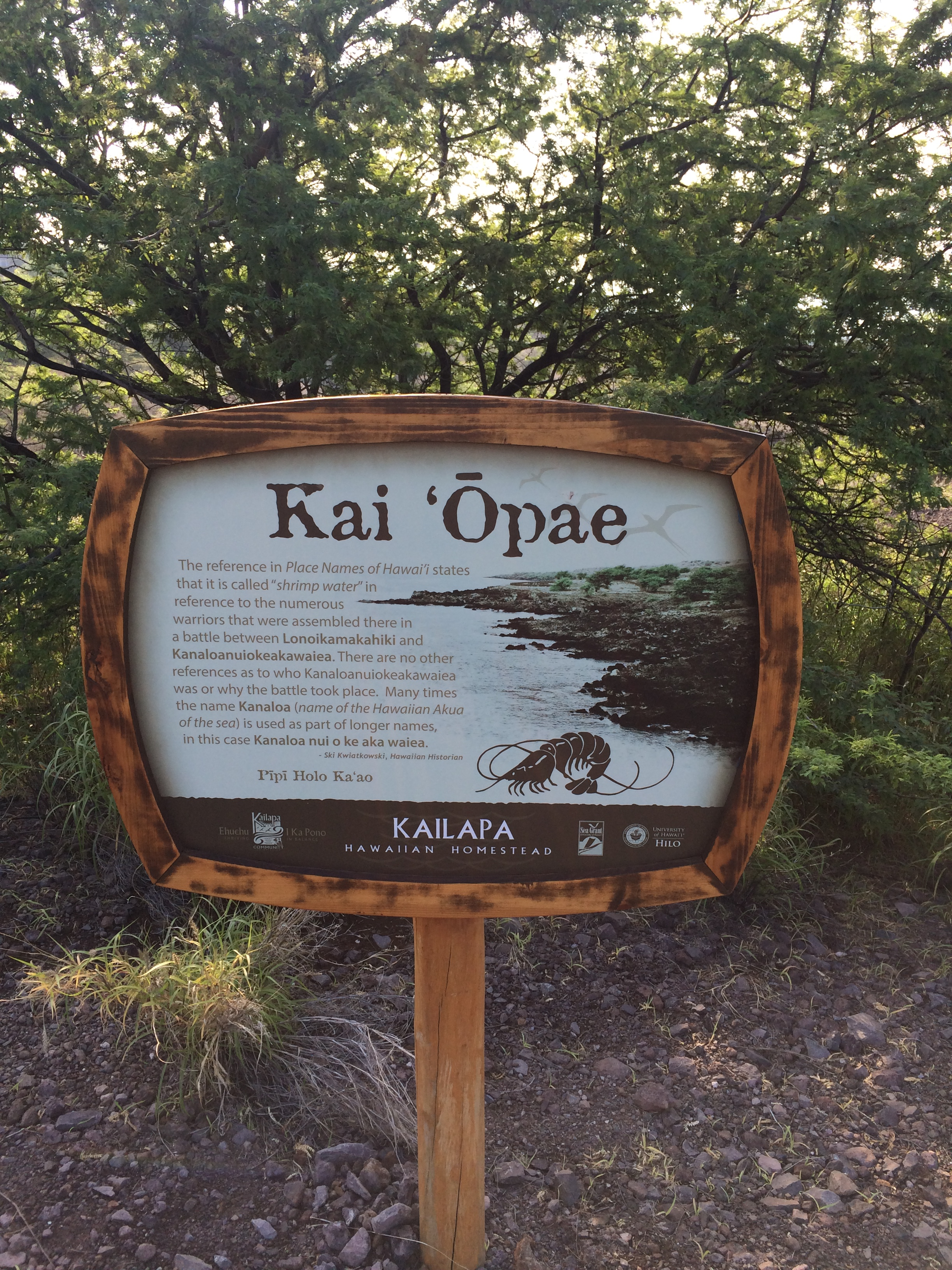
A sign detailing information on Kai Opae

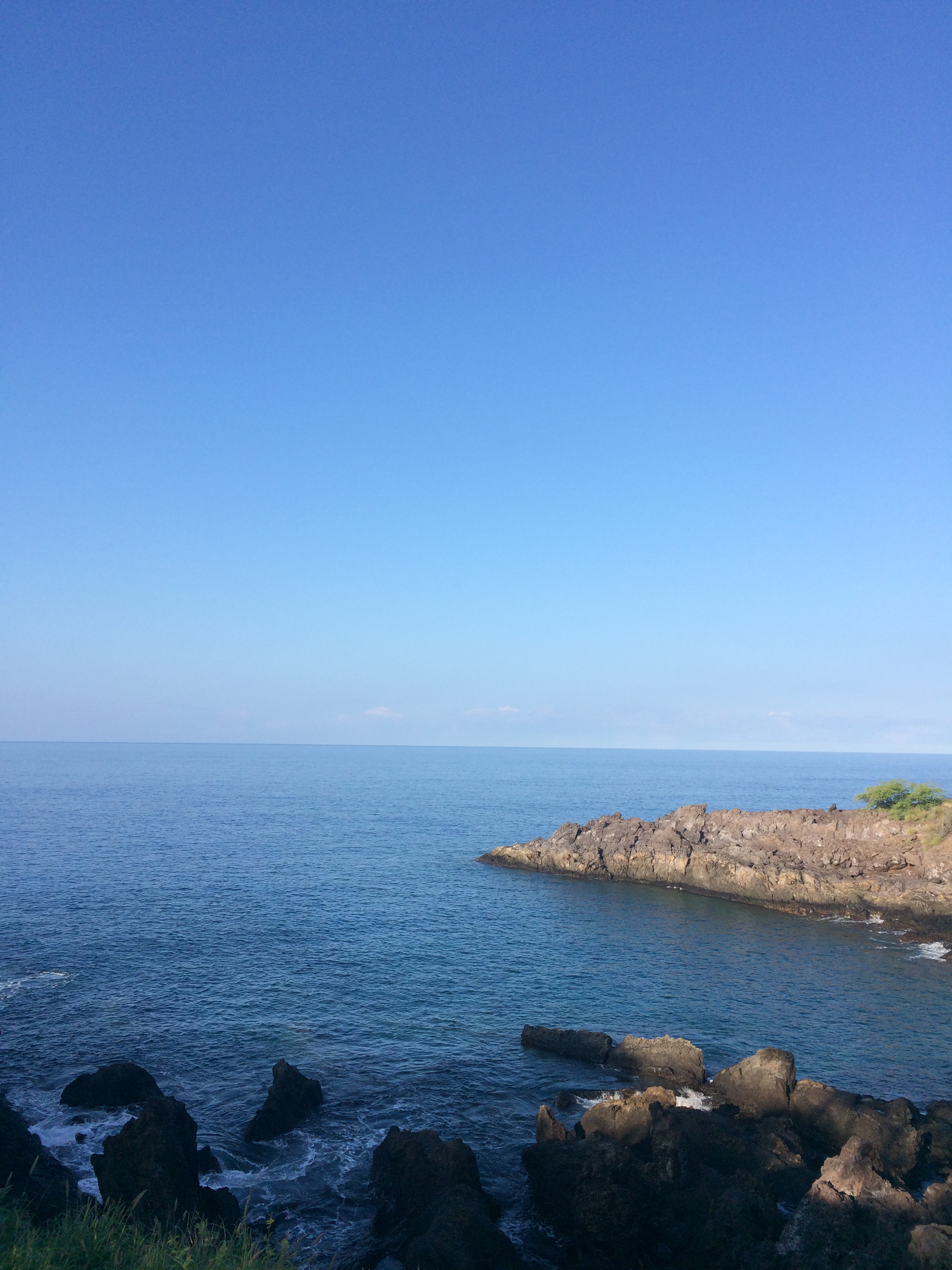
Kai Opae peninsula

Kai Opae is a rocky peninsula located on the island of Hawai'i. The formation was at one point called "Shrimp Water" in reference to a battle fought on the peninsula between Lonoikamakahiki and Kanaloanuiokeakawaiea warriors. There are no references as to why the battle took place.
