= Hawaiian Islands Biosphere Reserve =

Coordinates: 19.4114°N 155.4473°W

The Hawaiian Islands Biosphere Reserve is a UNESCO biosphere reserve in the Hawaiian Islands, created in 1980. It comprises Hawaii Volcanoes National Park on the island of Hawaii, and Haleakala National Park on the island of Maui, with a total area of 995.45 square kilometres.
