= Hawaii International Conference on Education =

American annual education conference

- Abbreviation: HICE
- Discipline: Education, Higher Education, School leadership, and other related education fields

Publication details
- Publisher: Hawaii International Conference on Education
- History: 2003–
- Frequency: annual

The Hawaii International Conference on Education (HICE) is an annual conference for Education academics and professionals currently sponsored by Pepperdine University, The University of Louisville, California State University, East Bay, and New Horizons in Education. The conference provides a platform for panel discussions and the presentation of peer-reviewed education research papers. Papers selected for presentation appear in the Proceedings of the Hawaii International Conference on Education, which has grown to constitute nearly 45,000 pages of refereed material in the 9-year history of the conference.

The first HICE took place in 2003. The conference now attracts over 1100 representatives from over 40 countries.

== HICE Conferences ==
Past HICE conferences include:

Year	Name	Island	Place
2021	HICE-19	Virtual conference.	
2012	HICE-10	Oahu	Waikiki Beach Marriott Resort & Spa and the Hilton Waikiki Beach Hotel
2011	HICE-9	Oahu	Hilton Hawaiian Village
2010	HICE-8	Oahu	Waikiki Beach Marriott Resort & Spa
2009	HICE-7	Oahu	Hilton Hawaiian Village
2008	HICE-6	Oahu	The Waikiki Beach Marriott Resort & Spa and The Hilton Waikiki Prince Kuhio
2007	HICE-5	Oahu	The Waikiki Beach Marriott Resort & Spa, The Hilton Waikiki Prince Kuhio, and the Pacific Beach Hotel
2006	HICE-4	Oahu	The Hawaii Prince Hotel
2005	HICE-3	Oahu	Sheraton Waikiki Hotel
2004	HICE-2	Oahu	Renaissance Ilikai Waikiki Hotel
2003	HICE-1	Oahu	Renaissance Ilikai Waikiki Hotel
