= Maui Trade Dollars =

The Maui Trade Dollar program was created in 1992 to raise funds for the non-profit Maui Chamber of Commerce Foundation. The Maui Trade Dollar is a cupro-nickel (75% copper 25% nickel alloy) trade token 1 mm larger diameter than a traditional United States silver dollar. They are a commonly sought after collector's item, often exchanged or traded in order to complete the sets dating from the 1992 issue. Each year a new design is created with emphasis on Maui's unique wildlife. In 1992, the Maui Trade Dollar sold for $1.00 at a number of retailers on Maui. Beginning with the release of the 2008 Maui Trade Dollar, the token sold for $2.00 a piece and could be bought from the Maui Chamber of Commerce's website, as well as many local retail outlets.

An earlier series of Maui dollars was issued in the 1970s by the Maui Chamber of Commerce in a similar size, although thinner and made of brass. On one such undated coin the words "LAHAINA FIRST CAPITAL" are written along the bottom and "MAUI DOLLAR" along the top, with the Kingdom of Hawaii coat of arms in the center flanked by two sailing ships. The reverse side features a picture of the "IAO NEEDLE" in the center with the Hawaiian phrase, "MAUI NO KA OI" above and the words, "THE VALLEY ISLE" below. Another copper coin is dated 1976. These coins were issued as part of a series that also included Kona Dollars, Honolulu Dollars, Kauai Dollars, and possibly others.

Continental Coin Company minted the first Maui Trade Dollars and minted 2,000 39mm .999 fine silver Trade dollars and a select number of gold plated proof Maui Trade dollars, sold in a set box of the three different versions.
