= Puʻuʻokeʻokeʻo =

Mountain peak in Hawaii

Highest point
- Elevation: 6,864 ft (2,092 m)
- Coordinates: 19°12′49.05″N 155°44′30.90″WGNIS 363629

Geography
- Location: Hawaii, U.S.
- Parent range: Hawaiian Islands

Geology
- Rock age: less than 200 thousand years
- Volcanic zone: Hawaiian-Emperor seamount chain

Climbing
- Easiest route: Mountaineering Trek

Puʻuʻokeʻokeʻo is a 6,864-foot (2,092 m) mountain peak near Hawaiian Ocean View, Hawaii. This peak is a satellite and sub peak of Mauna Loa.
