= Pakaʻa =

Hawaiian god of the wind

- God of the wind; inventor of the sail
- Venerated in: Hawaiian religion
- Gender: Male
- Parents: Kuanuʻuanu (father); Laʻamaomao (mother)
- Offspring: Ku-a-Pakaʻa

In Hawaiian mythology, Pakaʻa is the god of the wind and the inventor of the sail.

In the legend, Pakaʻa was the child of a traveling royal named Kuanuʻuanu and a beautiful common woman named Laʻamaomao. Kuanu'uanu was summoned back to his liege Keawenuiaumi before Pakaʻa's birth. Pakaʻa was then raised by Laʻamaomao and her elder brother Maʻilou, who Pakaʻa was told was his father. Pakaʻa however questioned this, because despite his young age, he was much taller than Maʻilou.

He then went traveling with the king of Kauaʻi, Paiʻea, to the other Hawaiian Islands, taking the Gord of Laʻamaomao, which gave him control over the many winds of Hawaii.

He later served under Keawenuiaumi and taught his son Ku-a-Pakaʻa to follow in his footsteps.
