= Hana aloha =

Hawaiian term for the art of love magic

Hana aloha is a Hawaiian term for the art of love magic. The practice of hana aloha was performed by a kahuna (priest) who conducted a ceremony to gain the desired effect. An infatuated person may request a hana aloha in order to instill a lust into a desired victim, or a shy person may request a ceremony that simply brings the desired person in closer proximity. Conversely a person who felt that they were afflicted by love-inducing magic could request a "pale hana aloha" ceremony in order to ward off the unwanted love. Some kahuna would only conduct a hana aloha ceremony if the love was one that was spiritually pure. One test used to determine this was to stir a bowl of water and place two flowers, particularly those of the ko'oloa'ula (Abutilon menziesii) in the turbulent liquid. If the flowers quickly met and floated together then the love was ordained, but if the flowers avoided each other the ceremony was not to be conducted.

== Sugarcane ==
The ceremony invariably uses sugarcane as an essential element, and specific varieties of sugarcane were applied to different ends. The names of the canes themselves hinted at their particular use, utilizing the Hawaiian wit that constantly played puns of the multiple meanings of words. The "papa'a cane", a particularly dark cane, literally means burnt and refers to the slightly burnt flavor of the molasses of this variety. Papa'a can also mean "tight, walled, secure," and therefore was used in the hana aloha that aimed to make a secure, long-term relationship. "Manulele", referring to a flying bird, was applied to a distant love. The "Pilimai" variety, literally meaning "come this way," was used to cause intense but short lived affairs. Other cane varieties associated with the hana aloha are the "Lahi" and "Kea" varieties. The counter action to the hana aloha magic utilized the "Laukona" sugarcane variety in a ceremony called pale hana aloha.

While the hana aloha ceremony focused on prayer it would at times be accompanied by a "magic potion," to be drunk either by the infatuated person or his/hers object of desire.
