= Living Art Marine Center =

Marine Science Education Center in the city and county of Honolulu, Hawaii, US

- Interactive map of Living Art Marine Center
- 21°20′02″N 157°54′50″W
- Date opened: 2010
- Date closed: 2022
- Location: Honolulu, Hawaii, United States
- Website: livingartmarinecenter.org

The Living Art Marine Center was a Marine Science Education Center in the city and county of Honolulu in the state of Hawaii. Developer of Hawaiian Sealife, Richard Xie, founded the Living Art Marine Center in 2010. The Living Art Marine Center focuses on educational programs and interactive activities about marine life and the importance of sustainability within the oceans around the world.

Tours of the aquarium must be booked in advance, and are intended for children. At the end of the tour visitors can make gyotaku print shirts or shell necklaces. There is also an area where visitors can touch sea cucumbers, hermit crabs, and other small marine animals.
