= Kīpū Falls =

Coordinates: 21°57′0″N 159°25′10.7″W

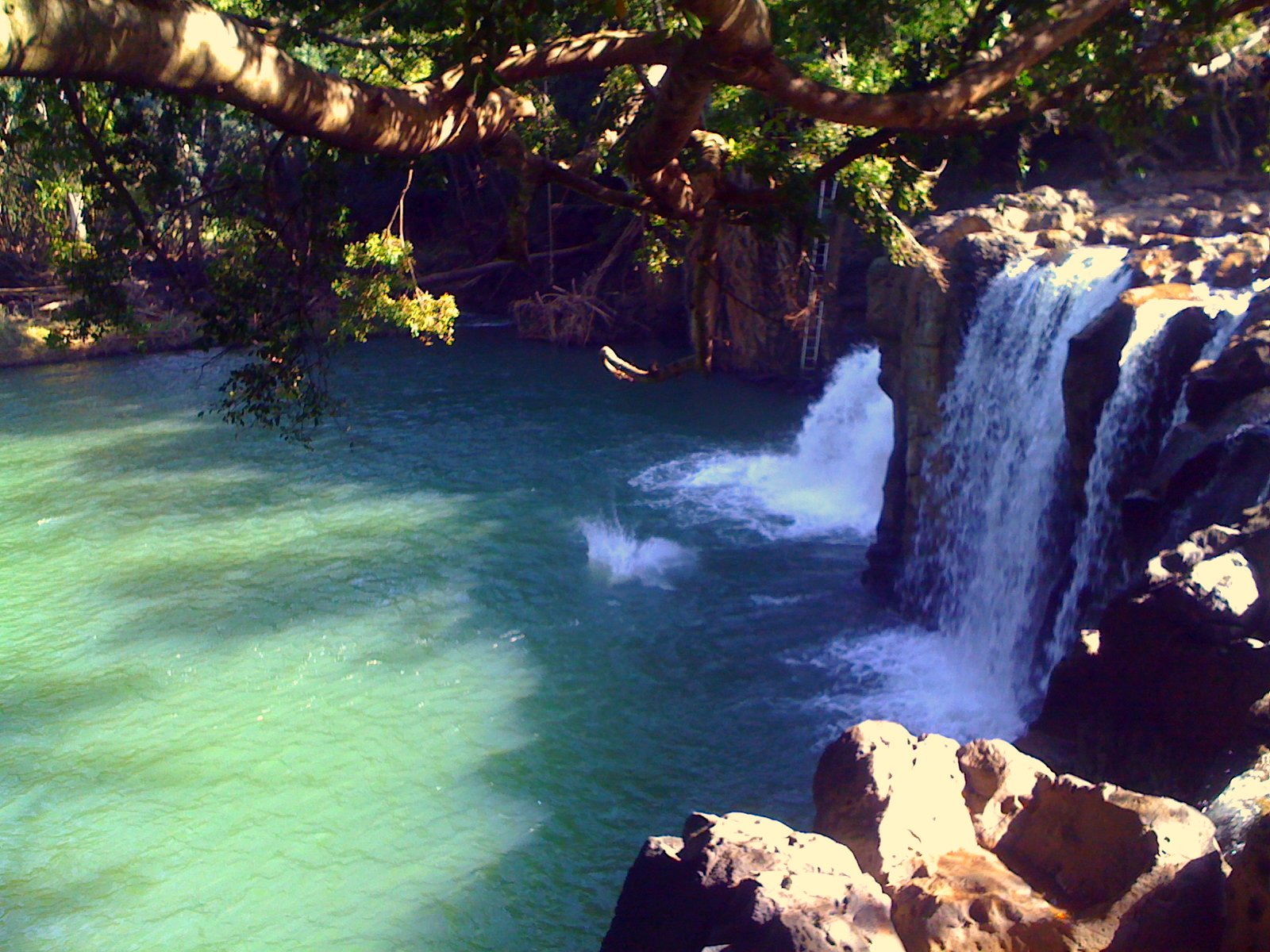
- Interactive map of Kīpū Falls
- Location: Up Hulēʻia Stream from Hulēʻia National Wildlife Refuge, Kauaʻi, Hawaii, United States
- Total height: 20 feet (6.1 m)
- Number of drops: 1
- Longest drop: 20 feet (6.1 m)
- Watercourse: Hulēʻia Stream

Kīpū Falls is a waterfall in East Kauaʻi, Hawaii.

Kīpū Falls has a dangerous reputation due to drowning deaths of five people in a five-year span, as well as numerous other injuries. Due to the drowning deaths, Grove Farms Company, which owns the land where the falls are located, decided to block off the access route. From a legal perspective, visitors were trespassing, as the falls were not actually open to the public. Injuries became more prevalent after guide books began publicizing the falls.

Kīpū Falls is also widely known for being the filming location of the introduction scene of the 1981 film Raiders of the Lost Ark.

== See also ==
- List of waterfalls
