= Āhole Hōlua Complex =

Historic Place in Hawaii County, Hawaii

- U.S. National Register of Historic Places
- U.S. Historic district
- Location within Hawaii
- Nearest city: Milolii, Hawaii
- Coordinates: 19°08′11″N 155°54′49″W
- Area: 29 acres (12 ha)
- Architectural style: Hōlua slide
- NRHP reference No.: 73000655
- Added to NRHP: November 26, 1973

The Āhole Hōlua Complex is a hōlua slide located on Āhole Inlet on the southwest side of the island of Hawaii. The slide was used in the Native Hawaiian sport of hōlua, in which upper-class men raced toboggans down lava slides covered in slippery grasses. Stone platforms along the side of the slide allowed spectators to watch the races. The slide consists of a 60 metres (200 ft) slope and a 23 metres (75 ft) runway; the slope and length of the slide indicate that the Native Hawaiians had developed advanced engineering skills. The slide is among the best-preserved hōlua slides in Hawaii.

The slide was added to the National Register of Historic Places on November 26, 1973.
