= Labor Party (Hawaii) =

- Founded: 1908
- Headquarters: Honolulu, Hawaii

The Labor Party was a short-lived political party in the Territory of Hawaii. It was founded to support William Charles Achi in his campaign for Mayor of Honolulu in 1908 but lost.
