= List of Hawaiian composers =

This is a list of Hawaiian composers:

- King Lunalilo (wrote lyrics to "E Ola Ke Alii Ke Akua")
- King Kalakaua (wrote lyrics to "Hawaii Ponoii")
- Queen Liliʻuokalani (wrote more than 200 compositions)
- Leilehua Lanzilotti (The 2022 Pulitzer Prize Finalist in Music)
