= SMART Magazine =

SMART Magazine was a Hawaii-based fashion, beauty and lifestyle publication, featuring "information and advice on all aspects of fashion, beauty, and lifestyle.". The publication was sold throughout Hawaii and was also available through online subscription. For a time, it edited a regular column in MidWeek.

The magazine was launched in April 2005 in a flurry of local publicity. It was at first published eight times a year, and was published quarterly by the time of its closing.

SMART Magazine's fall 2008 issue was its final one.

== Staff ==
- Molly Watanabe (Founder/Publication Director): Advertising, Marketing, PR
- Amy Alston (Founder/Publication Director): Advertising, Distribution
- Sarah Honda (Editor/Art Director): Editorial
