= A. Nanbu Hotel-Holy's Bakery =

Historic Place in Hawaii County, Hawaii

- A. Nanbu Hotel--Holy's Bakery
- U.S. National Register of Historic Places
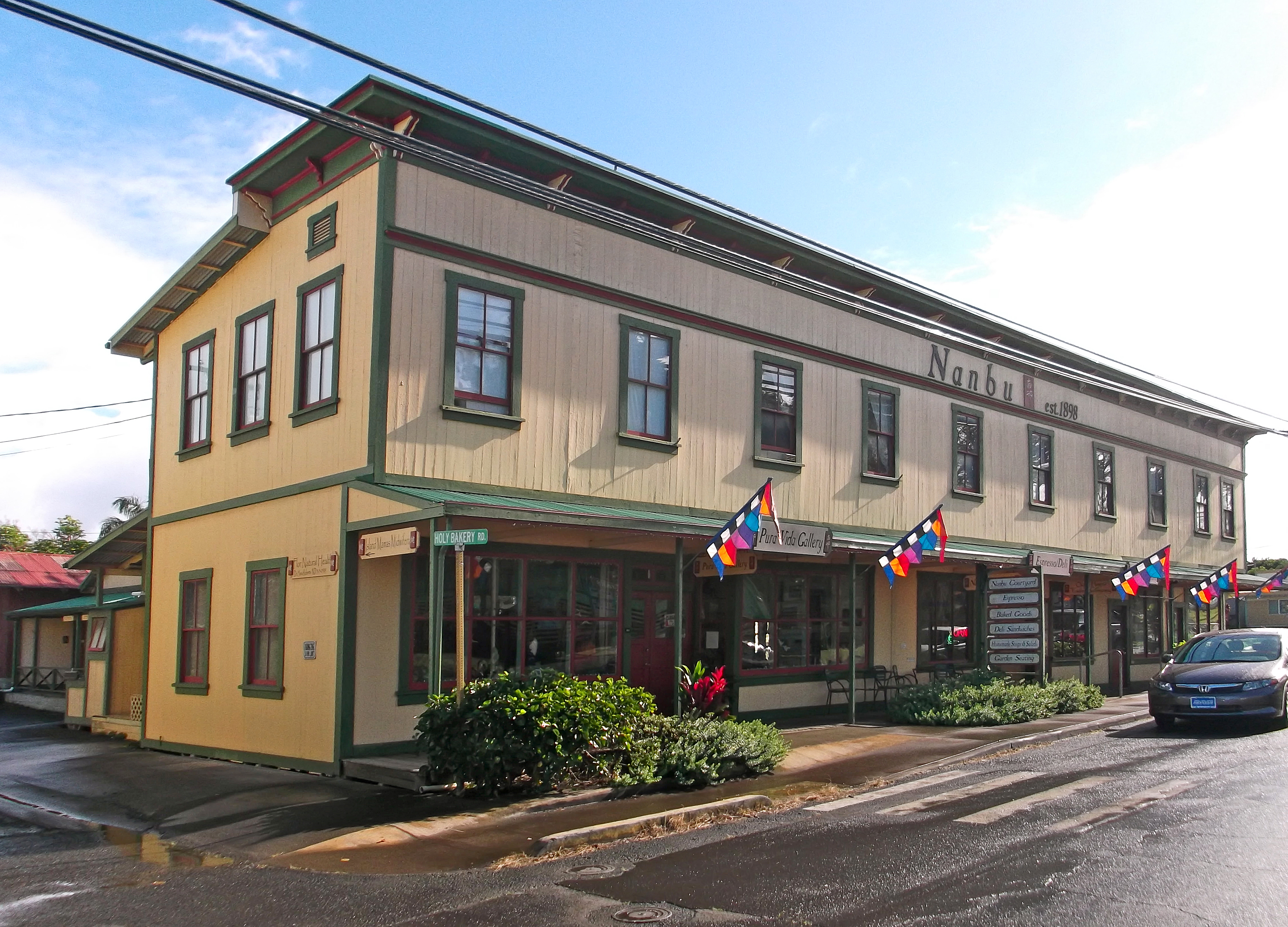

- Location within Hawaii
- Location: Akoni Pule Hwy., Kapa'au, Hawaii
- Coordinates: 20°13′55″N 155°47′57″W
- Area: less than one acre
- Built: c. 1900
- Architectural style: Italianate
- NRHP reference No.: 99001356
- Added to NRHP: November 18, 1999

The A. Nanbu Hotel-Holy's Bakery building is a historic building complex located in Kapaau on the island of Hawaii. The A. Nanbu Hotel, the original section of the building, was constructed circa 1900 and features a simplified Italianate design. Japanese immigrant Ayataro Nanbu purchased the hotel in 1917 and renamed it after himself. In addition to housing out-of-town visitors, the hotel played an important social function for the residents of Kapaau, as it hosted community meetings and gatherings and housed a local restaurant, bar, bakery, and dry goods store. Holy's Bakery was added to the back of the hotel in 1932 by Yoshio Hori, Nanbu's nephew; its name came from an error made by its signmaker, who was supposed to name the bakery after Hori. The hotel closed in the 1960s after Nanbu's death, while the bakery remains in operation and is still popular on the island.

The building was added to the National Register of Historic Places on November 18, 1999.
