= Halehomaha, Hawaii =

Unincorporated community in Hawaii, United States

- Unincorporated community
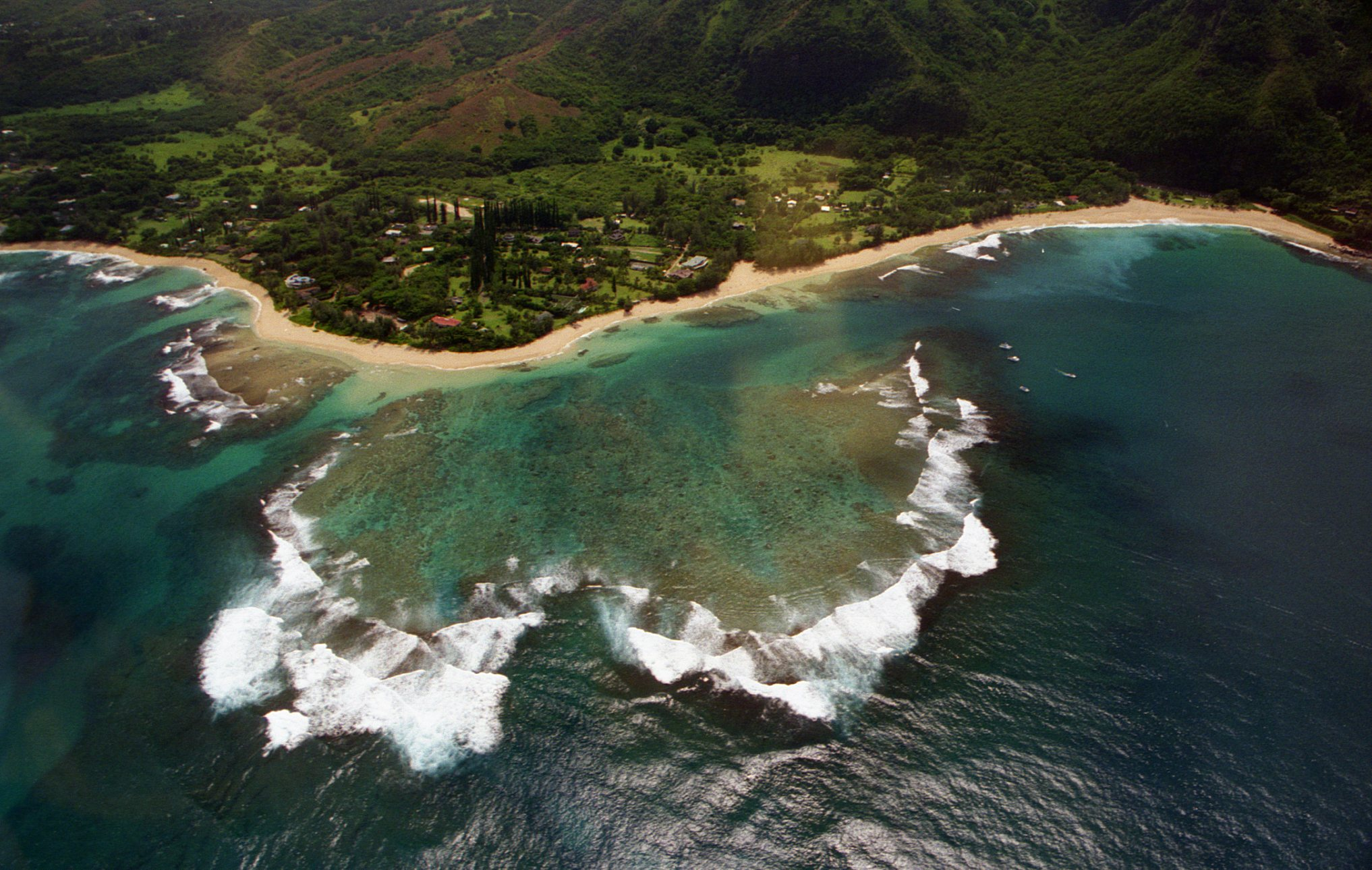
- Aerial view of Halehomaha, 1997

- Location within Hawaii
- Coordinates: 22°13′33″N 159°32′59″W
- Country: United States
- State: Hawaii
- County: Kauaʻi
- Elevation: 0 ft (0 m)
- Time zone: UTC-10 (Hawaii-Aleutian)
- Area code: 808
- GNIS feature ID: 365075

Halehomaha is an unincorporated community on the island of Kauaʻi in Kauaʻi County, Hawaii, United States. The community is located on the Pacific Ocean on the north shore of the island and is directly north of Ha'ena State Park. Halehomaha is served by Hawaii Route 560.
