= Hawaii Rugby Union =

American local sports governing body

- Sport: Rugby union
- Founded: 1975 (as Hawaii RFU)
- USAR affiliation: 2009 (Associate Union)
- Website: www.hawaiirugbyunion.org

The Hawaii Rugby Union is the local governing body for rugby union teams in the state of Hawaii. Rugby Hawaii Inc. is a non-profit organization and an associate union (AU) under the umbrella of the national organization, USA Rugby.

== History ==
Rugby union in Hawaii was effectively established with the founding of the Hawaii Harlequins Club in 1964, although occasional games had been played earlier in Hawaiian history as far back as 1884.

The Harlequins staged annual invitational tournaments in the 1980s at Kapiolani Park, that attracted teams from the around the Asia-Pacific, Australasia and North America which promoted the development of rugby in Hawaii.

The original Hawaii Rugby Football Union was founded in 1975, and they selected teams from 1976 onwards to make tours to the United States mainland as well as other rugby destinations including Australia and New Zealand. Hawaii also played in the curtain raiser for the 1987 World Cup in New Zealand, defeating Rotorua.

Hawaii Youth Rugby was founded as a non-profit organization in 2004 to build rugby programs for boys and girls and increase participation in rugby. It became a State Based Rugby Organization (SBRO) under the USA Rugby umbrella in 2009.

== Clubs ==
=== Men’s ===
- Laie Tanoa
- Laie Rhinos
- Kalihi Raiders
- Marist
- Titans
- Hawaii Harlequins
- Western Bulldogs
- Big Island Barbarians

=== Women’s ===
- Lady Raiders
- South Shore Rugby

=== Youth ===
Big Island

- Hilo Reign Youth
- Keaukaha Sharks
- Kona Bulls
- Puna Chiefs
- Waimea Boars

Oahu

- Kahuku Red Raiders
- Laie Rugby
- Pasefika
- Kalihi Raiders
