= Kuhimana (god) =

Hawaiian God of soothsayers

- God of soothsayers and astrologers
- Venerated in: Hawaiian religion
- Gender: Male

In Hawaiian mythology, Kuhimana was a god of soothsayers.

Historian David Malo said that "soothsayers and those who studied the signs of the heavens (kilokilo) worshipped the god Kuhimana."

He was also called the god of astrologers.
