= National Register of Historic Places listings on the island of Hawaiʻi =

Location of the island of Hawaiʻi

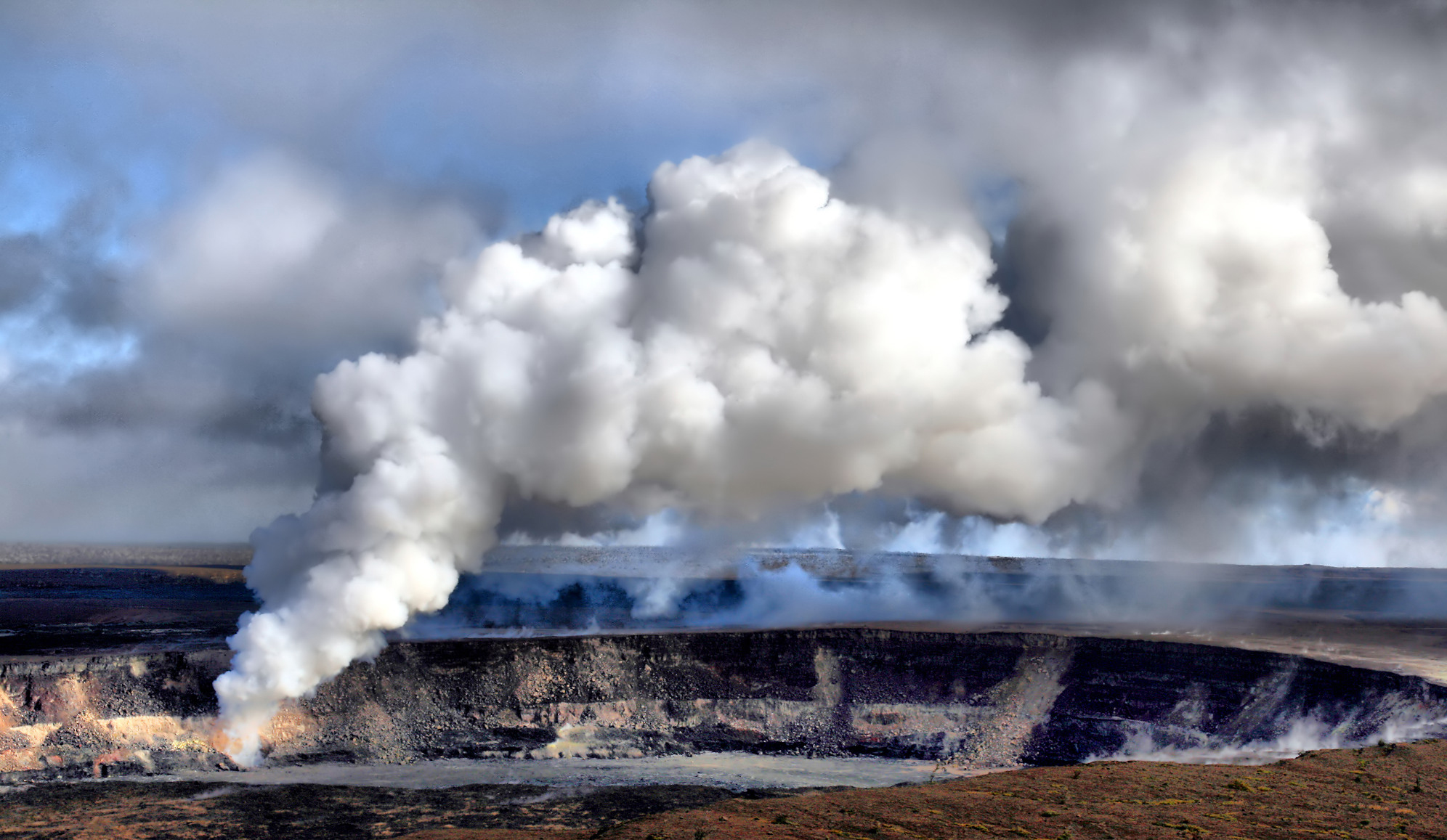
Several sites are within Hawaiʻi Volcanoes National Park, a UNESCO World Heritage Site

This is a list of properties and districts on the island of Hawaiʻi in the U.S. state of Hawaii that are listed on the National Register of Historic Places. The island is coterminous with Hawaiʻi County, the state's only county that covers exactly one island. There are 98 properties and districts on the island, including 10 historic districts, six National Historic Landmarks, and one National Historic Landmark District.

== Current listings ==
	Name on the Register	Image	Date listed	Location	City or town	Description
1	1790 Footprints	1790 Footprints	August 7, 1974 (#74000351)	9.1 miles south of park headquarters on Hawaiʻi Route 11, then along a foot trail to the southeast for 1 mile 19°23′00″N 155°20′07″W	Hawaiʻi Volcanoes National Park	Footprints left in solidified ash from Kilauea eruption
2	Āhole Hōlua Complex		November 26, 1973 (#73000655)	South of Milolii on Ahole Bay; 19°08′27″N 155°54′58″W	Miloliʻi	
3	Ahu A ʻUmi Heiau	Ahu A ʻUmi Heiau	August 13, 1974 (#74000343)	Address Restricted	North Kona	Royal complex on high remote plateau
4	Ainahou Ranch	Ainahou Ranch	February 8, 1995 (#94001619)	Off Chain of Craters Road in Hawaiʻi Volcanoes National Park; 19°20′37″N 155°13′44″W	Hawaii Volcanoes National Park	Built by Shipman family as refuge from World War II, used to raise endangered Hawaiian goose
5	ʻĀinapō Trail	ʻĀinapō Trail	August 30, 1974 (#74000290)	Hawaii Volcanoes National Park; 19°27′39″N 155°34′39″W	Mauna Loa	Ancient trail to the Mokuaweoweo summit
6	Ala Loa	Ala Loa	June 5, 1987 (#87001127)	Off Hawaiʻi Route 19 from Kiholo bay to Kalahuipaua'a; 19°53′49″N 155°54′02″W	South Kohala	Part of Ala Kahakai National Historic Trail
7	John J., Sr. and Rose Andrade Property		June 3, 2025 (#100011893)	45-493 Lehua Street; 20°04′47″N 155°28′09″W	Honokaʻa	
8	Anna Ranch	Anna Ranch	April 28, 2008 (#06001120)	65-1480 Kawaihae Rd. 20°01′23″N 155°45′59″W	Kamuela	
9	Awong Brothers Store		March 3, 2022 (#100004873)	45-3600 Māmane St. 20°04′45″N 155°28′07″W	Honokaʻa	
10	Bank of Hawai'i, Ltd.	Bank of Hawai'i, Ltd.	April 30, 2018 (#100002360)	45-3568 Māmane St. 20°04′44″N 155°28′03″W	Honokaʻa	
11	Bobcat Trail Habitation Cave (50-10-30-5004)		May 15, 1986 (#86001086)	Address Restricted	Pohakuloa	
12	Bond District	Bond District	March 30, 1978 (#78001016)	Southeast of Kapaau off Hawaii Route 270; 20°13′33″N 155°47′33″W	Kapaau	Homestead of Elias Bond, Kalahikiola Church, and Kohala Seminary
13	M.S. Botelho Building and Garage	M.S. Botelho Building and Garage	March 15, 2018 (#100002214)	45-3490 Māmane St. 20°04′42″N 155°27′57″W	Honokaʻa	
14	Francis H. Ii Brown House		August 21, 1986 (#86001616)	Keawaiki Bay; 19°53′16″N 155°54′22″W	Waimea	Beach home for golfing champion Francis Hyde ʻĪʻī Brown (1892–1976)
15	Chee Ying Society		July 20, 1978 (#78001014)	Hawaii Route 24; 20°05′05″N 155°28′34″W	Honokaʻa	
16	Daifukuji Soto Zen Mission	Daifukuji Soto Zen Mission	April 21, 1994 (#94000382)	Mamalahoa Highway; 19°32′32″N 155°55′41″W	Honalo	Buddhist Temple built 1920–1921
17	District Courthouse and Police Station	District Courthouse and Police Station	September 4, 1979 (#79000752)	141 Kalakaua St. 19°43′46″N 155°05′17″W	Hilo	Built in 1932; now home of East Hawaii Cultural Center
18	Ferreira Building	Ferreira Building	October 29, 2015 (#15000756)	45-3625 Māmane St. 20°04′45″N 155°28′10″W	Honokaʻa	
19	First Bank of Hilo, Ltd.	First Bank of Hilo, Ltd.	December 28, 2017 (#100001916)	45-3490 Māmane St., Unit G 20°04′42″N 155°27′57″W	Honokaʻa	
20	Matsujiro Fujino Property	Matsujiro Fujino Property	August 19, 2019 (#100004285)	45-3390 Māmane St. 20°04′38″N 155°27′47″W	Honokaʻa	
21	Greenwell Store	Greenwell Store	May 22, 1978 (#78001017)	Hawaii Route 11; 19°30′55″N 155°55′24″W	Kealakekua	Store built in 1870 now houses the Kona Historical Society Museum
22	Thomas Guard House	Thomas Guard House	December 23, 2003 (#03001311)	240 Kaʻiulani St. 19°43′40″N 155°06′03″W	Hilo	Neoclassical style home, architects Clinton Briggs Ripley and Louis Davis (architect)
23	Hale Halawai O Holualoa	Hale Halawai O Holualoa	June 5, 1987 (#87000794)	76-6224 Aliʻi Dr. 19°36′36″N 155°58′41″W	Kailua-Kona	Known as the "Living Stones Church"
24	Hāmākua Country Club		November 20, 2025 (#100011796)	45-3280 Māmalahoa Highway; 20°04′10″N 155°27′34″W	Honokaʻa	
25	S. Hata Building	S. Hata Building	August 27, 1991 (#91001087)	318 Kamehameha Ave. 19°43′41″N 155°05′17″W	Hilo	Built by Japanese American family business in 1912
26	Heiau in Kukuipahu		April 24, 1973 (#73000652)	Address Restricted	Hawi	
27	International Longshore and Warehouse Union (ILWU) Jack Wayne Hall Building	International Longshore and Warehouse Union (ILWU) Jack Wayne Hall Building	October 23, 2018 (#100001917)	45-3720 Honoka'a-Waipi'o Rd. 20°04′48″N 155°28′19″W	Honoka'a	
28	Walter Irving and Jean Henderson House	Walter Irving and Jean Henderson House	February 28, 2011 (#11000057)	82 Halaulani Place; 19°43′58″N 155°05′29″W	Hilo	Halaulani Place, 1917-1960 MPS; Craftsman bungalow built 1925
29	Hilina Pali Road	Hilina Pali Road	January 14, 2015 (#09000587)	Hawaii Volcanoes National Park; 19°24′06″N 155°15′56″W	Hilo vicinity	
30	W.H. Hill House	W.H. Hill House	February 28, 2011 (#11000055)	91 Halaulani Place; 19°44′00″N 155°05′28″W	Hilo	Halaulani Place, 1917-1960 MPS; Craftsman bungalow built 1919
31	Hilo Masonic Lodge Hall-Bishop Trust Building	Hilo Masonic Lodge Hall-Bishop Trust Building	April 21, 1994 (#94000383)	Junction of Keawe and Waianuenue Streets; 19°43′33″N 155°05′17″W	Hilo	Also known as the Kaikodo (Restaurant) Building
32	James M. Hind House	James M. Hind House	February 3, 1994 (#93001557)	Skilled Camp, House J 20°06′58″N 155°34′51″W	Hawi	
33	Holualoa 4 Archeological District (State Site No. 50-10-37-23.661)	Holualoa 4 Archeological District (State Site No. 50-10-37-23.661)	June 8, 2005 (#05000542)	Aliʻi Drive; 19°36′21″N 155°58′39″W	Kailua-Kona	Complex of temples and royal residences
34	Honokaʻa Catholic Properties–Our Lady of Lourdes Catholic Church		February 28, 2022 (#100007451)	45-5028 Plumeria St. 20°04′41″N 155°28′12″W	Honokaʻa	
35	Honokaʻa Hongwanji Buddhist Mission		April 8, 2021 (#100006348)	45-516 Lehua St. and on Honokaʻa-Waipiʻo Highway .47 miles (0.76 km) west of jct. with Lehua St. 20°04′43″N 155°28′12″W	Honokaʻa	
36	Honokaa People's Theatre	Honokaa People's Theatre	October 6, 2015 (#15000684)	45-3574 Māmane St. 20°04′45″N 155°28′04″W	Honokaʻa	
37	Honoka'a Public Library	Honoka'a Public Library	January 16, 2020 (#100004874)	45-3380 Mamane St., Bldg. # 3; 20°04′37″N 155°27′45″W	Honokaʻa	
38	Honoka'a United Methodist Church	Honoka'a United Methodist Church	December 21, 2017 (#100001413)	45-3525 Māmane St. 20°04′43″N 155°27′59″W	Honokaʻa	
39	Honokōhau Settlement	Honokōhau Settlement	October 15, 1966 (#66000287)	Address Restricted	Kailua-Kona	Inside Kaloko-Honokohau National Historical Park
40	Hotel Honokaa Club	Hotel Honokaa Club	October 6, 2015 (#15000685)	45-3480 Māmane St. 20°04′42″N 155°27′55″W	Honokaʻa	
41	Huliheʻe Palace	Huliheʻe Palace	May 25, 1973 (#73000653)	Aliʻi Drive; 19°38′32″N 155°59′51″W	Kailua-Kona	Built by Governor Kuakini
42	B. Ikeuchi & Sons, Inc. Property		July 1, 2022 (#100007882)	45-495 Māmane St. 20°04′22″N 155°27′11″W	Honokaʻa	
43	ʻImiola Church	ʻImiola Church	August 28, 1975 (#75000618)	Northeast of Waimea on Hawaii Route 19; 20°01′50″N 155°39′56″W	Waimea	1855 church with solid koa wood interior
44	Kahaluʻu Historic District	Kahaluʻu Historic District	December 27, 1974 (#74000713)	Address Restricted	Holualoa	Complex of temples and royal residences
45	Kahikolu Church	Kahikolu Church	November 15, 1982 (#82000148)	Southeast of Napoopoo; 19°28′10″N 155°54′55″W	Napoopoo	Built in 1852 on ruins of 1833 church
46	Keāhole Permanent House Site 10,205	Keāhole Permanent House Site 10,205	November 21, 1992 (#92001552)	Near Kalihi Point, Natural Energy Laboratory of Hawaii; 19°43′35″N 156°03′31″W	Kailua-Kona	Ancient house site
47	Kaloko-Honokōhau National Historical Park	Kaloko-Honokōhau National Historical Park	November 10, 1978 (#78003148)	Island of Hawaii; 19°41′05″N 156°01′22″W	Kailua-Kona	Ancient fish ponds and settlement ruins
48	Kamakahonu, Residence Of King Kamehameha I	Kamakahonu, Residence Of King Kamehameha I	October 15, 1966 (#66000288)	On the northwestern edge of Kailua Bay, north and west of Kailua Wharf; 19°38′20″N 155°59′51″W	Kailua-Kona	Kamehameha I lived here after unifying the islands
49	Kamehameha Hall	Kamehameha Hall	May 20, 1993 (#93000426)	1162 Kalanianaole Ave. 19°43′53″N 155°02′42″W	Hilo	Meeting house of the Royal Order of Kamehameha I
50	Kamehameha III's Birthplace	Kamehameha III's Birthplace	July 24, 1978 (#78001018)	Off Alii Dr. 19°34′00″N 155°57′50″W	Keauhou	Marker at Keauhou Bay
51	Kamoa Point Complex	Kamoa Point Complex	July 14, 1983 (#83000247)	Address Restricted	Kailua-Kona	Royal complex on Holualoa Bay
52	Kealakekua Bay Historical District	Kealakekua Bay Historical District	December 12, 1973 (#73000651)	Southwest of Captain Cook off Hawaii Route 11; 19°28′29″N 155°55′27″W	Captain Cook	Religious center in use during early European visits
53	Keauhou Hōlua Slide	Keauhou Hōlua Slide	October 15, 1966 (#66000290)	East of Hawaii Route 18; 19°33′44″N 155°57′30″W	Keauhou	Hawaiian lava sledding "extreme sport" course
54	Kii Petroglyphs		July 12, 1984 (#84000919)	Address Restricted	Waiohinu	
55	Kīlauea Crater	Kīlauea Crater	July 24, 1974 (#74000291)	Southwest of Hilo in Hawaii Volcanoes National Park; 19°25′02″N 155°16′36″W	Hilo	Active volcano is a world heritage site
56	Kohala District Courthouse	Kohala District Courthouse	August 31, 1979 (#79000754)	Government Rd. 20°13′59″N 155°48′03″W	Kapaau	
57	Kamekichi and Mika Kotake Store Property	Kamekichi and Mika Kotake Store Property	January 16, 2020 (#100001918)	45-3620 Mamane St. 20°04′46″N 155°28′09″W	Honoka'a	
58	Kuamoʻo Burials	Kuamoʻo Burials	August 13, 1974 (#74000714)	Address Restricted	Kailua-Kona	Site of 1819 battle, South of Keauhou Bay
59	Lapakahi Complex	Lapakahi Complex	July 2, 1973 (#73000654)	Akoni Pule Highway; 20°10′31″N 155°53′50″W	Mahukona	Reconstructed ancient fishing village; State Historical Park and Marine Life Conservation District
60	Levi and Netti Lyman House	Levi and Netti Lyman House	February 28, 2011 (#11000059)	40 Halaulani Place; 19°43′57″N 155°05′33″W	Hilo	Halaulani Place, 1917-1960 MPS; Colonial revival built 1922
61	Rev. D.B. Lyman House	Rev. D.B. Lyman House	March 24, 1978 (#78001012)	276 Haili St. 19°43′38″N 155°05′35″W	Hilo	1838 missionary house is now a museum
62	Mahana Archeological District (50HA10230)		October 14, 1986 (#86002802)	Address Restricted	Naalehu	
63	Manuka Bay Petroglyphs		September 19, 1973 (#73000656)	Address Restricted	Waiohinu	
64	Mauna Kea Adz Quarry		October 15, 1966 (#66000285)	Address restricted	Hilo	The largest primitive basalt quarry in the world
65	Mauna Kea Traditional Cultural Property and District		March 27, 2025 (#100010485)	Address restricted	Mauna Kea	
66	Mauna Loa Road	Mauna Loa Road	January 14, 2015 (#09000620)	Hawaii Volcanoes National Park; 19°26′15″N 155°18′10″W	Hilo vicinity	
67	Mokuʻaikaua Church	Mokuʻaikaua Church	October 3, 1978 (#78001015)	Off Hawaii Route 11; 19°38′39″N 155°59′48″W	Kailua-Kona	Oldest Christian Church in Hawaii
68	Moʻokini Heiau	Moʻokini Heiau	October 15, 1966 (#66000284)	Northern tip of Hawaii, 1 mile west of Upolu Point Airport; 20°15′44″N 155°52′59″W	Hawi	State Monument includes Kamehameha I birthplace
69	Edward H. and Claire Moses House	Edward H. and Claire Moses House	February 28, 2011 (#11000056)	105 Halaulani Place; 19°43′59″N 155°05′32″W	Hilo	Halaulani Place, 1917-1960 MPS; Craftsman bungalow built 1921
70	A. Nanbu Hotel-Holy's Bakery	A. Nanbu Hotel-Holy's Bakery	November 18, 1999 (#99001356)	Akoni Pule Highway; 20°13′55″N 155°47′57″W	Kapaau	
71	Old Volcano House No. 42	Old Volcano House No. 42	July 24, 1974 (#74000293)	Southwest of Hilo on Hawaii Route 11 in Hawaii Volcanoes National Park; 19°25′49″N 155°15′30″W	Hilo	Built in 1877; now Volcano Art Center gallery
72	Palace Theater	Palace Theater	May 11, 1993 (#93000376)	38 Haili St. 19°43′28″N 155°05′11″W	Hilo	A movie theater built in 1925, today an arthouse
73	James and Catherine Parker House	James and Catherine Parker House	February 28, 2011 (#11000058)	72 Halaulani Place; 19°43′58″N 155°05′29″W	Hilo	Halaulani Place, 1917-1960 MPS; Craftsman bungalow built 1924
74	Pua Akala Cabin		December 12, 2025 (#09000845)	Papa'ikou ahupua, Hakalau NWR; 19°47′22″N 155°19′51″W	Hakalau Forest National Wildlife Refuge	
75	Puʻuhonua o Hōnaunau National Historical Park	Puʻuhonua o Hōnaunau National Historical Park	October 15, 1966 (#66000104)	20 miles (32 km) south of Kailua-Kona; 19°25′22″N 155°54′35″W	Hōnaunau	Large ancient religious site formerly known as the "City of Refuge"
76	Puʻukoholā Heiau	Puʻukoholā Heiau	October 15, 1966 (#07001173)	0.9 miles southeast of Kawaihae; 20°01′35″N 155°49′12″W	Kawaihae	Kamehameha I temple built in 1790
77	Pu'ukohola Heiau National Historic Site	Pu'ukohola Heiau National Historic Site	August 17, 1972 (#66000105)	Northern end of Hawaii off Hawaii Route 26, about 1 mile southeast of Kawaihae; 20°01′52″N 155°49′30″W	Kawaihae	see above
78	Puaʻa-2 Agricultural Fields Archeological District	Puaʻa-2 Agricultural Fields Archeological District	October 14, 1986 (#86002804)	Address Restricted	Holualoa	Potentially destroyed
79	Puako Petroglyph Archeological District	Puako Petroglyph Archeological District	April 8, 1983 (#83000248)	Address Restricted	Puakō vicinity	
80	Puna-Kāʻu Historic District	Puna-Kāʻu Historic District	July 1, 1974 (#74000294)	Hawaii Volcanoes National Park; 19°17′42″N 155°14′31″W	Pāhala	
81	St. Benedict's Catholic Church	St. Benedict's Catholic Church	May 31, 1979 (#79000753)	Off Hawaii Route 11; 19°26′21″N 155°53′33″W	Hōnaunau	Another "Painted Church"
82	Masaaki Sakata Property	Masaaki Sakata Property	August 7, 2017 (#100001414)	45-3577 Māmane St. 20°04′44″N 155°28′05″W	Honokaʻa	
83	W.H. Shipman House	W.H. Shipman House	June 23, 1978 (#78001013)	141 Kaʻiulani Street; 19°43′27″N 155°05′58″W	Hilo	Built in 1899 for William Herbert Shipman, now a "Bed and Breakfast" Hotel
84	South Point Complex	South Point Complex	October 15, 1966 (#66000291)	Southern point of Hawaii; 18°54′57″N 155°40′35″W	Naalehu	Southernmost point in the United States
85	John Dias Souza Property		April 8, 2021 (#100006349)	45-3599 Māmane Street; 20°04′45″N 155°28′07″W	Honokaʻa	
86	Star of the Sea Church-Kalapana Painted Church	Star of the Sea Church-Kalapana Painted Church	May 14, 1997 (#97000407)	Hawaii Route 130, 0.7 miles north of Kaimu; 19°22′34″N 154°58′01″W	Kaimu	Small church near villages destroyed by lava flows
87	Tong Wo Society Building	Tong Wo Society Building	June 9, 1978 (#78001011)	Hawaii Route 27; 20°13′40″N 155°46′10″W	Halaula	
88	Herbert Austin Truslow House	Herbert Austin Truslow House	February 28, 2011 (#11000060)	52 Halaulani Place; 19°43′57″N 155°05′31″W	Hilo	Halaulani Place, 1917-1960 MPS; Craftsman bungalow built 1920
89	U.S. Post Office and Office Building	U.S. Post Office and Office Building	October 1, 1974 (#74000708)	Kinoole and Waianuenue Sts. 19°43′49″N 155°05′31″W	Hilo	Built in 1915, still used as Federal offices
90	Uchida Coffee Farm	Uchida Coffee Farm	February 9, 1995 (#94001621)	Off Mamalahoa Highway; 19°29′24″N 155°54′49″W	Kealakekua	Restored Japanese Kona coffee farm
91	Volcano Block Building	Volcano Block Building	January 7, 1993 (#92001748)	27-37 Waianuenue Ave. 19°43′44″N 155°05′24″W	Hilo	Commercial building built in 1914 with notable tenants
92	Waiākea Mission Station-Hilo Station	Waiākea Mission Station-Hilo Station	April 23, 2002 (#02000387)	211 Haili St. 19°43′37″N 155°05′31″W	Hilo	Haili Church built by Titus Coan 1854
93	Waimea Elementary School	Waimea Elementary School	June 8, 2005 (#05000541)	Hawaii Route 19, Kawaihae Rd. TMK (3)6-5-07:3; 20°01′25″N 155°40′21″W	Kamuela	First schoolhouse serving Waimea community and example of early Hawaiian plantation style
94	Whitney Seismograph Vault No. 29	Whitney Seismograph Vault No. 29	July 24, 1974 (#74000292)	Southwest of Hilo on Hawaii Route 11 in Hawaii Volcanoes National Park; 19°25′59″N 155°15′40″W	Hilo	Original home of Hawaiian Volcano Observatory founded by Thomas Jaggar in 1912
95	Wilkes Campsite	Wilkes Campsite	July 24, 1974 (#74000295)	West of Hilo at Mauna Loa Volcano in Hawaii Volcanoes National Park; 19°28′14″N 155°35′06″W	Hilo	Ruins of 1840 Charles Wilkes camp site at Mokuaweoweo summit
96	A.J. Williamson House	A.J. Williamson House	May 9, 1997 (#97000406)	31 Halaulani Pl. 19°44′11″N 155°05′44″W	Hilo	Craftsman bungalow built 1921
97	Kojiro Yamato Store and Garage		April 8, 2021 (#100006354)	45-3468 Māmane St. 20°04′41″N 155°27′54″W	Honokaʻa	
98	Teiji Yamatsuka Store	Teiji Yamatsuka Store	March 12, 2018 (#100001415)	45-3590 Māmane St. 20°04′45″N 155°28′06″W	Honokaʻa	

== See also ==
- List of National Historic Landmarks in Hawaii
- National Register of Historic Places listings in Hawaii
