= Anna Lindsay =

Anna Lindsay may refer to:

- Anna Robertson Brown Lindsay (1864–1948), first woman to earn a doctorate at the University of Pennsylvania
- Anna Lindsay (activist) (1845–1903), Scottish women's activist
- Anna Lindsey (rancher) (1900–1995), Hawai'ian rancher

== See also ==
- Anne Lindsay (disambiguation)
