= John Davis Paris =

American Christian missionary (1809–1892)

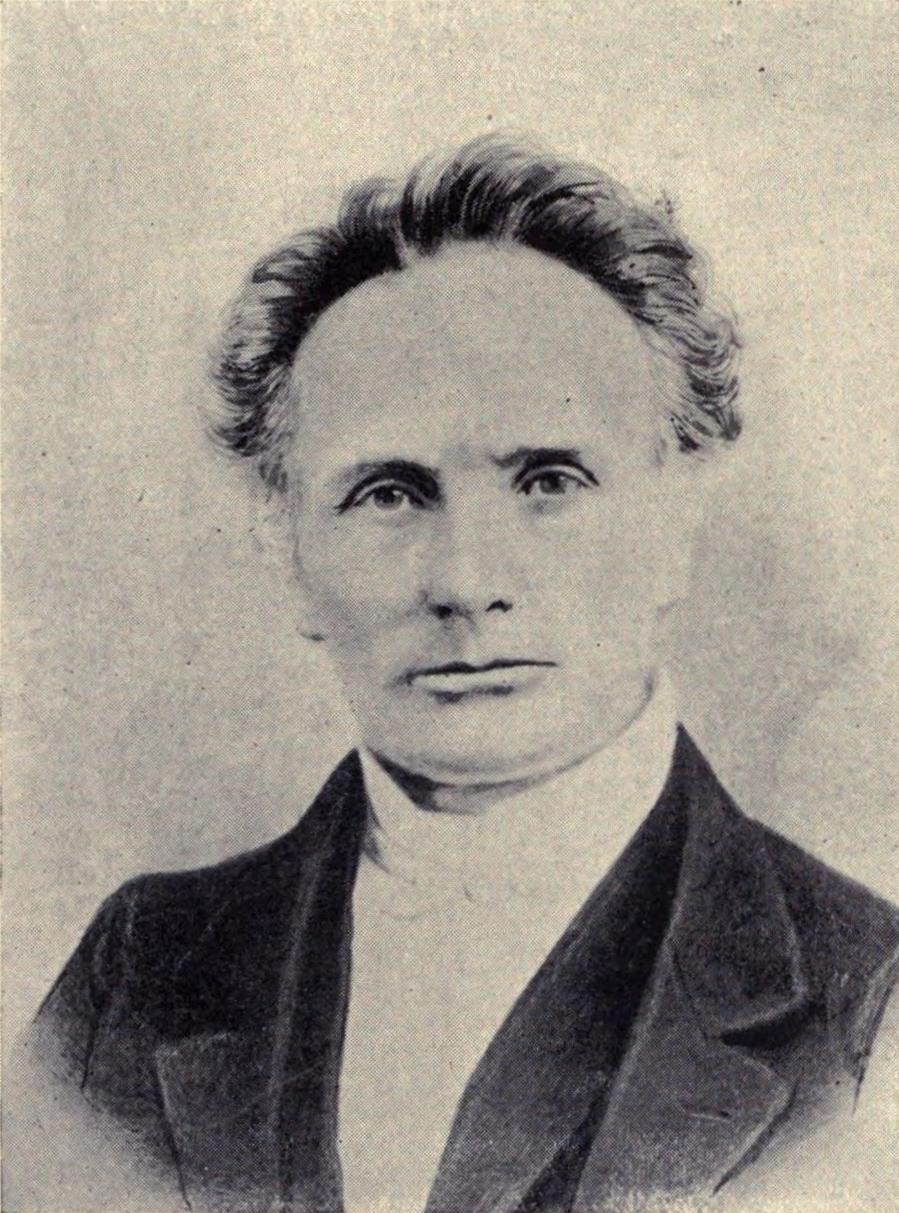
- Church builder on island of Hawaii
- Born: September 22, 1809; Staunton, Virginia
- Died: July 28, 1892 (aged 82); Nāpoʻopoʻo
- Spouses: Mary Grant; Mary Carpenter
- Children: Anna Matilda; Mary Aletta; Ellen Hudson; John Davis Jr.
- Parent(s): George Paris; Mary Hudson

John Davis Paris (September 22, 1809 – July 28, 1892) was an American Christian missionary to the island of Hawaii. Coming to the island by accident, he supervised construction of several historic churches, some of which survive today.

== Life ==
John Davis Paris was born on September 22, 1809, in Staunton, Virginia. His father was George Paris and his mother was Mary Hudson. He graduated from Hanover College in Indiana in 1833, and Bangor Theological Seminary in 1839. He married Mary Grant in October 1840, and they had two daughters: Anna Matilda (1843–1917) and Mary Aletta. Mary and John embarked in November 1840, and arrived in Honolulu on May 21, 1841, on the Gloucester, along with the ninth company sent by the American Board of Commissioners for Foreign Missions. Other members of this company included William Harrison Rice and Daniel Dole and their wives.

They and the Rice family had been assigned to the Oregon Territory, but were told that an uprising had wiped out the mission station there, so were advised to stay in Hawaii. The family was assigned to the remote southernmost station at Waiʻōhinu in the Kaʻū district of the island of Hawaiʻi. There Paris built the Kauahaʻao Church (named for a nearby spring).

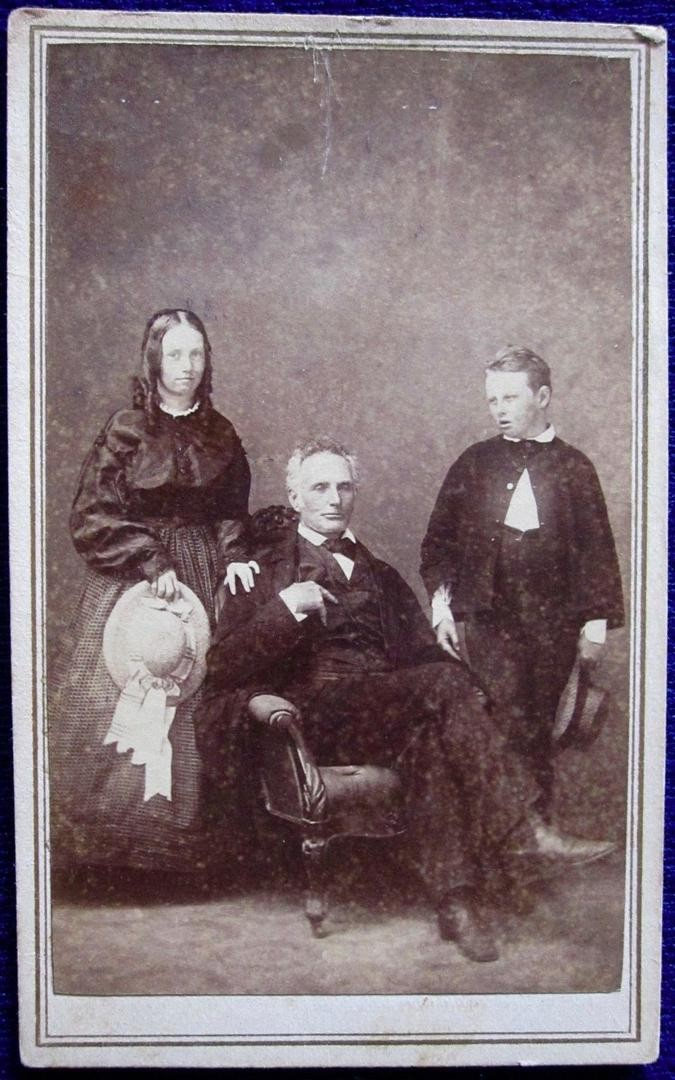
John Davis Paris with his youngest children

Mary Paris died in 1847, and John Paris returned to the United States with his two young daughters on the ship Montreal in 1849. In September 1851 Paris married Mary Carpenter (1815–1896) of New York. They decided to return to Hawaii, left in November and arrived in March 1852. This time he was posted to the slightly less remote Kona District on the same island. They had a daughter Ellen (known as Ella) Hudson (1852–1938) and a son John Davis, Jr. (1854–1918).

== Kona churches ==
A large stone church had been built in 1839 on land donated by Chiefess Kapiʻolani, in an area known as Kuapehu, inland from the town now known as Nāpoʻopoʻo, on the south end of Kealakekua Bay but it had fallen into ruin after six years without a pastor. Paris built a smaller but longer-lasting stone church called Kahikolu on the foundation of the old one. In the Hawaiian language kahikolu was the name for the Holy Trinity. He also rebuilt a house at a cooler, higher elevation which he called Mauna ʻAlani, on Kapiʻolani's former house site. A cistern and kitchen were completed in 1852, and a two-story house built of wood from mountain forests was finished in 1853. Paris also constructed a kiln to bake coral, which was made into lime mortar. This material would prove to be stronger than the previous materials. The workers trained in these new techniques were applied to more projects in the area.

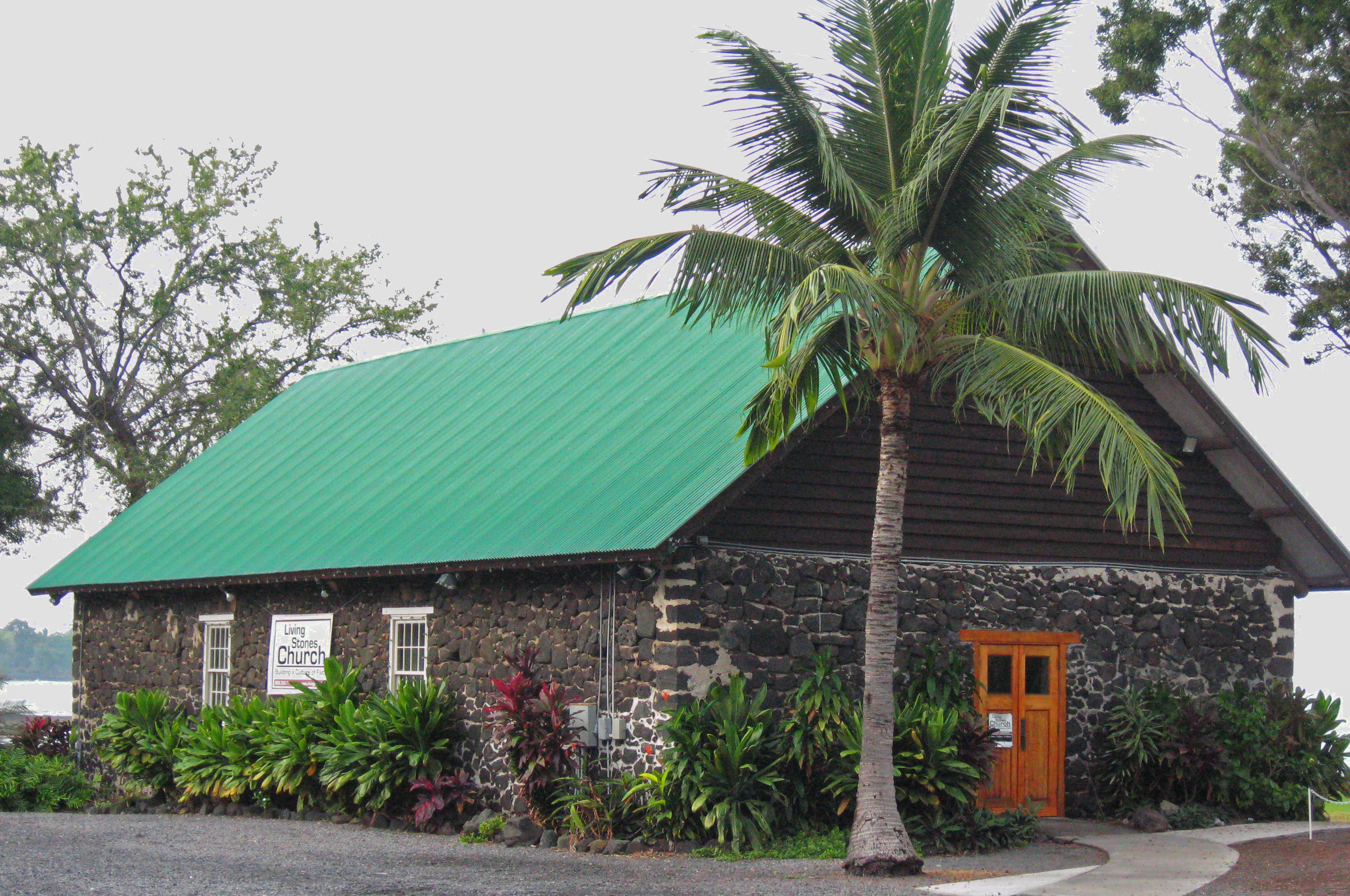
Hale Halawai O Holualoa

Paris supervised the construction of a smaller church known as Hale Halawai O Holualoa ("the meeting house at Holualoa", now known as "Living Stones Church") completed in 1855 on Holualoa Bay. He also had Helani Church built at Kahaluʻu Bay in 1861; this church was one of the first to use a native Hawaiian as a pastor. In 1863 he hosted Rufus Anderson from the American board, on a tour of the island's missions. Paris mentioned he was saddened by how the land was being bought up by outsiders.

Over his career Paris would be involved in the construction of several more churches, adapting his building materials to suit the location. Churches at higher elevations, such as Central Kona Union, Pukaʻana Church, and Mauna Ziona in North Kona, were made from wood instead of stone. His last church was Lanakila Church in Kainaliu, started in 1865 and completed in 1867. He is known as one of the most prolific church builders of his time.

In 1870 Paris and his wife moved to Honolulu, where he founded the theological department of the North Pacific Institute. In 1874 he retired and moved back to Kona, where his son had become a rancher. He died on July 28, 1892, in the same house, and is buried in the cemetery of the Lanakila Church in Kainaliu.

== Kaona uprising ==
In 1866, a well-educated native Hawaiian named Joseph Kaona had asked Paris to use the new Lanakila church to store some bibles. At first, Paris welcomed the help. Kaona had grown up in the area, and served in the government of the Kingdom of Hawaii as a district judge and in its House of Representatives in 1853. However, Kaona's erratic behavior alarmed Paris. Kaona claimed he was a prophet sent to warn of the end of the world. He predicted a lava flow would soon destroy everyone except his followers (called Kaonaites) after the earthquakes of April 1868. He had also predicted destruction a few earlier times, but after the appointed day passed, postponed it. Paris learned that Kaona had been sentenced to an asylum a few years earlier after claiming he could raise someone from the dead. Paris tried to lock the Lanakila Church, but the door fell off its hinges and Kaona claimed it was a miracle. When the Kaonaites occupied the church and refused to leave, a local judge ordered it closed and the occupiers evicted.

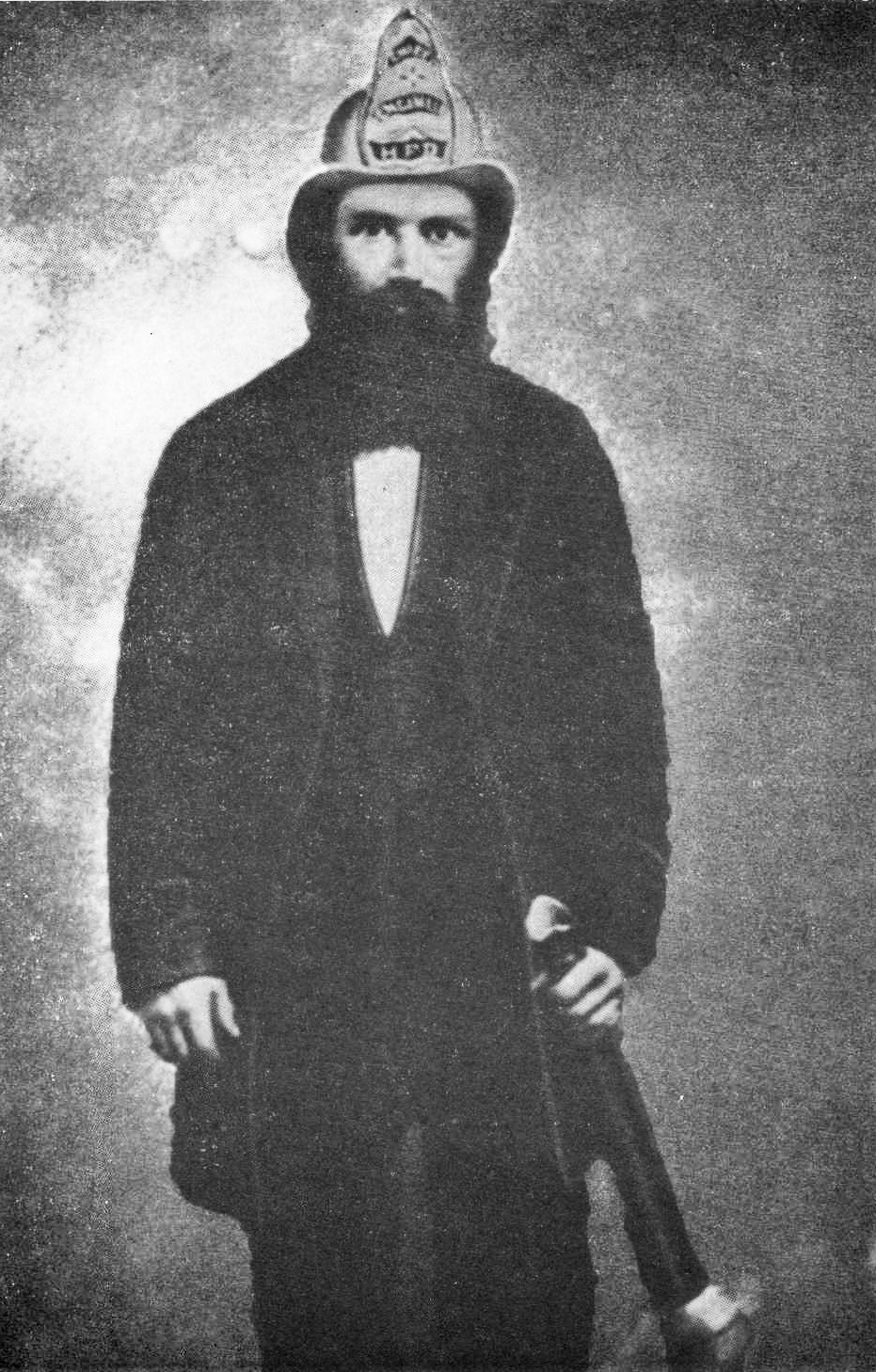
Sheriff R. B. Neville (here in his previous function as fire chief) died in the 1868 uprising

Kaona told people to withdraw their children from school and join him in a communal home at the shore. Kaona had his followers chant Psalm 150 for seven days while beating drums made from sugar kegs and tin pots. They wore white robes and flew seven banners because they thought the number seven to be mystical. Although they attempted to pay rent, William F. Roy, the lease-holder of the land asked them to leave. When Sheriff R. B. Neville tried to evict them on October 16, 1868, they refused. Neville had been fire chief of Honolulu, but moved to Kona for what he hoped would be a quieter life. On his second try, on October 19, Kaona's followers clubbed Neville to death. Kamai, a native constable was killed trying to retrieve Neville's body.

When word of the uprising reached Honolulu, John Owen Dominis was sent to the site with 200 troops. The Sheriff of Hilo, J. H. Coney, also arrived with about 200 men, and the two groups captured the Kaonaites. At Kaona's trial in May 1869, Albert Francis Judd and David Kalākaua were appointed for the defense, but Kaona used his oratorical skills to defend himself. His charge was reduced to manslaughter and he was sentenced to ten years of hard labor. Kaona was pardoned when Kalākaua became king in 1874; he returned to Kona and died in 1883.

== Legacy ==
Ella Hudson Paris translated many hymns into the Hawaiian language under the pen name "Hualalai" (for the nearby volcano Hualālai). The Kahikolu church has held an annual choral event since 1999 called ʻAha Mele O Hualalai in her honor.

Son John Davis II (also known as John Davis Jr.) married Hannah Johnson (1855–1938), the granddaughter of John Davis (nephew of Isaac Davis). Hannah's sister Mary married the wealthy Hilo businessman William Herbert Shipman, whose father had replaced the Paris family at Waiʻōhinu. The Johnson sisters were daughters of Eliza Johnson Roy (1821–1912), on whose property the Kaona followers were camped. John Jr. served in the Hawaii House of Representatives 1887–1898, and then the territorial Senate 1901–1905. Jack London visited the family in 1907, and mentions a Paris daughter showing the visitors the nearby historic sites.

The April 1868 earthquake, estimated to be the largest ever to hit Hawaii destroyed his church in Waiʻōhinu. Kahikolu Church was damaged on August 21, 1951, by an earthquake centered almost under the church. Kahikolu was abandoned in 1953 as a result of the damage, but reconstructed from 1982 to 1986, and re-opened in 1999. Kauahaʻao Church was rebuilt (with wood) in 1888, but demolished in April 1998. Victoria Nalani Kneubuhl has written a one-act play titled A Visit to Kalukalu which depicts Ella Hudson Paris visiting a local store in 1888, performed on location by the Kona Historical Society.

== See also ==
- List of Missionaries to Hawaii
