= Henry Opukahaia =

Early Hawaiian Christian convert (1792–1818)

Henry ʻŌpūkahaʻia
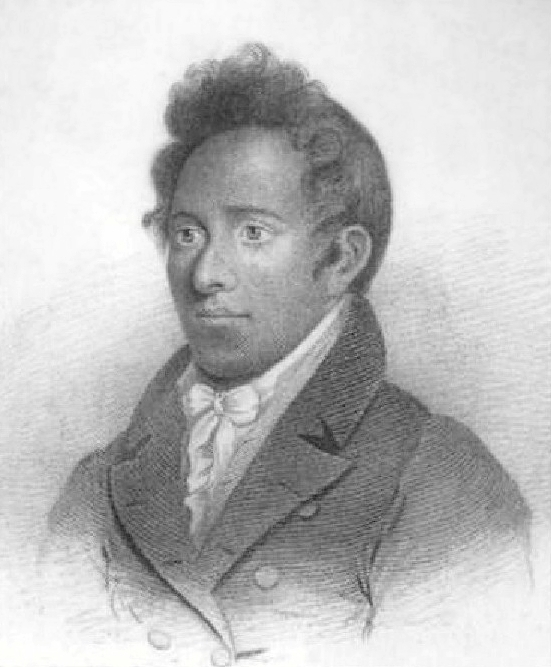
- Born: c. 1793; Nīnole, Hawaii
- Died: February 17, 1818; Cornwall, Connecticut
- Burial place: Napoʻopoʻo
- Parent(s): Keau and Kamohoula

Signature
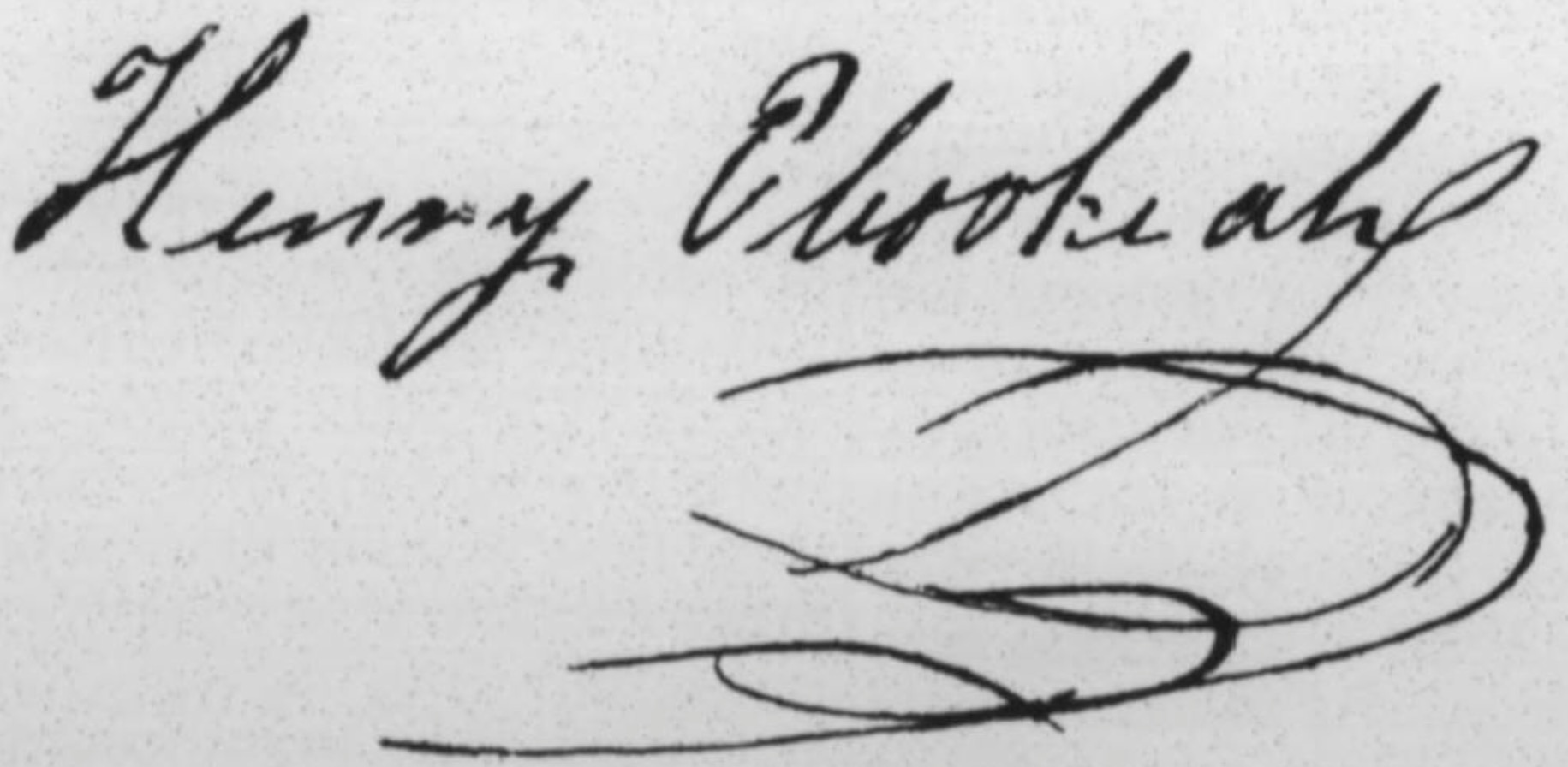

Henry ʻŌpūkahaʻia (c. 1792 – 1818) was one of the first Hawaiians to become a Christian, inspiring American Protestant missionaries to come to the islands during the 19th century. He is credited with starting Hawaii's conversion to Christianity. His name was usually spelled Obookiah during his lifetime. His name Henry is sometimes Hawaiianized as Heneri.

== Biography ==
ʻŌpūkahaʻia was born at Kaʻū on the island of Hawaiʻi in 1792. When he was 10, his family was murdered by the warriors of Kamehameha I during the rebellion of Nāmakehā. The 1866 Hawaiian biography by Reverend S. W. Papaula would state that ʻŌpūkahaʻia was born in 1787 instead.

In 1807, when Captain Caleb Britnall took him aboard the Triumph, the teenage boy had his first English lessons en route to New Haven, Connecticut, along with fellow Hawaiian cabin boy Thomas Hopu. As a student in the New Haven area, he was looked after in a succession of homes, and worked summers to help earn his keep. The future Reverend Edwin W. Dwight, a senior in Yale College at the time, met him in 1809 when he discovered ʻŌpūkahaʻia sitting on the steps of the college. When ʻŌpūkahaʻia lamented: "No one give me learning", Dwight agreed to help him find tutoring. ʻŌpūkahaʻia took up residence with one of Dwight's relatives, Yale president Timothy Dwight IV, a founder of the American Board of Commissioners for Foreign Missions, who instructed him in Christian and secular subjects. He had studied English grammar and the usual curriculum in public schools by the time he converted to Christianity in 1815, during the Second Great Awakening.

He and other Polynesians and Native Americans requested training to spread the Gospel back home. This inspired the founding of the Foreign Mission School in 1816, administered from Boston by the American Board of Commissioners for Foreign Missions (ABCFM). It had broad support from the residents of Cornwall, Connecticut, where it moved in 1817, and from donors elsewhere in Connecticut, Massachusetts, and New York. During its ten years, about 100 students attended: "43 Native Americans, 13 Americans (white), and 20 Hawaiians, and other natives of the Pacific. including 2 Chinese".

Even before this school opened, Edwin Dwight wrote in 1818, ʻŌpūkahaʻia had begun "'reducing to system his own native tongue. As it was not a written language, but lay in its chaotic state, every thing was to be done [...] he had made some progress towards completing a Grammar, a Dictionary, and a Spelling-book.'" However, these books no longer exist. Samuel B. Ruggles, one of the First Company of missionaries to Hawaii and a fellow student of ʻŌpūkahaʻia at Cornwall, mentions in an 1819 letter that his own grammar was "much assisted by one which ʻŌpūkahaʻia attempted to form." Elisha Loomis, who was to be the printer for the first mission, was inspired to join it by reading ʻŌpūkahaʻia's memoirs, edited by Dwight in the year of his death from typhus fever, over a year before the First Company set sail from Boston.

ʻŌpūkahaʻia planned to return to Hawaii himself to preach, but contracted typhus fever and died in 1818 in Cornwall at the age of 26.

Between 1824 and 1826, two young white women from Cornwall families married Cherokee students at the Foreign Mission School. Although some locals supported the young couples, the interracial marriages stoked great outrage among many townspeople, and in the ensuing controversy, the school was shuttered. However, both the school and ʻŌpūkahaʻia were a catalyst for the Sandwich Island Mission and for the first concentrated efforts to analyze the language.

== Re-interment ==
In 1993, some descendants of ʻŌpūkahaʻia's family decided to return his body from his grave in Connecticut to Hawaii. On Aug. 15, 1993, his remains were laid in a vault facing the sea at Kahikolu Church near the town of Napoʻopoʻo, Kona, on the Island of Hawaii. It was the third church established in Hawaii by missionaries inspired by Opukahaʻia. Hawaii's churches observe the third Sunday in February as a day of commemoration in honor of its first Christian. A plaque at the Cornwall gravesite reads: "In July of 1993, the family of Henry Opukahaia took him home to Hawaii for interment at Kahikolu Congregational Church Cemetery, Napo'opo'o, Kona, Island of Hawaii. Henry's family expresses gratitude, appreciation, and love to all who cared for and loved him throughout the past years. Ahahui O Opukahaia".

== Works ==
Besides translating the Book of Genesis into Hawaiian, ʻŌpūkahaʻia nearly completed a Hawaiian dictionary, grammar, and spelling book. The Memoirs of Henry Obookiah were published in New York City in 1818 and have been republished by the Woman's Board of Missions for the Pacific Islands several times since the 1960s. They have recently republished the 195-year-old book with a new epilogue of how his body was returned to the Big Island of Hawaii, along with new photographs.
