= Kahikolu Church =

Church building in Honaunau-Napoopoo, Hawaii

- U.S. National Register of Historic Places
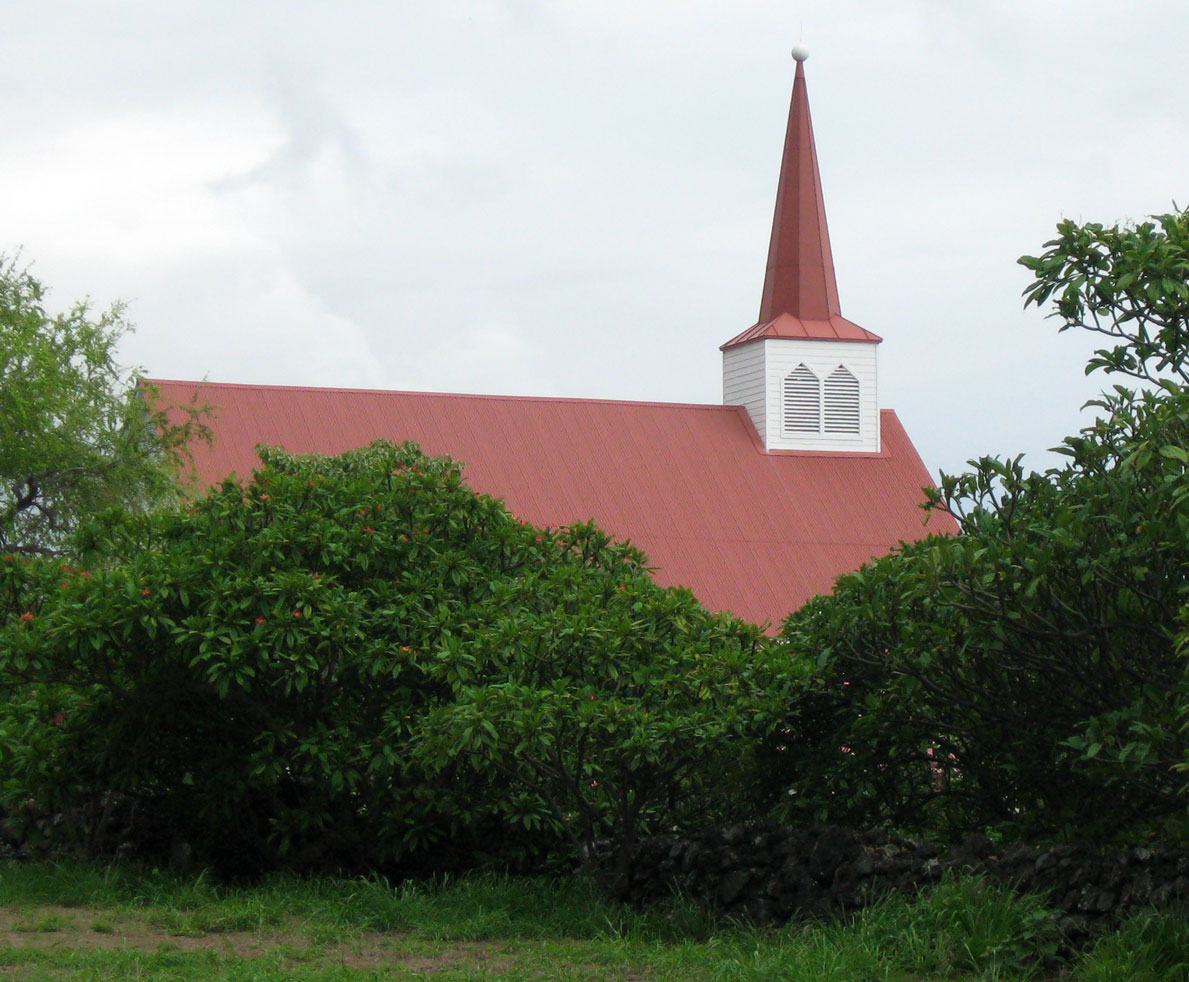
- The restored church in use today

- Location within Hawaii
- Nearest city: Napoʻopoʻo, Hawaii
- Coordinates: 19°28′10″N 155°54′55″W
- Area: 2.6 acres (1.1 ha)
- Built: 1855
- Architect: John D. Paris
- NRHP reference No.: 82000148
- Added to NRHP: November 15, 1982

Kahikolu Church is one of only two stone churches from the 19th century on the island of Hawaii. It was built from 1852 to 1855 on the site of an earlier building known as Kealakekua Church that was built around 1833 in the Kona district.

== History ==
English missionary William Ellis (1794–1872) toured the island in the summer of 1823 to determine locations for mission stations and suggested the village of Kaʻawaloa at the north end of Kealakekua Bay as one of the first sites for a church.

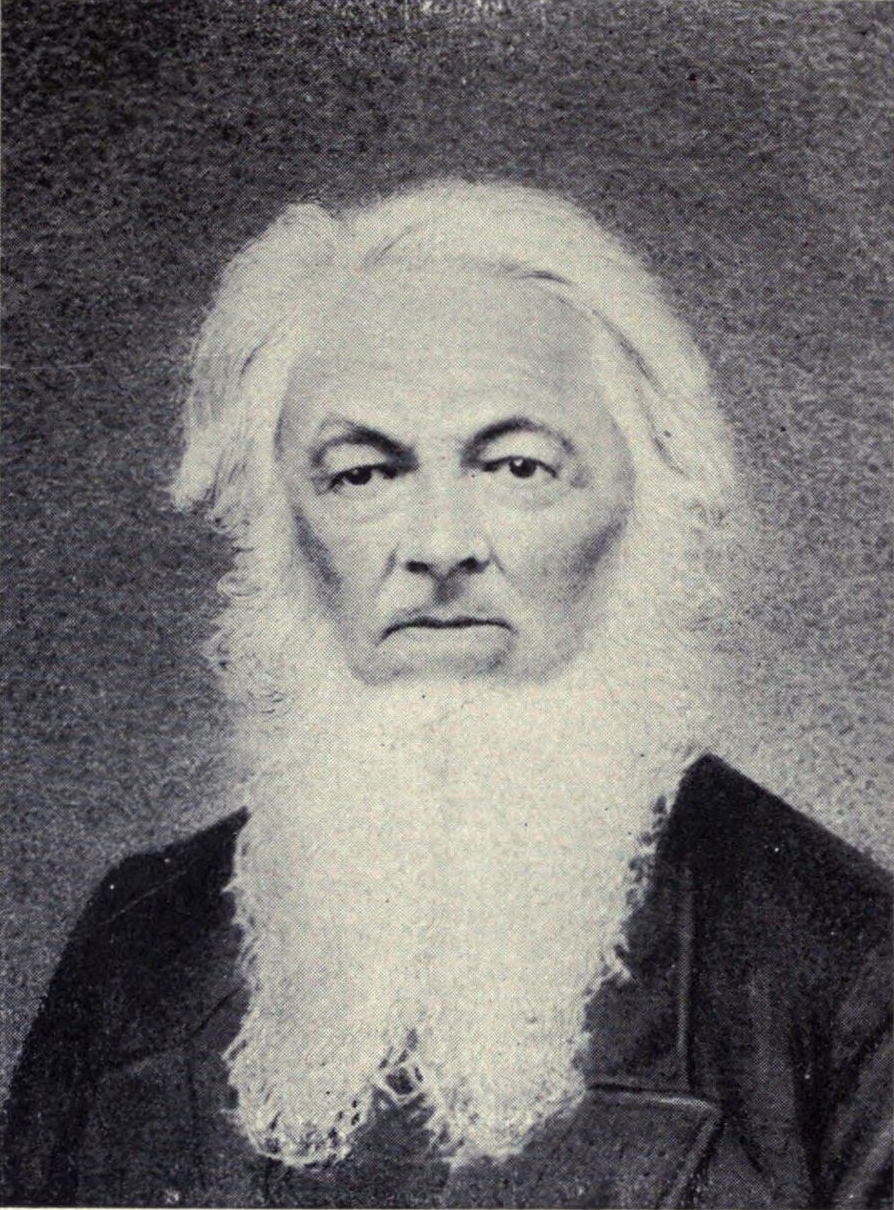
Samuel Ruggles, pastor in 1828

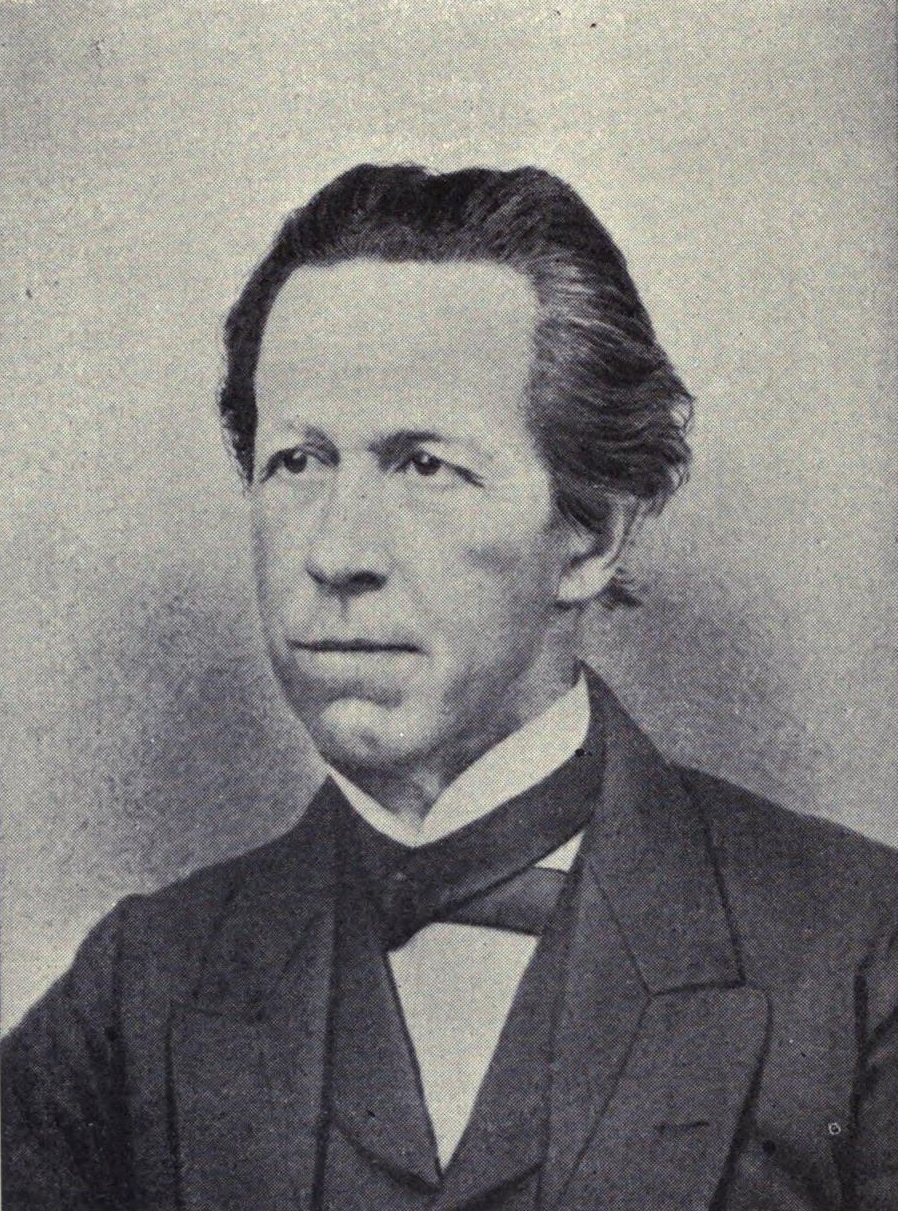
Cochran Forbes built 1839 church

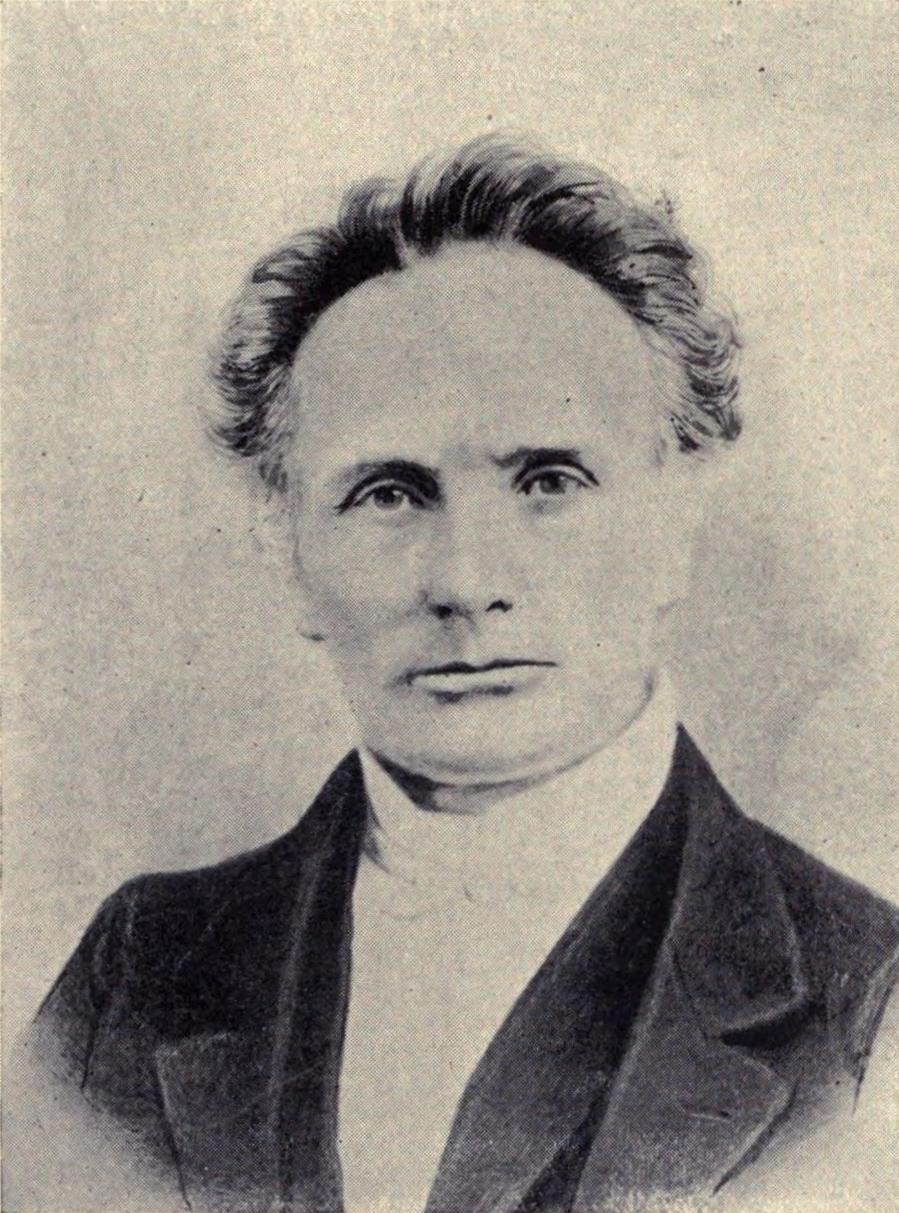
John D. Paris built Kahikolu church

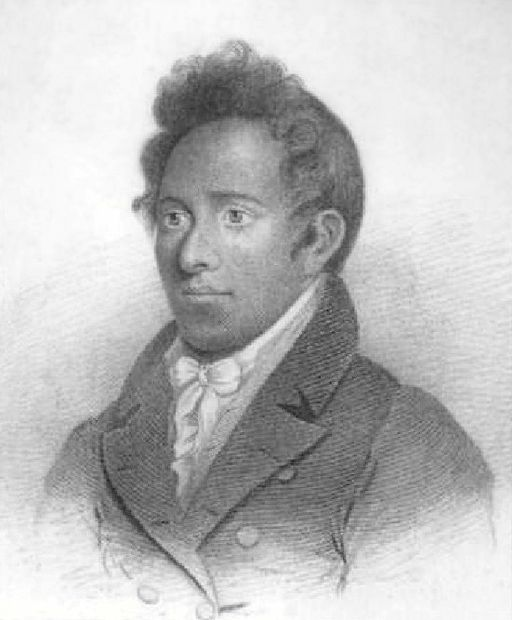
Henry Obookiah, credited with bringing Christianity to Hawai'i, was reinterred from his Connecticut grave to Kahikolu Church in 1993.

In February 1824 High Chiefess Kapiʻolani built a thatched house in the village of Kaʻawaloa for use as a Christian church by Rev. James Ely (1798–1890) and his family. Ely left Kaʻawaloa in 1828, replaced by Rev. Samuel Ruggles (1795–1871), who brought some coffee trees with him from the Hilo mission. Ruggles was replaced due to ill health in June 1833 by Rev. Cochran Forbes (1805–1880). Forbes built a house at a cooler elevation, at a site called Kuapehu which had been used to grow taro. In 1839, under the direction of Kapiʻolani, Forbes moved the mission to the south side of Kealakekua Bay, in an area called Kepulu, just inland from the village now called Nāpoʻopoʻo. Another house was built here, and a church which was 120 feet (37 m) by 57 feet (17 m) of stone and coral lime. In 1841 the Kealakekua Church was finished, and used until June 1845, when Forbes resigned because of his wife's ill health.

After six years with no pastor, Rev. John Davis Paris (1809–1892) arrived in 1852. His family had been at Waiʻōhinu for several years, returned to the United States, and then came back to the island and were posted to the Kealakekua congregation. He found the large old church in ruins. He set about building a more solid but smaller stone church called Kahikolu on the site of the old one. Kahikolu means "three in one" in the Hawaiian language, which refers both to the Holy Trinity of the Christian faith, but also that it was the third attempt to build a church here. The width of the old church became the length of the new one, resulting in a building about 57 feet (17 m) by 62 feet (19 m), with walls 35 inches (89 cm) thick.

Kahikolu took three years to build, and included a bell donated by William E. Dodge of New York. It could hold a total of about 1200 people. Paris went on to build eight more churches (including Hale Halawai O Holualoa), and died in the area in 1892. There are grave sites located on both sides of the church, some of which are unmarked. Several bear the name of "Kamakau", probably descendants of a chief Kelou Kamakau, born about 1773 who was mentioned in Ellis' journal as a good source of history.

== Decline and restoration ==
In 1925 a layer of plaster was added to the inside walls, and the ceiling and floor replaced. In 1929, an earthquake caused one of the gable ends to tumble into the church. They were replaced with horizontal wood strips. Once the largest church on the west side of the island, its influence declined as population moved to other areas. On August 21, 1951, an earthquake with magnitude 6.9 was centered almost under the church. The roof collapsed after more earthquakes in 1952 and 1953. The stone church was abandoned in 1953 due to the damage.

Kahikolu church was added to the National Register of Historic Places listings on the island of Hawaii on November 15, 1982 as site 82000148, and the state list as site 10-47-7215 on July 30, 1982. The only other stone church from this era on the island is Mokuaikaua Church, about 12 miles (19 km) to the north. P A rebuilding effort lasted through the 1980s. Kahikolu Church restoration was completed around 1984.

In 1993, the body of one of the first native Hawaiians to become a Christian, Henry Ōpūkaha`ia', was reinterred at Kahikolu Church. Ōpūkaha`ia' is credited (or blamed, depending on the speaker's perspective) with starting Hawaii's conversion to Christianity and had travelled from Hawai'i's Big Island by way of Connecticut to Yale University in 1809 where he studied English and Christianity and planned to return to Hawaii himself to preach. He contracted typhus fever and died in 1818 in Cornwall at the age of 26. `Ōpūkaha`ia's family decided to return his body from his grave in Connecticut to Hawaii. On Aug. 15, 1993, his remains were laid in a vault facing the sea at Kahikolu Church. It was the third church established in Hawaii by missionaries inspired by Opukahaʻia. Hawaii's churches observe the third Sunday in February as a day of commemoration in honor of its first Christian. A plaque at the Cornwall gravesite reads: "In July of 1993, the family of Henry Opukahaia took him home to Hawaii for interment at Kahikolu Congregational Church Cemetery, Napo'opo'o, Kona, Island of Hawaii. Henry's family expresses gratitude, appreciation and love to all who cared for and loved him throughout the past years. Ahahui O Opukahaia". The church was finally restored and opened again for use in 1999. A historical marker was added in 2003.

The address of the congregation is 82-5931 Napo'opo'o Road, Captain Cook, Hawaii 96704. Sunday services are held at 9:30 am with Sunday School at 8:30. The pastor (as of July 2011) is Wendell Davis. In November 2003, under the urging of pastor Davis, Kahikolu Congregational Church voted to disaffiliate from the United Church of Christ because of the UCC "open and affirming" ordination of practising gay and lesbian pastors. The members were considering leaving the UCC but have not actually done so as of 2013.

The variety of coffee Ruggles brought in 1828 thrived in the part of the island around Kealakekua, called the Kona District. Because it was the first coffee grown on the western side of the island, it is often referred to as the first Kona coffee, still popular today.

== See also ==
- Coffee production in Hawaii
- List of Missionaries to Hawaii
