= Anna Ranch Heritage Center =

Historic Place in Hawaii County, Hawaii

- Anna Ranch
- U.S. National Register of Historic Places
- Hawaiʻi Register of Historic Places
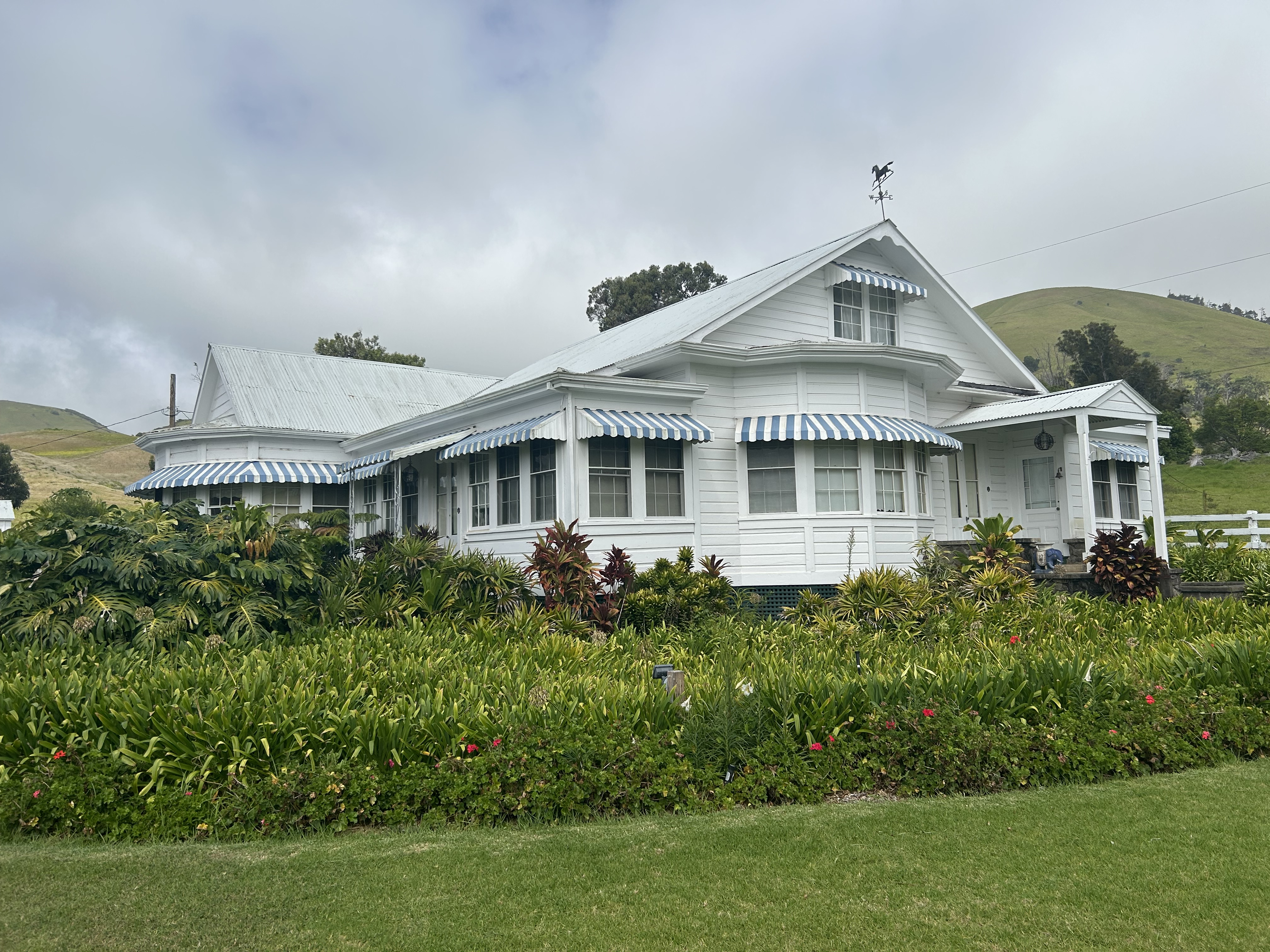

- Location within Hawaii
- Location: 65-1480 Kawaihae Road, Waimea, Hawaii County, Hawaii
- Area: 3.5 acres (1.4 ha)
- Built: 1910–1930
- NRHP reference No.: 06001120
- Added to NRHP: April 28, 2008

Anna Ranch Heritage Center, formerly called and commonly known as Anna Ranch or Lindsey Ranch, is a former cattle ranch and current museum in Waimea, Hawaii.

It is named for Anna Leialoha Lindsey Perry-Fiske (1900–1995).

== Early history ==
The ranch began in the early 19th century when an Englishman James Fay (c. 1778–1858) married a native Hawaiian woman Kaʻipukaikapuokamehameha Kahahana about 1828. Their daughter Mary Kaʻala Fay (1830–1886) had 12 children. Her second marriage was to George Kynaston Lindsey (1832–1872), who bought the land in 1858. Their oldest son Thomas Weston Lindsey (1855–1912), married Beke Fredenberg and had eight children. Thomas' oldest son William Miller Seymour Lindsey (1875–1939) married Mary Leialoha Rose. Their only daughter was Anna Leialoha.

Anna Lindsey first moved to Hilo, Hawaii, but divorced her first husband Henry Lai Hipp in 1939 and moved back to the ranch to manage it. The business was heavily in debt, so she performed most of the work herself. In 1943 Anna Lindsey married James Lyman Perry-Fiske. Atypically for the time, she managed the ranch until her death in 1995. In 1968 Anna was named “Career Woman of the Year” by the Hawai’i Federation of Business and Professional Women. In 1983 she was credited as the biggest individual contributor to the Hawaii American Heart Association chapter. In 2009 she became a member of the Paniolo Hall of Fame.

Major buildings include a ranch house, slaughter house, barn and garage constructed between 1910 and 1930. The preserved ranch house and outbuildings have become a historic house museum. After being restored to 1939 condition, the house was opened for tours in September 2007. It was listed as site 06001120 on the National Register of Historic Places listings on the island of Hawaii April 28, 2008. It is located on Hawaii Belt Road (state Route 19, also called Kawaihae Road at this point) at coordinates 20°1′36″N 155°41′11″W.

== See also ==
- Contributing property
- Cultural landscape
- Historic preservation
- Keeper of the Register
- List of heritage registers
- Property type (National Register of Historic Places)
- United States National Register of Historic Places listings
- State Historic Preservation Office
