= Bond District =

- U.S. National Register of Historic Places
- U.S. Historic district
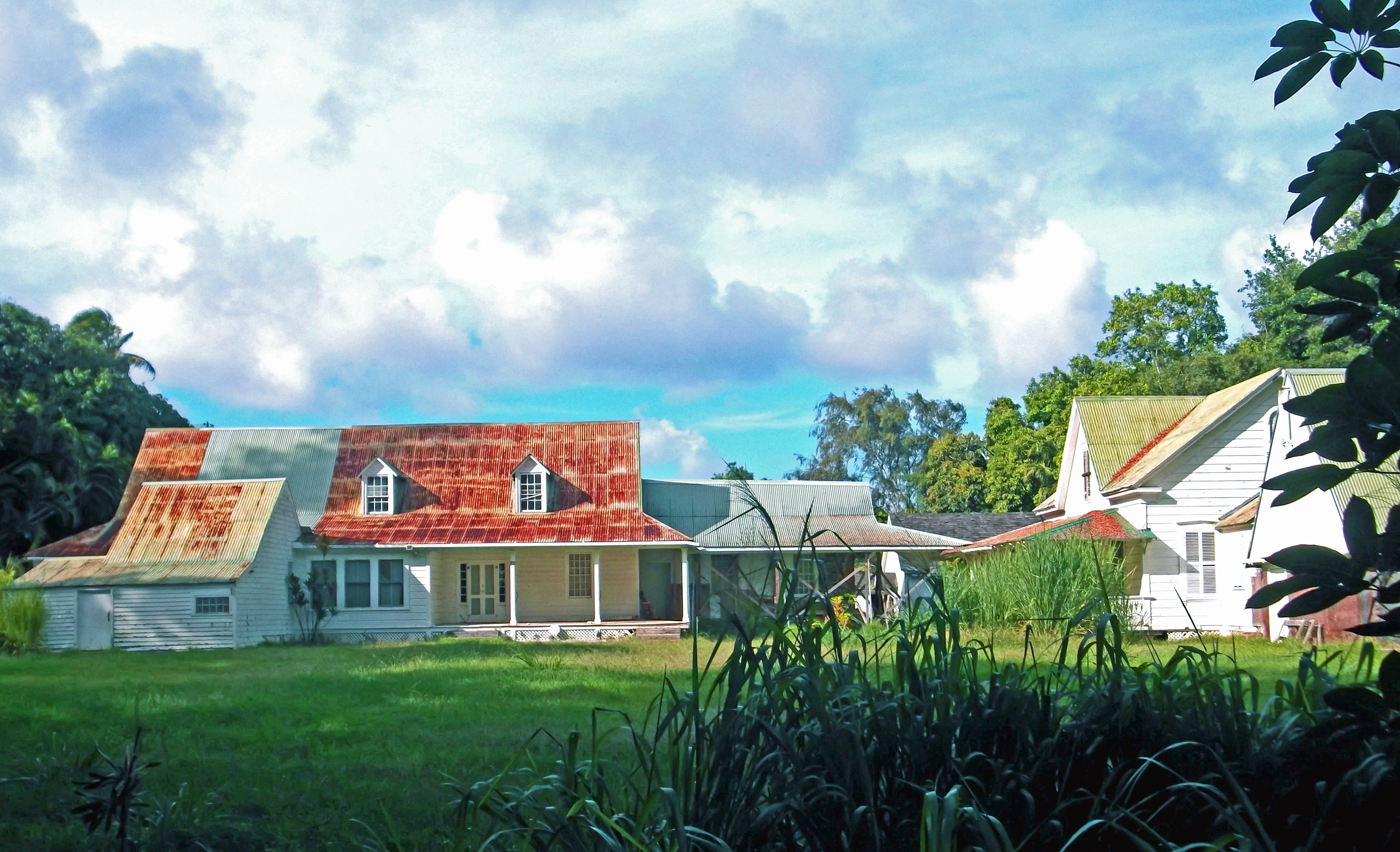
- Homestead in 2012

- Location within Hawaii
- Nearest city: Kapaʻau, Hawaii
- Coordinates: 20°13′33″N 155°47′33″W
- Area: 61.8 acres (25.0 ha)
- Built: 1844
- Architect: Isaac Bliss, Elias Bond
- NRHP reference No.: 78001016
- Added to NRHP: March 30, 1978

Elias Bond
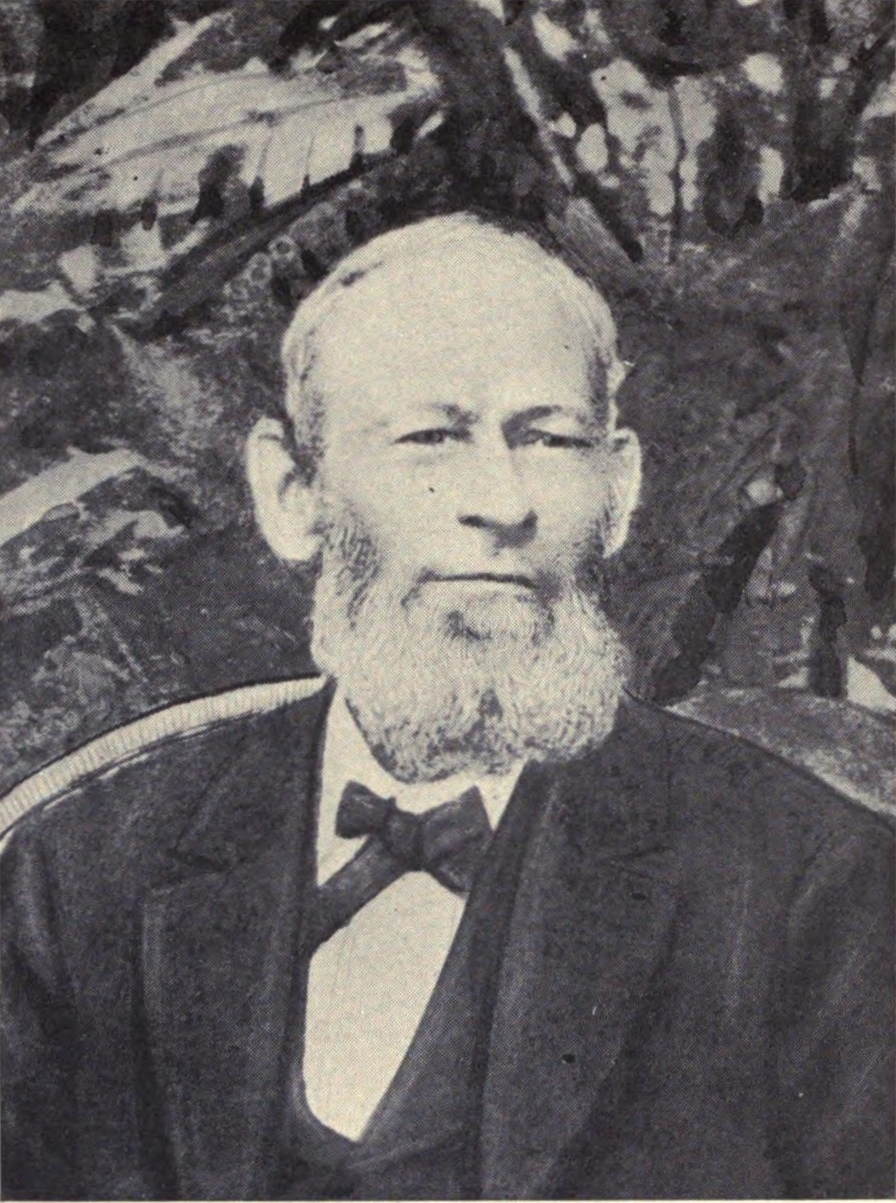
- Born: August 19, 1813; Hallowell, Maine
- Died: July 24, 1896 (aged 82); Hilo, Hawaii
- Occupations: Missionary, Teacher
- Spouse: Ellen Mariner Howell
- Children: 9
- Parent(s): Elias Bond; Rebecca Davis

The Bond District is a collection of historic buildings located in the district of North Kohala on the island of Hawaii. The district has three sections: the homestead of missionaries Ellen and Reverend Elias Bond (1813–1896), Kalahikiola Church, and the Kohala Seminary.

== Ellen and Elias Bond ==
Elias Bond was born in Hallowell, Maine on August 19, 1813. His father was also named Elias Bond (1774–1864), son of Colonel William Bond who served in the American Revolutionary War, and his mother was Rebecca Davis. He graduated from Bowdoin College in Maine in 1837, and from Bangor Theological Seminary in 1840. He married Ellen Mariner Howell September 29, 1840 in Hallowell, Maine and was ordained the following day. The Bonds had 11 children born in Hawaii (but only 9 lived to adulthood). Mrs. Bond died May 12, 1881, and Reverend Bond died July 24, 1896.

The Bonds sailed on the ship Gloucester from Boston November 14, 1840 with the Ninth Company from the American Board of Commissioners for Foreign Missions. The ship arrived in Honolulu in May 1841 where he observed the construction of Kawaiahaʻo Church. They were assigned a remote outpost on the northern coast of the Big Island of Hawaiʻi, in the area known as the Kohala district.

=== Bond House ===
An earlier missionary to Kohala, Reverend Isaac Bliss (1804–1851), had just completed building the main house for the homestead compound when the Bonds arrived in June 1841. Bond described it as made from "native wood and plaster on stone foundation with a good cellar." By 1842 he had expanded it to about 40 feet (12 m) by 36 feet (11 m).

The next addition was built of stonework similar to the Kawaiahaʻo Church. The fieldstones were held together with burned coral mortar, to add a wash house, foundations for a woodshed and carpenter sheds, an archway, and courtyard walls, all around a large open space. Around 1845 a kitchen wing was added, with a stone foundation and wooden walls.

By 1848 the Foreign Missions Board wanted to reduce its financial support, so Bond offered to forego a salary if they would let him have the house which he had improved. Instead, the Board asked him to pay them $500 for it. But because of the changes in property law called the Mahele, Bond legally took personal title to the house. He would eventually expand the homestead and buy about 1,400 acres (570 ha) of the ancient land division (ahupuaʻa) called ʻIole. Leases from farmers on the land provided a steady source of income.

In 1853 another wing was added to the house, about 40 feet (12 m) by 20 feet (6.1 m). Masonry walls were finished with lime plaster inside and out. At various times a workshop, other outbuildings and a lily pond were added. The original thatched roofs were replaced by corrugated metal.

His son Benjamin Davis Bond (January 21, 1853 – November 2, 1930) finished medical school at the University of Michigan in 1882, and returned to live in the homestead. A doctor's office was attached to the house in 1884 for his practice. In 1889 Dr. Bond married Emma Mary Renton (1866–1951), and a wood-framed cottage was added at the east end of the main house for them.

A small shed was expanded to shelter a horse carriage and single horse stall, to be ready for emergency medical calls.

Around 1900, the family added modern bathrooms, servants' quarters, and larger stables. A rock-crusher and power-house first produced gravel for paving the roads of the estate from their own quarry, and then was converted to process macadamia nuts grown on the property.

== Kalahikiola Church ==
The first building for Christian missionaries in Kohala was a thatched hut in an area called Nunulu, 20°12′13″N 155°49′21″W, built by Bliss in 1837, which was destroyed by a storm in 1840. The second thatched structure built on the present Kalahikiola site, called the ʻIole mission station, was repaired by Bond, and replaced with a wooden framed building in 1846. That was also demolished by high winds in 1849. The congregation would take five years to build a sturdier structure. Kalahikiola Church, dedicated on October 11, 1855, was made from stone and mortar entirely by hand. The main structure is a rectangle about 40 feet (12 m) by 80 feet (24 m), with a 16-foot (4.9 m) square wooden tower that was added about 1858.

The Kalahikiola church was built a bit further south past the Bond homestead, at 53-540 Iole Road - off of Akoni Pule Highway 20°13′20″N 155°47′39″W. The name comes from ka lā hiki ola meaning roughly "the day of salvation approaches" in the Hawaiian language. It was also called the "Kohala Hawaiian Church" since services were held in the Hawaiian language until 1950. The first church to offer services in English was called the "Foreign Church".

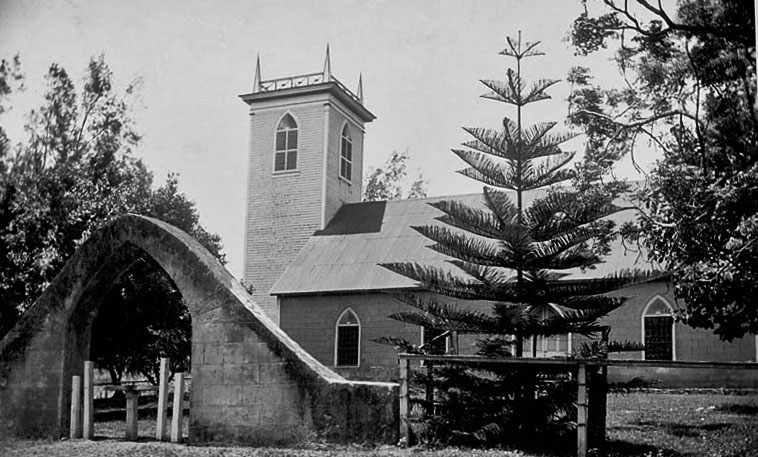
Kalahikiola Church near the end of the 19th century

However, by the time the church was finished, the congregation was shrinking due to epidemics and emigration of laborers to employment outside the district. Since Bond personally owned the land, he formed his own "Kohala Sugar Plantation", also known as the "Missionary Sugar Plantation" to support his efforts in 1862, and employ locals. He convinced the company Castle & Cooke, founded by former American Missionaries, to buy 3,000 acres (1,200 ha). The first sugarcane crop was harvested in 1865, and by 1867 it adopted a less authoritarian management style, compared to other sugar plantations in Hawaii that had slave-like conditions. The mill was built downhill from the homestead, in an area known as halaʻulu, 20°14′3″N 155°46′41″W. By the 1880s the profits made him the largest contributor to the support of other missions. The plantation was finally shut down in 1973.

Also in 1973, an earthquake caused cracks in many of the masonry foundations and walls, but the building was repaired. The church suffered even more major damage after the 2006 Kiholo Bay earthquake; one wall was reduced to a pile of rubble. Governor Linda Lingle met with members of the church at the site in a tour of the damage.

The congregation decided to rebuild, using an insurance settlement and donations. Construction finally began in November 2008, more than two years after the damage. The 30-inch (76 cm) thick walls were replaced with concrete blocks covered in plaster to resemble the older irregular stones.

As of 2009 the senior Minister was the Rev. George W. Baybrook

== Kohala Seminary ==
Originally the Bonds operated separate boys and girls schools. The boys constructed their own thatched structure, and Mrs. Bond taught the girls in the house. After raising about $2500 in 1873, work was begun under carpenter D.F. Stanford on a site just uphill and inland from the church, 20°13′15″N 155°47′46″W. The girls' boarding school called the Kohala Seminary had its first class in December 1874 with 13 students. Elizabeth M. Lyons, daughter of Lorenzo Lyons of the Imiola Church in Waimea, served as first principal. She named the school "Mauna Oliva" after the Mount of Olives. In September 1878, about 30 of the 57 students contracted typhoid fever, and only 47 were able to continue the year. An additional classroom building was added, with the original building turned into a dormitory. In 1886 Lyons was forced to return and care for her father, and another epidemic reduced enrollment.

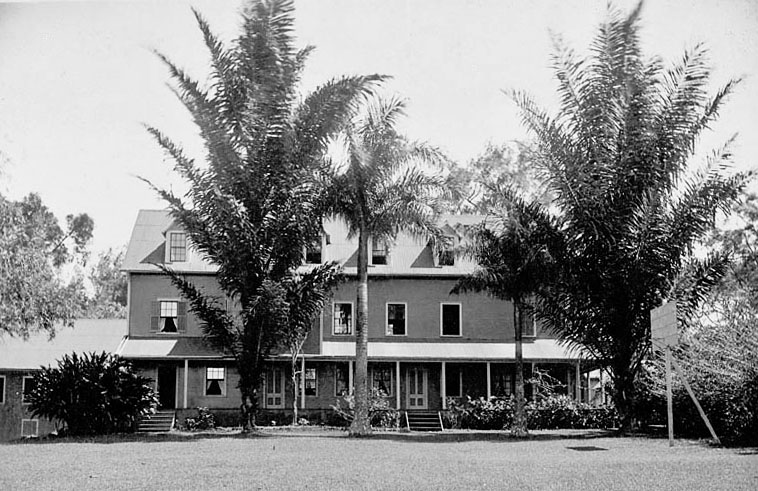
The dormitory near the end of the 19th century

The school was briefly closed, but opened again in 1887 under the Hawaiian Evangelical Association. The curriculum slowly evolved from preparing students to be wives and mothers, to instead be teachers or other professionals. Enrollment grew, as a high school diploma offered better employment opportunities near the end of the 19th century. Additional wings were added in 1890 and 1891, and it was remodeled after a fire in 1894. It was known as the "Select School for Girls" because of its high standards. However, after Kamehameha Schools opened a girls school in 1894, it raised the question if the Kohala Seminary was still needed. However, Kamehameha Schools only accepted Native Hawaiians, and its Hawaii island campus would not open until 2001. In 1926, the dormitory was used for girls at the new public Kohala High School. In 1956 it was finally closed, and used only for rare private functions and rental units.

== Preservation ==
Benjamin Bond closed his medical practice in 1925 and moved to Hilo, Hawaii. Other children born at the homestead were Ellen Mariner Bicknell (1841–1922), George Shepard Bond (1844–1917), Elias Cornelius Bond (1846–1918), Thomas Spencer Bond (1849–1883), William Lee Bond (1851–1925), Caroline Sophia (1854–1943), Julia Page Bond (1857–1938), and Abbie Steele Bond (1859–1943). The Bond family is buried in Waianaia Cemetery.

By 1967, the school was re-acquired by the Bond family from the church, since it was not being used and had fallen into disrepair. On July 22, 1977, the district was listed as the state of Hawaii historic site 10-02-7100, and on March 30, 1978, added as site 78001016 to the National Register of Historic Places listings on the island of Hawaii. After all the children of Elias and Ellen Bond died, some grandchildren preserved the house with its original furnishings and used it as a retreat. Its remote location made it unique: the only missionary station in Hawaii to be owned by one family for over 150 years.

Land was donated July 19, 1927 by Caroline S. Bond for the Kohala public library, named the "Bond Memorial Library". A small 1,610-square-foot (150 m^{2}) building from 1929 was replaced by a larger one constructed in 2009. Descendant Dorothy Bond was the first librarian. The estate was purchased in 1999 by the New Moon Foundation. After spending several years stabilizing and restoring the buildings, their plans for an educational center were delayed because of the 2006 earthquake damage.As of 2010 some trails were open to the public in the area.
