= Anne Lindsay =

Anne Lindsay or Lindsey may refer to:

- Lady Anne Barnard, née Anne Lindsay, writer and socialite
- Anne Crawford-Lindsay, noblewoman
- Anne Lindsey, fictional character in Highlander
- Anne Lindsay; see Fuse (radio program)

== See also ==
- Anna Robertson Brown Lindsay, academic
- Anna Lindsay (activist) (1845–1903), Scottish women's activist
