= Ainahou Ranch =

Historic house in Hawaii, United States

- U.S. National Register of Historic Places
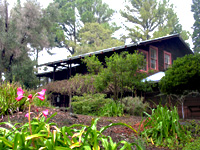
- The house at Ainahou Ranch

- Location within Hawaii
- Location: Off Chain of Craters Road in Hawaii Volcanoes National Park
- Coordinates: 19°20′37″N 155°13′44″W
- Area: less than one acre
- Built: 1941
- Architectural style: Bungalow/Craftsman
- NRHP reference No.: 94001619
- Added to NRHP: February 8, 1995

The Shipman family leased 6,324 acres (2,559 ha) of land near the Kīlauea volcano in 1937 from the Bernice Pauahi Bishop Estate, which they called the Ainahou Ranch. The name ʻaina hou means "new land". An older ranch called Keauhou (not to be confused with the community of Keauhou, on the western side of the island) had been established here in 1921, so a primitive trail existed, and the Chain of Craters Road had recently been built within a few miles. Herbert C. Shipman built a house on the remote ranch in 1941 for the family as a refuge for the anticipated Japanese invasion of Hawaii. It was used as a working cattle ranch, raising beef for the military during World War II.

After a tsunami in 1946 devastated the Puna Shipman property, killing half the endangered nēnē he was raising there, he built pens at Ainahou to continue raising them. After the war, it was estimated only about 30 birds existed in the wild. Herbert Shipman reintroduced two pairs to the Pohakuloa Training Area, and worked with British ornithologist Peter Scott to expand the breeding program to England, possibly saving the species from extinction. The Shipman family also kept many exotic plants at the ranch, including some of the first orchids raised on the island. Herbert (president of the Hawaii Orchid Society) was awarded a gold medal in 1957 by the American Orchid Society for contributions to the industry.

After being threatened by a lava flow in 1969, the house was evacuated. The family reached an agreement for the National Park Service to purchase the land and house in 1971 to become part of Hawaii Volcanoes National Park, under the authority of the Endangered Species Act. Ainahou ranch was listed on the state register of historic places on December 5, 1973, as site 10-62-19429, and the National Register of Historic Places listings on the island of Hawaii on June 23, 1978, as site 78001013. and the National Register of Historic Places listings on the island of Hawaii on February 8, 1995, as site 94001619.
