= Sadie Seymour Botanical Gardens =

Nonprofit botanical gardens in Hawaiʻi island, Hawaiʻi

The Sadie Seymour Botanical Gardens (1.5 acres) are nonprofit botanical gardens located on the grounds of the Kona Educational Foundation Center at 76-6280 Kuakini Highway, Kailua-Kona, Hawaiʻi island, Hawaiʻi. Coordinates are 19°36′49.5″N 155°58′6″W. They are open daily except on weekends; admission is free, but donations accepted.

Sadie Seymour (1907–1975) founded the outdoor circle to beautify the Kona community. The gardens were designed by landscape architect Scott Seymour on a wedge-shaped plot, and named in honor of his mother. They feature the cultivated plants of Hawaiʻi, arranged in 11 tiers by geographic origin. The first tier contains native Hawaiian plants. Other tiers include Australia, New Zealand, and Indonesia (featuring plants such as cuphea, eucalyptus, and ixora); Indo-Asia (lemon grass, and cinnamon, turmeric, and clove trees); Africa (Bismarckia nobilis); and Central America (calabash).

The grounds also contain an archaeological site called a Heiau, Kealakowaʻa Heiau ("temple on the way for dragging canoes" in the Hawaiian Language). This ritual site, built in the time of King ʻUmi a Liloa, was used for construction and blessing of canoes. It can be viewed from the Kona Educational Foundation Center. The site contains a ceremonial platform, an astrological temple, the foundation of a priest's house, and the foundation of a meeting house. The sacred site is positioned along an ancient trail (Holua Loa means "long slide") that led from the upland Koa forests on Hualālai down to the royal complex at Holualoa Bay. After a tree was selected in the forest, the log was roughly hewn into the shape of a canoe and dragged down to this area for blessing ceremonies. From here it went down the slide to the water for completion and launching.

== See also ==
- List of botanical gardens in the United States
