= Anna Lindsey =

Hawai'i County Parks Commissioner
- In office c. 1950 – c. 1970

Personal details
- Born: February 2, 1900 Hilo, Territory of Hawaii, United States
- Died: June 1995 (aged 95) Waimea, Hawaii, United States
- Spouse(s): Henry Oscar Lai Hipp (m. 1919, div. 1939); James Lyman Perry-Fiske (m. 1943, died 1977)
- Parent(s): William Miller Seymour Lindsey; Mary A. Leialoha Rose
- Occupation: Rancher

Anna Leialoha Lindsey Perry-Fiske (née Lindsey; February 2, 1900 – June 1995) was an American rancher, philanthropist, and advocate for Native Hawaiian culture. She is notable for managing the Lindsey Ranch (later renamed Anna Ranch), which was atypical for women at the time, and for introducing Brahman and Charolais cattle to Hawaii.

== Early life and education ==
Lindsey was born on February 2, 1900 in Hilo, Hawaii to William Miller Seymour Lindsey and Mary A. Leialoha Rose. She was part English and part Native Hawaiian. She attended a Catholic school and learned horse riding, lassoing, and other cowboy skills from her father, alongside her brothers. On December 20, 1919, she married Henry Oscar Lai Hipp, and later founded Lai Hipp stables, becoming one of Hawaii's first female jockeys. They divorced in 1939.

== Career ==
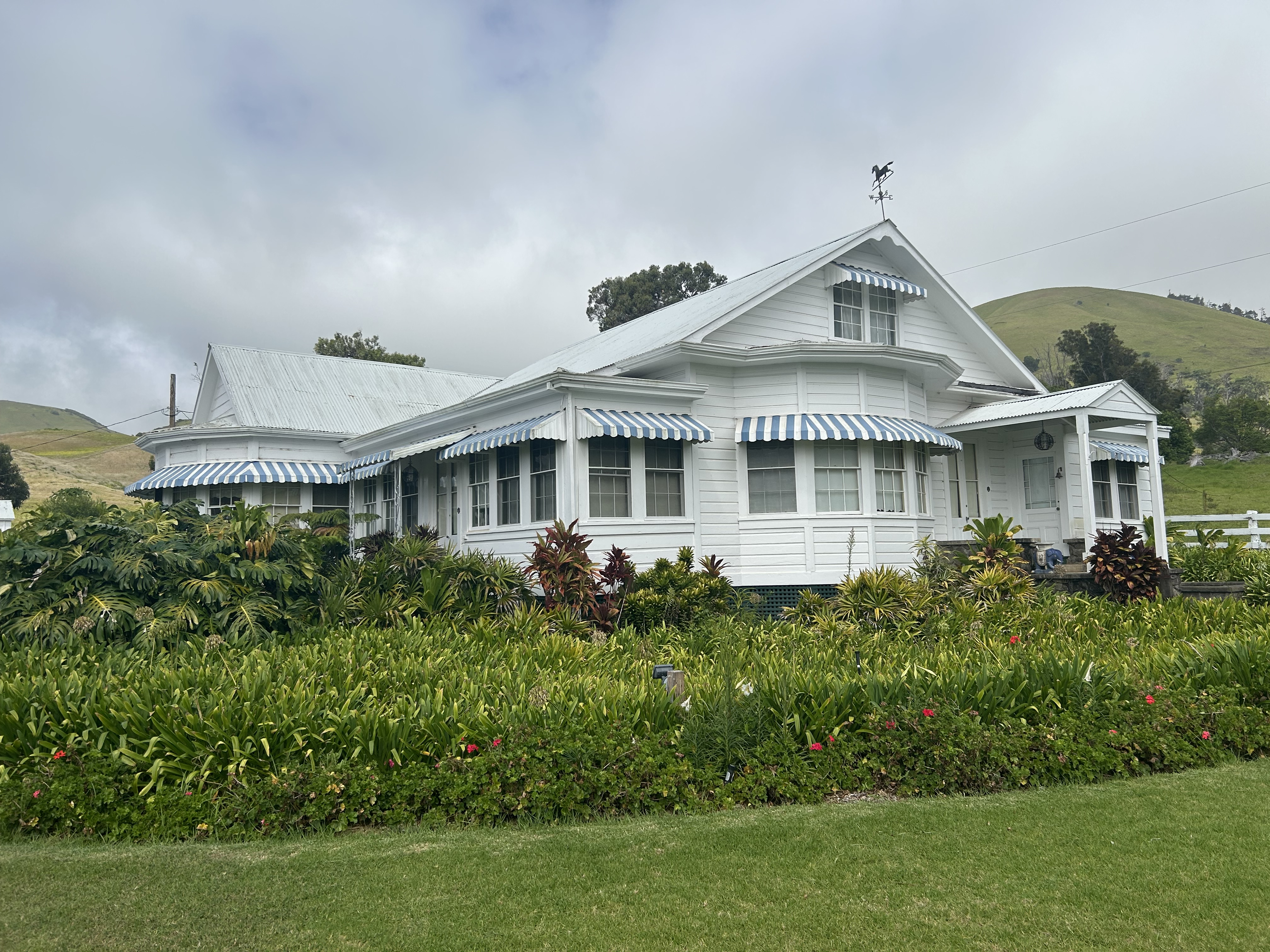
Anna Ranch in Waimea, Hawaii

In 1939, upon her father's death, she took over the family ranch, Lindsey Ranch, in nearby Waimea. The ranch was heavily in debt, so she performed most of the work herself. The ranch was later renamed Anna Ranch, after her. In 1943, Lindsey married James Lyman Perry-Fiske. James helped with the ranch, and the couple introduced Brahman and Charolais cattle to the ranch, becoming the first in Hawaii to do so. She spent two decades as the Hawaii County Parks Commissioner. James died in June 1977.

In 1963, Lindsey founded Old Hawai'i on Horseback, a local parade, pageant, and rodeo. She worked to fundraise for the event, which raised money for the American Heart Association. A philanthropist, Lindsey also produced a successful auction for Hawaii Preparatory Academy, and made multiple large contributions to the Lucy Henriques Medical Center (now Queen's North Hawaii Community Hospital) for the construction of an emergency room.

Lindsey continued to manage the ranch until her death. She was named "Career Woman of the Year" by the Hawai'i Federation of Business and Professional Women in 1968, and was honored by the Hawai'i Livestock Show and Sales Committee for being the "top buyer for two decades."

== Later life ==
Lindsey died in June 1995. She was posthumously inducted to the Hawai'i Paniolo (Cowboy) Hall of Fame in 2009.
