= Hale Halawai O Holualoa =

Historic Place in Hawaii County, Hawaii

- Hale Halawai o Holualoa
- U.S. National Register of Historic Places
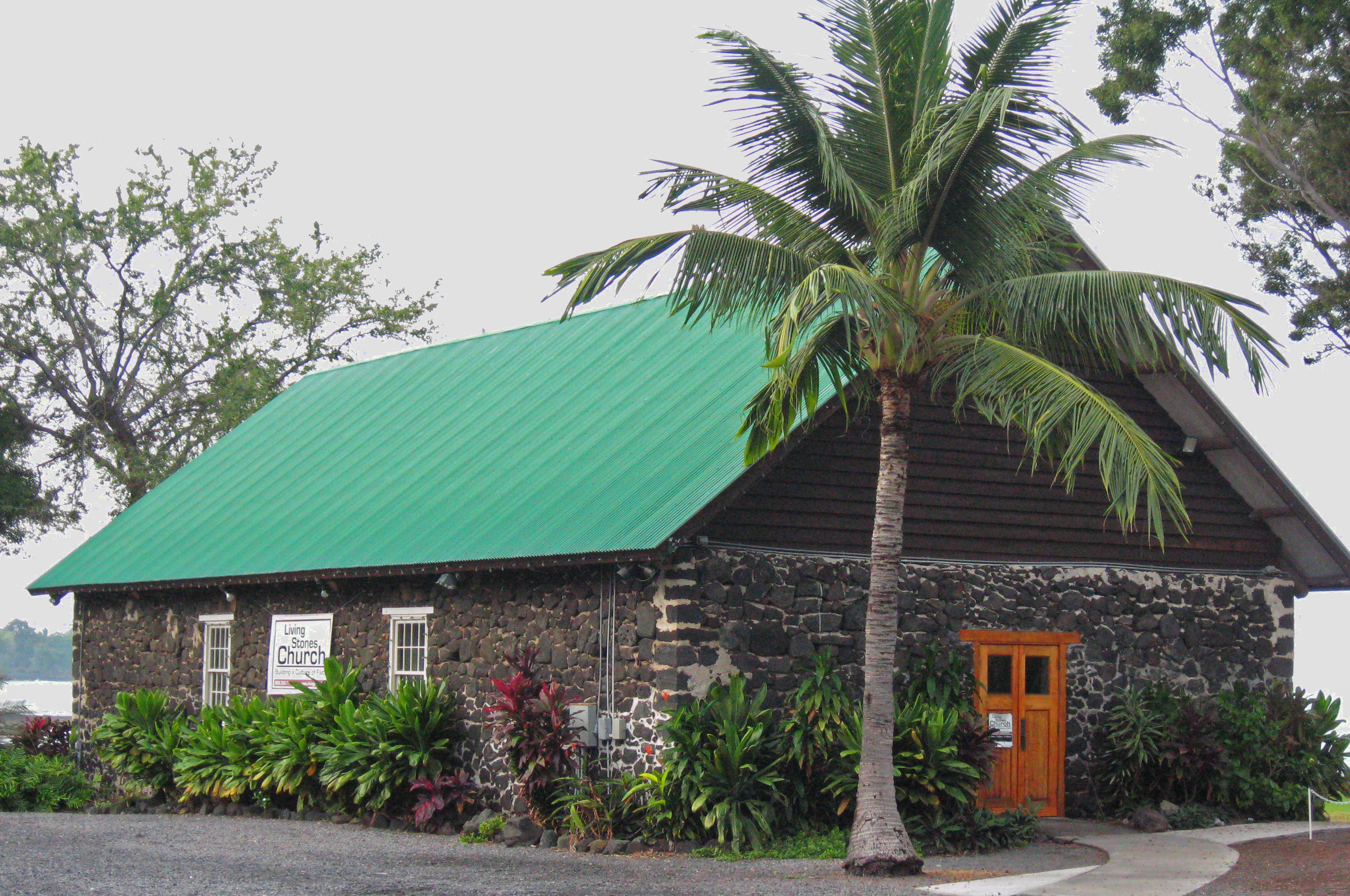

- Location within Hawaii
- Location: Hawaii County, Hawaii
- Nearest city: Kailua-Kona
- Area: less than one acre
- Architect: John D. Paris
- NRHP reference No.: 87000794
- Added to NRHP: June 5, 1987

Hale Hālāwai O Hōlualoa is the former name of Living Stones Church located in the Kona District on the Big Island of Hawaii.

== History ==
The name means "Meeting house near the long slide" in the Hawaiian Language. There might have been a wooden church on the site from about 1825. A coral lime and stone building, of about 30 by 60 feet, was finished by 1855, under the supervision of Reverend John D. Paris. It was in continuous use until the 1940s. There is also a small grave site, some old stone walls, and a canoe landing. Several Kōnane boards have been discovered during excavation, indicating a long occupation of the site.

== Today ==
The site was added to the state register of historic places on November 26, 1986, as site 10-37-7234, and the national register on June 5, 1987, as site 87000794. The Holualoa Bay Congregational Church reconstructed the building in the early 1990s under the direction of Norman Kenneth Smith. The land is leased from the state, and is near the North end of Holualoa Bay. The church grounds are currently used by Living Stones Church with several events each week, often on the lawn right on the edge of the ocean.
