= Hōlualoa Bay =

Historic Place in Hawaii County, Hawaii

- Hōlualoa 4 Archeological District; Kamoa Point Complex
- U.S. National Register of Historic Places
- U.S. Historic district
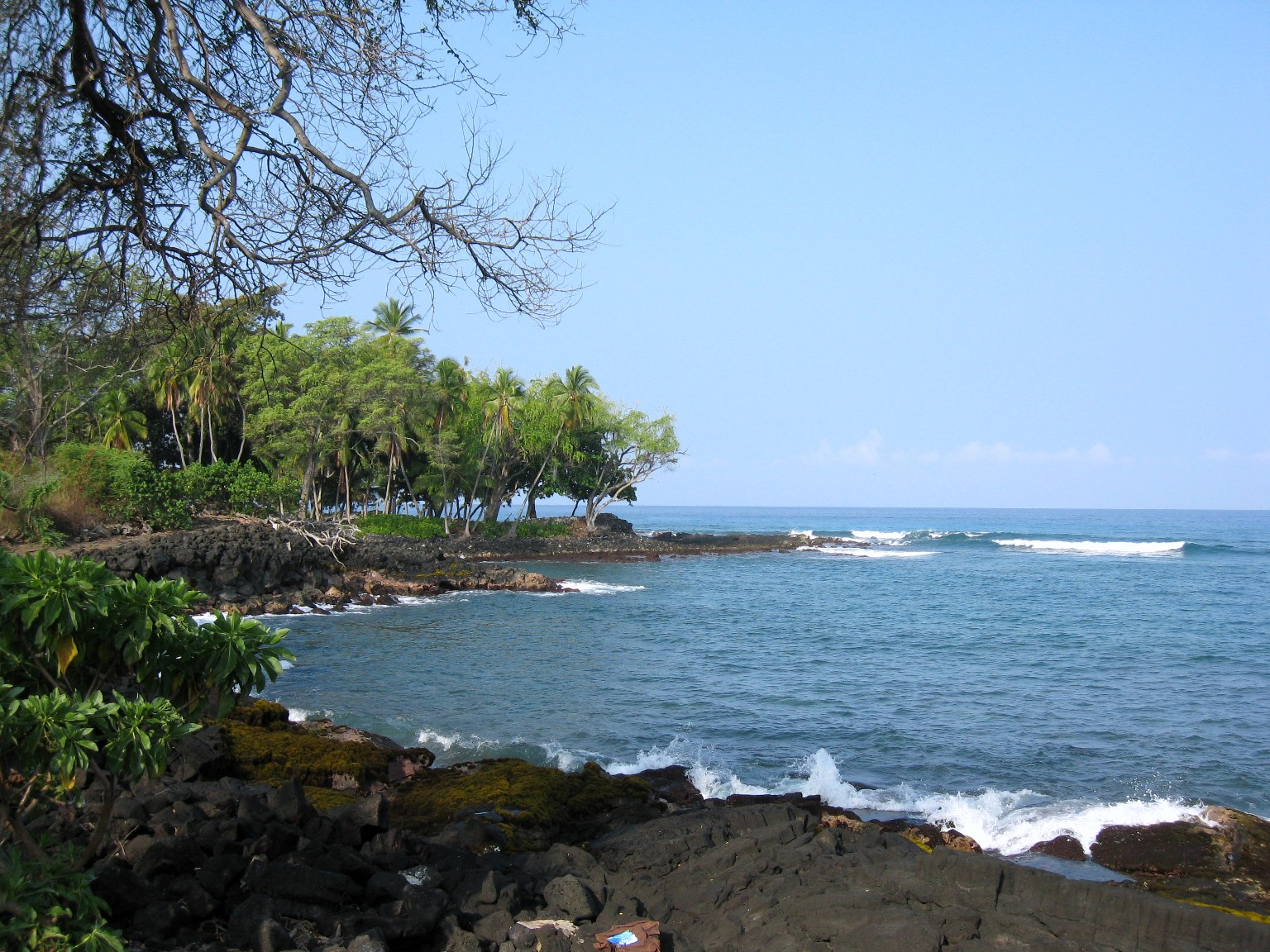
- Kamoa Point on Hōlualoa Bay

- Location within Hawaii
- Location: Aliʻi Drive, Kailua-Kona, Hawaii
- Coordinates: 19°36′7.78″N 155°58′29.4″W
- Area: 28.4 acres (115,000 m^{2})
- Built: 1300 - 1800
- Architectural style: Ancient Hawaii
- NRHP reference No.: 83000247; 05000542
- Added to NRHP: June 8, 2005

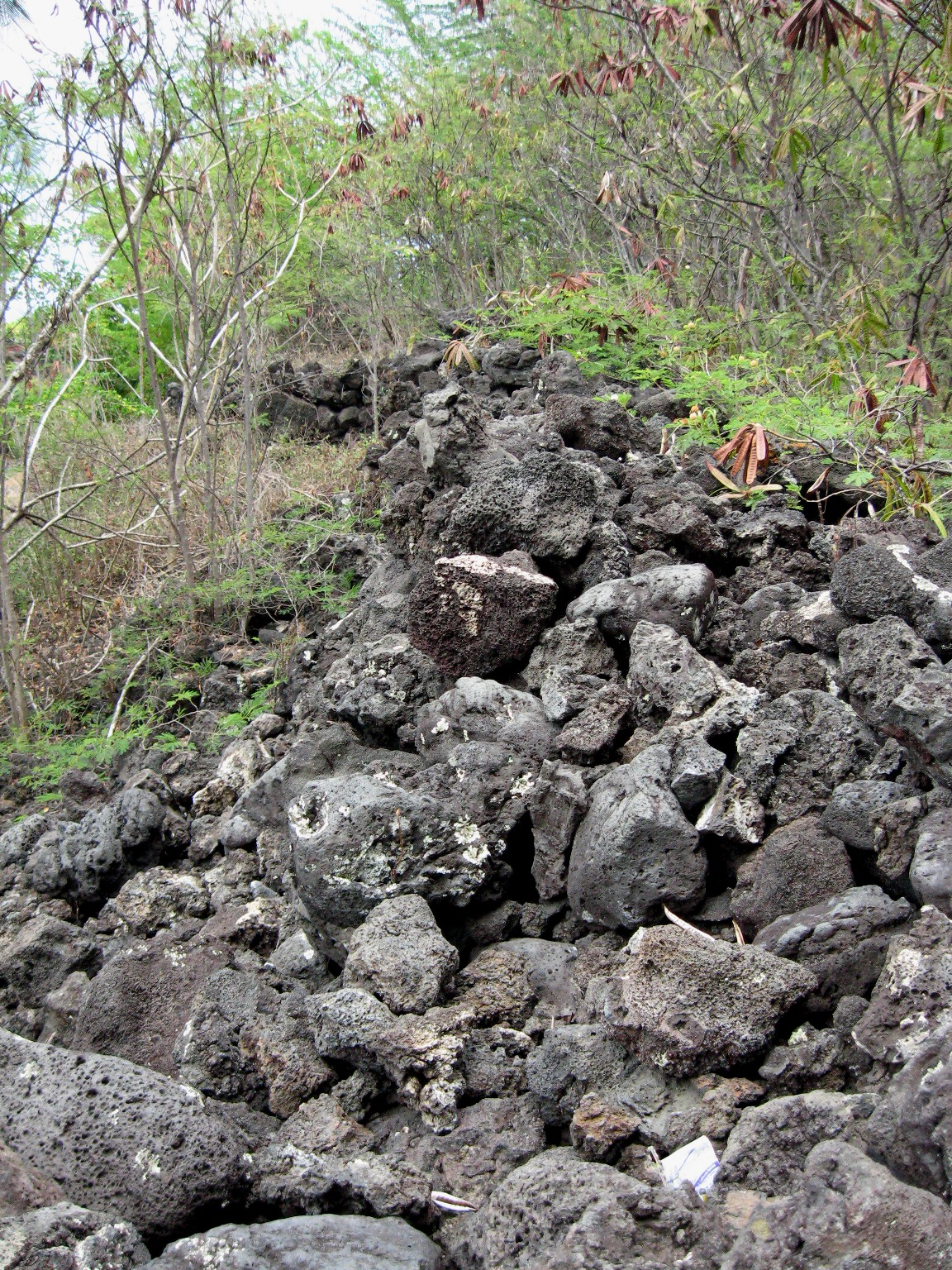
The massive walls are now overgrown, but remain impressive

Hōlualoa Bay is a historic area between Kailua-Kona and Keauhou Bay in the Kona District of the Big Island of Hawaiʻi. The community now called Hōlualoa is uphill (mauka in the Hawaiian Language) from this bay. The name means "long slide" in the Hawaiian Language, from the long trail that went from a forest on the slopes of Hualālai (where the village is now), to a site where the logs were made into canoes (on the grounds of Sadie Seymour Botanical Gardens) into this bay where a large royal building complex was built over several centuries.

== History ==
Keākealaniwahine, one of the first known Aliʻi Aimoku wahine ("Queens") of the entire island of Hawaiʻi, built a large complex of buildings here in the seventeenth century, with the area settled several hundred years before that. The royal complex included residential areas, as well as Heiaus (ancient temples) called Hikapaia (for plentiful food and fish) and Hualani (for teaching about medicinal herbs), and burial areas. Keakamahana, the mother of Keakealaniwahine, was the first named royalty to live here. This area (uphill or mauka of Aliʻi drive) was added to the National Register of Historic Places on June 8, 2005, as the Holualoa 4 Archeological District with site number 05000542. It is State Archeological site number 50-10-37-23.661.

The Kamoa Point Complex, the area West of Aliʻi drive on the south side of the bay, included a temple for surfers, called the Haleʻaʻama Heiau, and a large ancient sports complex named after chiefess Keolonāhihi, thought to have lived circa 1300. Here warriors could practice their skills. Some legends say Keolonāhihi was the daughter of Paʻao, the (perhaps mythical) priest who brought the Hawaiian Religion from a distant land. It was added to over the years, including a terraced grandstand to watch surfing contests.

Kamehameha I, the great-great-grandson of Keakealaniwahine, probably learned to surf here in his youth. When he came to power he lived further north in Kamakahonu but continued to maintain a temple here called Hale O Kaili to the war god Kūkailimoku. Although this Hōlualoa was for the practical purpose of building canoes, sliding down the lava rock evolved into a favorite sport of the upper class called heʻe hōlua. Kamehameha constructed a large ramp purely for the sport a few miles further south known as the Keauhou Holua Slide, some of which is preserved.

The complex on the point was originally added to the National Register of Historic Places on July 14, 1983, as site 83000247. It is state site 10-37-2059, added November 2, 1977.

== Decline ==
After the death of Kamehameha I in 1819, the royalty converted to Christianity and deconstructed many of the old temples. William Ellis toured the area in 1823, and recorded ruins with holes that had "idols removed" but were otherwise well preserved. He described one enclosure as two hundred seventy feet by two hundred ten feet. The place at the time was called Kaluaokalani but this name was unknown on later visits. The number of different names used through the years has added to confusion about the site.

In the Great Mahele of 1848, the area became privately owned. The small beach trail was widened into a larger highway later in the 19th century, bisecting the complex. Some farming and cattle grazing in the early 20th century damaged some features, and a few private homes were built. A developer bought some of the land in 1956 with plans to build a hotel, but only a few small vacation homes were built due to local opposition. In 1973, a survey was done for a project variously known as "Aliʻi Drive realignment", "Kahului-Keauhou Parkway", or "Aliʻi Parkway", which has been on hold for decades. Another proposed road project through the area, Lako Street has been re-routed slightly to avoid some major sites (also on hold as of 2009). In 2010, a four-story condominium complex was proposed, greeted with local opposition.

On the north side of the bay in the 19th century, a small Christian church was built called Hale Halawai O Holualoa. It was restored in the 1990s and now known as the "Living Stones Church".

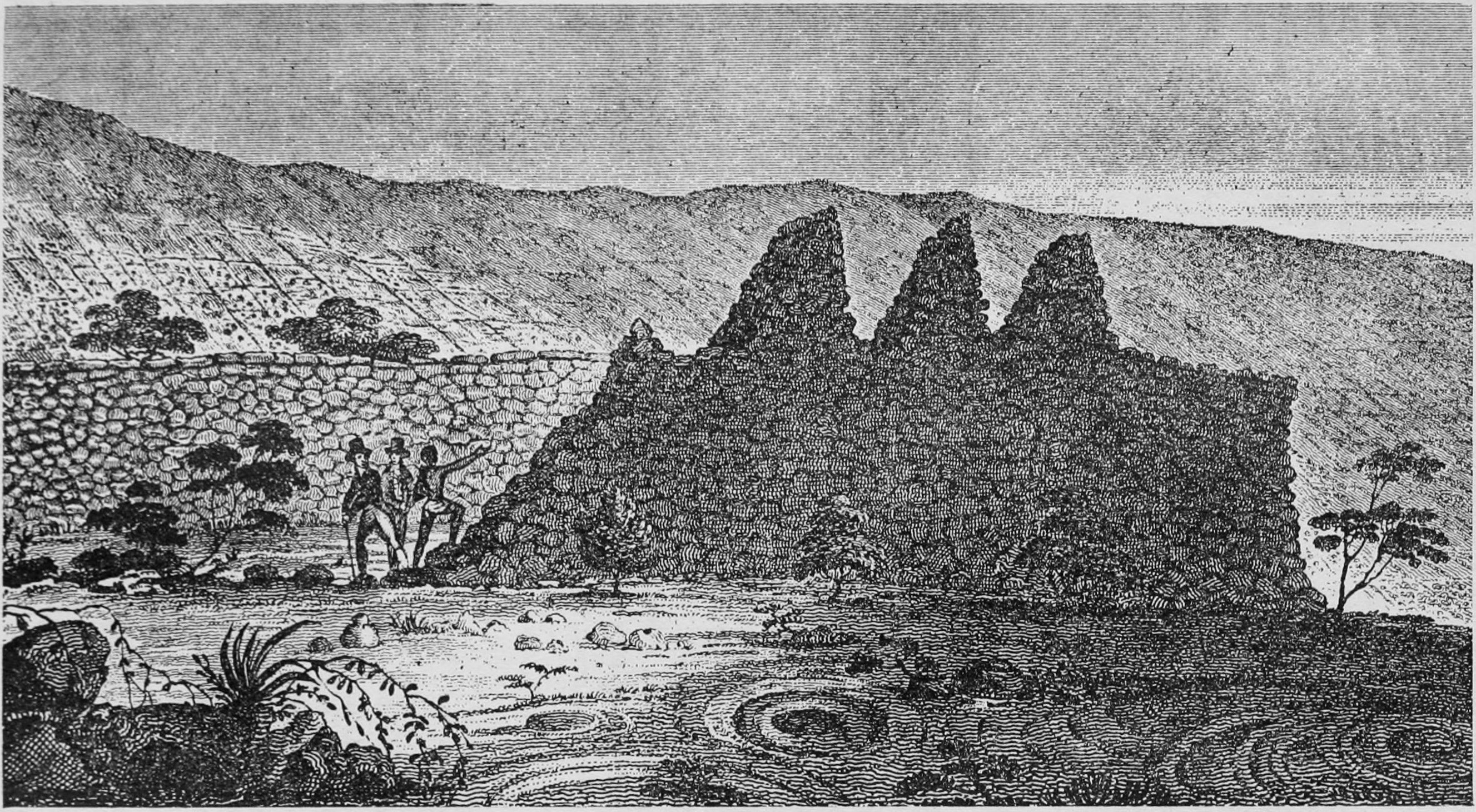
Illustration of ruins from William Ellis Journal describing his tour around the island in 1823

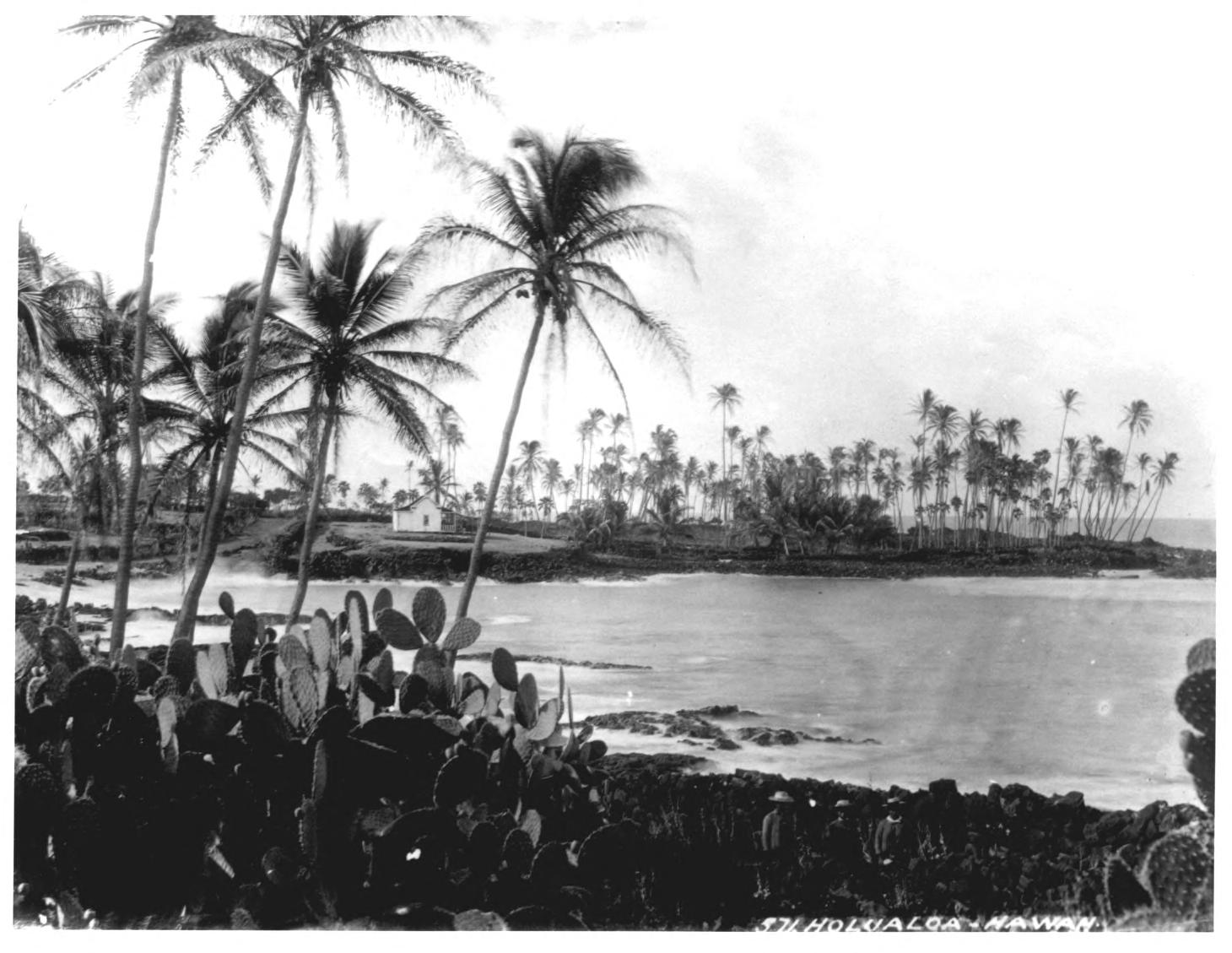
The area in about 1890 was less overgrown, but already had one modern house

== Recreation ==
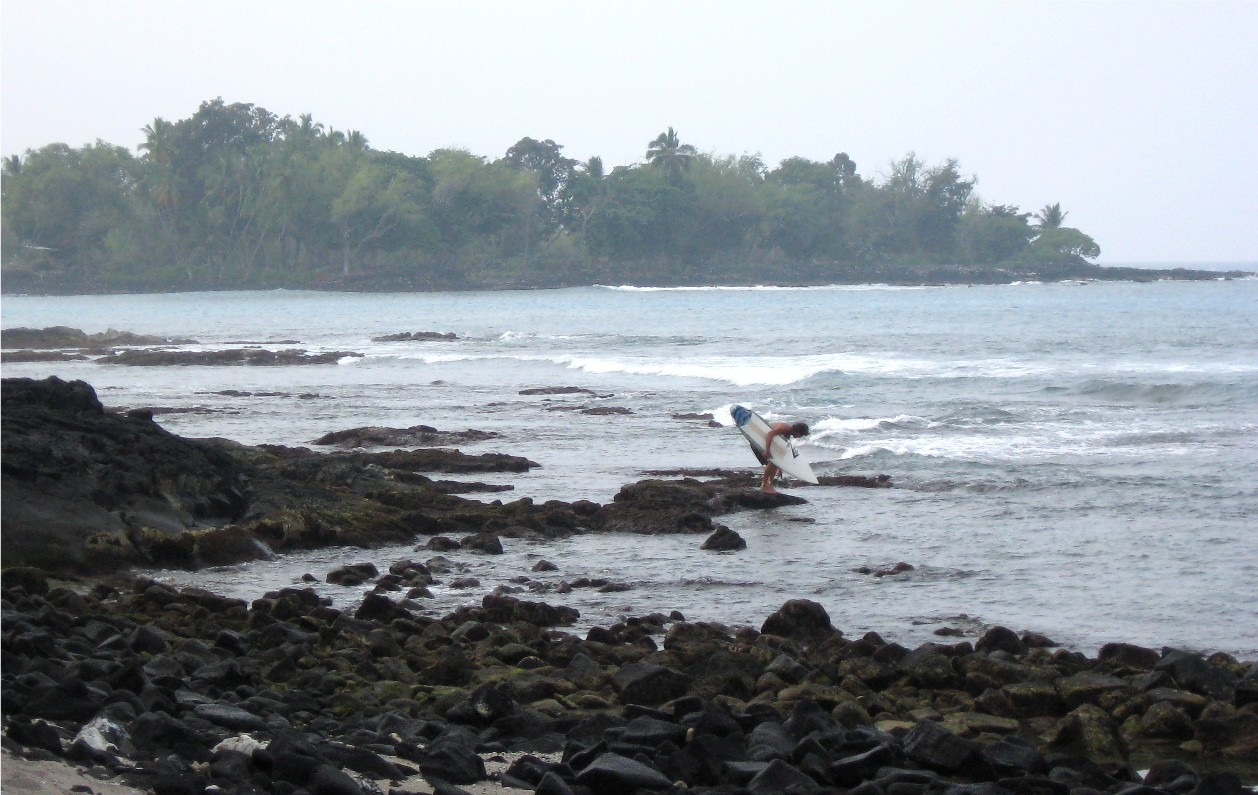
A surfer entering at "Banyans"

The north side of the bay has a lava ridge that produces a popular surf break known as "Banyans", even though no Banyan trees remain. There are small patches of coral sand, but the hazardous waves and currents can be dangerous to all but advanced surfers. Banyans is the site a surf contest, usually in February. The south side of the bay, along Kamoa Point, has a left surf break called "Lyman's", named for former resident Howard Lyman, favored among all surfers. It was the subject of a song "Laimana" composed by Lei Collins in 1956.

The State purchased some land at Kamoa Point in 1990 to develop the area as Keolonāhihi State Historical Park and some clearing work has been done, but as of 2009 it has only a narrow public access trail. An environmental impact statement was filed in 1995, and an additional 16 acres (65,000 m^{2}) in the Hōlualoa 4 area on the East of Aliʻi Drive was donated in 1998. The property had been foreclosed upon by First Hawaiian Bank, when it was realized a Senior Vice President of the Bank was a descendant of Keakealaniwahine. One more parcel of 1.25 acres (5,100 m^{2}) was purchased in 2005.

== See also ==
- Contributing property
- Cultural landscape
- Historic preservation
- Keeper of the Register
- List of heritage registers
- Property type (National Register of Historic Places)
- United States National Register of Historic Places listings
- State Historic Preservation Office
