= Anna Robertson Brown Lindsay =

Anna Robertson Brown Lindsay (1864–1948) was the first woman to earn a doctorate at the University of Pennsylvania; she had previously attended Wellesley College and Oxford University. She wrote a number of books on theological topics, most of which were published in the early-1900s. Anna Robertson Brown Lindsay was the daughter of a Presbyterian minister and the first woman to graduate with a Ph.D in English from the University of Pennsylvania.

Lindsay was married to Samuel McCune Lindsay, and they had three children.
