= Hōnaunau-Nāpōʻopoʻo, Hawaii =

Census-designated place in Hawaii, U.S.

Hōnaunau-Nāpōʻopoʻo
- Census-designated place
- Location in Hawaii County and the state of Hawaii
- Coordinates: 19°27′4″N 155°53′25″W
- Country: United States
- State: Hawaii
- County: Hawaiʻi

Area
  - Total: 41.89 sq mi (108.49 km^{2})
  - Land: 38.00 sq mi (98.43 km^{2})
  - Water: 3.88 sq mi (10.06 km^{2})
- Elevation: 750 ft (230 m)

Population (2020)
  - Total: 2,416
  - Density: 63.6/sq mi (24.54/km^{2})
- Time zone: UTC−10 (Hawaii-Aleutian)
- Area code: 808
- FIPS code: 15-16160
- GNIS feature ID: 2414045

Hōnaunau-Nāpōʻopoʻo is a census-designated place (CDP) in Hawaiʻi County, Hawaii, United States. The population was 2,416 at the 2020 census.

== Geography ==
Boat house at Honaunau Bay

Hōnaunau-Nāpōʻopoʻo is located on the west side of the island of Hawaiʻi at 19°26′45″N 155°53′14″W. It is bordered to the north by the Captain Cook CDP and to the west by the Pacific Ocean. It contains the unincorporated community of Hōnaunau in the southwest corner of the CDP, on Hōnaunau Bay, and Nāpōʻopoʻo in the northwest corner, on Kealakekua Bay.

Hawaii Route 11 is the main road through the CDP, leading north 16 miles (26 km) to Kailua-Kona and south 43 miles (69 km) to Nāʻālehu. Hawaii Route 160 winds downhill from Route 11 to connect the communities of Hōnaunau and Nāpōʻopoʻo.

According to the United States Census Bureau, the Honaunau-Napoopoo CDP has a total area of 41.9 square miles (108.5 km^{2}), of which 38.0 square miles (98.4 km^{2}) are land and 3.9 square miles (10.1 km^{2}), or 9.27%, are water.

Nāpōʻopoʻo has a tropical monsoon climate (Köppen Am) with uniformly warm temperatures year-round.

=== Climate ===
The climate data for Hōnaunau-Nāpōʻopoʻo is retrieved from the Desert Research Institute's Western Regional Climate Center.

Climate data for Nāpōʻopoʻo
Month	Jan	Feb	Mar	Apr	May	Jun	Jul	Aug	Sep	Oct	Nov	Dec	Year
Mean daily maximum °F (°C)	80.2 (26.8)	80.2 (26.8)	80.6 (27.0)	81.2 (27.3)	81.3 (27.4)	81.8 (27.7)	83.1 (28.4)	84.1 (28.9)	83.9 (28.8)	83.4 (28.6)	82.2 (27.9)	80.5 (26.9)	81.9 (27.7)
Mean daily minimum °F (°C)	60.6 (15.9)	60.4 (15.8)	60.5 (15.8)	61.8 (16.6)	62.8 (17.1)	64.0 (17.8)	64.1 (17.8)	65.2 (18.4)	64.8 (18.2)	64.4 (18.0)	63.3 (17.4)	61.3 (16.3)	62.8 (17.1)
Average rainfall inches (mm)	2.52 (64)	1.92 (49)	2.68 (68)	3.19 (81)	3.54 (90)	3.23 (82)	3.76 (96)	3.84 (98)	4.07 (103)	3.25 (83)	2.49 (63)	2.08 (53)	36.57 (930)
Source: WRCC

== Demographics ==
Historical population
Census	Pop.	Note	%±
2020	2,416		—
U.S. Decennial Census

=== 2000 census ===
As of the census of 2000, there were 2,414 people, 846 households, and 591 families residing in the CDP. The population density was 63.5 inhabitants per square mile (24.5/km^{2}). There were 944 housing units at an average density of 24.8 per square mile (9.6/km^{2}). The racial makeup of the CDP was 35.29% White, 0.29% African American, 0.87% Native American, 17.48% Asian, 14.21% Pacific Islander, 2.07% from other races, and 29.78% from two or more races. Hispanic or Latino of any race were 6.13% of the population. There were 846 households, out of which 30.1% had children under the age of 18 living with them, 50.4% were married couples living together, 11.9% had a female householder with no husband present, and 30.1% were non-families. 20.3% of all households were made up of individuals, and 5.2% had someone living alone who was 65 years of age or older. The average household size was 2.85 and the average family size was 3.35.

In the CDP the population was spread out, with 25.1% under the age of 18, 8.2% from 18 to 24, 23.7% from 25 to 44, 31.0% from 45 to 64, and 11.9% who were 65 years of age or older. The median age was 40 years. For every 100 females, there were 104.6 males. For every 100 females age 18 and over, there were 104.5 males. The median income for a household in the CDP was $41,912, and the median income for a family was $47,679. Males had a median income of $31,201 versus $24,453 for females. The per capita income for the CDP was $20,025. About 11.6% of families and 13.5% of the population were below the poverty line, including 12.8% of those under age 18 and 5.8% of those age 65 or over.

== Education ==
Hawaiʻi Department of Education operates public schools. Hōnaunau Elementary School is in the CDP. 41.0% of the population has a Bachelor's Degree or higher.
