= Kahaluʻu Fish Pond =

- Kahaluʻu Fishpond
- U.S. National Register of Historic Places
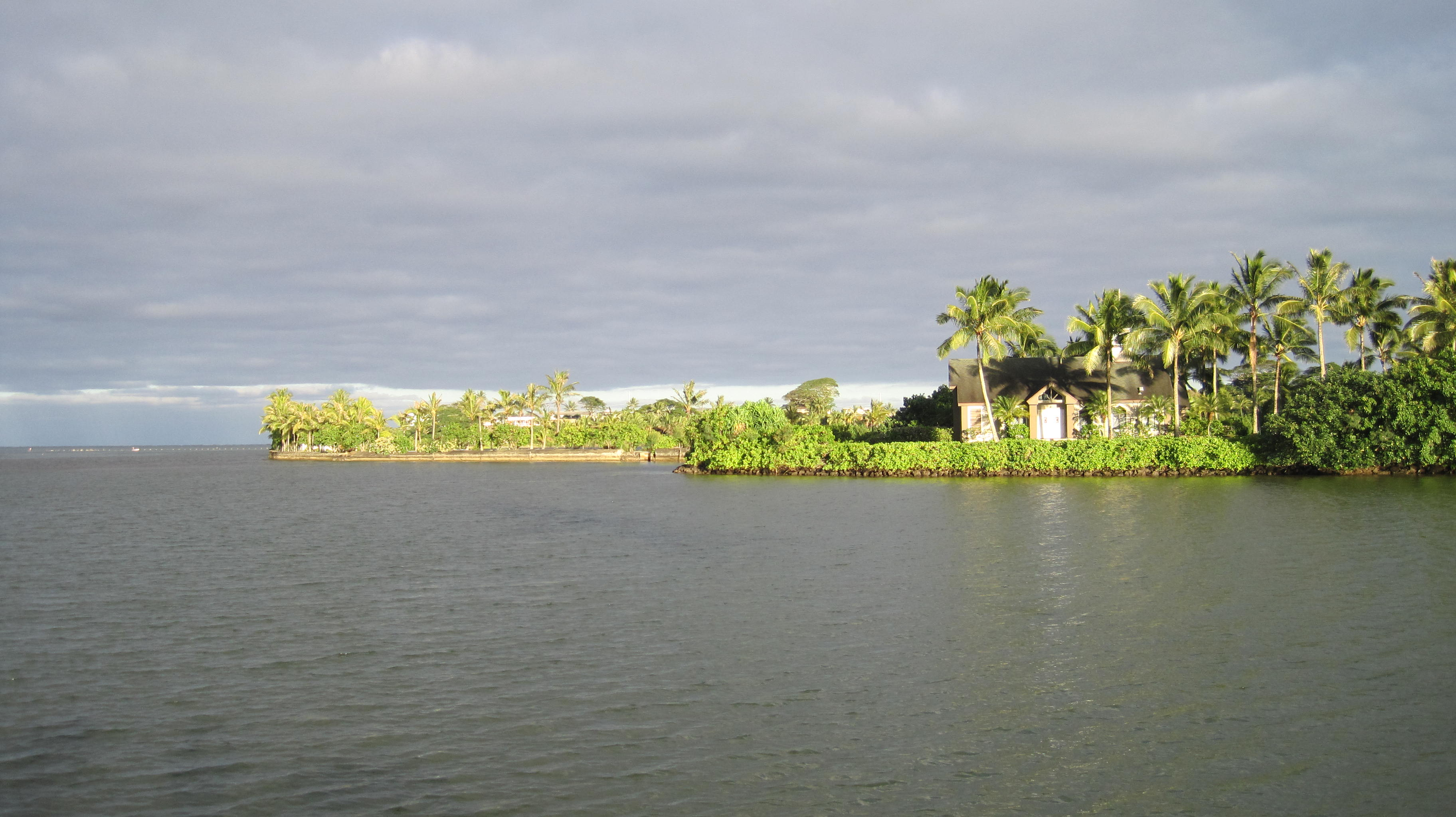
- Seawall and wedding chapel of Kahaluʻu Fishpond

- Location within Hawaii
- Nearest city: NW of Laenani St. off Kamehameha Hwy., Kāneʻohe, Hawaiʻi
- Coordinates: 21°27′45″N 157°50′18″W
- Area: 172 acres (70 ha)
- NRHP reference No.: 73000668
- Added to NRHP: March 14, 1973

Kahaluʻu Fishpond, historically known as Kahouna Fishpond, on Kāneʻohe Bay in windward Oʻahu, is one of only four surviving ancient Hawaiian fishponds on Oʻahu that were still in use well into the 20th century. In the previous century there were at least 100 such fishponds around the island. Kahouna was in use until about 1960 and was added to the National Register of Historic Places in 1973, after members of the surrounding community raised concerns that it would be destroyed by development. The Kahaluu Taro Lo'i Historic District was also added to the National Register at that time.

Kahouna features a semicircular seawall about 1,200 feet (370 m) long. The inner and outer faces of the original wall were of stacked stone, with gravel, coral rubble, and soil as fillers between them.

Like its larger counterparts at Moliʻi and Heʻeia, Kahouna Fishpond is now private property. Of the four major fishponds on Oʻahu, only Huilua Fishpond is open to the public. Kahaluu Pond, Inc., now leases its property for Hawaiian weddings. There is a wedding chapel at one end and a pavilion and garden area at the other, each leased to different vendors. Columbia Pictures also filmed part of The Karate Kid Part II, at the site.

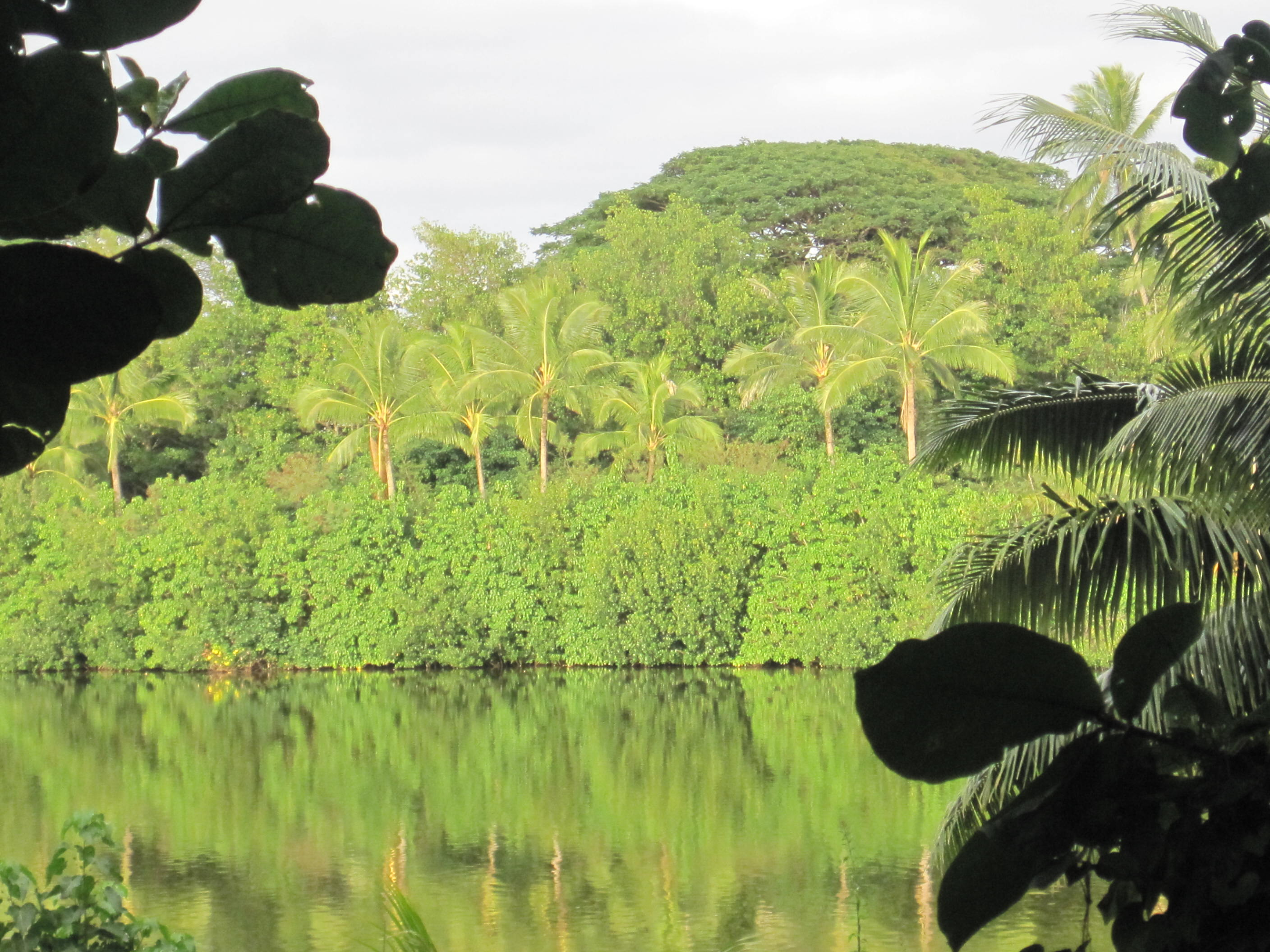
Mangroves along seawall leeward of Laenani Point
