= Moliʻi Fishpond =

- U.S. National Register of Historic Places
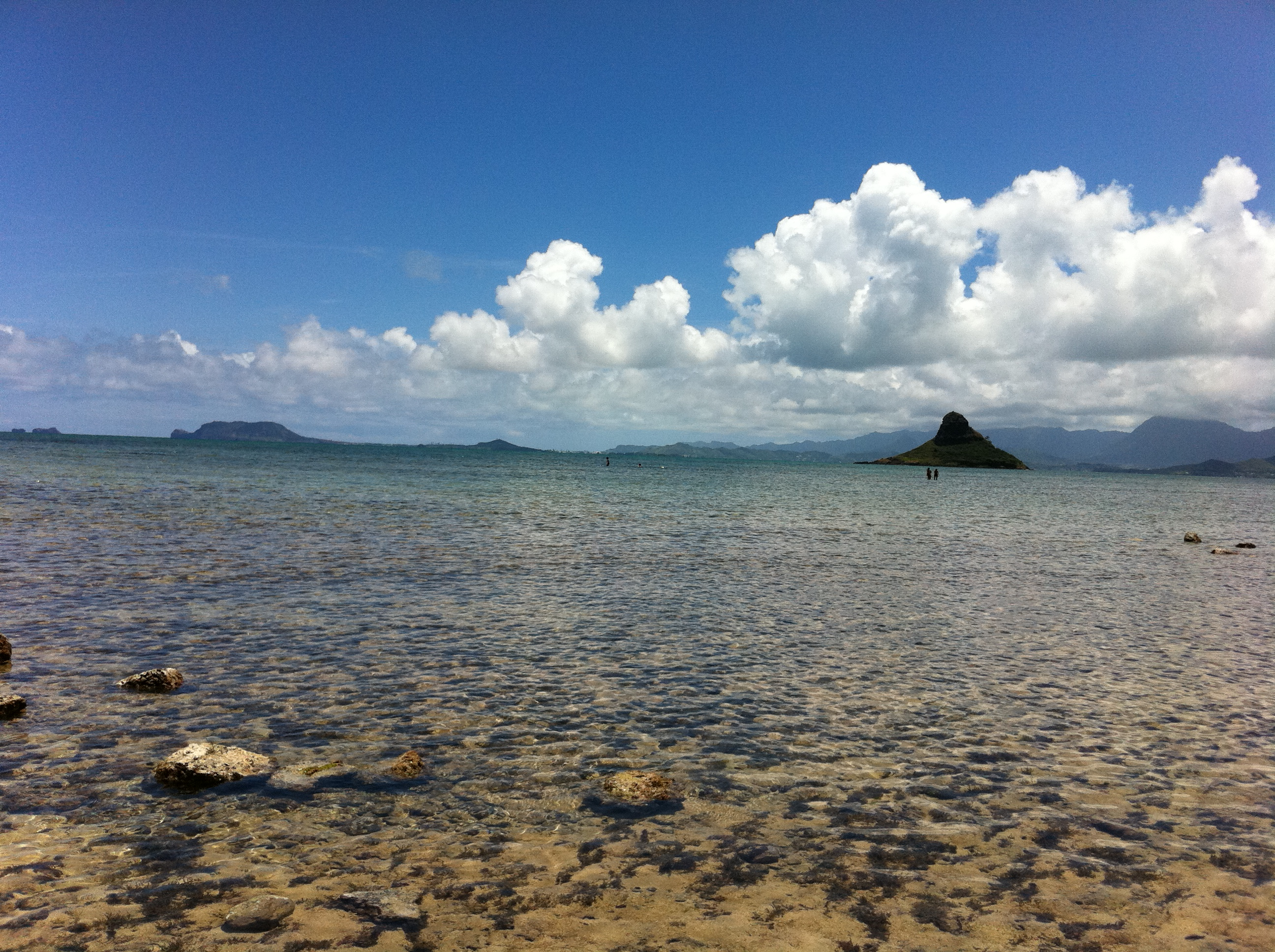

- Location within Hawaii
- Nearest city: Kāneʻohe, Hawaiʻi
- Coordinates: 21°30′47″N 157°50′57″W
- Area: 125 acres (50.59 ha; 0.20 sq mi)
- NRHP reference No.: 72000429
- Added to NRHP: December 5, 1972

Moliʻi Fishpond is located southeast of Kamehameha Highway between Kualoa and Johnson Roads, near Kaneohe, on the island of Oahu, in the U.S. state of Hawaii. The pond encompasses 125 acres (50.59 ha; 0.20 sq mi) The locale is part of the ahupuaa (land division) of Hakipuu. The Molii pond is part of Kualoa Ranch. Tilapia, mullet and moi are found within the pond. Commercial fishing operations are contracted out.

Ancient Hawaiian fishponds were noted in the 1826 journal of William Ellis, the naturalist on James Cook's third voyage (1776–1779):

They [the Hawaiians] have numerous small lakes and ponds, frequently artificial, wherein they breed fish of various kinds, and in tolerable abundance.

— William Ellis, Tour through Owhyee

Moli'i, along with Huilua, Kahaluu and Heʻeia are the only four original Hawaiian fishponds remaining on Oahu. Fishponds were used by the ancient Hawaiians for ocean husbandry. Each pond had a set of sluices that controlled the seawater flow and the fish available in the pond for harvesting. Moli'i had five such sluices, and three of the sluices were still in place in 1972 when the pond was listed on the National Register of Historic Places listings in Oahu. This system of harvesting ocean catch was unique to Hawaii, and does not exist within other areas of ancient Polynesia. The 4,000-foot (1,200 m) wall which partitions the pond from Kaneohe Bay dates back to the earliest Hawaiian settlement of the land, and is traditionally attributed to the Menehune of Hawaiian mythology. The craftsmanship applied in constructing the wall is similar to brickwork, in that the gaps and crevices between the stacked stones are plugged with coral and smaller rocks.

== Gallery ==
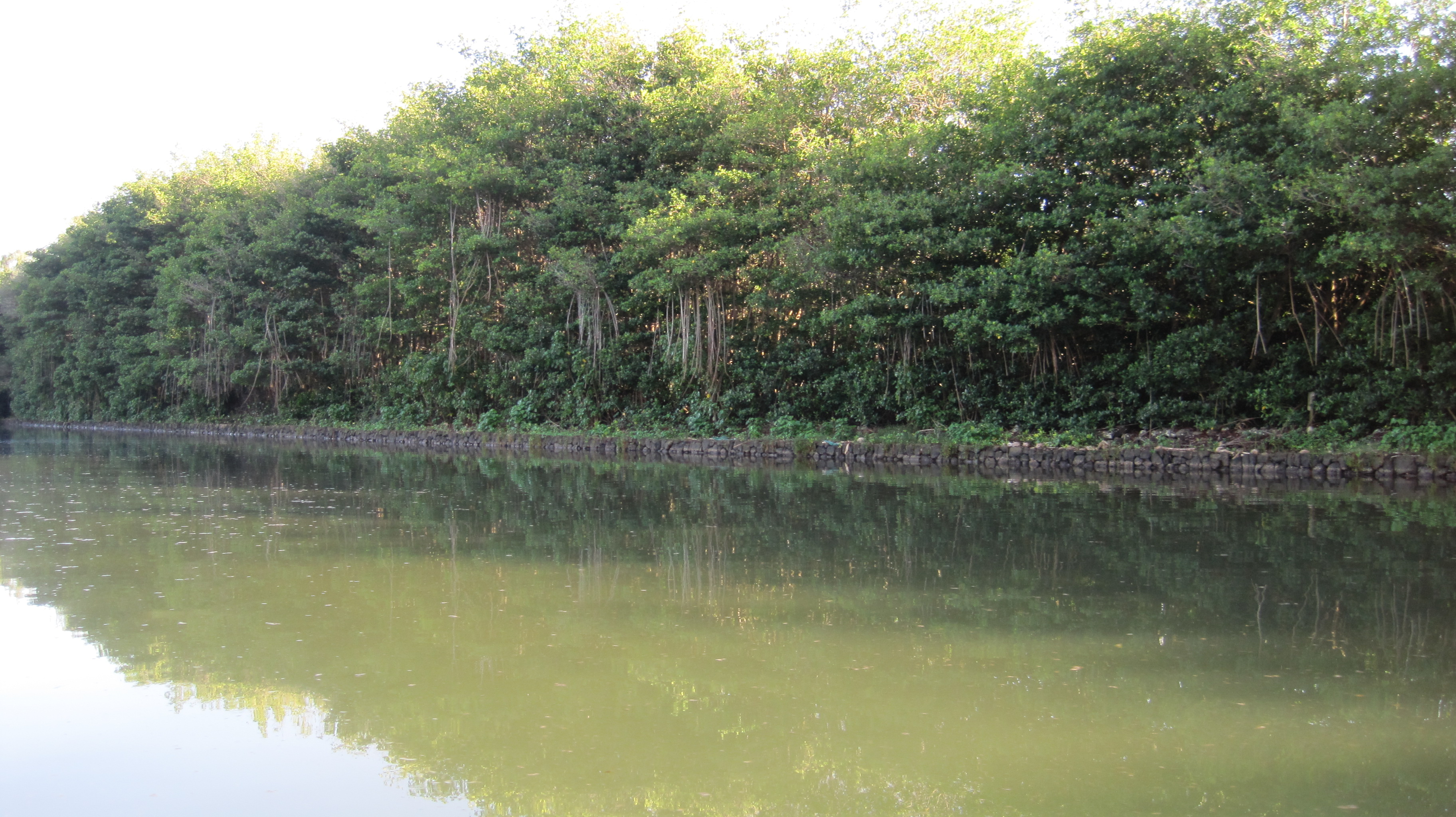
Rock wall at Moli'i Fishpond

Hakipuu on Ahupuaa map

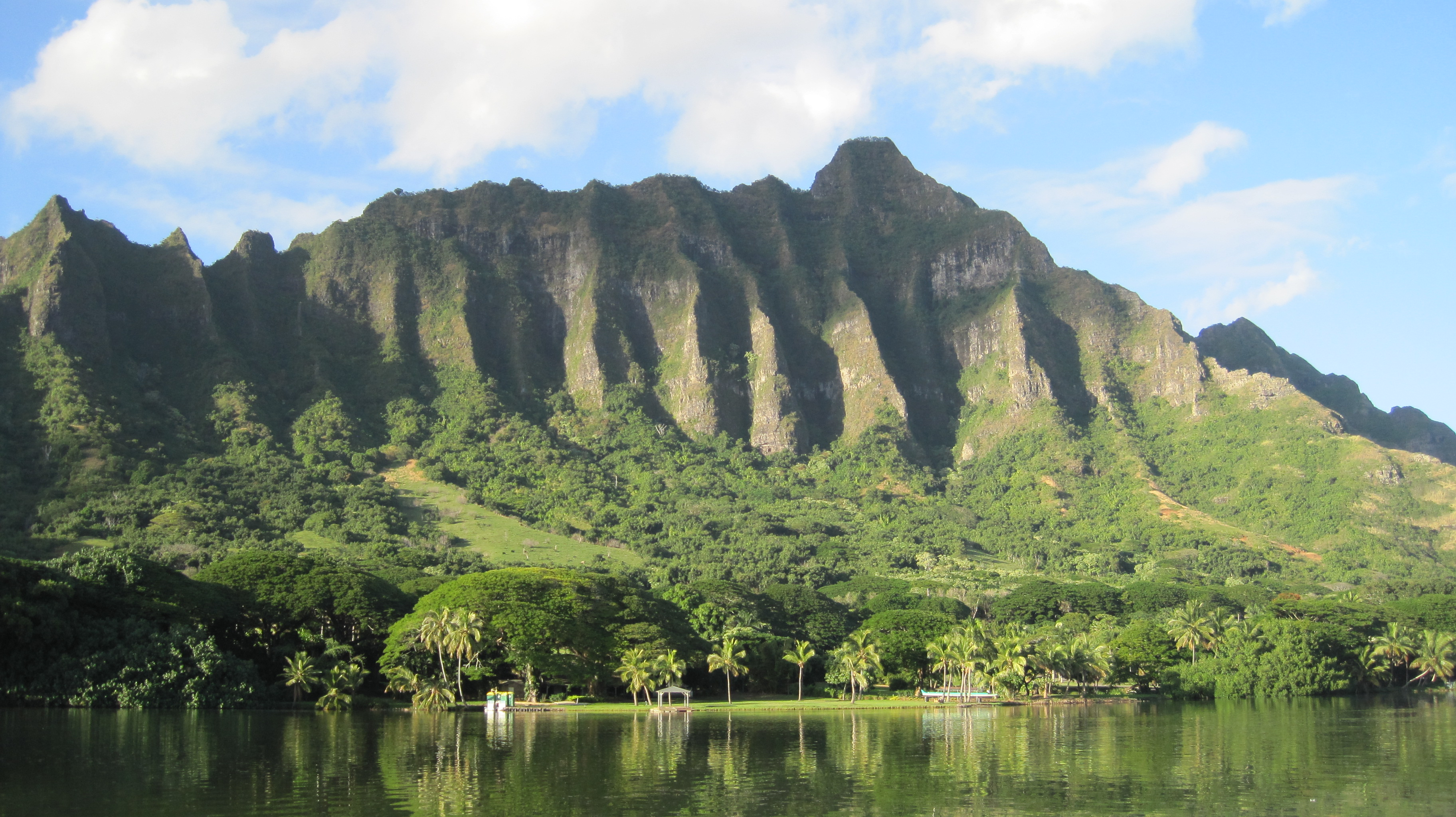
Facing Kualoa Ridge

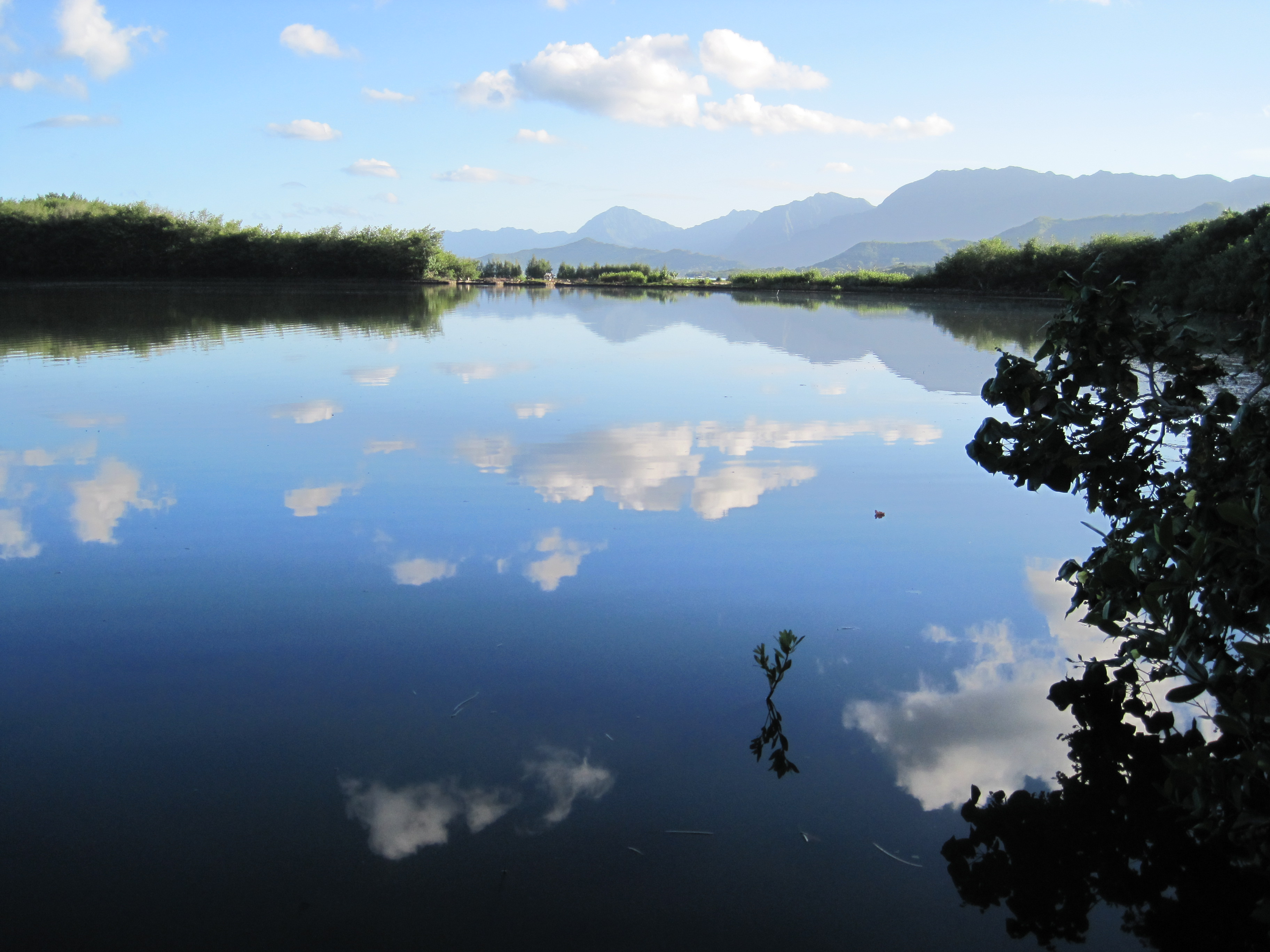
Facing Kaneohe

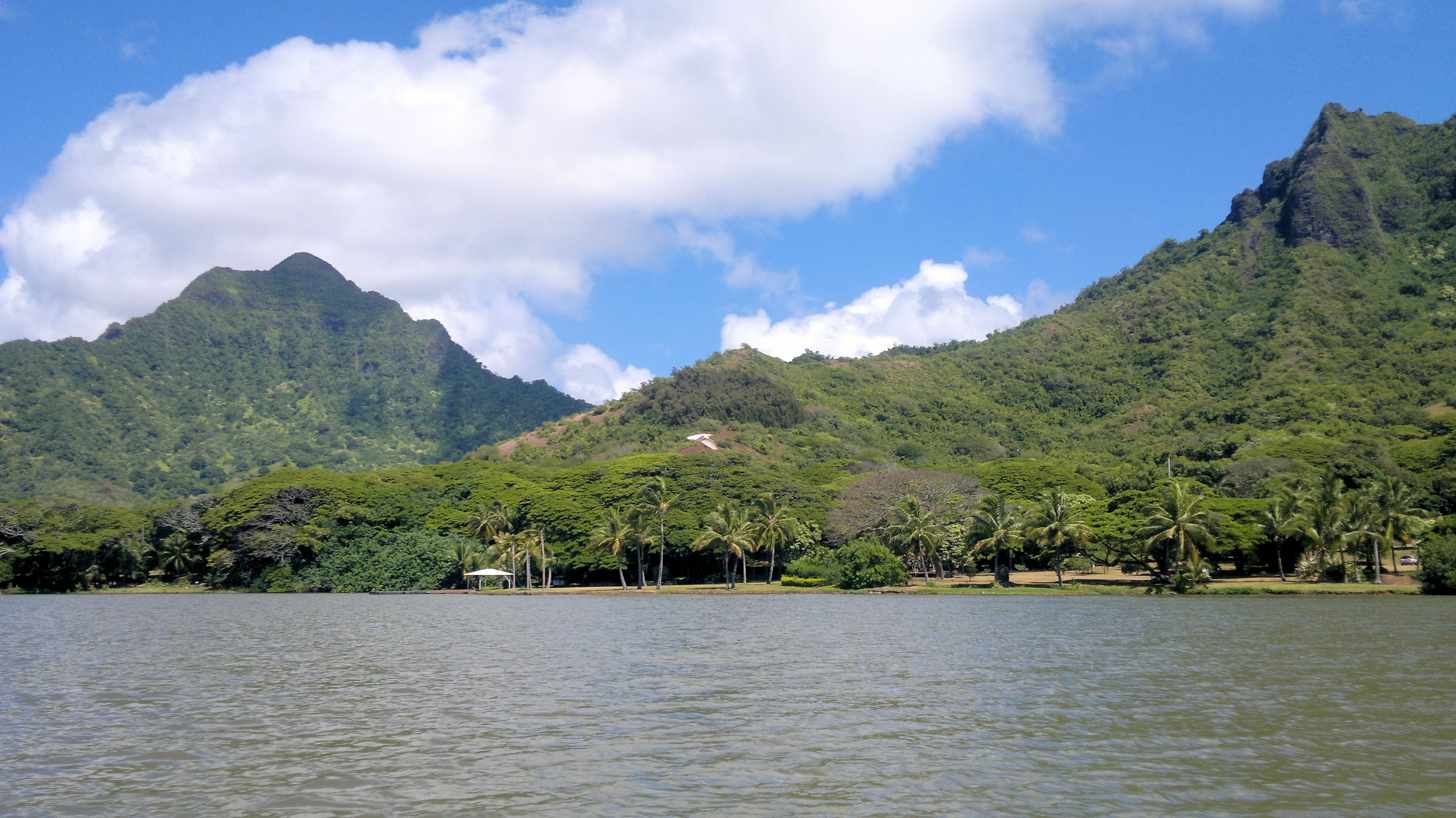
Facing the Kualoa Mountains

== See also ==
- Ancient Hawaiian aquaculture

Today's Staradvertiser (7 June 2017) has an article on oysters in Pearl Harbor that says Moli`i fishpond's most valuable money crop now is oysters.
