= Heʻeia National Estuarine Research Reserve =

American conservation area

The He‘eia National Estuarine Research Reserve is one of 30 reserves established as part of the National Estuarine Research Reserve System. It was designated in 2017 to protect 1,385 acres of the Kāne‘ohe Bay.

== History ==
The Heʻeia National Estuarine Research Reserve is located on the windward shore of Oʻahu in Kāneʻohe Bay. It is the first NERR in the insular biogeographic region of the United States.

Heʻeia NERR was designated in 2017 after a process that began in 2012 with a letter of interest from then-Governor Neil Abercrombie.

Prior to Heʻeia NERR, the state of Hawai’i had another NERR in Waimanu Valley on the island of Hawaiʻi. This site was designated in 1978, but was de-designated in 1993 at the request of the governor because of issues such as inaccessibility and lack of a management plan. Interest in a Hawai’i NERR continued, and in 2012, Governor Abercrombie nominated Heʻeia as a possible site.

Heʻeia was chosen for a variety of reasons, including its accessibility, the support of the Native Hawaiian community, and the presence of the University of Hawaiʻi’s Hawaiʻi Institute of Marine Biology at nearby Moku O Loʻe.

The reserve is now co-managed by HIMB, along with several other organizations. The community was heavily involved in the process of designating the Heʻeia NERR. The community wanted a plan that would effectively and appropriately manage the Heʻeia estuary using both Indigenous and conventional knowledge.

== Administration ==
The lead federal agency is the National Oceanic and Atmospheric Administration, which provides funding, guidance, and technical assistance for the Heʻeia NERR, and conducts periodic performance evaluations of the program. The lead state agency is the Hawai‘i Institute of Marine Biology, which manages the daily operations at the site.

Many other agencies are involved with the reserve, including the following:

- The Koʻolaupoko Hawaiian Civic Club serves as a cultural advisor and advocate for the Heʻeia NERR.
- Kākoʻo ‘Ōiwi works to restore the loʻi kalo and collaborates on research and stewardship programs.
- Paepae o He‘eia works to restore the He‘eia Fishpond and helps conduct research and stewardship programs.
- The Hawai‘i Community Development Authority provides oversight.
- The Reserve Advisory Board, which has representatives from different agencies, advises HIMB and He‘eia NERR staff on the management and implementation of programs.

Numerous organizations helped develop the management plan, including the Koʻolau Foundation, Kākoʻo ‘Ōiwi, Paepae o He‘eia, Hawai‘i Community Development Authority, and Hawaii Department of Land and Natural Resources.

== See also ==
Official Website
