= ʻĀhuimanu, Hawaii =

Census-designated place in Hawaii, United States

ʻĀhuimanu
- Census-designated place
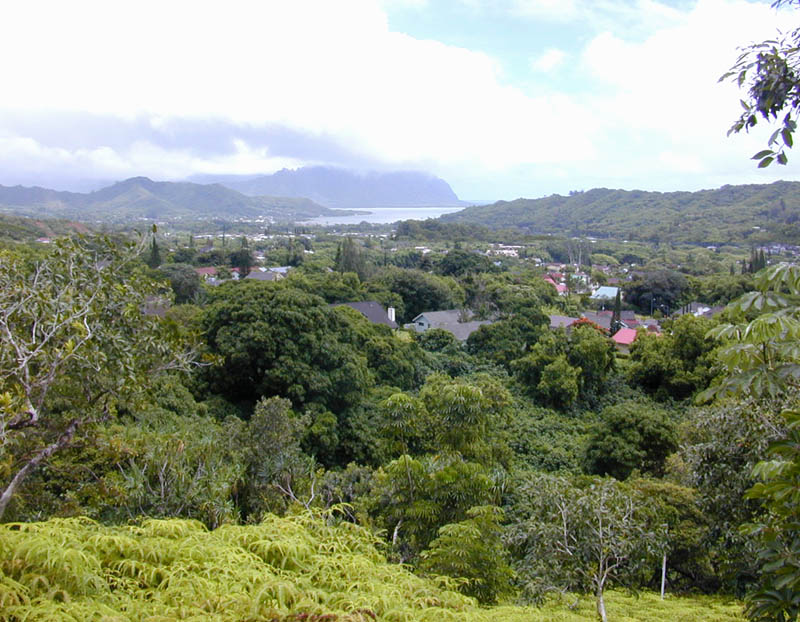
- ʻĀhuimanu looking towards Kāneʻohe Bay

- Location in Honolulu County and the state of Hawaii
- Coordinates: 21°26′36″N 157°50′24″W
- Country: United States
- State: Hawaii
- County: Honolulu

Area
  - Total: 2.69 sq mi (6.98 km^{2})
  - Land: 2.69 sq mi (6.98 km^{2})
  - Water: 0 sq mi (0.00 km^{2})
- Elevation: 82 ft (25 m)

Population (2020)
  - Total: 8,969
  - Density: 3,329/sq mi (1,285.2/km^{2})
- Time zone: UTC-10 (Hawaii-Aleutian)
- ZIP code: 96744
- Area code: 808
- FIPS code: 15-00400
- GNIS feature ID: 0358445

ʻĀhuimanu (Hawaiian pronunciation: [ʔaːhuwiˈmɐnu]) is a census-designated place (CDP) in the City & County of Honolulu, Hawaii, United States, on the island of Oahu. In Hawaiian ʻāhui-manu means "cluster of birds".

ʻĀhuimanu is spread out beneath the steep windward pali (cliff face) of the Koʻolau Range and separated by a low ridge from Heʻeia Kea. Thus, this area is mostly inland and not directly on Kāneʻohe Bay. However, one neighborhood spreads over the ridge and along Kamehameha Highway where there is private access to the bay shore. Proximity to the pali gives the place a generally wet climate. As of the 2010 Census, this largely residential area had a population of 8,810. The Valley of the Temples Memorial Park is a large cemetery noted for its Byodo-In Temple.

The U.S. postal code for ʻĀhuimanu is 96744.

== Geography ==
ʻĀhuimanu is located at on the east side of Oahu 21°26′36″N 157°50′24″W (21.443273, -157.840111). Nearby communities include Heʻeia and Kāneʻohe to the south along State Route 83 (the Kahekili Highway), and Kahaluu, with which it merges to the north.

According to the United States Census Bureau, the CDP has a total area of 2.7 square miles (7.0 km^{2}), all land.

== Demographics ==
Historical population
Census	Pop.	Note	%±
2020	8,969		—
U.S. Decennial Census

In 2010 there were 8,810 people (3,270.2 per square mile), 2,745 households, and 2,246 families residing in the CDP according to the 2010 United States Census. There were 2,826 housing units with 97.1% of them occupied. The racial makeup of the CDP was 22.0% White, 0.7% Black or African American, 0.1% American Indian and Alaska Native, 31.1% Asian, 9.6% Native Hawaiian and Other Pacific Islander, 0.4% from other races, and 36.2% from two or more races. Hispanic or Latino of any race were 9.4% of the population.

There were 2,745 households, out of which 40.4% had children under the age of 18 living in them, 63.8% were Husband-wife families living together, 12.8% had a female householder with no husband present, and 18.2% were non-families. 12.8% of all households were made up of single individuals and 3.5% had someone living alone who was 65 years of age or older. The average household size was 3.19 and the average family size was 3.44.

In the CDP, the median age was 39.2 years. 78.6% were 16 years and over, 76.1% were 18 years and over, 72.6% were 21 years and over, 15.8% were 62 years and over, and 11.7% were 65 years and over.

The median income for a household in the CDP in 2013-2017 was $103,825. The per capita income during the same time period for the CDP was $39,940. About 5.2% of the population was below the poverty line.

== Climate ==
ʻĀhuimanu has a tropical rainforest climate (Köppen: Af).

Climate data for Ahuimanu
Month	Jan	Feb	Mar	Apr	May	Jun	Jul	Aug	Sep	Oct	Nov	Dec	Year
Mean daily maximum °C (°F)	21.8 (71.2)	23.1 (73.6)	26.7 (80.1)	26.1 (79.0)	29.4 (84.9)	31.1 (88.0)	31.1 (88.0)	30.6 (87.1)	29.4 (84.9)	25.6 (78.1)	26.4 (79.5)	23.0 (73.4)	27.0 (80.6)
Daily mean °C (°F)	19.3 (66.7)	20.5 (68.9)	23.4 (74.1)	23.6 (74.5)	22.8 (73.0)	27.6 (81.7)	27.6 (81.7)	27.0 (80.6)	25.8 (78.4)	23.1 (73.6)	22.5 (72.5)	20.4 (68.7)	23.6 (74.5)
Mean daily minimum °C (°F)	16.9 (62.4)	17.9 (64.2)	20.0 (68.0)	21.1 (70.0)	22.8 (73.0)	23.3 (73.9)	23.3 (73.9)	23.3 (73.9)	22.2 (72.0)	20.6 (69.1)	18.6 (65.5)	17.8 (64.0)	20.7 (69.2)
Average precipitation mm (inches)	37.4 (1.47)	41.0 (1.61)	75.0 (2.95)	67.9 (2.67)	29.8 (1.17)	29.3 (1.15)	29.3 (1.15)	30.6 (1.20)	27.7 (1.09)	36.4 (1.43)	51.4 (2.02)	48.9 (1.93)	504.7 (19.84)
Source: Weather.Directory

== Education ==
Ahuimanu Elementary School

Location
- 47-470 Hui Aeko Place; Kāneʻohe, Hawaii 96744; United States

Information
- Type: Public elementary school
- Established: 1973
- School district: Windward Oahu
- Principal: Kimi Ikeda
- Faculty: 50
- Grades: K-6
- Enrollment: 200
- Color: Yellow/Purple
- Nickname: Kolea
- Newspaper: Kani Kolea newsletter
- Website: School site

Ahuimanu Elementary School, located adjacent to but not inside the CDP, is a public, coeducational grade school of the Hawai'i State Department of Education that serves around 200 students in grades K-6. It is located in the community of Temple Valley, Ahuimanu in the ahupua'a of Kāneʻohe near the Ko'olau mountains on the island of Oahu.

Saint Louis School was originally located in the ʻĀhuimanu area of windward Oʻahu as the College of ʻĀhuimanu, founded in 1846 by the Fathers of the Congregation of the Sacred Hearts of Jesus and Mary. In 1881, the school was relocated to Honolulu.
