= Kalepolepo Fishpond =

- U.S. National Register of Historic Places
- Hawaiʻi Register of Historic Places
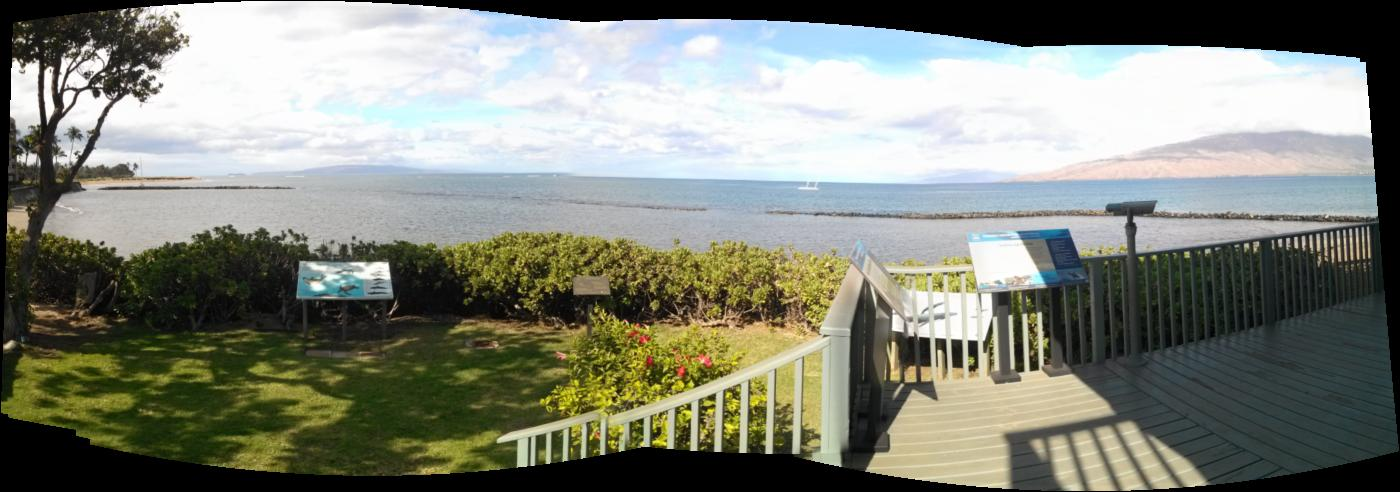
- Panorama view of the Kalepolepo Fishpond seen from the Hawaiian Islands Humpback Whale National Marine Sanctuary facility.

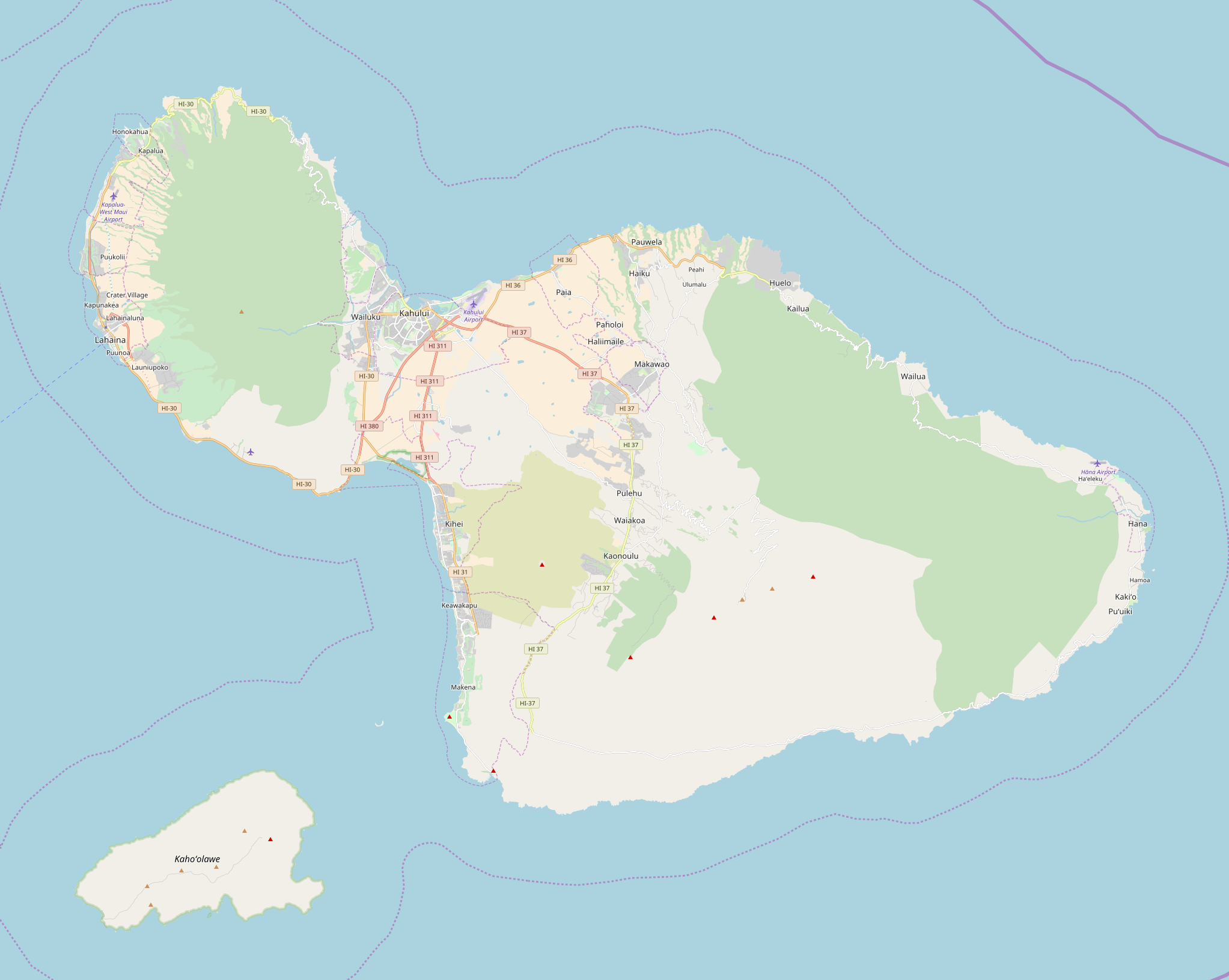
- Location within Maui Location within Hawaii
- Location: S. Kihei Rd., S of jct. with HI 31, Kalepolepo County Park, Kihei, Hawaii
- Coordinates: 20°46′0″N 156°27′45″W
- Area: 3 acres (1.2 ha)
- NRHP reference No.: 96001503
- HRHP No.: 50-50-09-01288

Significant dates
- Added to NRHP: December 30, 1996
- Designated HRHP: December 30, 1996

Kalepolepo Fishpond is an ancient Hawaiian fishpond estimated to have been built between 1400 and 1500 CE.

The fishpond is located in Kalepolepo Park in Kihei, Maui. In 1996, the ʻAoʻao O Na Loka Iʻa O Maui (Association of the Fishponds of Maui) began renovating Koʻieʻie, working closely with the Hawaiian Islands Humpback Whale National Marine Sanctuary.

Koʻieʻie ("rapid current") is classified as a loko kuapa (walled pond), a type of fishpond that uses lava rock and coral walls (kuapa) to keep water circulating while a wooden sluice gate (makaha) allows small fish to enter the pond to feed, but prevents them from leaving after they grow too large to slip between the gate's gaps. Species of fish once farmed by ancient Hawaiians include the awa (milkfish, Chanos chanos), amaʻama (flathead mullet, Mugil cephalus), and the aholehole (Hawaiian Flagtail, Kuhlia xenura).

The fishpond was listed on the National Register of Historic Places in 1996, as Kalepolepo Fishpond with alternate names Koʻieʻie Fishpond and Kaʻonoʻulu Kai Fishpond.
