= Heʻeia, Hawaii =

Census-designated place in Hawaii, United States

Heʻeia
- Census-designated place
- Location in Honolulu County and the state of Hawaii
- Coordinates: 21°25′34″N 157°48′44″W
- Country: United States
- State: Hawaii

Area
  - Total: 3.45 sq mi (8.94 km^{2})
  - Land: 3.20 sq mi (8.29 km^{2})
  - Water: 0.25 sq mi (0.65 km^{2})
- Elevation: 13 ft (4 m)

Population (2020)
  - Total: 5,001
  - Density: 1,562.4/sq mi (603.24/km^{2})
- Time zone: UTC-10 (Hawaii-Aleutian)
- ZIP code: 96744
- Area code: 808
- FIPS code: 15-13900
- GNIS feature ID: 0359149

Heʻeia (Hawaiian pronunciation: [hɛˈʔɛjə]) is a census-designated place comprising several neighborhoods located in the City & County of Honolulu and the Koʻolaupoko District on the island of Oʻahu north of Kāneʻohe. In Hawaiian the words heʻe ʻia mean "washed away", alluding to a victory achieved by the populace against others from leeward Oʻahu, aided by a tsunami that washed the combatants off the shore.

Heʻeia includes Haʻikū Valley and Heʻeia Kea. The population was 5,001 at the 2020 census. The area is almost entirely one of homes and apartments. Parts of Heʻeia lie along Kāneʻohe Bay, but public access is non-existent owing to private ownership of the property behind the shore.

Notable in the Heʻeia area are:

- Haʻikū Valley, a former United States Coast Guard radio transmitter site with the Haiku Stairs
- Site of the former receiving antenna tower for Station HYPO, the naval cryptanalytic station that did so much toward breaking Japanese naval codes in 1941-1942 that resulted in US victory in the Battle of Midway, seen by most historians as the turning point of the Pacific War. The site of their antenna was He'eia, not the site of Station HYPO itself. Station HYPO got its name from the phonetic for the letter "H", because of He'eia where its antenna was sited
- Heʻeia Fishpond, the largest remaining fishpond on Oʻahu

Heʻeia Kea is a community and small, undeveloped valley separated from Heʻeia by Heʻeia Marsh and Kealohi Point. Heʻeia Kea Small Boat Harbor, the only public pier and boat ramp on Kāneʻohe Bay, is found here. Several fishponds have been restored in recent years. Although fishponds were developed on most of the islands, the largest concentrations were found in Keʻehi Lagoon, Pearl Harbor, and Kāneʻohe Bay on Oʻahu.

The U.S. ZIP code for Heʻeia and Heʻeia Kea is the same as for Kāneʻohe: 96744.

== Geography ==
Heʻeia is located at 21°25′34″N 157°48′44″W (21.426200, -157.812248). Heʻeia is essentially part of Kāneʻohe, and the nearest town to the northwest is ʻĀhuimanu, reached by either Kahekili Highway (State Rte. 83) or Kamehameha Highway (State Rte. 830) along the coast.

According to the United States Census Bureau, the CDP has a total area of 3.4 square miles (8.7 km^{2}), of which 3.1 square miles (8.0 km^{2}) is land and 0.27 square miles (0.7 km^{2}) is water. The total area is 7.54% water.

== Demographics ==
Historical population
Census	Pop.	Note	%±
2020	5,001		—
U.S. Decennial Census

As of the census of 2000, there were 4,944 people, 1,557 households, and 1,367 families residing in the CDP. The population density was 2,419.4 inhabitants per square mile (934.1/km^{2}). There were 1,604 housing units at an average density of 784.9 per square mile (303.1/km^{2}). The racial makeup of the CDP was 25.67% White, 0.44% Black or African American, 0.14% Native American, 40.84% Asian, 8.52% Pacific Islander, 0.77% from other races, and 23.62% from two or more races. Hispanic or Latino of any race were 4.83% of the population.

There were 1,557 households, out of which 28.0% had children under the age of 18 living with them, 73.2% were married couples living together, 9.9% had a female householder with no husband present, and 12.2% were non-families. 9.2% of all households were made up of individuals, and 3.8% had someone living alone who was 65 years of age or older. The average household size was 3.17 and the average family size was 3.32.

In the CDP the population was spread out, with 21.4% under the age of 18, 6.9% from 18 to 24, 24.4% from 25 to 44, 31.5% from 45 to 64, and 15.8% who were 65 years of age or older. The median age was 43 years. For every 100 females there were 98.9 males. For every 100 females age 18 and over, there were 96.4 males.

The median income for a household in the CDP was $87,528, and the median income for a family was $90,435. Males had a median income of $55,179 versus $34,983 for females. The per capita income for the CDP was $33,990. None of the families and 0.5% of the population were below the poverty line, including none of those under the age of 18 and none of those ages 65 and older.

== Education ==
The Hawaii Department of Education operates the public schools.

Governor Samuel Wilder King Intermediate School is in the Heʻeia CDP.

Heʻeia Elementary School is in the adjacent Kaneohe CDP.

The Roman Catholic Diocese of Honolulu operates St. Ann Catholic School, K-8, in the Heʻeia CDP.
