= Kahaluʻu Taro Loʻi =

- Kahaluʻu Taro Loʻi Historic District
- U.S. National Register of Historic Places
- U.S. Historic district
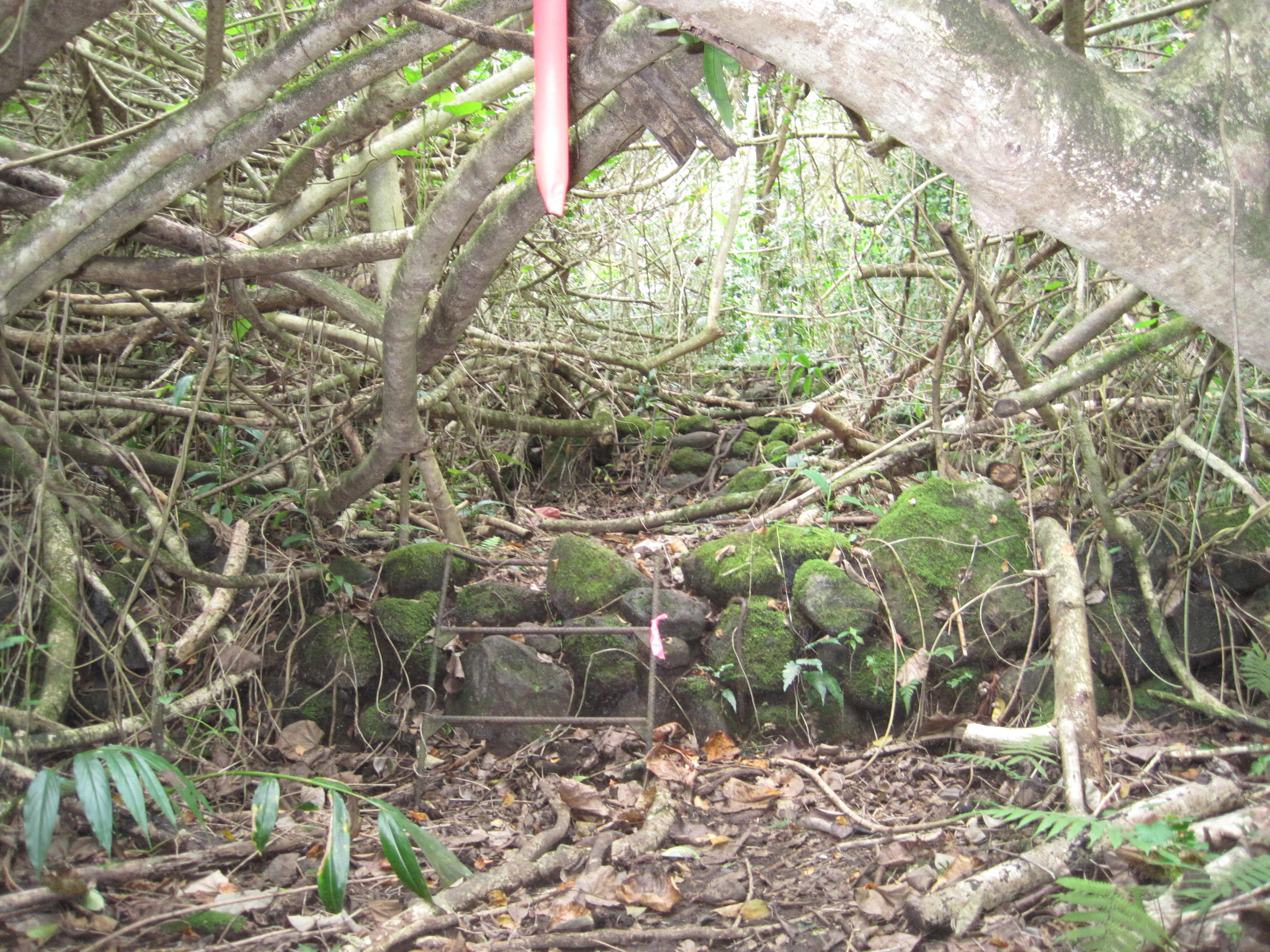
- Terrace walls overgrown by hau trees

- Location within Hawaii
- Nearest city: W of western end of Hui Kelu St., Kāneʻohe, Hawaiʻi
- Coordinates: 21°25′47″N 157°50′31″W
- Area: 22 acres (8.9 ha)
- NRHP reference No.: 73000669
- Added to NRHP: March 14, 1973

The Kahaluʻu Taro Loʻi Historic District, also known as the ʻĀhuimanu Taro Complex, in Kahaluʻu on the windward side of Oʻahu, is the most complex and largest intact system of terraces for growing wetland taro on Oʻahu. It contains at least 18 loʻi (pondfield) terraces once watered by ʻĀhuimanu Stream and associated ʻauwai (irrigation ditches) over about 25 acres (100,000 m^{2}) that start from headwaters just below the cliffs of the Koʻolau Range. It was added to the National Register of Historic Places in 1973, after windward residents raised concerns about development plans in the area. The Kahaluu Fish Pond was also added to the National Register at that time.

The terraces are roughly rectangular in shape and average 5 by 10 meters in size, with front facings of stacked stone ranging up to 2 meters or more in height. The pondfields have all been silted in and are often obscured by heavy overgrowth of hau, mango, and guava trees, but they have withstood many generations of heavy rainfall on steeply sloping hillsides, in silent testimony to ancient Hawaiian expertise in irrigation and flood control. In 1973, a University of Hawaiʻi archaeology program field school excavated soil profiles from the terraces, and the site was cleared during the 1980s, but the State of Hawaiʻi Historic Preservation Division is now seeking community organizations willing to clear the site and make it operational again.

The site is owned by Temple Valley Corp., which has continued to develop new houses around it. At the time of the NRHP nomination, the Historic District was said to lie 900 meters west of the west end of Hui Kelu Street and to be accessible via an abandoned jeep road. Even as late as July 1996, a hiker described returning via the jeep road. But Hui Kelu Street has since been extended across ʻĀhuimanu Stream, where the hiking trail begins, and the lower portion of the jeep road is now Heno Place.

== Gallery ==
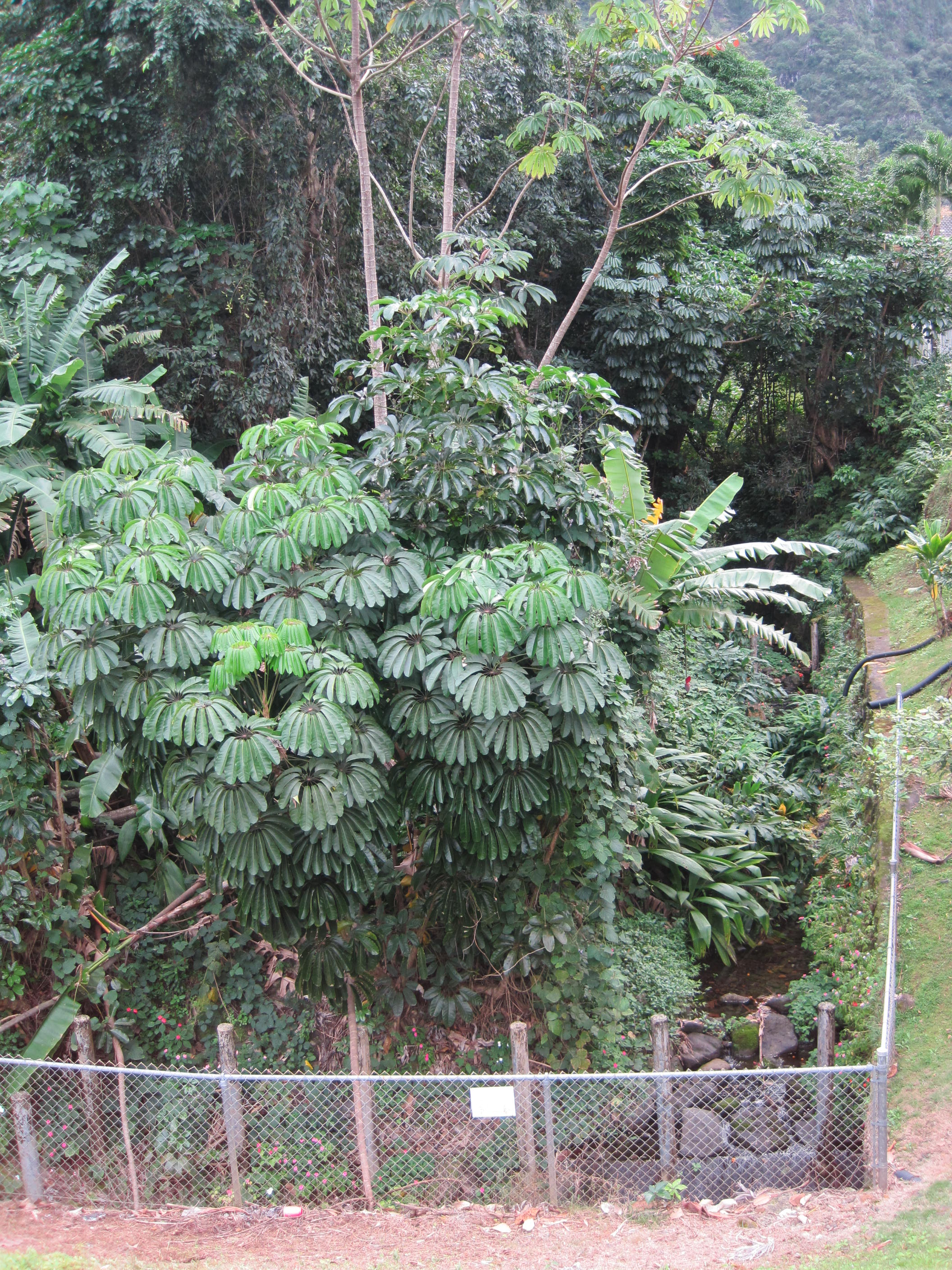
ʻĀhuimanu Stream fence and tunnel at Hui Kelu St.

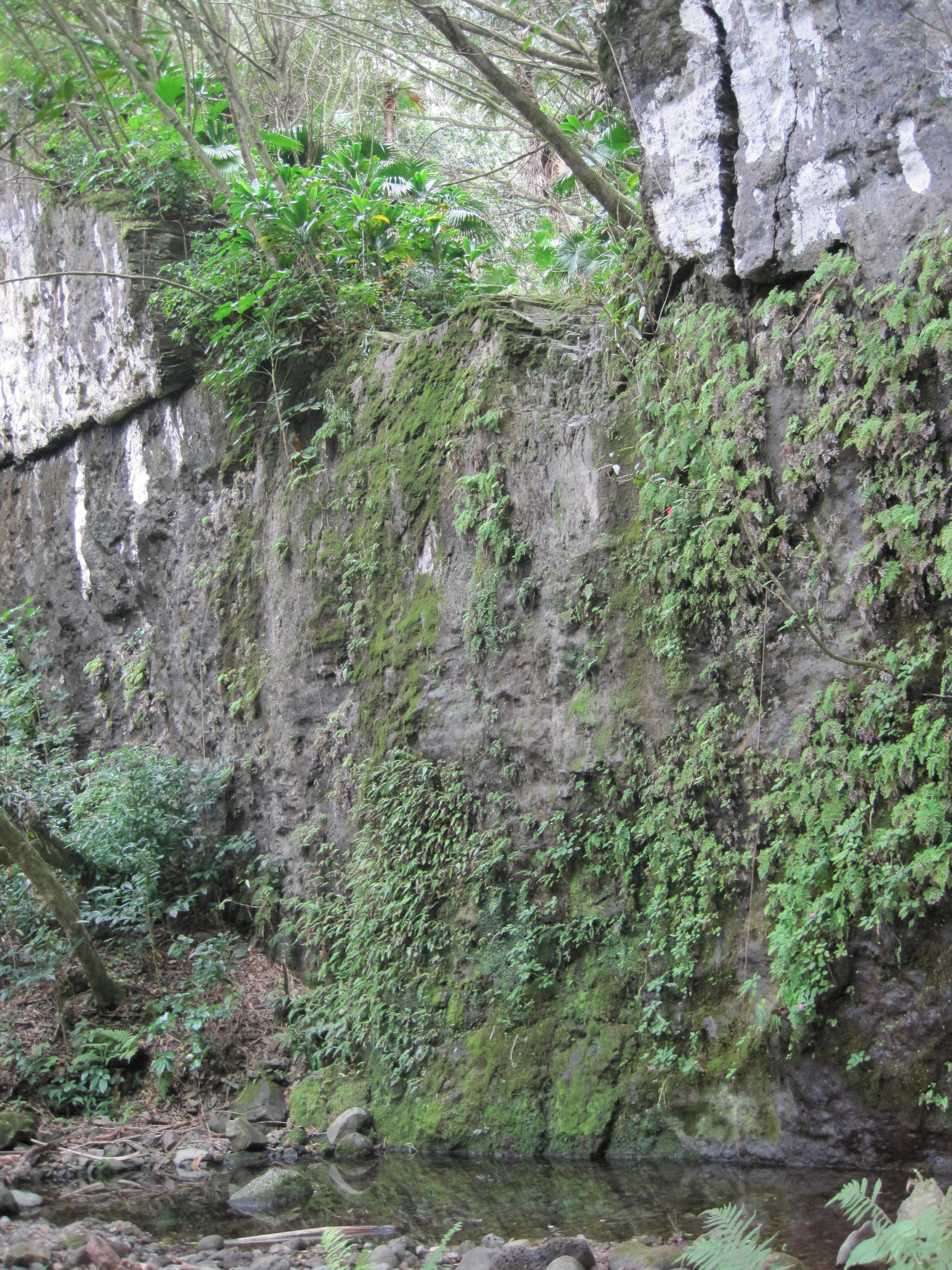
Waterfall site at headwaters

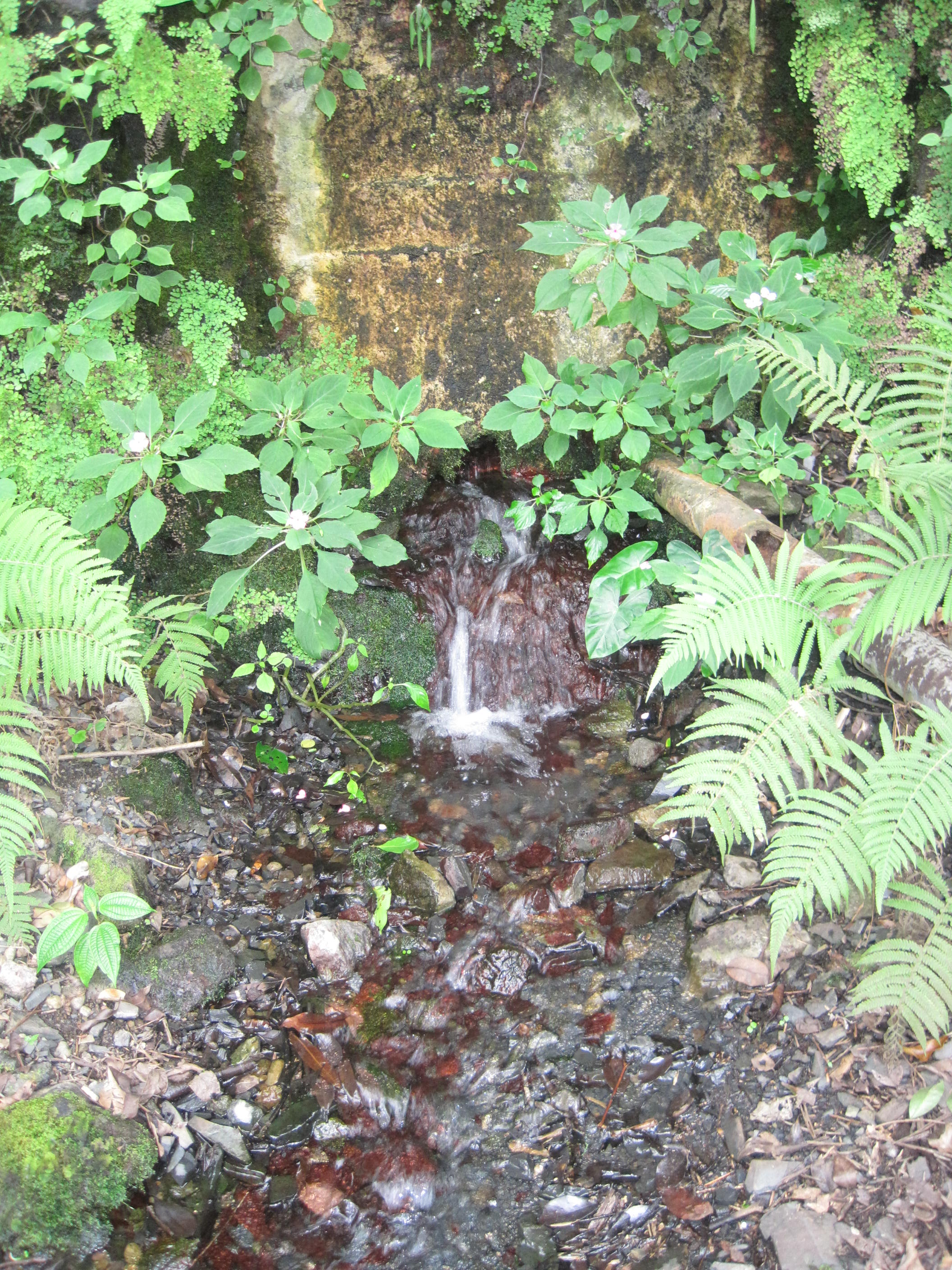
Spring and old water pipe at headwaters

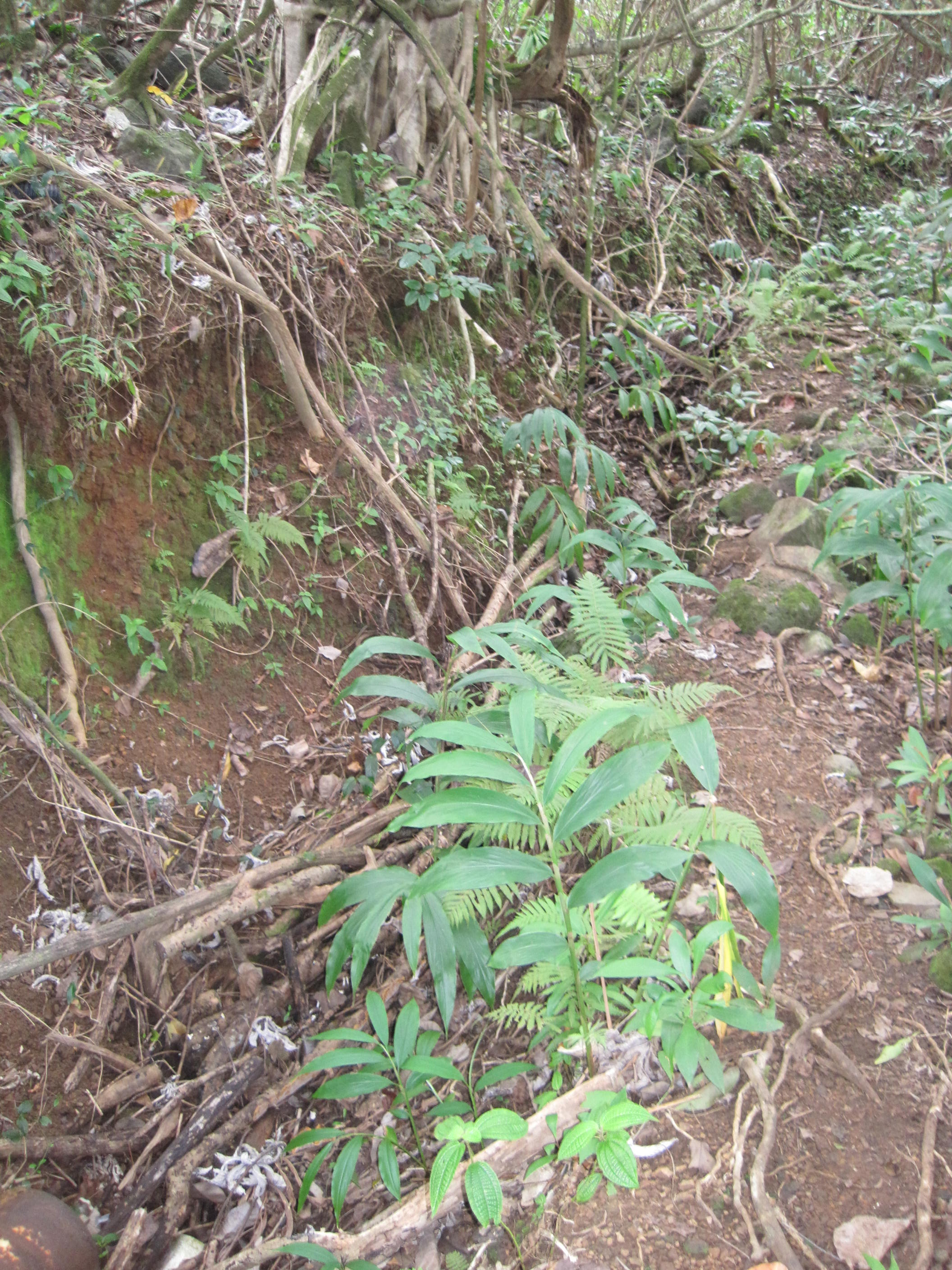
Old ʻauwai above the stream

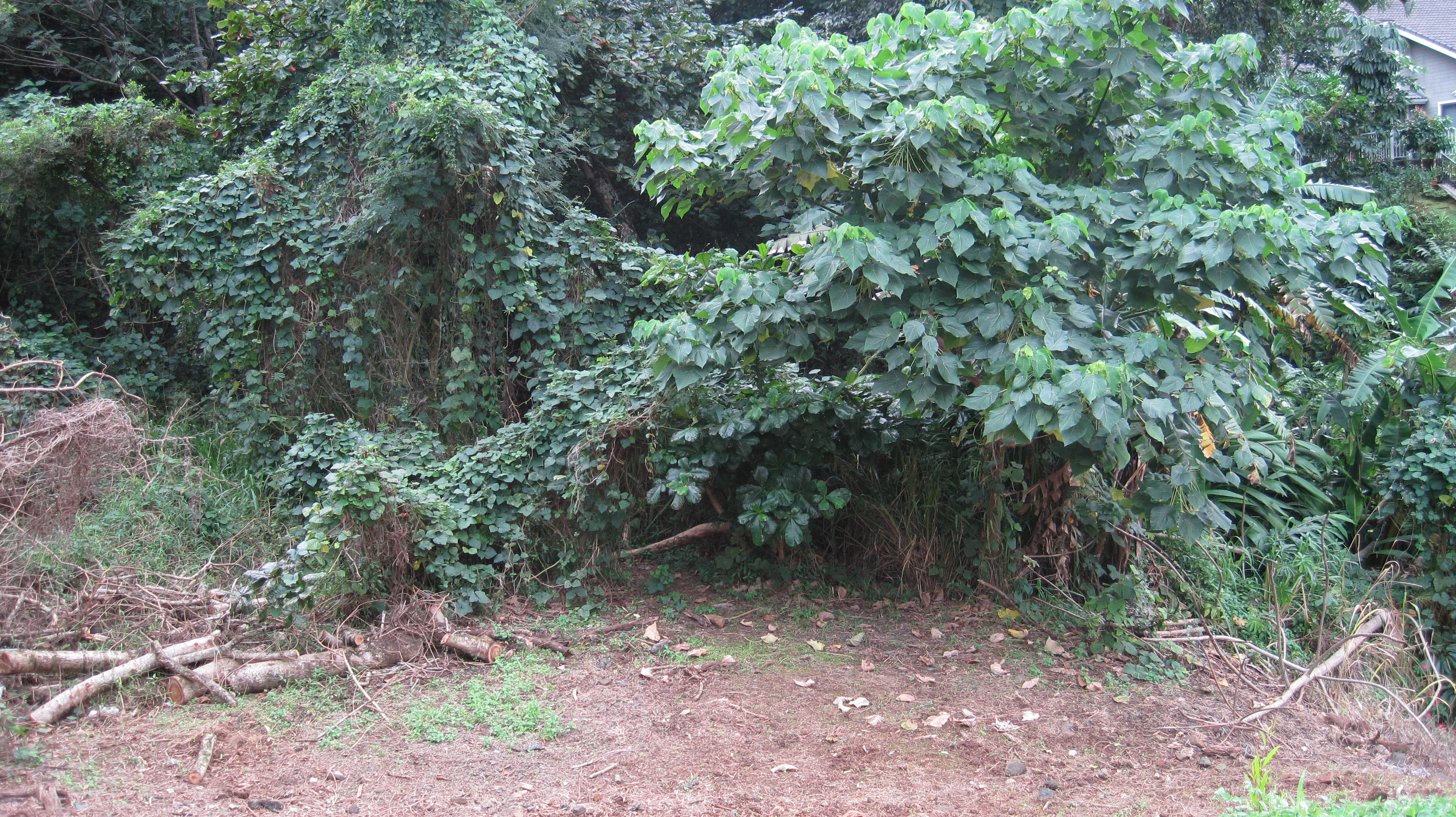
Overgrown trailhead at ʻĀhuimanu Stream and Hui Kelu St.

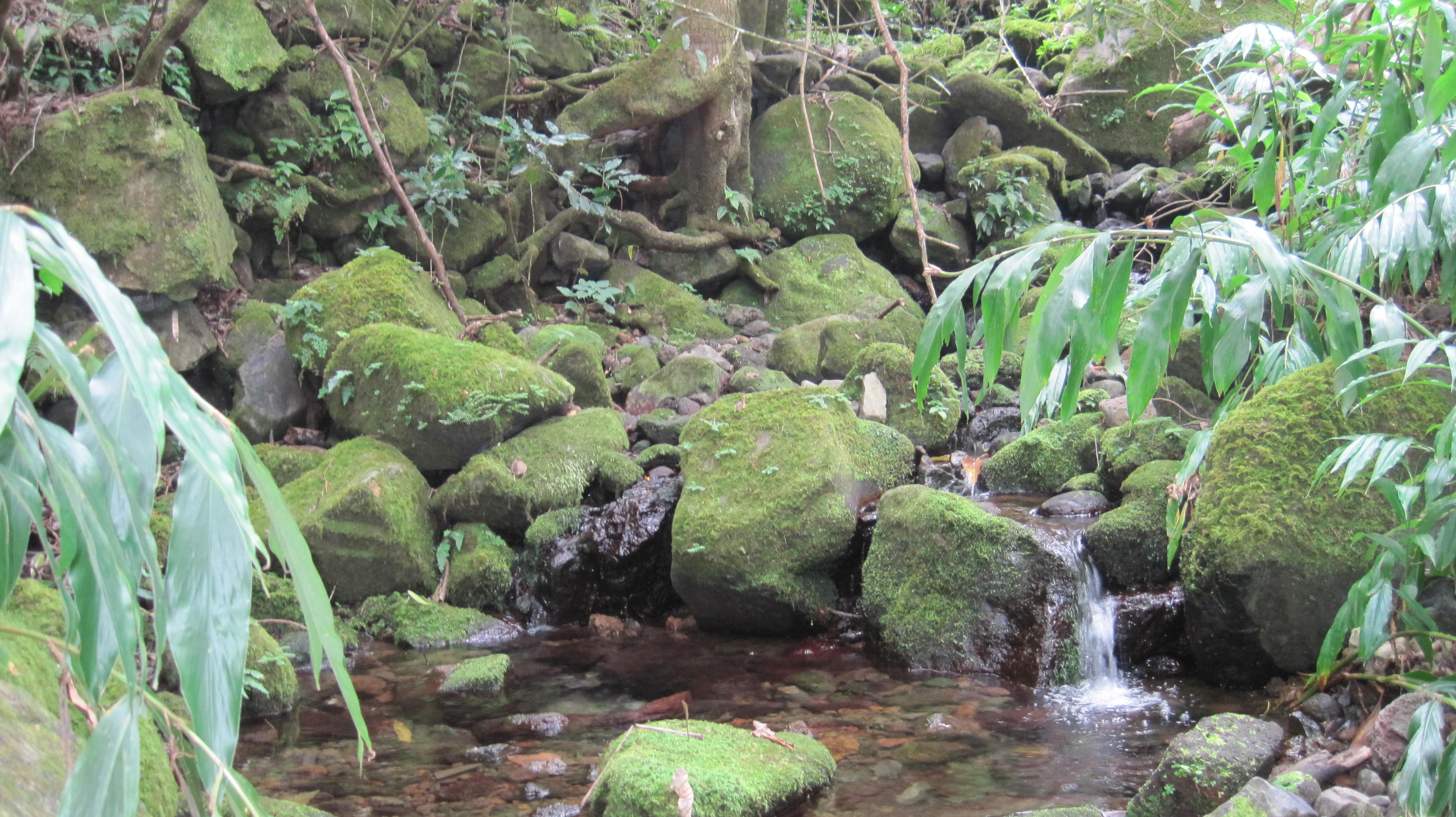
ʻĀhuimanu Stream crossing

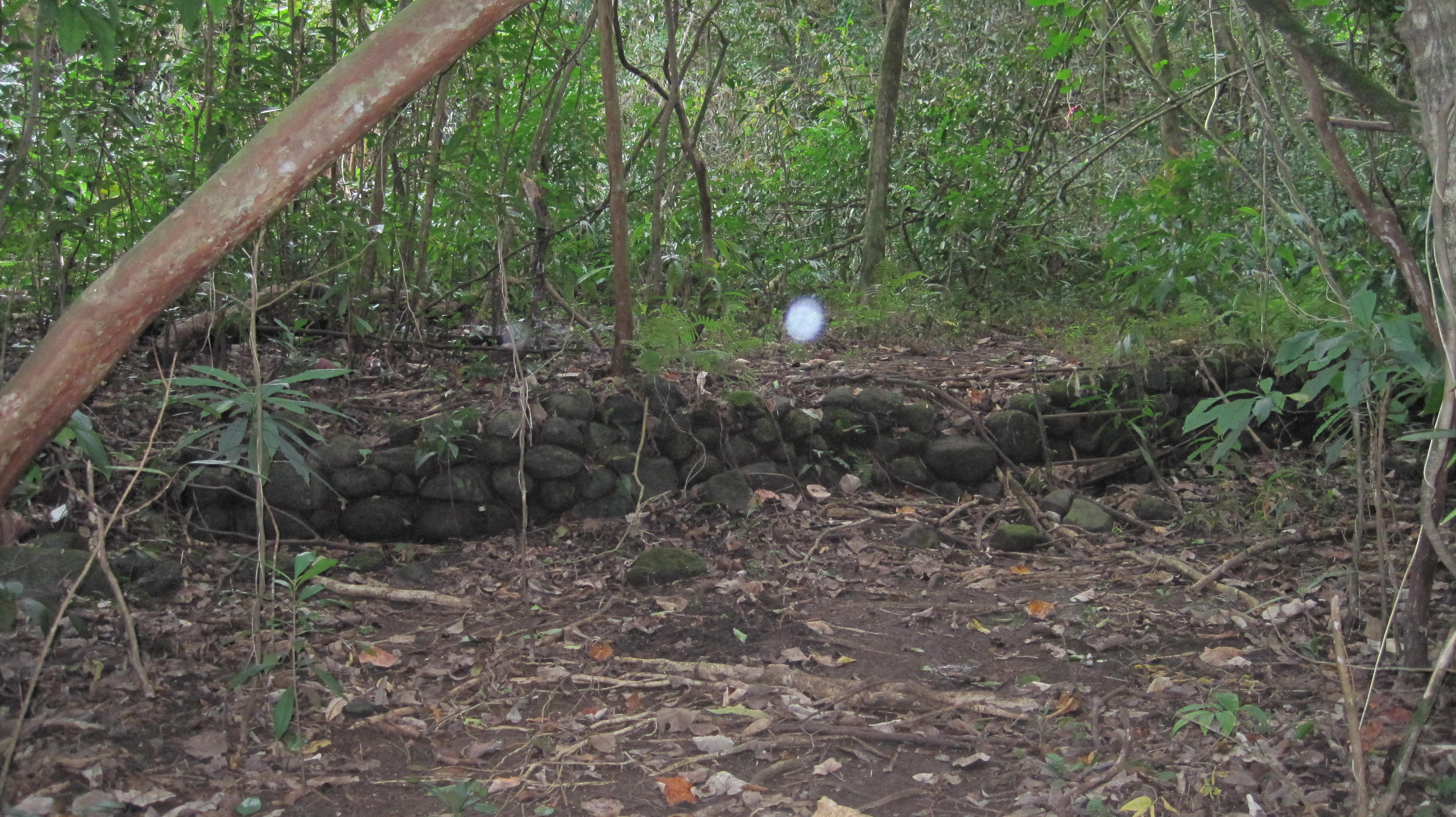
Low terrace wall

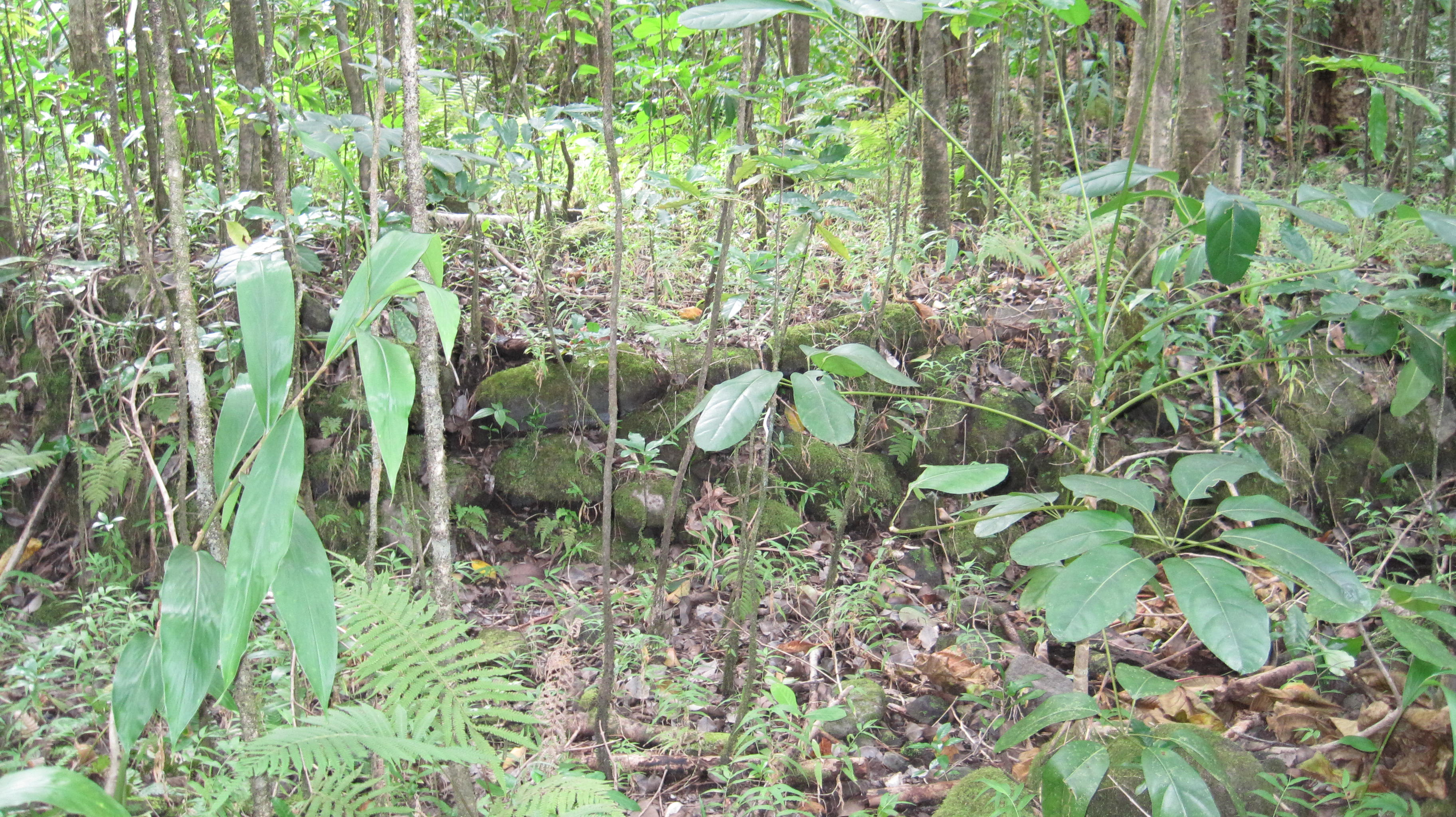
Low terrace wall surrounded by saplings
