= Heʻeia State Park =

State park in Hawaii, United States

- IUCN category II (national park)
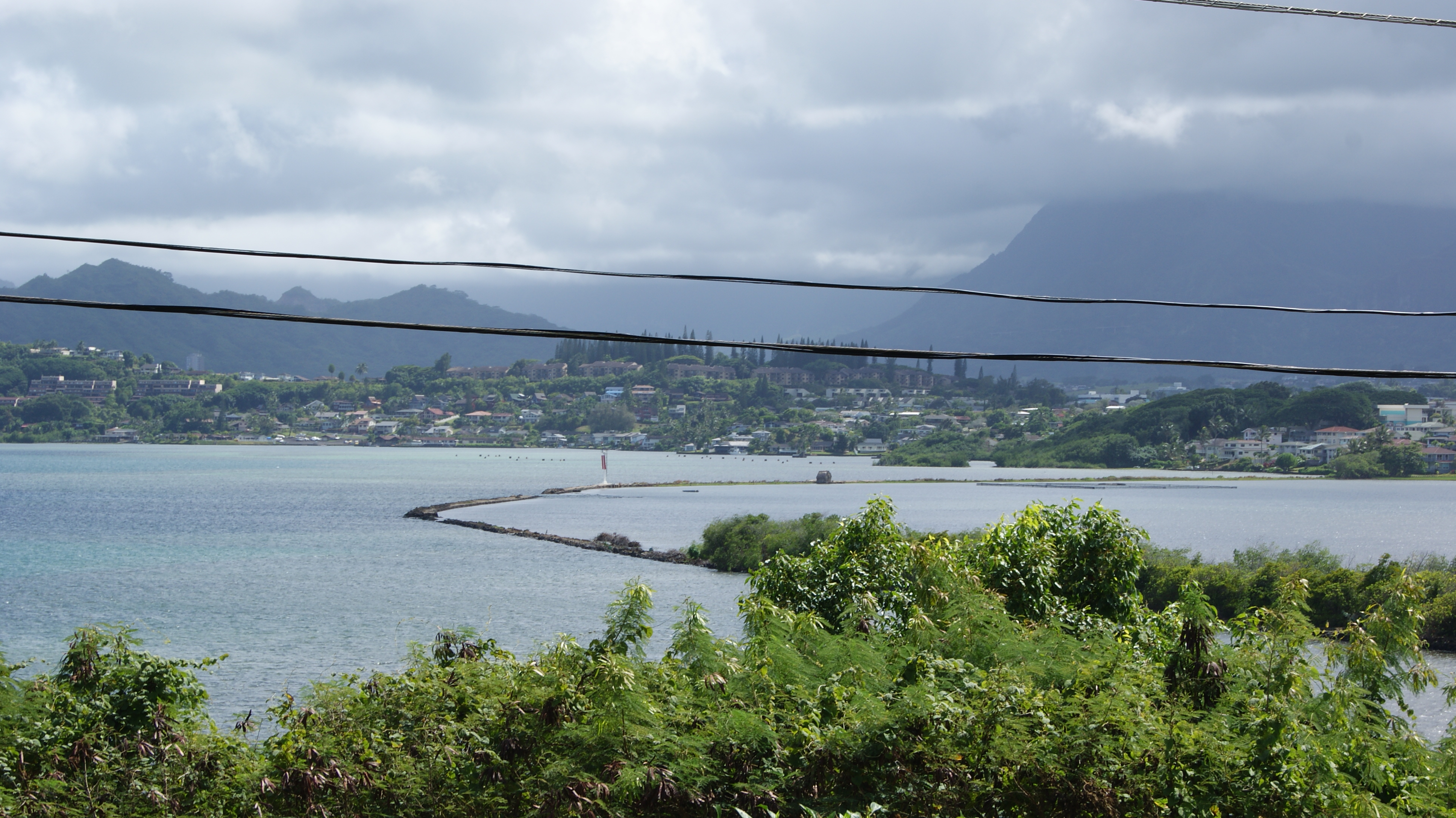

- Location within Oahu Location within Hawaii
- Location: Kaneohe, Hawaii, Hawaii, United States
- Coordinates: 21°26′23″N 157°48′32″W
- Area: 18.5 acres (7.5 ha)
- Established: 1977
- Named for: Grandson of ʻOlopana
- Governing body: DLNR, Division of State Parks

Heʻeia State Park is an 18.5 acre state park located near Kaneohe on the windward shore of the Hawaiian island of Oahu. The park is located on Kaneohe Bay, between Heʻeia Fishpond and Heʻeia Kea small boat harbor.
