= Huilua Fishpond =

- U.S. National Register of Historic Places
- U.S. National Historic Landmark
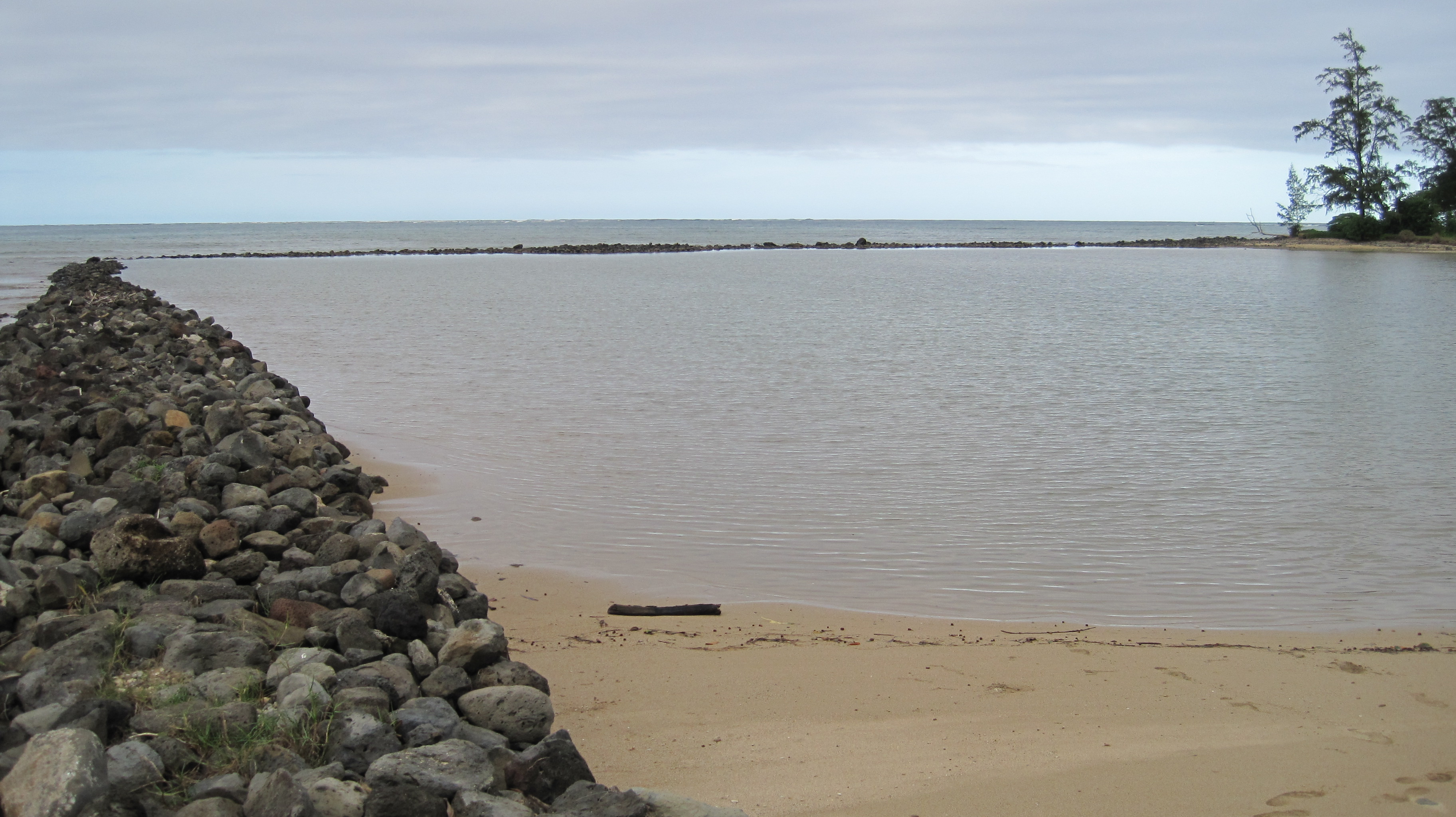
- Rock walls of Huilua Fishpond

- Location within Hawaii
- Nearest city: Kaneohe, Oʻahu, Hawaii
- Coordinates: 21.55743°N 157.868302°W
- NRHP reference No.: 66000295

Significant dates
- Added to NRHP: October 15, 1966
- Designated NHL: December 29, 1962

Huilua Fishpond, in Ahupuaʻa O Kahana State Park on windward Oʻahu, is one of the few surviving ancient Hawaiian fishponds that were still operational well into the 20th century. It was declared a U.S. National Historic Landmark in 1962, shortly after it had been severely damaged by the 1960 tsunami. It was added to the National Register of Historic Places on December 29, 1962.

The fishpond may have started as a sandbar where ocean currents met the stream mouth. A 500-foot (152 m) permeable rock seawall (called kuapā in Hawaiian) was added along the shoreline to enclose about 7 acres (2.8 ha) of fertile brackish water. The wall was about 4 feet (1.2 m) wide and stood about 4 feet (1.2 m) above high tide, with two lashed-pole sluice gates (called mākāhā) that allowed little fish in but kept bigger fish from escaping. The name Huilua, which can be translated 'join-twice', may refer to the two gates. The favorite type of fish in the pond were ʻamaʻama (flathead grey mullet), which reproduce in the ocean but can live in either fresh, brackish, or salt water.

Many Hawaiian fishponds were built between about the early 1400s and early 1600s. They were especially numerous in large expanses of shallow sea, such as Kāneʻohe Bay and Pearl Harbor. Each fishpond had a pondkeeper (kiaʻi loko) who lived nearby and oversaw its maintenance. Sam Pua Haʻaheo was the pondkeeper for Huilua from 1924, just after the 1923 tsunami, until 1946, when another tsunami hit. The fishpond suffered further tsunami damage in 1957 and 1960. The most recent restoration work began in 1993 as a cooperative project between the State Park service and Friends of Kahana, an organization of local residents.

== Gallery ==
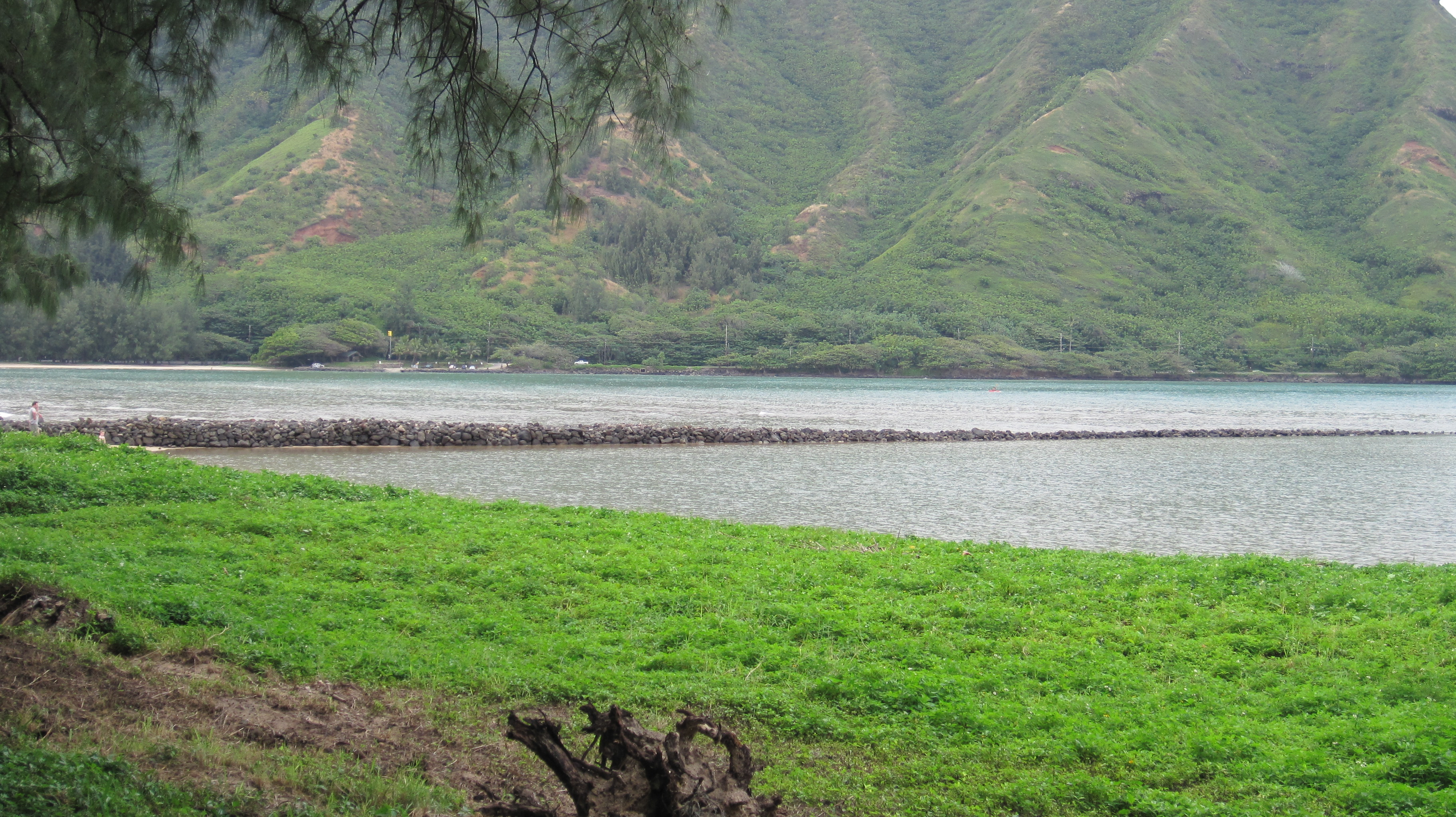
View across Kahana Bay

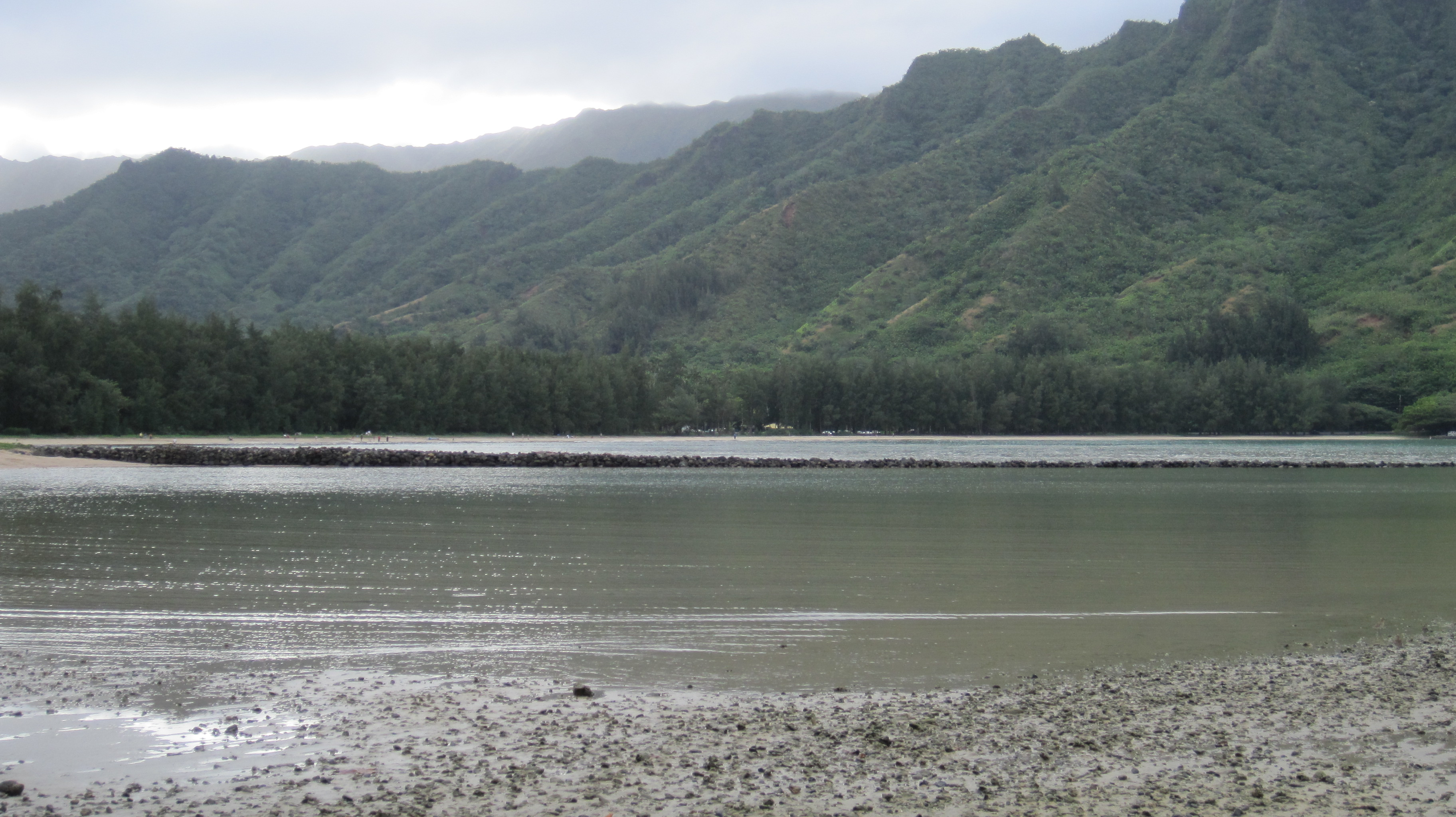
View toward Kahana Valley

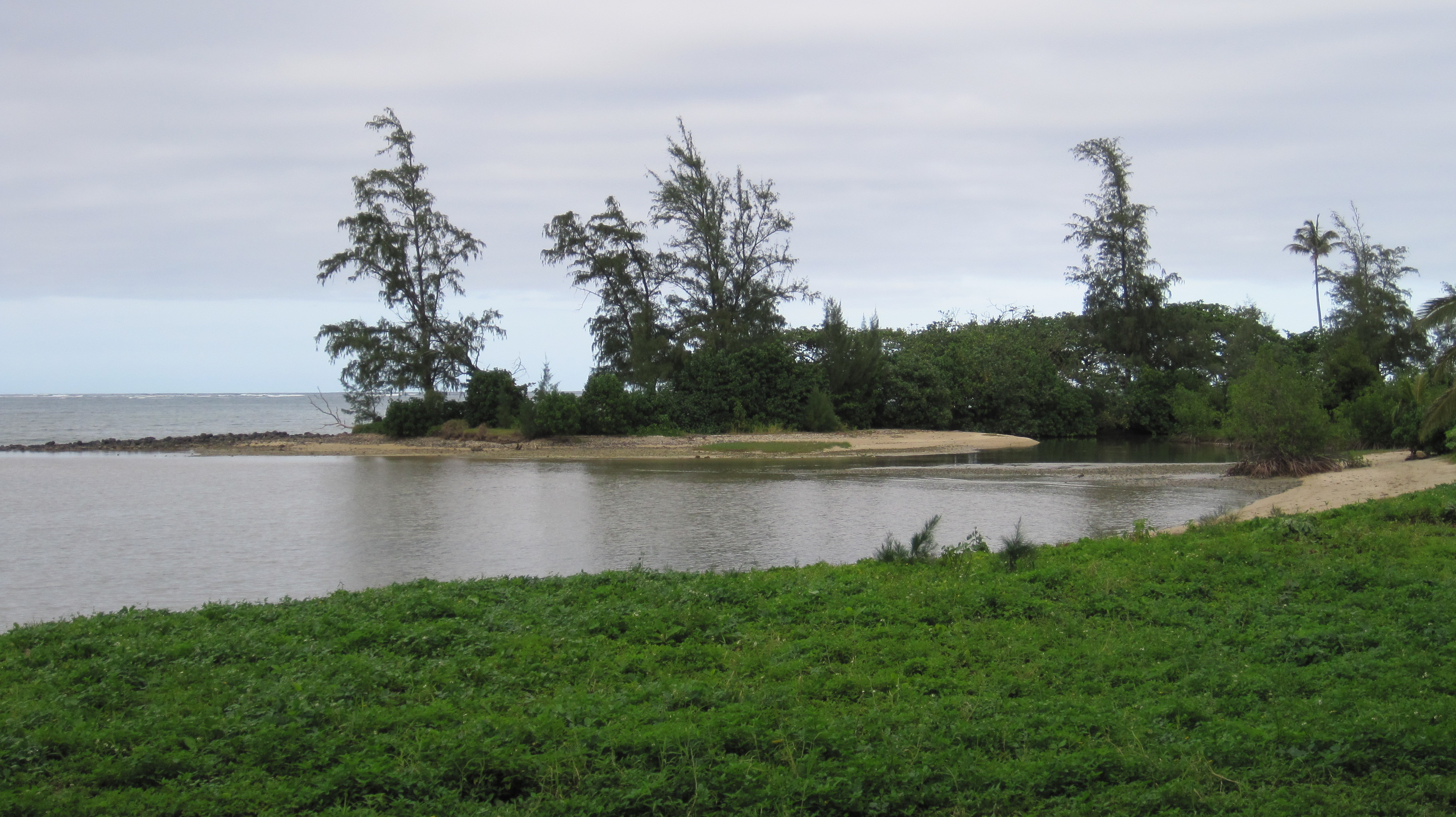
Sandbar, mudflats, and mangroves at seaward end
