= Heʻeia Fishpond =

Historic Hawaiian fishpond

- U.S. National Register of Historic Places
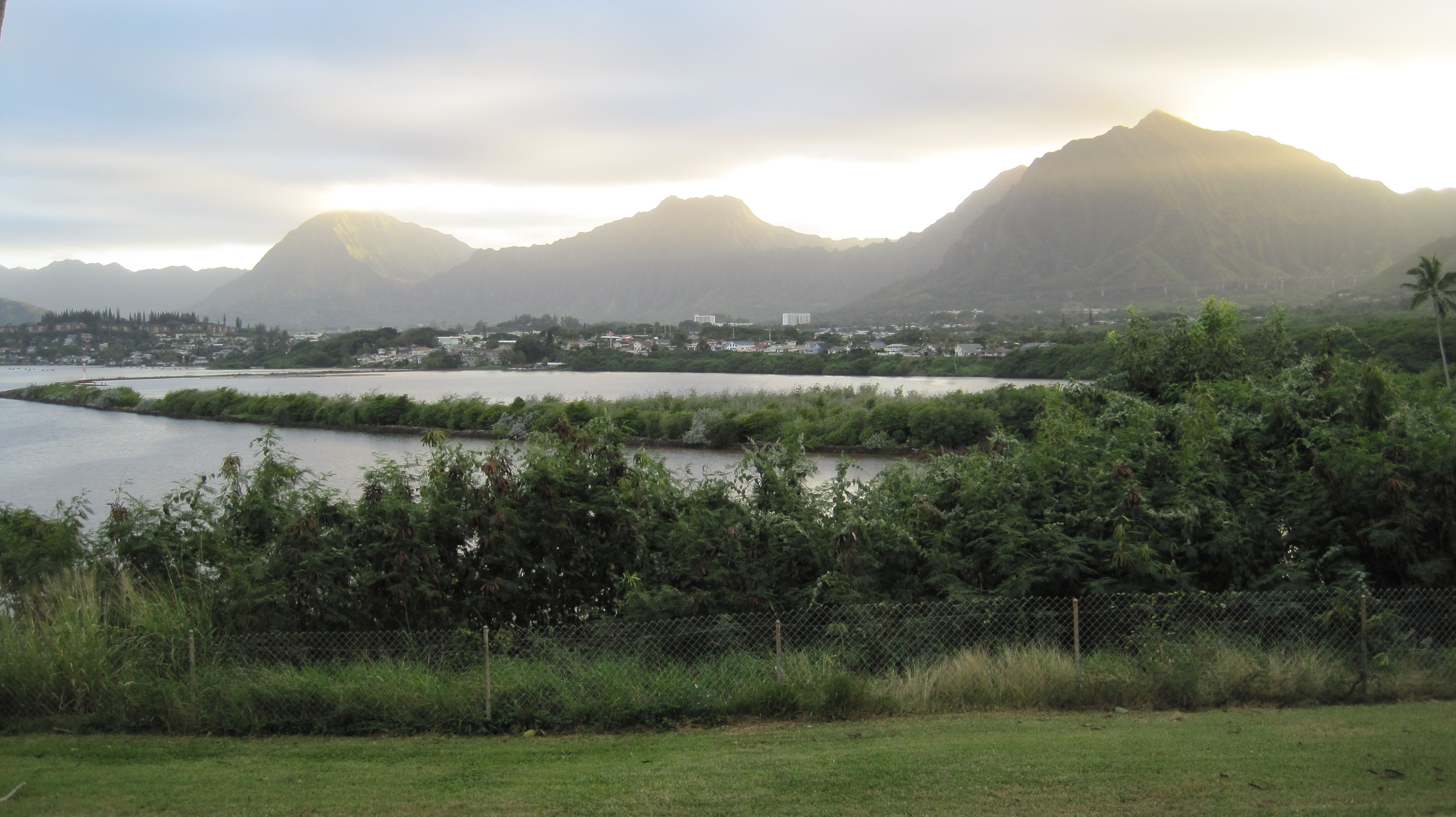
- A view of Heʻeia Fishpond on January 1, 2010, looking south-southeast from Heʻeia State Park.

- Location within Oahu Location within Hawaii Location within United States
- Location: Heʻeia, Hawaii
- Nearest city: Kāneʻohe, Hawaii
- Coordinates: 21°25′50.8″N 157°48′23.7″W
- Area: 88 acres (36 ha)
- Architectural style: Walled coastal pond (loko iʻa kuapā)
- Restored: Restoration began 1988
- Restored by: Mary Brooks Paepae o Heʻeia
- Website: paepaeoheeia.org
- NRHP reference No.: 73000671
- Added to NRHP: January 17, 1973

Heʻeia Fishpond (Hawaiian: Loko Iʻa O Heʻeia) is an ancient Hawaiian fishpond located at Heʻeia on the island of Oahu in Hawaii. A walled coastal pond (loko iʻa kuapā), it is the only Hawaiian fishpond fully encircled by a wall (kuapā). Constructed sometime between the early 1200s and early 1400s, it was badly damaged by a 1965 flood and fell into disrepair. A protected area, it was added to the U.S. National Register of Historic Places in 1973. An effort begun in 1988 is underway to restore the fishpond as a fishery, cultural, scientific, and educational resource.

== Physical characteristics ==
Heʻeia Fishpond is a "kuapā-style" fishpond, or walled coastal pond (Hawaiian: loko iʻa kuapā), enclosing an area of 88 acres (36 ha) in southern Kāneʻohe Bay on the coast of Oahu at Heʻeia, Hawaii. It is the second-largest of at least 20 fishponds which once lay along the shore of Kāneʻohe Bay. About a quarter of its circumference is bounded on its southwestern side by private homes constructed on a bluff overlooking the bay. Another quarter lies along Heʻeia Stream, which demarcates the fishpond′s boundary with Heʻeia State Park to the northwest. Kāneʻohe Bay itself lies along the rest of the fishpond′s boundary.

Uniquely among Hawaiian fishponds, Heʻeia Fishpond has a wall (kuapā) which completely encircles it on both its seaward and landward sides; other Hawaiian fishponds have a wall — either semicircular or built in a straight line — which extends only from one point on the shoreline to another. On its seaward side, the wall is built on Malaukaʻa, a fringing reef. The wall may be the longest found in any Hawaiian fishpond, extending for an estimated 1.3 miles (2.1 km), or 7,000 feet (2,100 m).

The wall varies in width from 12 to 15 feet (3.7 to 4.6 m) and is 5 feet (1.5 m) tall. It is a compact structure which consists of two separate rock walls built of volcanic basalt rock (pohaku pele), with the gap between the two walls filled with coral (loʻa) or, in a few parts of the wall, dirt. The wall was constructed using the Hawaiian dry-stack wall building (Uhau Humu Pohaku ) technique, which uses no mortar.

Heʻeia Fishpond ranges from 3 to 4 feet (0.9 to 1.2 m) in depth. Its design allows it to create a brackish water (wai hapa kai) environment by mixing fresh water (wai) from shore with salt water (kai) from Kāneʻohe Bay. The drainage basin which feeds Heʻeia Stream extends from Kāneʻohe Bay inland about 3.2 miles (5.1 km) to the summit of the Koolau Range at an altitude of about 2,820 feet (860 m) and covers 3.6 square miles (9.324 km).^{2}. The ancient Hawaiians planted taro (kalo) in the drainage basin, and their practice of flooding the taro patches (lōʻiīkalo) with stream water as a means of irrigation maintained water quality by reducing the amount of sediment in water reaching Heʻeia Fishpond via Heʻeia Stream. Before it empties into Kāneʻohe Bay, the stream (kahawai) passes along the northwestern perimeter of the fishpond. The wall has seven functioning sluice gates (mākāhā), with those along Heʻeia Stream regulating the flow of fresh water into the pond and those along the seaward side of the wall regulating the tidal flow of salt water between the fishpond and Kāneʻohe Bay. The wall′s design also slows the flow of water so that the pond maintains a base water level even during the lowest tides, and forces more water through the sluice gates.

Each sluice gate has an inner and outer gate. Closing both gates encloses an area 10 to 15 feet (3.0 to 4.6 m) in length, trapping any marine life too large to escape through the gates and greatly simplifying the harvesting of food fish. At least some of the gates have a small hut (hale) adjacent to them to provide shelter to people monitoring and operating the gate.

Although sources agree that Heʻeia Fishpond has seven functioning sluice gates, they disagree on details about the gates. According to one source, the wall has three working sluice gates along Heʻeia Stream and four along the seaward side of the wall facing Kāneʻohe Bay. Another states that the fishpond has eight sluice gates, three along Heʻeia Stream and five facing Kāneʻohe Bay, but that one of the gates along the stream is in disrepair and no longer contributes to the flow of fresh water into the fishpond.

== Plant and animal life ==
Hawaii lacks the lagoons found at atolls elsewhere in the Pacific Ocean, and Heʻeia Fishpond, like other Hawaiian fishponds, in effect creates a marine environment similar to that found in many lagoons. The brackish water maintained in the fishpond and its 3-to-4-foot (0.9 to 1.2 m) depth are ideal for the growth of phytoplankton and a wide variety of edible seaweed and edible marine algae known collectively to the Hawaiians as limu. By cultivating limu, the fishpond's caretaker or guardian (kiaʻi) can establish a fishery by raising herbivorous fish in the pond without having to feed them, similar to the way in which a rancher on land can feed livestock by allowing it to graze on grass. Fish species found in the pond include flathead grey mullet (ʻamaʻama), milkfish (awa), ringtail surgeonfish (pualu), eyestripe surgeonfish (palani), flagtail (āholehole), Pacific threadfin (moi), porcupinefish or burrfish (kōkala), barracuda (kākū), small barred jack and island jack (pāpio), longjaw bonefish and shortjaw bonefish (ʻōʻio), whitesaddle goatfish (Parupeneus porphyreus or kūmū), and yellowstripe goatfish (wekeʻaʻa). The pond also is home to various species of crab (pāpaʻi), shrimp (ʻōpae), and eel (puhi).

When they are small enough, fish enter the fishpond via the sluice gates to feed on phytoplankton and limu. They then remain within it because of the abundance of food and become too large to get back into Kāneʻohe Bay via the sluice gates. Trapped within the fishpond, they continue to feed and grow until they reach a size suitable for harvest, which in the case of mullet takes about three years. The fish tend to be attracted to the sluice gates during high tide because of the influx of salt water, and this makes those that are of an appropriate size for harvesting easy to trap and catch in the sluice gates without risking harm to those which are still too small.

== History ==
Heʻeia Fishpond apparently was constructed sometime between the early 1200s and early 1400s. While coral used in its construction was available in waters adjacent to the fishpond, the basalt rock required for its wall had to be brought to the site from at least 2 miles (3.2 km) away. The fishpond took an estimated two to three years to build and probably required the labor of hundreds, if not thousands, of workers; one source claims that as many as 10,000 workers constructed the fishpond. Anthropologists and archaeologists believe that the fishpond played as important a role in meeting the nutritional needs of the local population as the taro (kalo) fields in the area and estimate that after its completion, the fishpond supported a community of several thousand people in the Heʻeia area. According to at least one account, King Kamehameha I himself may have at one time contributed to the maintenance of Heʻeia Fishpond.

The concept of land ownership in the Western sense was unknown to the Hawaiian people until the Great Māhele of March 7, 1848, in which King Kamehameha III sought to redistribute land in the Kingdom of Hawaii so as to create a Western-style system of private land ownership. The Great Māhele assigned most of the land in the Heʻeia area, including the fishpond, to High Chief Abner Kuhoʻoheiheipahu Pākī, making him the first recorded owner of Heʻeia Fishpond. Upon his death in 1855, his daughter Bernice Pauahi Bishop inherited the land from him, and when she died in 1884 her will directed that her lands be used to create what became known as the Bernice Pauahi Bishop Estate and fund what became the Kamehameha Schools. The Kamehameha Schools still own the fishpond today.

Presumably, Heʻeia Fishpond underwent various alterations over the centuries in response to events such as storms, floods, and tsunamis. From around the 1860s, the conversion of taro (kalo) fields first into rice paddies, then into cattle pastures and sugar cane and pineapple fields, increased erosion and threatened Heʻeia Fishpond with sedimentation, as these new uses of the land in the Heʻeia drainage basin lacked the effectiveness of taro patches (lōʻiīkalo) in removing sediment. The oldest photographs of Heʻeia Fishpond show that between 1880 and 1910 it still had a well-maintained wall, and that the surrounding area included several smaller ponds and fields of banana, taro, pineapple, rice, and sugar cane. Invasive mangrove was introduced to the Heʻeia area around 1922, and development encroached on the fishpond between the 1930s and the 1960s, but the fishpond remained a prominent landmark on the coast of Oahu. It was still in use when on May 2, 1965, the destructive Keapuka Flood struck the area and damaged over 1,000 feet (305 m) of the fishpond′s wall, destroying over 200 feet (61 m) of it. The fishpond fell into disuse and disrepair for over 20 years after the flood, allowing the mangrove trees to invade it and sediment to build up within it.

By the time of the 1965 flood, land developers had begun to eye the fishpond as a site for potential construction, and they succeeded in having portions of the fishpond rezoned from "agricultural" to "urban," which permitted builders to fill in and develop the rezoned area. The local community countered by getting the fishpond placed on the National Register of Historic Places on January 17, 1973, and in 1974 the fishpond was rezoned as conservation land.

Mary Brooks, an aquaculturalist, leased Heʻeia Fishpond in 1989. She and volunteers already had begun temporary repairs to the damaged wall in 1988. The most serious breach the 1965 flood made in the wall was an 80-foot (24 m) gap which had once included a sluice gate (mākāhā). In this gap, ocean currents subsequently scoured the seabed up to 6 feet (1.8 m) below grade where the wall had stood in 1965. In 1992, Brooks and her volunteers completed a temporary 253-foot (77 m) angular wall made up of 70 cubic yards (54 m^{3}) of concrete in waters to landward of the gap where scouring had lowered the seabed level by only 3 feet (0.9 m).

Brooks experimented with aquaculture at the fishpond and had success in raising flathead grey mullet (ʻamaʻama), Pacific threadfin (moi), tilapia, and the edible red seaweed Gracilaria (known as ogonori or "ogo"). During the 1990s, Brooks developed a curriculum for instruction in fishpond management concepts and techniques. In 2000 she joined the University of Hawaiʻi and the Kamakakūokalani Center for Hawaiian Studies in developing and offering the first fishpond management (Mālama Loko Iʻa) class at the University of Hawaiʻi at Mānoa , and her students began to participate in restoration work at the fishpond. The class in turn led to the founding in 2001 of Paepae o Heʻeia ("Threshold of Heʻeia"), a private non-profit organization dedicated to restoring and managing Heʻeia Fishpond. Paepae o Heʻeia became the fishpond's official steward in 2003, with a goal of providing both nutritional and cultural sustenance to the local population, as well as a scientific and educational resource for studies of both the coastal environment and the culture of the Native Hawaiians.

In September 2006, Paepae o Heʻeia offered for sale the first harvest of Pacific threadfin (moi) from Heʻeia Fishpond since restoration work began. In early 2007, Paepae o Heʻeia estimated that the fishpond, once restored, had the potential to support a population of 1,500 people.

On November 20, 2023, a United States Navy P-8A Poseidon aircraft overshot the runway at Marine Corps Air Station Kaneohe Bay and came to rest in shallow water in Kaneohe Bay about 1.5 miles (2.4 km) upwind of the fishpond. The incident raised concerns that a jet fuel leak from the plane could damage the local environment, including the fish pond itself.

== Restoration ==
Paepae o Heʻeia's restoration work at Heʻeia Fishpond consists of various programs. By the spring of 2007, Paepae o Heʻeia was hosting community workdays twice a month, during each of which 40 to 100 volunteers performed restoration activities under Paepae o Heʻeia oversight.

=== Mangrove removal ===
The invasive mangroves introduced to the Heʻeia area sometime around 1922 — primarily red mangrove (Rhizophora mangle) — grew unchecked throughout Heʻeia Fishpond after the 1965 flood, damaging the fishpond's wall and causing an accelerated build-up of silt. Brooks started to remove the mangroves in the late 1990s, and their removal began in earnest under the stewardship of Paepae o Heʻeia. By early 2007, 3,000 volunteers had participated in mangrove removal over the previous three years, removing 30,000 square feet (2,800 m^{2}) of invasive mangroves. As of 2018, mangroves had been cleared from 4,800 feet (1,463 m) of the 7,000-foot (2,134 m) wall. When possible, the mangrove wood harvested during the removal is used as firewood or as an insect-resistant building material.

=== Wall repair and rehabilitation ===
The damage to the Heʻeia Fishpond wall resulting from the 1965 flood, the growth of mangrove roots, and the activities of eels varied from a few stones missing from its top in some places to portions where the wall had broken down all the way to its foundation (niho) stones. Repair and restoration of the wall requires the removal from it of invasive plant species — mangroves, pluchea, pickleweed, and other weeds — followed by repair or reconstruction of the outer basalt portions of the wall and filling the gap between them with coral. Between early 2004 and early 2007, when wall repairs cost about US$1,500 per 100 feet (30 m), volunteers repaired about 600 feet (180 m) of the wall and by early 2007 six of the wall′s sluice gates (mākāhā) were functioning. By 2008, the temporary 1992 concrete wall was failing, and required replacement by a permanent wall repair. In December 2015, the largest hole in the wall was closed. A 164-foot (50 m) section of the wall destroyed in 1965 was not rebuilt to the same height as the original wall, and as a result water can flow between the fishpond and Kāneʻohe Bay over this portion of the wall during high tide.

=== Invasive seaweed removal ===
Removal of invasive seaweed — primarily Kappaphycus, Acanthophora spicifera, and Gracilaria salicornia — from Heʻeia Fishpond began in 2004, and by 2018 Paepae o He‘eia had removed over 50 short tons (45 long tons; 45 tonnes) of it. The seaweed is rich in potassium, and when possible is provided to farmers for use as a fertilizer. In 2019, Paepae o He‘eia began partnering with the Heʻeia National Estuarine Research Reserve System (NERRS) and The Nature Conservancy to enhance invasive seaweed removal efforts.

=== Other work ===
In 2020, the University of Hawaiʻi began a project that included the installation of bioretention basins on storm drain outlets which capture storm water from over 50 homes and street surfaces and empty into Heʻeia Fishpond. The bioretention basins are intended to improve water quality in the fishpond by removing as many pollutants as possible before water from storm drains enters the fishpond.

== See also ==
- Ancient Hawaiian aquaculture
