= Ancient Hawaiian aquaculture =

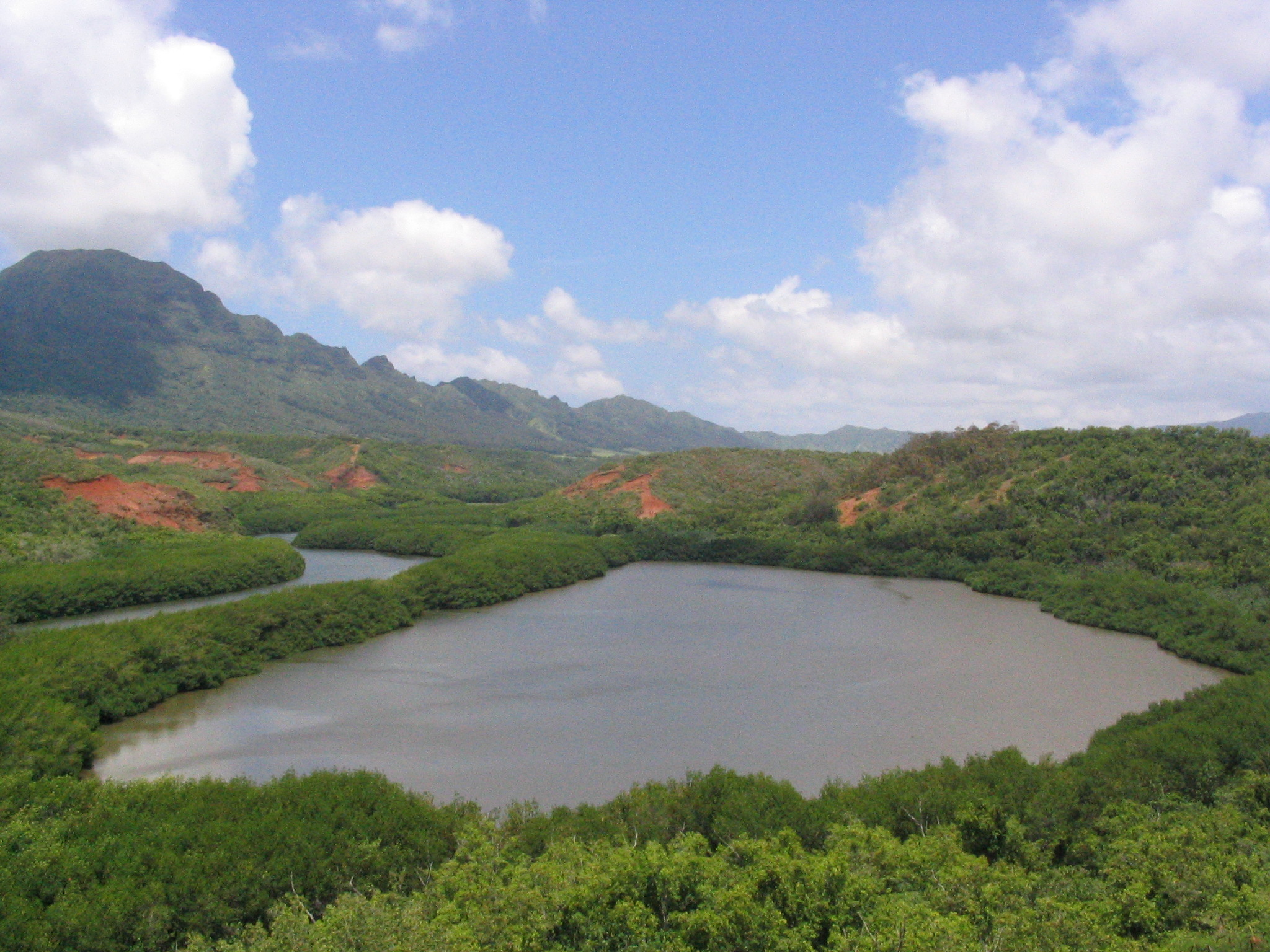
Alekoko "Menehune" fishpond

Before contact with Europeans, the Hawaiian people practiced aquaculture through development of fish ponds (Hawaiian: loko iʻa), the most advanced fish-husbandry among the original peoples of the Pacific. While other cultures in places like Egypt and China also used the practice, Hawaii's aquaculture was very advanced considering the much smaller size of the area of Hawaii compared to other aquacultural societies. Hawaiian fishponds were typically shallow areas of a reef flat surrounded by a low lava rock wall (loko kuapa) built out from the shore. Several species of edible fish (such as mullet) thrive in such ponds, and Hawaiians developed methods to make them easy to catch.

"The full-scale development of loko i‘a (fishponds) from mauka (the mountains) to makai (the ocean) dates back over half a millennium. Cultivation and propagation centered on many different fresh and salt-water plants and animals, with the primary species being the prized ‘ama‘ama (mullet) and ‘awa (milkfish). An inventory in the early 1900s found 360 loko i‘a in the islands and identified 99 active ponds with an estimated annual production total of about 680,000 pounds, including 486,000 pounds of ‘ama‘ama and 194,000 pounds of ‘awa. Loko i‘a were extensive operating systems that produced an average of 400–600 pounds per acre per year, a significant amount considering the minimal amount of fishpond 'input' and maintenance effort apparent by that time."

— "A Manual on Hawaiian Fishpond Restoration and Management" CTAHR University of Hawai'i

The Hawaiian fishpond was primarily a grazing area in which the fishpond-keeper cultivated algae; much in the way cattle ranchers cultivate grass for their cattle. The porous lava walls let in seawater (or sometimes fresh or brackish water, as in the case of the "Menehune" fishpond near Līhuʻe, Kauaʻi), but prevent the fish from escaping. Fishponds were located next to the mouth of a stream, so by opening a sluice gate the pondkeeper provided the fish with water rich in nutrients that had passed through inland, terraced pondfields and returned to the stream. At the time of Captain James Cook's arrival, there were at least 360 fishponds producing 2,000,000 pounds (900,000 kg) of fish per year.

== Types of fishponds ==
There were four basic types of fishponds developed within the Ahupua'a known in ancient Hawaii. The four types of fishponds were freshwater taro fishponds (loko i'a kalo), other freshwater ponds (loko wai), brackish water ponds (loko pu'unone), and seawater ponds (loko kuapa).

Taro fishponds (loko i'a kalo) were usually seen inland and were used to cultivate taro as well as fish, such as mullet, silver perch, Hawaiian gobies, freshwater prawn, and green algae. Taro fish ponds were usually located close to the sea and contained surplus of fish. Fish were also able to directly enter the taro patch-fishponds from the sea through newly created artificial estuary. Fish in these ponds thrived and were able to survive the transition from seawater to freshwater. They also helped the taro in these ponds by feeding on insects and ripe leaf stems of taro. The taro would help prevent silt by catching it before it would go downstream into the ocean. Planting between the wetland areas would also help provide green manure, medicines and other products.

Loko wai are other freshwater ponds that are seen inland and usually were excavated by hand from natural depressions like lakes or ponds and were supplied from naturally created water supplies (i.e., streams, rivers, springs, etc.). These ponds contained native species of freshwater prawn and fishes that migrate from the sea and into freshwater (i.e., mullet, milkfish. etc.). Fishes in these ponds were often harvested when spawning fish moved seaward, usually during full moons in the spring.

Brackish water ponds (loko pu'unone) were seen very close to the ocean and excavated by hand from natural bodies of water that have been stranded by sea-level change, or by creating an earth embankment with mud, sand, and coral. This made a wall that separated the pond from the ocean. However, these ponds were still connected to the ocean via small canals which would allow seawater fish to enter the fishpond during the rising tide. These brackish-water ponds were very productive and were filled with many different types of species.

According to B.A. Costa-Pierce, seawater ponds were the "ultimate aquaculture achievement of native Hawaiians and a valuable contribution to native engineering and subsistence food production." These ponds were constructed by a seawall, usually made of coral or lava rocks, with lengths of these walls ranging from 46 to 1,920 meters (151 to 6,299 ft). Coralline algae was gathered and used as a natural cement to hold and strengthen the walls. These ponds were very diverse, usually containing about 22 species of marine life. One of the most important features of these ponds were the canals which were connected directly to the sea and had a grate made of wood and ferns that sat in the middle of these canals. These innovative grates allowed for very small fish to enter the pond and prevented bigger and mature fish from leaving. Harvesting timing and methods were usually determined by the behavior of the fish. For example, during migration seasons for fishes such as milkfish and mullet that migrate to the ocean to spawn, keepers of the fishpond would set out nets on the pond side of the grates and watch as the fishes trapped themselves as they tried to reach the sea.

== Restoration ==
Several fishponds have been restored in recent years. Although fishponds were developed on most islands, the largest number were found in Keʻehi Lagoon, Pearl Harbor, Maunalua Bay (known as the largest on Oʻahu prior to it being filled for housing development), and Kāneʻohe Bay on Oʻahu, and along nearly the entire south shore of Molokaʻi. Few remain today, although Molokaʻi offers the best opportunities to view a Hawaiian loko.

Three different styles of fish ponds are being reconstructed at the Kaloko-Honokōhau National Historical Park on the Big Island of Hawaiʻi. The non-profit ʻAoʻao O Na Loko Iʻa O Maui is restoring Kalepolepo Fishpond also known as Koʻieʻ - i.e. in Kīhei on Maui - using a mixture of volunteers and skilled stonemasons. On Oʻahu, the private non-profit organization Paepae o Heʻeia ("Threshold of Heʻeia") is rehabilitating the roughly 600-to–800-year-old Heʻeia Fishpond, which is a walled (kuapa-style) enclosure in Heʻeia covering 88 acres (36 ha) of brackish water. The Kāneiolouma Complex, an ancient village on the south shore of the island of Kauaʻi, has a fishpond within the 13-acre archaeological site (5.3 ha) that includes taro patches, heiau, and a makahiki sporting arena.

These fishponds have been found to increase overall fish stocks in nearby waters, serving as a nursery that protects fish from predators.

== See also ==
- Clam garden
- Fish farming
- Stew pond
