= National Register of Historic Places listings in Oʻahu =

Location of Oʻahu

This is a list of properties and districts on the Hawaiian island of Oʻahu that are listed on the National Register of Historic Places. Oahu is the only major island in Honolulu County. The location of the city of Honolulu, Oʻahu is the most populous island in the state. There are 171 properties and districts on the island, including 16 National Historic Landmarks. Five formerly listed sites were demolished and have been removed from the Register.

== Current listings ==
	Name on the Register	Image	Date listed	Location	Community	Description
1	Ala Wai Villas	Ala Wai Villas	August 15, 2019 (#100004290)	2455 Ala Wai Blvd. 21°16′40″N 157°49′17″W	Honolulu	
2	Alexander and Baldwin Building	Alexander and Baldwin Building	September 7, 1979 (#79000755)	822 Bishop St. 21°18′29″N 157°51′45″W	Honolulu	
3	Aliʻiōlani Hale	Aliʻiōlani Hale	February 2, 1972 (#72000414)	417 S King St. 21°18′19″N 157°51′36″W	Honolulu	
4	Aloha Tower	Aloha Tower	May 13, 1976 (#76000660)	Pier 9 in Honolulu Harbor; 21°18′25″N 157°51′58″W	Honolulu	
5	Barbers Point Light	Barbers Point Light	March 26, 2024 (#100010117)	Southwest end of Olai Street, 0.1 mile west of Barbers Point Beach Park; 21°15′25″N 157°48′10″W	Kapolei vicinity	
6	Mr. and Mrs. David Barry Jr. House	Mr. and Mrs. David Barry Jr. House	January 12, 2017 (#100000481)	3625 Diamond Head Road; 21°15′25″N 157°48′10″W	Honolulu	
7	Battery Hasbrouck	Battery Hasbrouck	June 5, 1984 (#84000925)	Fort Kamehameha; 21°19′30″N 157°57′40″W	Honolulu	Site of coastal artillery in Fort Kamehameha
8	Battery Hawkins	Battery Hawkins	June 5, 1984 (#84000928)	440 Nelson Avenue; 21°19′N 157°58′W	Honolulu	Site of coastal artillery in Fort Kamehameha
9	Battery Hawkins Annex	Battery Hawkins Annex	June 5, 1984 (#84000948)	Fort Kamehameha; 21°19′N 157°58′W	Honolulu	Site of bunker in Fort Kamehameha
10	Battery Jackson		June 5, 1984 (#84000954)	Fort Kamehameha; 21°19′06″N 157°57′22″W	Honolulu	Site of coastal artillery in Fort Kamehameha
11	Battery Randolph	Battery Randolph	June 5, 1984 (#84000971)	32 Kalia Road; 21°16′58″N 157°50′11″W	Honolulu	Site of coastal artillery in Fort DeRussy, now a museum
12	Battery Selfridge		June 5, 1984 (#84000975)	Fort Kamehameha; 21°19′05″N 157°57′09″W	Honolulu	Site of coastal artillery in Fort Kamehameha
13	Bellows Field Archeological Area		August 14, 1973 (#73002278)	Address Restricted	Waimanalo	
14	Bernice P. Bishop Museum	Bernice P. Bishop Museum	July 26, 1982 (#82002500)	1355 Kalihi St. 21°20′00″N 157°52′16″W	Honolulu	
15	Boettcher Estate	Boettcher Estate	April 26, 2002 (#02000388)	248 North Kalaheo; 21°24′16″N 157°44′23″W	Kailua	built 1937, architect Vladimir Ossipoff
16	The Bowers' House		April 4, 2024 (#100010159)	4837 Sierra Drive; 21°17′48″N 157°47′17″W	Honolulu	
17	C. Brewer Building	C. Brewer Building	April 2, 1980 (#80001272)	827 Fort St. 21°18′30″N 157°51′47″W	Honolulu	
18	Burial Platform		August 14, 1973 (#73000670)	Address Restricted	Kahuku	
19	Thomas Alexander Burningham House	Thomas Alexander Burningham House	October 13, 1993 (#93001029)	2849 Pali Highway; 21°20′07″N 157°50′25″W	Honolulu	
20	Bushnell House	Bushnell House	July 17, 2017 (#100000483)	3210 Melemele Pl. 21°19′02″N 157°47′45″W	Honolulu	
21	Georges de S. Canavarro House	Georges de S. Canavarro House	May 28, 1980 (#80001274)	2756 Rooke Ave. 21°20′16″N 157°50′46″W	Honolulu	Now a Korean Cultural Center
22	Lloyd Case House	Lloyd Case House	June 5, 1987 (#86002829)	3581 Woodlawn Dr. 21°19′07″N 157°47′52″W	Honolulu	
23	Central Fire Station	Central Fire Station	December 2, 1980 (#80001273)	104 S. Beretania St. 21°18′40″N 157°51′32″W	Honolulu	renovated 1934, architects Dickey & Young
24	Central Intermediate School	Central Intermediate School	February 11, 2004 (#03001049)	1302 Queen Emma St. 21°18′41″N 157°51′24″W	Honolulu	
25	Jean Charlot House	Jean Charlot House	November 30, 2000 (#00001371)	Address Restricted	Honolulu	
26	Chinatown Historic District	Chinatown Historic District	January 17, 1973 (#73000658)	Bounded roughly by Beretania St. on the northeast, Nuuanu Stream on the north, Nuuanu Ave. on the southeast, and Honolulu Harbor; 21°18′43″N 157°51′46″W	Honolulu	
27	Church of the Crossroads	Church of the Crossroads	November 20, 1992 (#92001551)	1212 University Ave. 21°17′39″N 157°49′19″W	Honolulu	
28	CINCPAC Headquarters	CINCPAC Headquarters	May 28, 1987 (#87001295)	Pearl Harbor Naval Base; 21°22′03″N 157°56′18″W	Pearl Harbor	
29	James L. Coke House	James L. Coke House	August 20, 1986 (#86001618)	3649 Nuuanu Pali Dr. 21°20′37″N 157°49′43″W	Honolulu	Also called Waipuna, built 1934, architects Richard Tongg and C.W. Dickey
30	Grace Cooke House	Grace Cooke House	October 24, 1983 (#83003556)	2365 Oahu Ave. 21°18′21″N 157°49′07″W	Honolulu	Bungalow style built in 1912
31	Charles Montague Cooke Jr. House and Kuka'o'o Heiau	Charles Montague Cooke Jr. House and Kuka'o'o Heiau	October 31, 1985 (#85003402)	2859 Manoa Rd. 21°18′44″N 157°48′52″W	Honolulu	Grand Tudor Revival residence built in 1912 by architects Emory & Webb
32	Clarence H. Cooke House	Clarence H. Cooke House	August 20, 1986 (#86001619)	3860 Old Pali Rd. 21°20′53″N 157°49′33″W	Honolulu	
33	Bartlett Cooper House	Bartlett Cooper House	June 5, 1987 (#86002833)	4850 Kahala Ave. 21°16′11″N 157°46′45″W	Honolulu	
34	Cooper Apartments	Cooper Apartments	August 7, 2017 (#100001417)	413 Seaside Ave. 21°16′50″N 157°49′36″W	Honolulu	
35	Dearborn Chemical Company Warehouse	Dearborn Chemical Company Warehouse	August 19, 2019 (#100004287)	941 Waimanu St. 21°17′53″N 157°51′10″W	Honolulu	
36	C.W. Dickey House	C.W. Dickey House	November 1, 1984 (#84000201)	3030 Kalakaua Ave. 21°15′32″N 157°49′07″W	Honolulu	
37	Dilks Property	Dilks Property	May 17, 2016 (#16000272)	1302 Mokulua Dr. 21°23′11″N 157°42′42″W	Kailua	
38	Dillingham Transportation Building	Dillingham Transportation Building	September 7, 1979 (#79000756)	735 Bishop St. 21°18′26″N 157°51′47″W	Honolulu	
39	James D. Dole Homestead	James D. Dole Homestead	June 23, 1978 (#78001024)	Waipahu Cultural Garden; 21°23′07″N 158°00′43″W	Waipahu	1901 house of Pineapple planter
40	Carl H. Duhrsen House	Carl H. Duhrsen House	June 5, 1987 (#86002834)	3029 Felix St. 21°17′46″N 157°48′26″W	Honolulu	
41	Ewa Plain Battlefield		May 23, 2016 (#16000273)	Roosevelt Avenue, approximately 5.5 miles (8.9 km) southwest of Ford Island; 21°19′38″N 158°02′41″W	Kapolei vicinity	
42	Jessie Eyman–Wilma Judson House	Jessie Eyman–Wilma Judson House	August 20, 1986 (#86001621)	3114 Paty Dr. 21°18′36″N 157°48′03″W	Honolulu	built 1926, architect C.W. Dickey
43	Joseph and Joan Farrell Residence		May 6, 2025 (#100011803)	3196 Diamond Head Road; 21°15′24″N 157°48′52″W	Honolulu	
44	Dr. Robert Faus House	Dr. Robert Faus House	June 5, 1987 (#86002828)	2311 Ferdinand Ave. 21°18′26″N 157°49′26″W	Honolulu	
45	Fort Ruger Historic District	Fort Ruger Historic District	July 14, 1983 (#83000249)	Diamond Head Rd. 21°16′03″N 157°48′31″W	Honolulu	
46	Foster Botanical Garden	Foster Botanical Garden	May 13, 1993 (#93000377)	50 N. Vineyard Boulevard; 21°18′58″N 157°51′28″W	Honolulu	
47	Friendship Garden	Friendship Garden	June 7, 2016 (#15000885)	45-219 Kokokahi Pl. 21°24′17″N 157°46′37″W	Kaneohe	
48	J. B. Guard House		November 23, 2015 (#15000847)	305A Portlock Rd. 21°16′33″N 157°42′31″W	Honolulu	
49	John Guild House	John Guild House	August 1, 1980 (#80001275)	2001 Vancouver Dr. 21°18′03″N 157°49′21″W	Honolulu	
50	Hawaii Capital Historic District	Hawaii Capital Historic District	December 1, 1978 (#78001020)	Beretania, Richards, King, Queen, Punchbowl, and Kawaiahao Sts. 21°18′26″N 157°51′29″W	Honolulu	
51	Hawaii Shingon Mission	Hawaii Shingon Mission	April 26, 2002 (#02000386)	915 Sheridan St. 21°17′52″N 157°50′27″W	Honolulu	
52	Hawaii Theatre	Hawaii Theatre	November 14, 1978 (#78001021)	1130 Bethel St. 21°18′40″N 157°51′40″W	Honolulu	
53	Heʻeia Fishpond	Heʻeia Fishpond	January 17, 1973 (#73000671)	Address Restricted	Kaneohe	
54	Edgar and Lucy Henriques House	Edgar and Lucy Henriques House	November 1, 1984 (#84000202)	20 Old Pali Pl. 21°20′48″N 157°49′36″W	Honolulu	
55	Hickam Field	Hickam Field	September 16, 1985 (#85002725)	Southeast of Pearl Harbor Naval Base; 21°20′07″N 157°56′54″W	Honolulu	
56	Alfred Hocking House	Alfred Hocking House	November 15, 1984 (#84000246)	1302 Nehoa St. 21°18′32″N 157°50′05″W	Honolulu	Built 1903, designed by E.A.P. Newcomb and C.W. Dickey in Queen Anne style architecture
57	Lemon Wond Holt House	Lemon Wond Holt House	May 24, 2006 (#06000422)	3704 Anuhea St. 21°17′11″N 157°47′42″W	Honolulu	
58	Honouliuli Internment Camp	Honouliuli Internment Camp	February 21, 2012 (#09000855)	Address Restricted	Waipahu vicinity	
59	Honolulu Academy of Arts	Honolulu Academy of Arts	March 25, 1972 (#72000415)	900 S. Beretania St. 21°18′15″N 157°50′55″W	Honolulu	
60	House at 3023 Kalakaua Avenue	House at 3023 Kalakaua Avenue	June 5, 1987 (#86002820)	3023 Kalakaua Ave. 21°15′33″N 157°49′08″W	Honolulu	Built 1932 by Earl Williams
61	House at 3023A Kalakaua Avenue	House at 3023A Kalakaua Avenue	June 5, 1987 (#86002821)	3023A Kalakaua Ave. 21°15′33″N 157°49′09″W	Honolulu	Built 1932 by Earl Williams
62	House at 3023B Kalakaua Avenue	House at 3023B Kalakaua Avenue	June 5, 1987 (#86002822)	3023B Kalakaua Ave. 21°15′33″N 157°49′09″W	Honolulu	Built 1932 by Earl Williams
63	House at 3027 Kalakaua Avenue	House at 3027 Kalakaua Avenue	June 5, 1987 (#86002826)	3027 Kalakaua Ave. 21°15′32″N 157°49′08″W	Honolulu	Built 1932 by Earl Williams
64	House at 3033 Kalakaua Avenue	House at 3033 Kalakaua Avenue	June 5, 1987 (#86002827)	3033 Kalakaua Ave. 21°15′32″N 157°49′09″W	Honolulu	Built 1932 by Earl Williams
65	House at 3033B Kalakaua Avenue	House at 3033B Kalakaua Avenue	June 5, 1987 (#86002825)	3033B Kalakaua Ave. 21°15′32″N 157°49′09″W	Honolulu	Built 1932 by Earl Williams
66	House at 4109 Black Point Road		June 5, 1987 (#86002836)	4109 Black Point Rd. 21°15′28″N 157°47′31″W	Honolulu	
67	Huilua Fishpond	Huilua Fishpond	October 15, 1966 (#66000295)	In Kahana Bay, 13 miles north of Kaneohe on Hawaii Route 83 adjacent to Ahupuaʻa O Kahana State Park; 21°33′28″N 157°52′06″W	Kaneohe	
68	Iolani Palace	Iolani Palace	October 15, 1966 (#66000293)	364 S. King St. 21°18′24″N 157°51′32″W	Honolulu	
69	Kahaluu Fish Pond	Kahaluu Fish Pond	March 14, 1973 (#73000668)	Northwest of Laenani St. off Kamehameha Highway; 21°27′34″N 157°50′10″W	Kahaluu	Private property
70	Kahaluu Taro Lo'i	Kahaluu Taro Lo'i	March 14, 1973 (#73000669)	West of the western end of Hui Kelu St. 21°25′57″N 157°50′36″W	Kahaluu	Camouflaged trail access beside Ahuimanu Stream between Heno Pl. and Lile Pl. on mountain side of Hui Kelu St.
71	Kahuku Habitation Area		September 11, 1972 (#72000424)	Address Restricted	Kahuku	
72	Kaimuki Fire Station	Kaimuki Fire Station	December 2, 1980 (#80001276)	971 Koko Head Ave. 21°16′42″N 157°47′58″W	Honolulu	built 1924, architect G. Robert Miller
73	Henry J. and Alyce Kaiser Estate		August 16, 2019 (#100004289)	525 Portlock Rd. 21°16′06″N 157°42′29″W	Honolulu	
74	Kakaako Fire Station	Kakaako Fire Station	December 2, 1980 (#80001277)	620 South St. 21°18′09″N 157°51′34″W	Honolulu	built 1929, architect Solomon F. Kenn
75	Kakaako Pumping Station	Kakaako Pumping Station	October 4, 1978 (#78001022)	653 Ala Moana Boulevard; 21°17′54″N 157°51′46″W	Honolulu	
76	Kalihi Fire Station	Kalihi Fire Station	December 2, 1980 (#80001278)	1742 N. King St. 21°19′53″N 157°52′33″W	Honolulu	built 1924, architect G. Robert Miller
77	Kamehameha V Post Office	Kamehameha V Post Office	May 5, 1972 (#72000416)	Corner of Merchant and Bethel Sts. 21°18′35″N 157°51′47″W	Honolulu	
78	Kaneohe Naval Air Station	Kaneohe Naval Air Station	May 28, 1987 (#87001299)	Area between 1st St. and Kāne'ohe Bay; 21°26′45″N 157°46′11″W	Kailua	
79	Kaneohe Ranch Building	Kaneohe Ranch Building	June 5, 1987 (#87001150)	Castle junction 21°22′30″N 157°46′49″W	Kailua	
80	Kaniakapupu	Kaniakapupu	October 15, 1986 (#86002805)	Address Restricted	Nuuanu	Ruins of the summer palace of King Kamehameha III
81	Kapapa Island Complex		August 21, 1972 (#72000430)	Address Restricted	Kapapa Island	
82	Kapuaiwa Building	Kapuaiwa Building	July 2, 1973 (#73000660)	426 Queen St. 21°18′17″N 157°51′36″W	Honolulu	Built 1884, architect George Lucas
83	Kaumakapili Church	Kaumakapili Church	May 5, 2008 (#08000372)	766 N. King St. 21°19′18″N 157°51′59″W	Honolulu	
84	Kawaewae Heiau	Kawaewae Heiau	August 21, 1972 (#72000427)	On hill above dead end of Lipalu Street; 21°23′43″N 157°47′08″W	Kaneohe	
85	Kawaiahao Church and Mission Houses	Kawaiahao Church and Mission Houses	October 15, 1966 (#66000294)	957 Punchbowl St., 553 S. King St. 21°18′16″N 157°51′28″W	Honolulu	
86	Kawailoa Ryusenji Temple	Kawailoa Ryusenji Temple	November 21, 1978 (#78001019)	North of Haleiwa at 179-A Kawailoa Dr. 21°36′37″N 158°05′02″W	Haleiwa	Demolished. Congregation and some religious symbols relocated to Wahiawa Ryūsenji Sōtō Mission.
87	Kea'au Talus Sites Archeological District		May 4, 1987 (#86002808)	Address Restricted	Waianae	
88	Keaiwa Heiau	Keaiwa Heiau	November 9, 1972 (#72000413)	At top of Aiea Heights Dr. 21°24′01″N 157°54′26″W	Aiea	Temple site with many plants used for healing
89	John and Kate Kelly House	John and Kate Kelly House	August 27, 1991 (#91001085)	4117 Blackpoint Rd. 21°15′23″N 157°47′32″W	Honolulu	
90	King Residence		March 19, 2026 (#100012829)	3218 Melemele Place; 21°19′00″N 157°47′46″W	Honolulu	
91	Kualoa Ahupua'a Historical District	Kualoa Ahupua'a Historical District	October 16, 1974 (#74000718)	Kamehameha Highway; 21°31′29″N 157°50′39″W	Kaneohe	
92	Kukaniloko Birth Site	Kukaniloko Birth Site	April 11, 1973 (#73000674)	At corner of Kamehameha Highway and Whitmore Ave. 21°30′17″N 158°02′10″W	Wahiawa	
93	Kukuipilau Heiau		November 16, 1984 (#84000254)	On grounds of Hawaiʻi Youth Correctional Facility off Kalanianaʻole Highway; 21°22′36″N 157°44′56″W	Kailua	In gulch below buildings of Hawaiʻi Youth Correctional Facility
94	Kunia Camp		December 1, 2014 (#14000970)	Roughly bounded by Kunia & Pu'u Drives; 21°27′44″N 158°03′33″W	Kunia	
95	Kupopolo Heiau		June 4, 1973 (#73000657)	Address Restricted	Haleiwa	
96	Kyoto Gardens of Honolulu Memorial Park	Kyoto Gardens of Honolulu Memorial Park	February 11, 2004 (#04000020)	22 Craigside Place; 21°19′21″N 157°50′51″W	Honolulu	
97	Leleahina Heiau		March 20, 1973 (#73000672)	South of Haiku Plantation Dr. 21°25′28″N 157°49′37″W	Kaneohe	
98	Lihiwai	Lihiwai	July 26, 1982 (#82002501)	51 Kepola Pl.; also 41C Kepola Pl. 21°20′29″N 157°49′54″W	Honolulu	41C Kepola represents a boundary increase of 0
99	Liljestrand House	Liljestrand House	March 26, 2008 (#08000207)	3300 Tantalus Dr. 21°19′27″N 157°49′52″W	Honolulu	built 1952, architect Vladimir Ossipoff, featured in House Beautiful magazine as a Pace Setter House in 1958.
100	Linekona School	Linekona School	May 28, 1980 (#80001279)	Victoria and Beretania Sts. 21°18′10″N 157°50′52″W	Honolulu	
101	R.N. Linn House	R.N. Linn House	August 20, 1986 (#86001622)	2013 Kakela Dr. 21°18′13″N 157°49′29″W	Honolulu	
102	Little Makalapa Naval Housing Historic District	Little Makalapa Naval Housing Historic District	May 5, 2017 (#100000731)	Palmyra St. & Tarawa Dr. 21°21′06″N 157°56′04″W	Honolulu	
103	Makalapa Naval Housing Historic District		May 5, 2017 (#100000732)	Roughly bounded by HI1, Kamehameha Hwy., Radford & Makalapa Drs. 21°21′19″N 157°56′04″W	Honolulu	
104	Makiki Fire Station	Makiki Fire Station	December 2, 1980 (#80001280)	1202 Wilder Ave. 21°18′24″N 157°50′21″W	Honolulu	built 1929, architect Solomon F. Kenn
105	MALIA (Hawaiian canoe)	MALIA (Hawaiian canoe)	December 17, 1993 (#93001385)	Southeastern corner of the junction of Kapiolani Boulevard and McCully St. 21°17′18″N 157°49′54″W	Honolulu	Wooden dugout-style Hawaiian canoe built in 1933 by James Takeo Yamasaki
106	Marconi Wireless Telegraphy Station	Marconi Wireless Telegraphy Station	June 4, 2013 (#13000352)	56-1095 Kamehameha Hwy. 21°42′26″N 157°58′23″W	Kahuku	
107	Marigold Building	Marigold Building	August 18, 1983 (#83000250)	94-837 Waipahu St. 21°23′07″N 158°00′29″W	Waipahu	Original building https://npgallery.nps.gov/NRHP/GetAsset/NRHP/83000250_photos replaced by Leeward Oahu Pharmacy
108	McKinley High School	McKinley High School	August 11, 1980 (#80001281)	1039 S. King St. 21°17′57″N 157°50′54″W	Honolulu	Designed by Louis Davis
109	J.P. Mendonca House	J.P. Mendonca House	October 7, 1986 (#86002798)	1942 Judd Hillside Rd. 21°18′25″N 157°49′33″W	Honolulu	
110	Merchant Street Historic District	Merchant Street Historic District	June 19, 1973 (#73000661)	Along Merchant St. from Nuuanu Ave. through Fort St. 21°18′35″N 157°51′48″W	Honolulu	
111	Moana Hotel	Moana Hotel	August 7, 1972 (#72000417)	2365 Kalakaua Ave. 21°16′36″N 157°49′36″W	Honolulu	
112	Moiliʻili Japanese Cemetery	Moiliʻili Japanese Cemetery	April 7, 2015 (#15000128)	2624 Kapiolani Boulevard; 21°17′18″N 157°49′14″W	Honolulu	
113	Mokapu Burial Area		November 15, 1972 (#72000428)	Address Restricted	Kaneohe	
114	Molii Fishpond	Molii Fishpond	December 5, 1972 (#72000429)	Southeast of Kamehameha Highway between Kualoa and Johnson Rds. 21°30′35″N 157°50′46″W	Kaneohe	
115	National Memorial Cemetery of the Pacific	National Memorial Cemetery of the Pacific	January 11, 1976 (#76002276)	2177 Puowaina Dr. 21°18′46″N 157°50′46″W	Honolulu	
116	Naval Aviation Supply Depot Personnel Camp Quonset Hut 33		February 10, 2023 (#100008051)	955 Kamehameha Hwy. (TMK 9-7-023:0); 21°23′36″N 157°58′26″W	Pearl City	
117	Nuuanu Petroglyph Complex		March 14, 1973 (#73000662)	Address Restricted	Honolulu	
118	Oahu Railway and Land Company Right-of-Way	Oahu Railway and Land Company Right-of-Way	December 1, 1975 (#75000621)	Barbers Point; 21°20′49″N 158°01′38″W	Nanakuli	also see Oahu Railway and Land Company
119	George D. Oakley House	George D. Oakley House	November 15, 1984 (#84000249)	2110 Kakela Pl. 21°18′17″N 157°49′29″W	Honolulu	Tudor cottage
120	Frederick Ohrt House	Frederick Ohrt House	June 5, 1987 (#86002835)	2958 Pali Highway; 21°20′13″N 157°50′21″W	Honolulu	
121	Okiokilepe Pond	Okiokilepe Pond	March 14, 1973 (#73000673)	0.3 miles northwest of Iroquois Point at the entrance to Pearl Harbor; 21°20′21″N 157°58′32″W	Pearl Harbor	
122	Opana Radar Site	Opana Radar Site	September 19, 1991 (#91001379)	Off Kamehameha Highway, south of Kawela Bay; 21°41′08″N 158°00′35″W	Kawela Bay	
123	Our Lady of Peace Cathedral	Our Lady of Peace Cathedral	August 7, 1972 (#72000418)	1183 Bishop St. 21°18′39″N 157°51′34″W	Honolulu	
124	Pahukini Heiau	Pahukini Heiau	September 11, 1972 (#72000426)	Southwest of Kapaa Quarry; 21°23′41″N 157°46′11″W	Kailua	
125	Palama Fire Station	Palama Fire Station	April 21, 1976 (#76000661)	879 N. King St. 21°19′21″N 157°52′04″W	Honolulu	built 1901, architect Oliver G. Traphagen
126	Palm Circle Historic District	Palm Circle Historic District	October 26, 1984 (#84000104)	Roughly bounded by Carter Dr., Richardson and Funston Rds., and A and B Sts. 21°20′44″N 157°53′17″W	Honolulu	
127	Pearl Harbor, US Naval Base	Pearl Harbor, US Naval Base	October 15, 1966 (#66000940)	3 miles south of Pearl City on Hawaii Route 73; 21°21′09″N 157°57′20″W	Pearl City	
128	Joseph W. Podmore Building	Joseph W. Podmore Building	March 24, 1983 (#83000251)	202-206 Merchant St. 21°18′27″N 157°51′41″W	Honolulu	built 1902, architect Lee Wai
129	Pohaku ka luahine		July 23, 1973 (#73002273)	Address Restricted	Kaneohe	
130	Punahou School Campus	Punahou School Campus	August 7, 1972 (#72000419)	1601 Punahou St. 21°18′14″N 157°49′49″W	Honolulu	
131	Puu o Mahuka Heiau	Puu o Mahuka Heiau	October 15, 1966 (#66000292)	4 miles northeast of Haleiwa on Hawaii Route 83, overlooking Waimea Bay; 21°38′29″N 158°03′33″W	Haleiwa	
132	Queen Emma's Summer Home	Queen Emma's Summer Home	August 7, 1972 (#72000420)	2913 Pali Highway; 21°20′09″N 157°50′21″W	Honolulu	
133	Royal Brewery	Royal Brewery	November 29, 1972 (#72000421)	553 S. Queen St. 21°18′11″N 157°51′33″W	Honolulu	
134	Royal Mausoleum	Royal Mausoleum	August 7, 1972 (#72000422)	2261 Nuuanu Ave. 21°19′30″N 157°50′50″W	Honolulu	burial site of royal family known as Mauna ʻAla bilt in 1863
135	Sacred Heart Church	Sacred Heart Church	February 6, 2001 (#89001875)	1701 Wilder Ave. 21°18′06″N 157°49′52″W	Honolulu	
136	Salvation Army Waioli Tea Room	Salvation Army Waioli Tea Room	October 30, 1998 (#98001288)	3016 Oahu Ave. 21°18′58″N 157°48′47″W	Honolulu	built 1926, architects Emory & Webb, founded as a girls home and bakery
137	Schofield Barracks Historic District		July 31, 1998 (#98000889)	Roughly bounded by Foote Ave., Wright Ave., McMahon Rd., and Wright-Smith Rd. 21°29′52″N 158°03′30″W	Schofield Barracks	
138	Schofield Barracks Stockade		August 24, 1998 (#98000974)	Lyman Rd. 21°29′12″N 158°03′19″W	Schofield Barracks	
139	J. Alvin Shadinger House	J. Alvin Shadinger House	June 5, 1987 (#86002832)	4584 Kahala Ave. 21°15′50″N 157°47′05″W	Honolulu	also known as The Gingerbread House
140	Charles A. Simpson House	Charles A. Simpson House	June 5, 1987 (#86002831)	4354 Kahala Ave. 21°15′38″N 157°47′31″W	Honolulu	
141	Dr. Archibald Neil Sinclair House	Dr. Archibald Neil Sinclair House	October 13, 1983 (#83003557)	2726 Hillside Ave. 21°18′36″N 157°48′58″W	Honolulu	built 1917, architects Emory & Webb, Colonial Revival style
142	Small Heiau		March 14, 1973 (#73000667)	1 mile south of Kaaawa off Kaaawa Valley Rd. 21°32′32″N 157°51′21″W	Kaaawa	
143	Mabel Smyth Memorial Building	Mabel Smyth Memorial Building	February 3, 1994 (#93001558)	510 South Beretania St. 21°18′25″N 157°51′19″W	Honolulu	built 1941, architect C.W. Dickey, renovated 1999
144	St. Andrew's Cathedral	St. Andrew's Cathedral	July 2, 1973 (#73000663)	Beretania St. (Queen Emma Sq.); 21°18′35″N 157°51′26″W	Honolulu	
145	Tantalus-Round Top Road	Tantalus-Round Top Road	August 14, 2009 (#08000373)	Tantalus Dr., Round Top Dr. 21°19′48″N 157°48′51″W	Honolulu	
146	Frank Tavares House	Frank Tavares House	June 5, 1987 (#86002830)	2826 Coconut Ave. 21°15′31″N 157°49′04″W	Honolulu	
147	Thomas Square	Thomas Square	April 25, 1972 (#72000423)	Bounded by King, S. Beretania, and Victoria Sts. and Ward Ave. 21°18′10″N 157°50′57″W	Honolulu	
148	US Coast Guard Diamond Head Lighthouse	US Coast Guard Diamond Head Lighthouse	October 31, 1980 (#80001282)	3399 Diamond Head Rd. 21°15′20″N 157°48′34″W	Honolulu	
149	US Coast Guard Makapuu Point Light	US Coast Guard Makapuu Point Light	December 7, 1977 (#77000447)	Southeast of Waimanalo off the Kalanianaole Highway; 21°18′35″N 157°38′59″W	Waimanalo	
150	US Immigration Office	US Immigration Office	August 14, 1973 (#73000664)	595 Ala Moana Boulevard; 21°17′59″N 157°51′50″W	Honolulu	
151	US Post Office, Customhouse, and Courthouse	US Post Office, Customhouse, and Courthouse	January 27, 1975 (#75000620)	335 Merchant St. 21°18′22″N 157°51′38″W	Honolulu	
152	Ukanipo Heiau		August 13, 1982 (#82002502)	Address Restricted	Makaha	
153	Ulu Po Heiau	Ulu Po Heiau	November 9, 1972 (#72000425)	Off Route 61 northeast of the Castle Medical Center; 21°23′08″N 157°45′10″W	Kailua	
154	USS Arizona Memorial	USS Arizona Memorial	October 15, 1966 (#66000944)	3 miles south of Pearl City on Hawaii Route 73; 21°21′53″N 157°57′00″W	Pearl City	
155	USS Arizona Wreck	USS Arizona Wreck	May 5, 1989 (#89001083)	Off Ford Island in Pearl Harbor; 21°21′53″N 157°57′01″W	Pearl City	
156	USS Bowfin	USS Bowfin	November 16, 1982 (#82000149)	11 Arizona Memorial Dr. 21°22′07″N 157°56′22″W	Honolulu	a submarine
157	USS Missouri	USS Missouri	May 14, 1971 (#71000877)	63 Cowpens St. 21°21′43″N 157°57′13″W	Honolulu	Moved from Bremerton, Washington and opened as a museum ship in 1999
158	USS Utah Wreck	USS Utah Wreck	May 5, 1989 (#89001084)	Off Ford Island in Pearl Harbor; 21°22′08″N 157°57′45″W	Honolulu	
159	Ernest Shelton Van Tassel House	Ernest Shelton Van Tassel House	December 16, 1981 (#81000203)	3280 Round Top Dr. 21°18′54″N 157°49′15″W	Honolulu	Former macadamia nut plantation, also called Nutridge, built 1922, architect Hart Wood
160	Waialua Agricultural Company Engine No. 6		August 19, 1974 (#74000719)	Off Hawaii Route 78; 21°19′56″N 158°02′47″W	Lualualei	Now at the Hawaiian Railway Society.
161	Waialua Fire Station	Waialua Fire Station	December 2, 1980 (#80001270)	66-420 Haleiwa Rd. 21°35′12″N 158°06′43″W	Haleiwa	built 1932, architect A.W. Heen
162	Waialua School	Waialua School	August 11, 1980 (#80001271)	66-505 Haleiwa Rd. 21°35′05″N 158°06′49″W	Haleiwa	
163	Waianae District		January 21, 1974 (#74000720)	Address Restricted	Waianae	
164	Waikane Taro Flats		April 11, 1973 (#73000675)	1 mile northwest of Waikane in Upper Waikane Valley; 21°30′16″N 157°52′39″W	North Ko'olaupoko	
165	Waimalu Shopping Center	Waimalu Shopping Center	April 8, 2021 (#100006350)	98-020 Kamehameha Hwy. 21°23′08″N 157°57′00″W	Waimalu	
166	Wakamiya Inari Shrine	Wakamiya Inari Shrine	January 8, 1980 (#80001285)	Waipahu Cultural Garden; 21°23′29″N 158°00′58″W	Waipahu	
167	H. Alexander Walker Residence	H. Alexander Walker Residence	April 24, 1973 (#73000665)	2616 Pali Highway; 21°19′55″N 157°50′38″W	Honolulu	
168	War Memorial Natatorium	War Memorial Natatorium	August 11, 1980 (#80001283)	Kalakaua Ave. 21°15′52″N 157°49′20″W	Honolulu	
169	George R. Ward House	George R. Ward House	February 23, 2016 (#16000029)	2438 Ferdinand Ave. 21°18′32″N 157°49′21″W	Honolulu	
170	Washington Place	Washington Place	June 18, 1973 (#73000666)	320 Beretania St. 21°18′32″N 157°51′24″W	Honolulu	
171	Wheeler Field	Wheeler Field	May 28, 1987 (#87001297)	Area around Wright Ave. and the flight line 21°28′53″N 158°02′15″W	Schofield Barracks	

== Former listings ==
	Name on the Register	Image	Date listed	Date removed	Location	City or town	Description
1	Aiea Sugar Mill	Aiea Sugar Mill	January 11, 1996 (#95001501)	October 14, 2009	99-197 Aiea Heights Dr. 21°23′05″N 157°55′43″W	Aiea	Demolished in 1998
2	FALLS OF CLYDE	FALLS OF CLYDE	July 2, 1973 (#73000659)	February 1, 2024	Pier 7 in Honolulu Harbor; 21°18′21″N 157°51′54″W	Honolulu	Only surviving iron-hulled, four-masted full-rigged ship, and only surviving sail-driven oil tanker in the world.
3	Katsuki House		March 26, 1976 (#76002275)	1978	1326 Keeaumoku St.	Honolulu	Queen Ann "gingerbread"-style house owned by the Katsuki family, destroyed by fire May 6, 1978
4	Lishman Building		September 13, 1978 (#78001023)	October 28, 2012	Makiki Park, Keeaumoku St. 21°18′29″N 157°50′22″W	Honolulu	Demolished
5	Alexander Young Building		August 5, 1980 (#80001284)	October 14, 2009	Bishop St. 21°18′48″N 157°51′48″W	Honolulu	Demolished in 1981

== See also ==
- List of National Historic Landmarks in Hawaii
- National Register of Historic Places listings in Hawaii
