= Grace Cook =

Grace Cook may refer to:

- Songwriter mother of musician Eddie Hazel
- A. Grace Cook, astronomer

== See also ==
- Grace Cooke House in Honolulu
