= Waimalu Shopping Center =

- U.S. National Register of Historic Places
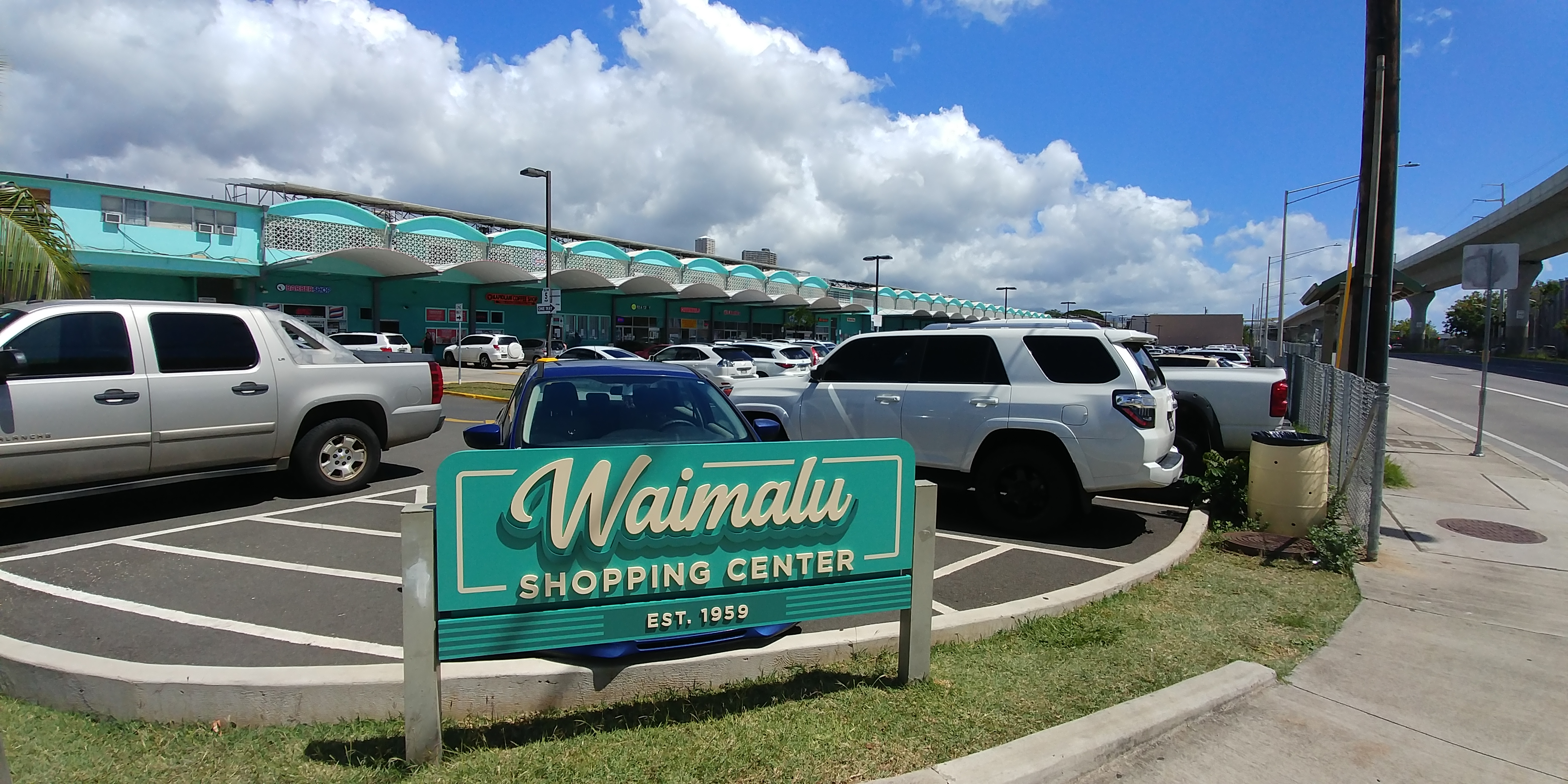
- Location: Waimalu, Hawaii
- Coordinates: 21.3899838°N 157.9501444°W
- Built: 1960
- NRHP reference No.: 100006350
- Added to NRHP: 2021

The Waimalu Shopping Center (formerly known as Waimalu Super Center) is a shopping center located in Waimalu, Hawaii. It opened March 15, 1960 as Waimalu Super Market. The center is listed on the National Register of Historic Places.

== History ==
The Waimalu Super Market was opened in 1960 by Katsumi and Haruko Kazama. In 1963, the property was expanded to a full shopping center with 26 shops, with the Super Market being the anchor tenant. One noted feature of the center are the arches that make up the roof line and the canopy over the entrances to the stores. The architecture of the center is one of only six existing examples of an early modern shopping center.

While the center is historic, the center has remained in active commercial use since its opening. Some tenants having remained open in their current location for more than 50 years, with Waimalu Chop Suey and Waimalu Barber Shop still doing business at Waimalu Shopping Center since the day it opened.

In November 2013, the shopping center celebrated their 50th anniversary. During this celebration period, then Mayor Kirk Caldwell proclaimed November 16, 2013 as Waimalu Shopping Center day.

In 2021, the shopping center was listed on the National Register of Historic Places.
