= Dr. Archibald Neil Sinclair House =

Historic house in Hawaii, United States

- U.S. National Register of Historic Places
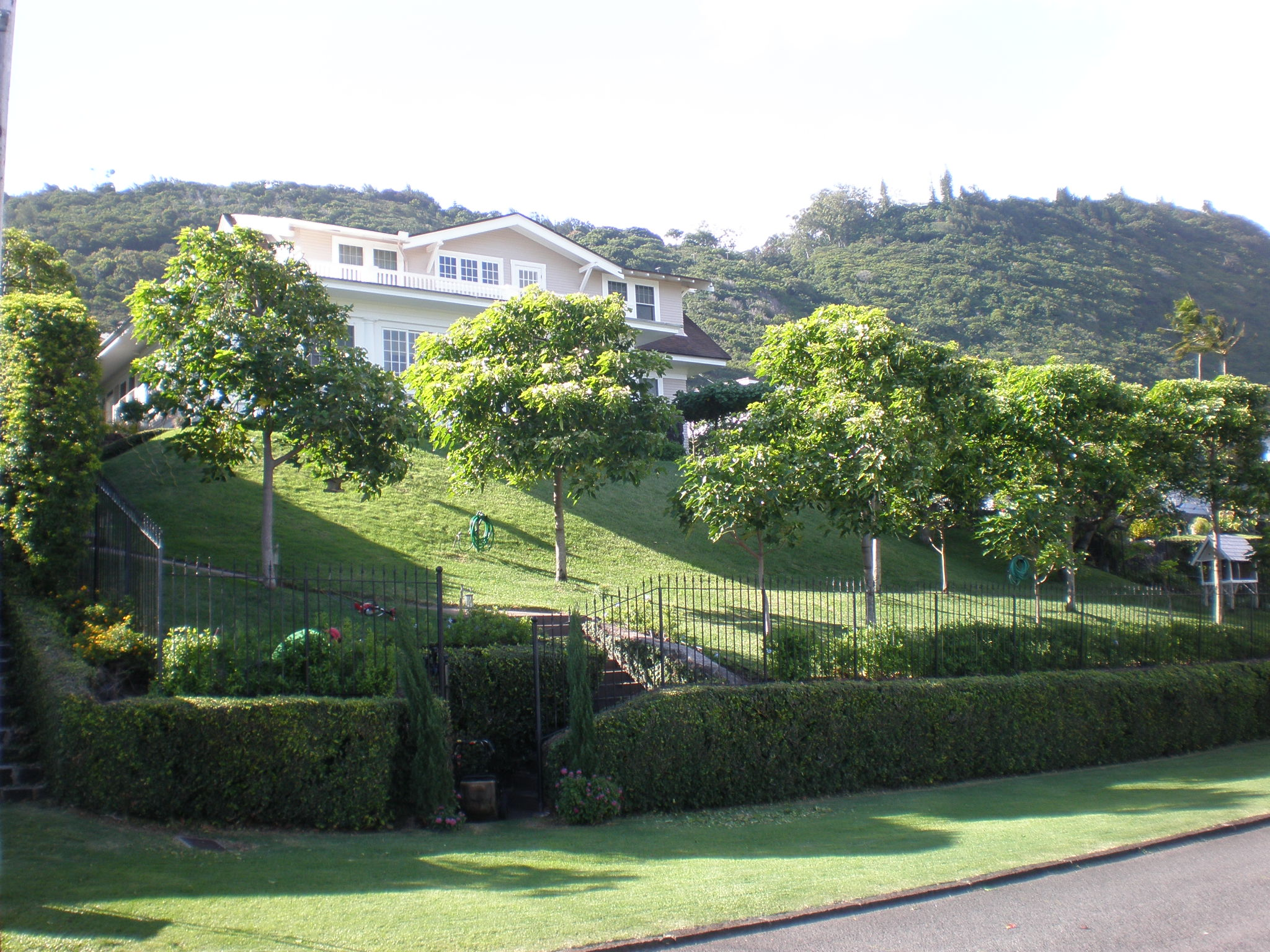
- House and yard from Hillside Ave.

- Location within Hawaii
- Location: 2726 Hillside Ave., Honolulu, Hawaii
- Coordinates: 21°18′52″N 157°49′8″W
- Area: 13,405 sq. ft. (lot), 2,811 sq. ft. (house), 240 sq. ft. (maid's quarters)
- Built: 1917
- Architect: Walter Emory, Marshall Webb
- Architectural style: Colonial Revival
- NRHP reference No.: 83003557
- Added to NRHP: 13 October 1983

The Dr. Archibald Neil Sinclair House on Puʻu Pueo ('Owl Hill') overlooking Mānoa Valley and Diamond Head on the island of Oʻahu was built in 1917 in a Colonial Revival style designed by a leading local architectural firms, Emory and Webb, who also designed the Hawaii Theatre and other fine buildings on the island. The large, sloping property has two entrances: one below the front lawn at 2726 Hillside Ave., the other above the house at 2725 Terrace Dr., Honolulu, Hawaiʻi. It was listed in the National Register of Historic Places in 1983.

The two-story, wood frame, 2,811 sq. ft. main house is a fine example of the Colonial Revival style as adapted to Hawaiʻi, with extensive verandahs and balconies outside and open spaces inside delineated by columns rather than walls. Its foundation rests on lava rock and redwood piles. There is a separate, 240 sq. ft. maid's quarters and garage accessible from Terrace Drive and an underground bomb shelter (added later) below the front lawn.

Dr. Sinclair (b. 20 January 1871) was a prominent physician whose father had come to Honolulu from New York to supervise the construction of ʻIolani Palace. He attended Punahou School then obtained a medical degree from the University of Glasgow in Scotland in 1894.

He began his medical practice in England before returning to Honolulu, where he served with the United States Public Health Service (1900–1919), as city physician (1901–1909), and as founding director of Leahi Home for tuberculosis patients (1901). His published research in the fields of bacteriology, immunology, and pulmonary diseases earned him induction into the American College of Physicians and other medical societies. The Sinclair Society of pulmonary specialists is named for him.

The house was built in the College Hills tract (named for Oahu College, now Punahou School), a rapidly expanding suburb of Honolulu that was newly served by the extension of electric streetcar lines into Mānoa in 1901 and the relocation of the College of Hawaii to Mānoa in 1912. Many later residents of the house have been students and faculty of the University, the most notable being Janet Bell, who served as curator of the Hawaiian Collection from 1936 until 1970.

== Gallery ==
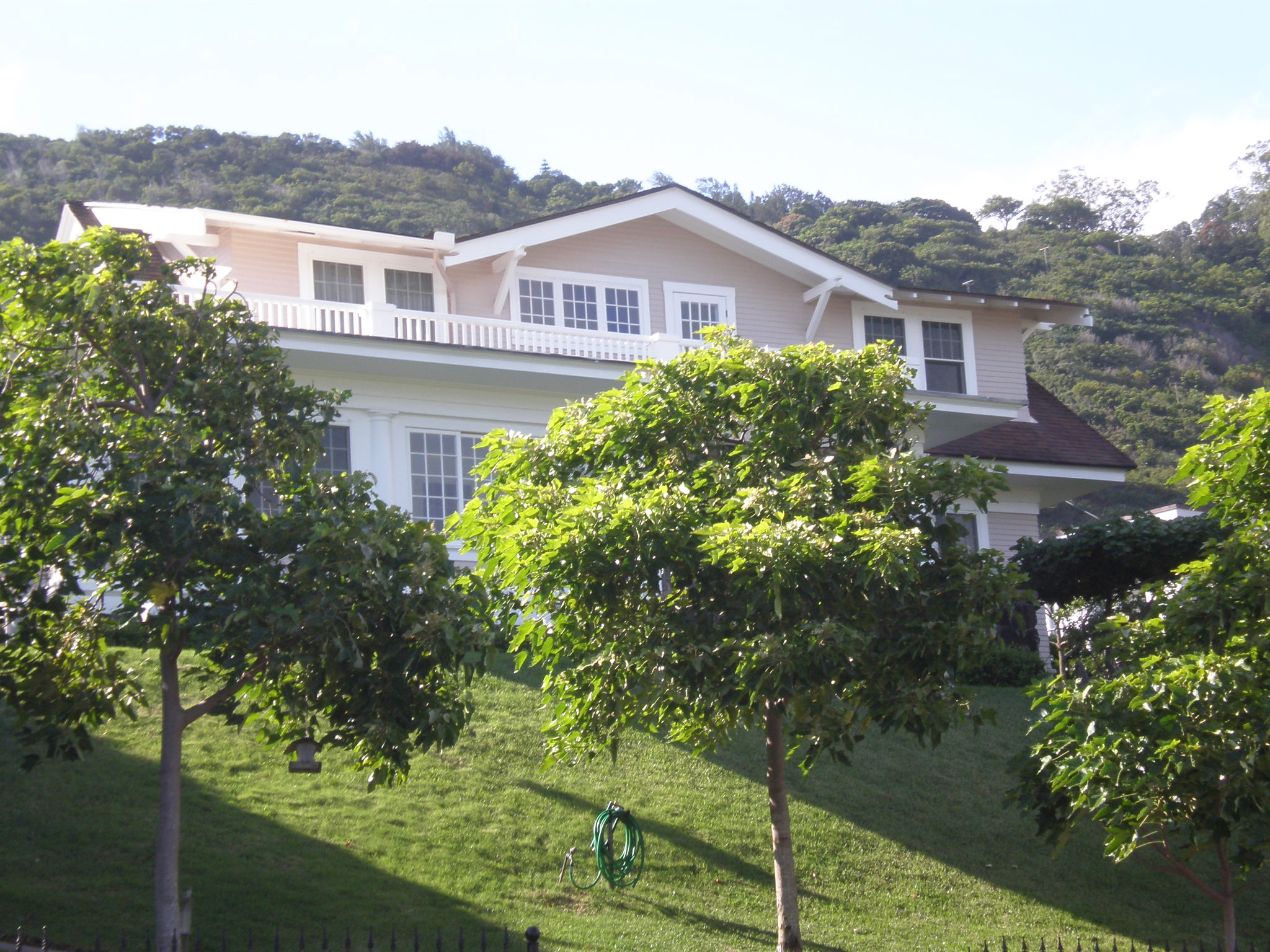
Closer view of house from Hillside Ave.

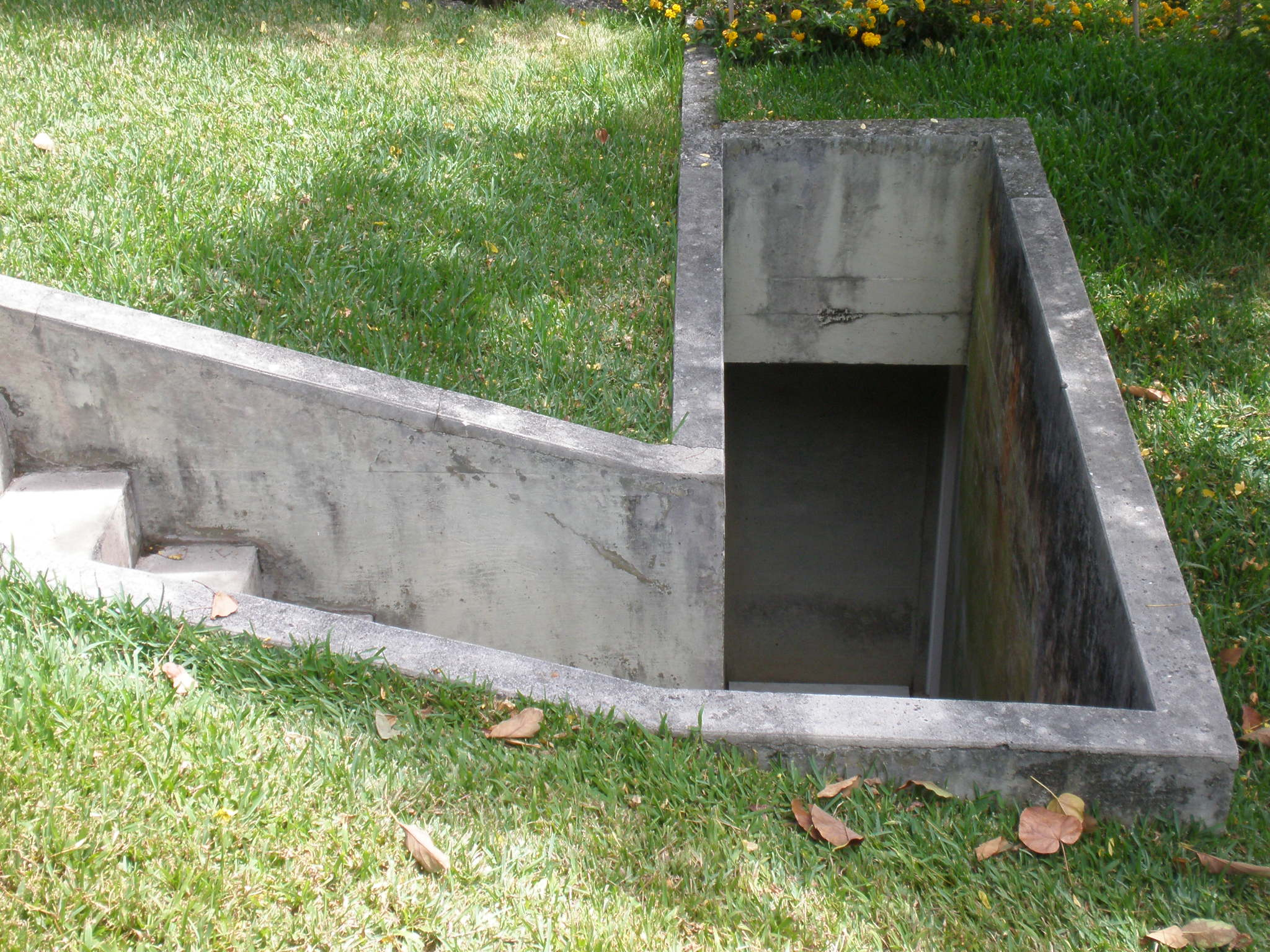
Entrance to bomb shelter in lawn

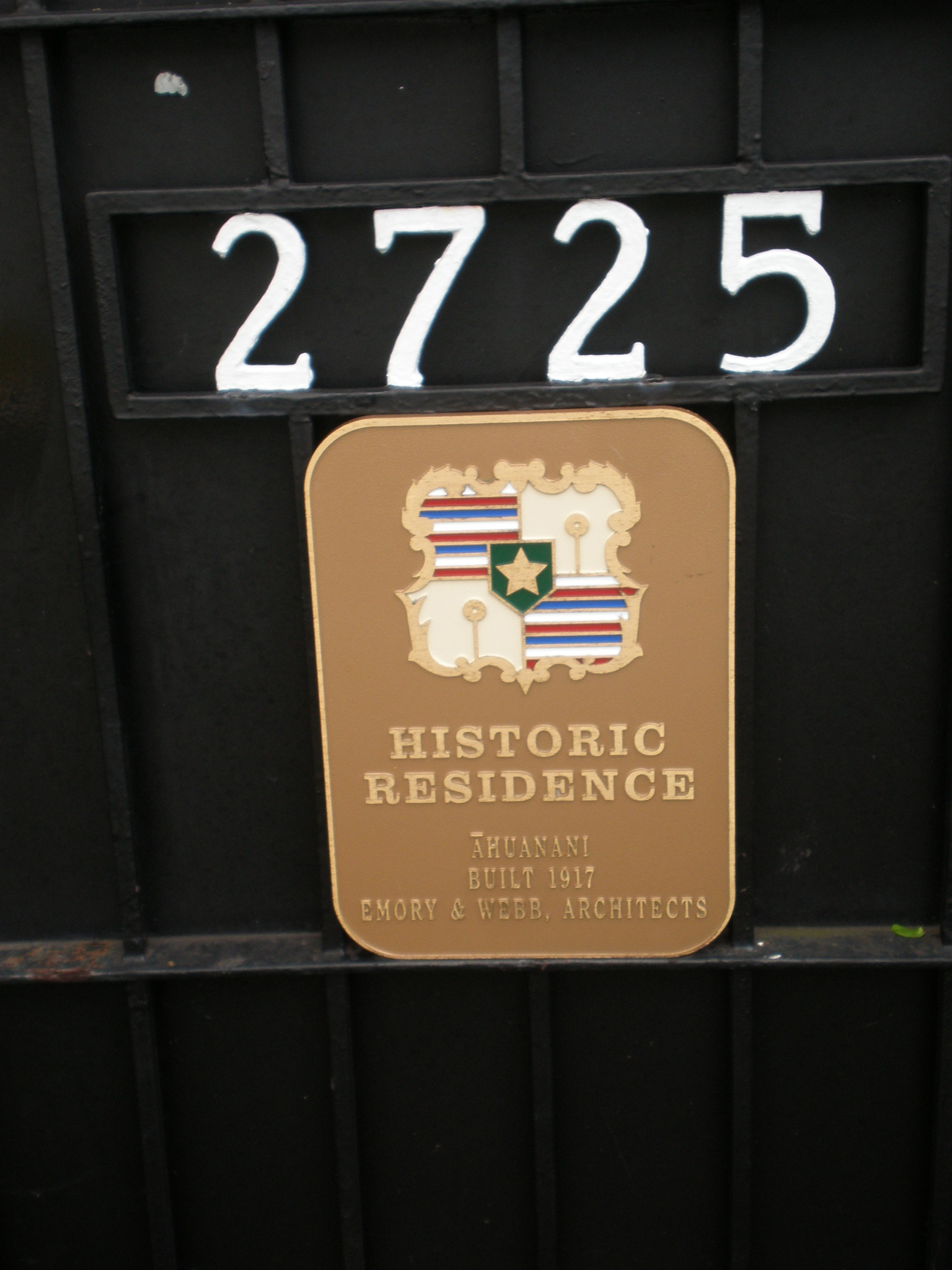
State of Hawaii Historic Residence plaque at gate on Terrace Dr.
