= C. W. Dickey House =

Historic house in Hawaii, United States

- U.S. National Register of Historic Places
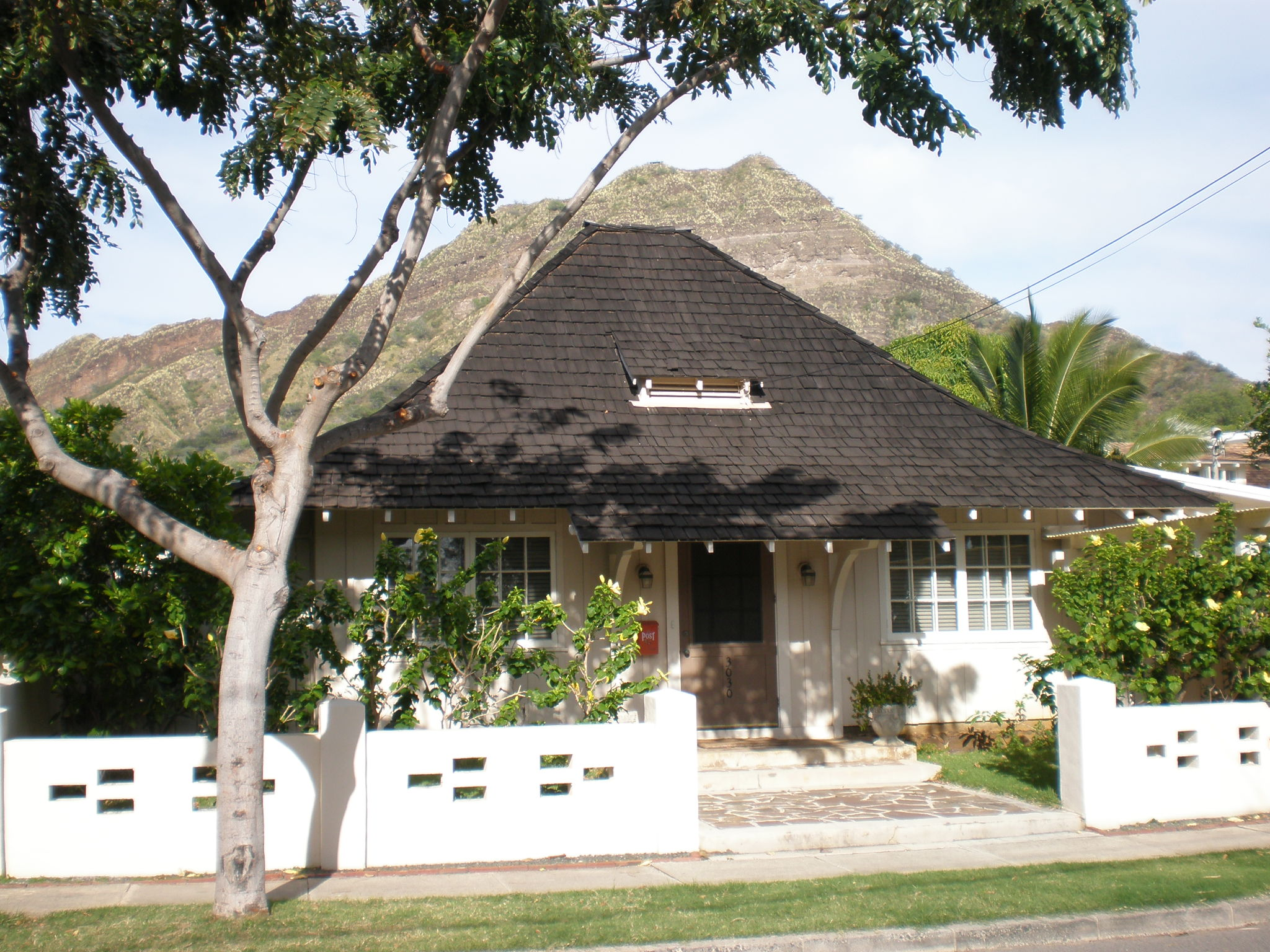
- View from street

- Location within Hawaii
- Location: 3030 Kalakaua Ave., Honolulu, Hawaii
- Coordinates: 21°15′43″N 157°49′16″W
- Area: 0.1 acres (0.040 ha)
- Built: 1926
- Architect: C.W. Dickey
- Architectural style: "Hawaiian"
- NRHP reference No.: 84000201
- Added to NRHP: November 1, 1984

The C. W. Dickey House at 3030 Kalakaua Avenue in Honolulu, Hawaiʻi, was one of the earliest residences designed by Charles William Dickey in his "Hawaiian style" after he resettled in the islands in 1925. He built it for himself and lived in it from 1926 until 1933, when he built himself a rather less humble dwelling at Makalei Place on the front slope of Diamond Head. The house was added to the National Register of Historic Places in 1984.

The house is significant as an early prototype of Dickey's "Hawaiian style" architecture and for its association with one of Hawaiʻi's most famous architects. The double-pitched hip roof with overhanging eaves became such a Dickey trademark that it is often called a "Dickey roof." Other features of the style include many windows and an enclosed lānai. He employed a similar style for the cottages he designed for the Halekulani Hotel during the same era.

This single-story house has board-and-batten siding and acid-stained decorative concrete flooring. The front entrance leads into a living room as wide as the face of the house, which opens into a dining room (with connecting kitchen) one step below the living room, and then a rear lanai behind sliding doors. One rear wing contains two bedrooms separated by a bath, and the other a pantry, a maid's quarters, and a garage (now enclosed to form another bedroom).
