= George D. Oakley House =

Historic house in Hawaii, United States

- U.S. National Register of Historic Places
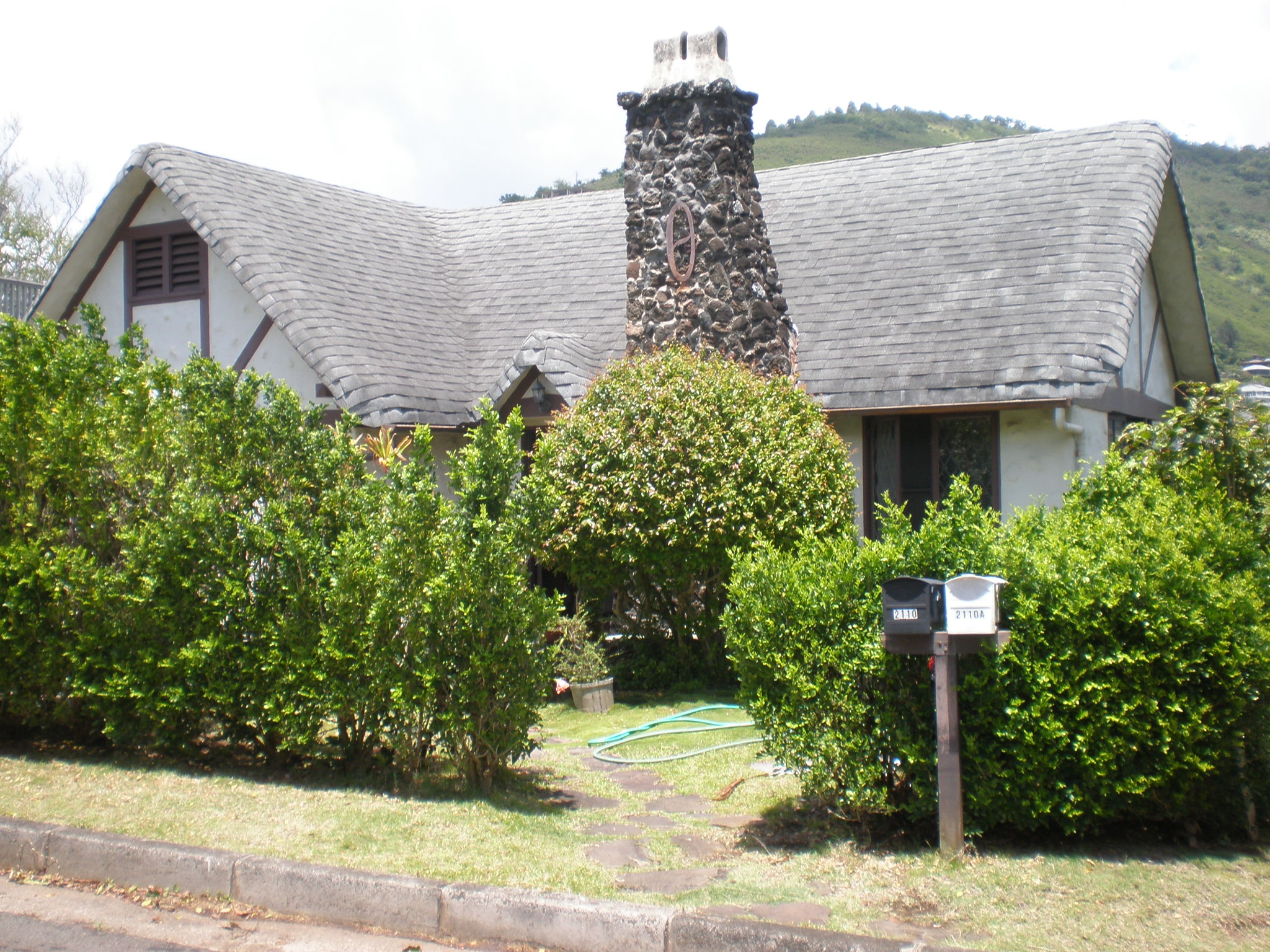
- View from street

- Location within Hawaii
- Location: 2110 Kakela Pl., Honolulu, Hawaii
- Coordinates: 21°18′27″N 157°49′40″W
- Area: 6,991 sq. ft.
- Built: 1929
- Architect: Miles H. Gray
- Architectural style: English Tudor cottage
- NRHP reference No.: 84000249
- Added to NRHP: 15 November 1984

The George D. Oakley House at 2110 Kakela Place in Honolulu, Hawaiʻi, was built in 1929 in the English Cottage style of architecture popular in Hawaiʻi during the 1920s and 1930s. This house is one of the finest of only two dozen or so extant houses of similar style in the state. Signature elements of the style include asymmetrical massing, a roof shaped to resemble thatch, a gable with half-timbered facade, a king post truss ceiling, diamond-shaped casement windows, decorative as well as functional wrought iron, and even a tiny window in the chimney. Its architect was Miles H. Gray, an engineer with the U.S. Army Quartermaster Corps. The basement floor of acid-stained decorative concrete is also a rare surviving example of a technique pioneered by Robert D. Lammens during the 1920s. The house was listed in the National Register of Historic Places in 1984.

A native of Scotland, George Oakley arrived in Hawaiʻi during the 1910s by way of the continental U.S. In 1920 he married Dean Spry and they lived in Kāneʻohe, where he managed a pineapple farm. After the farm ceased operations in 1923, he found work as a linotype operator and writer for the local newspapers until he retired in 1948. During the 1930s he served as music editor for the Honolulu Star-Bulletin, writing a regular column, "Music on the Tradewinds." The family also started a business to promote musical concerts, Artists' Services of Honolulu, which between the 1930s and early 1960s brought famous talents to perform in Honolulu, including Yehudi Menuhin, Arthur Rubenstein, and the Vienna Boys Choir.

After the death of their daughter, Nancy Oakley Hedemann, in 2010, the house was put on the market, with a list price of $1.2 million.

== Gallery ==
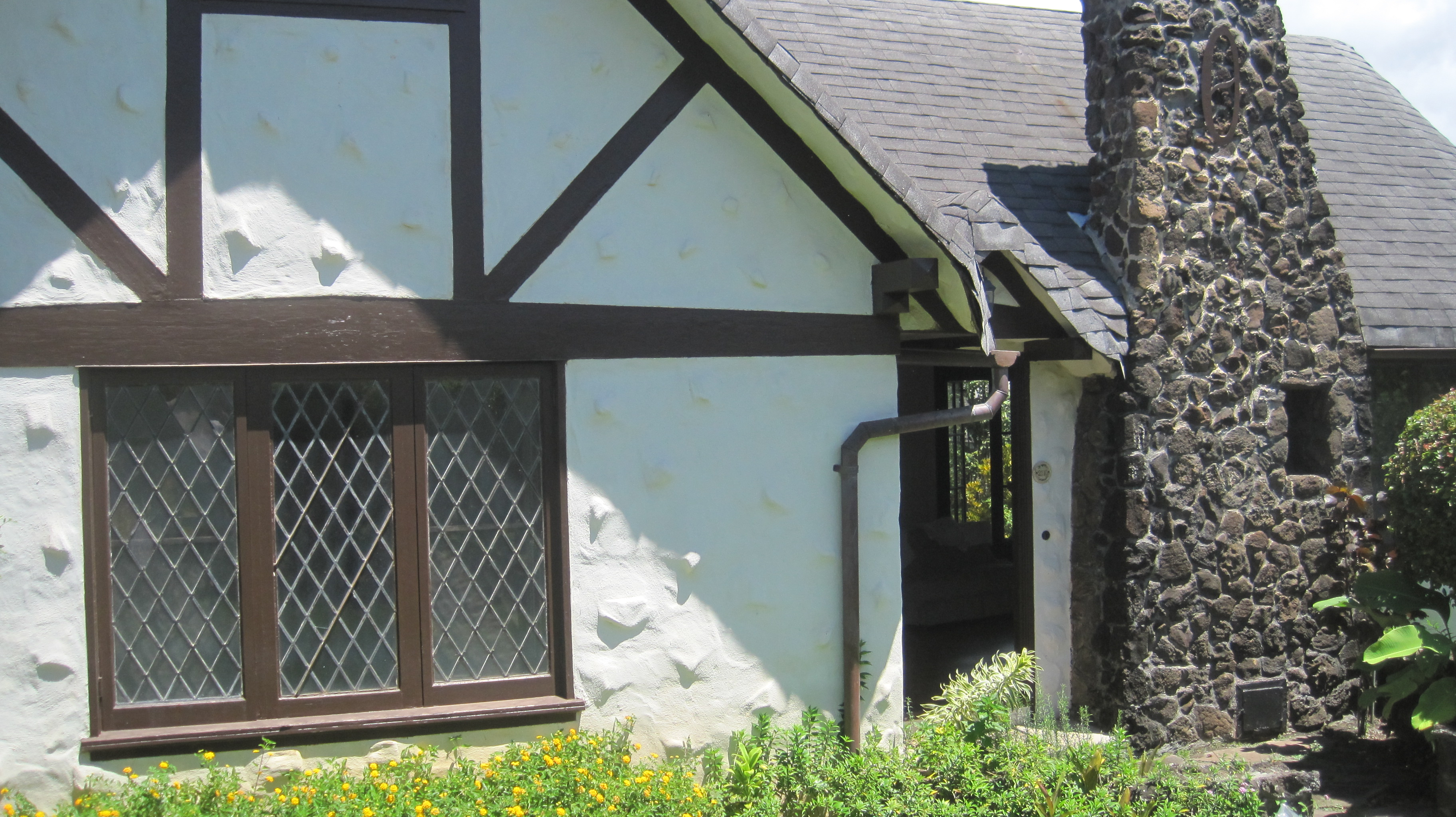
Diamond-paned casement window & lava-rock chimney with monogram "O"

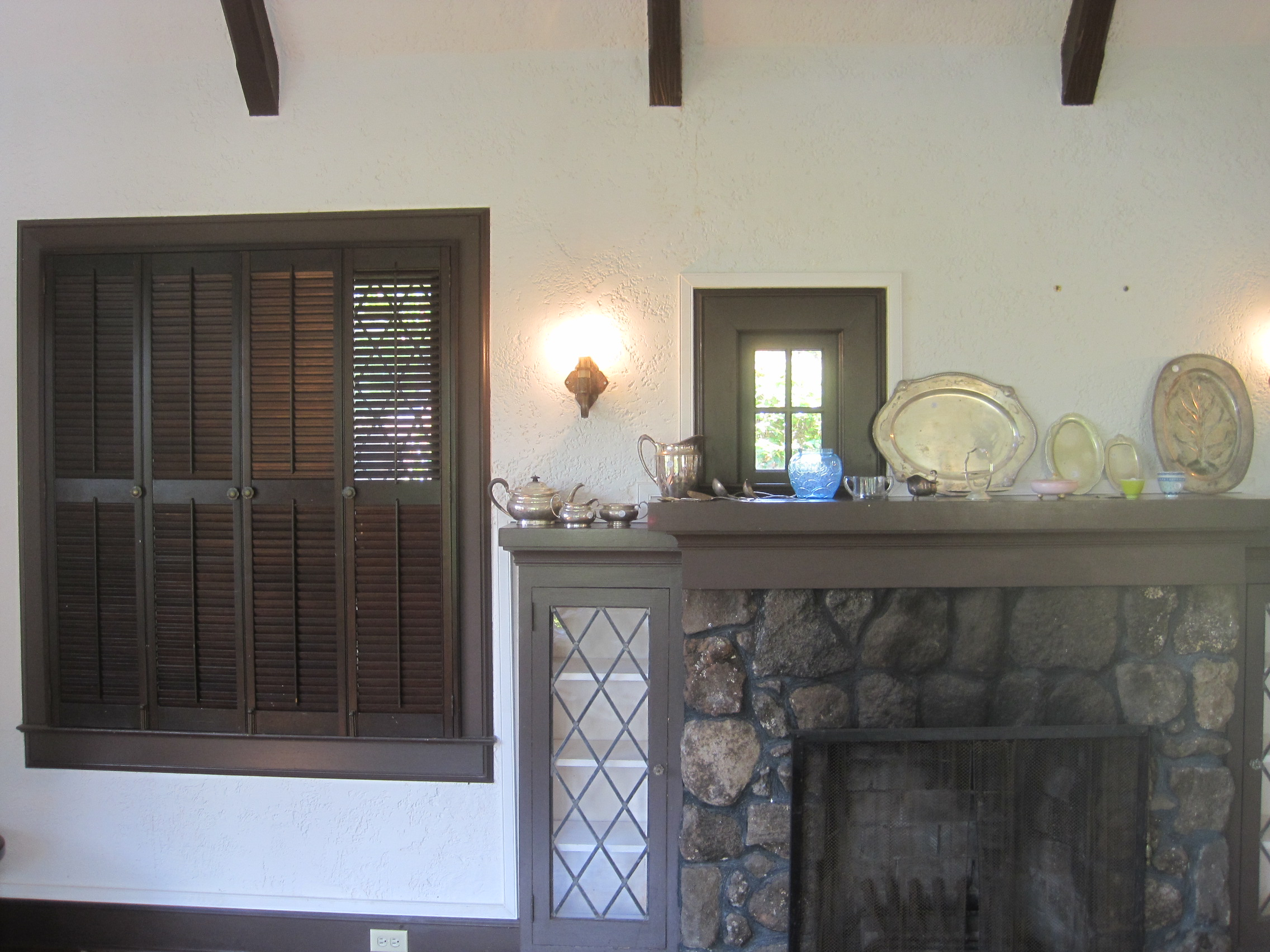
Ground floor fireplace & chimney window

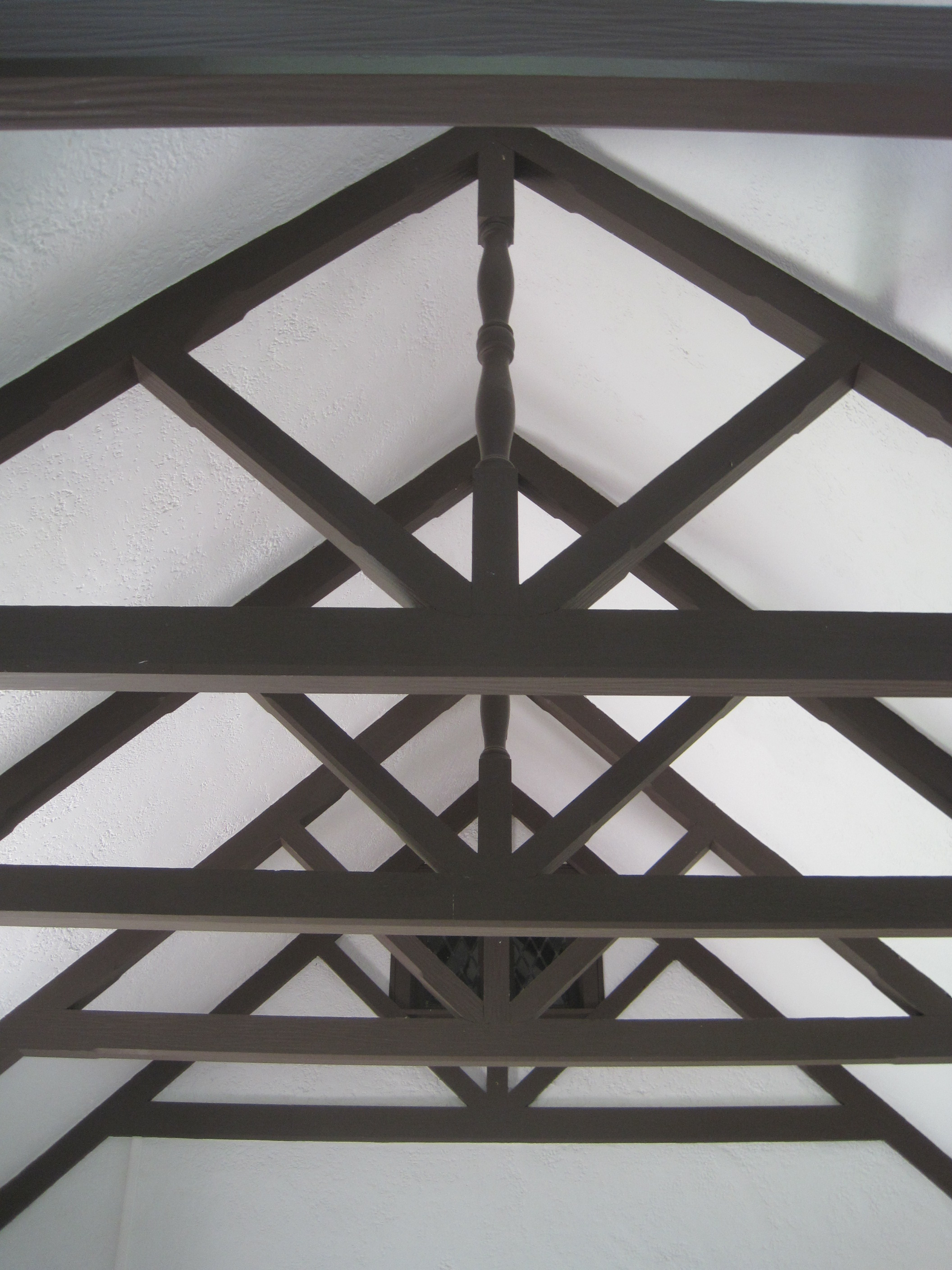
King post truss ceiling in living room

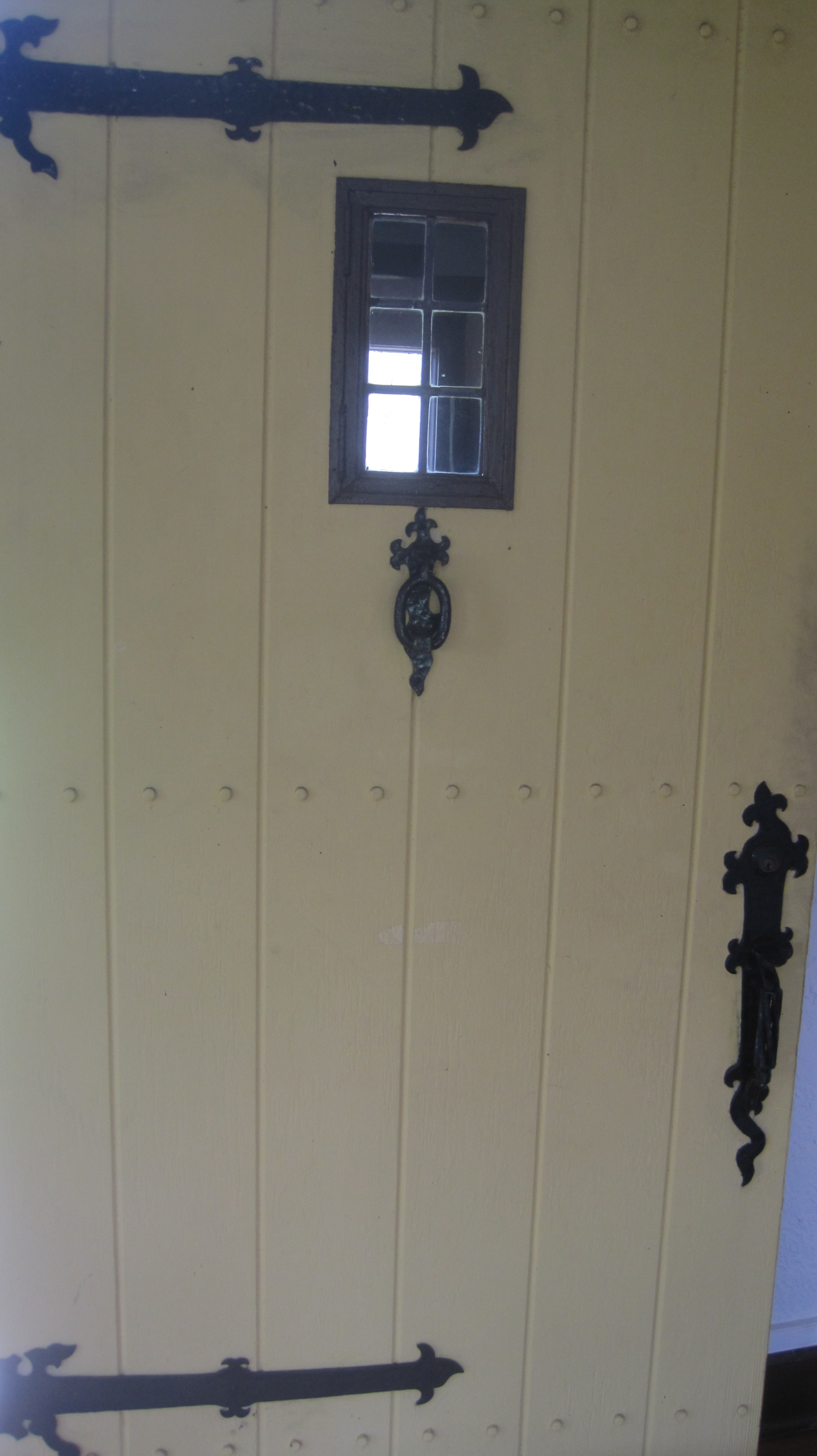
Front door with wrought-iron fixtures

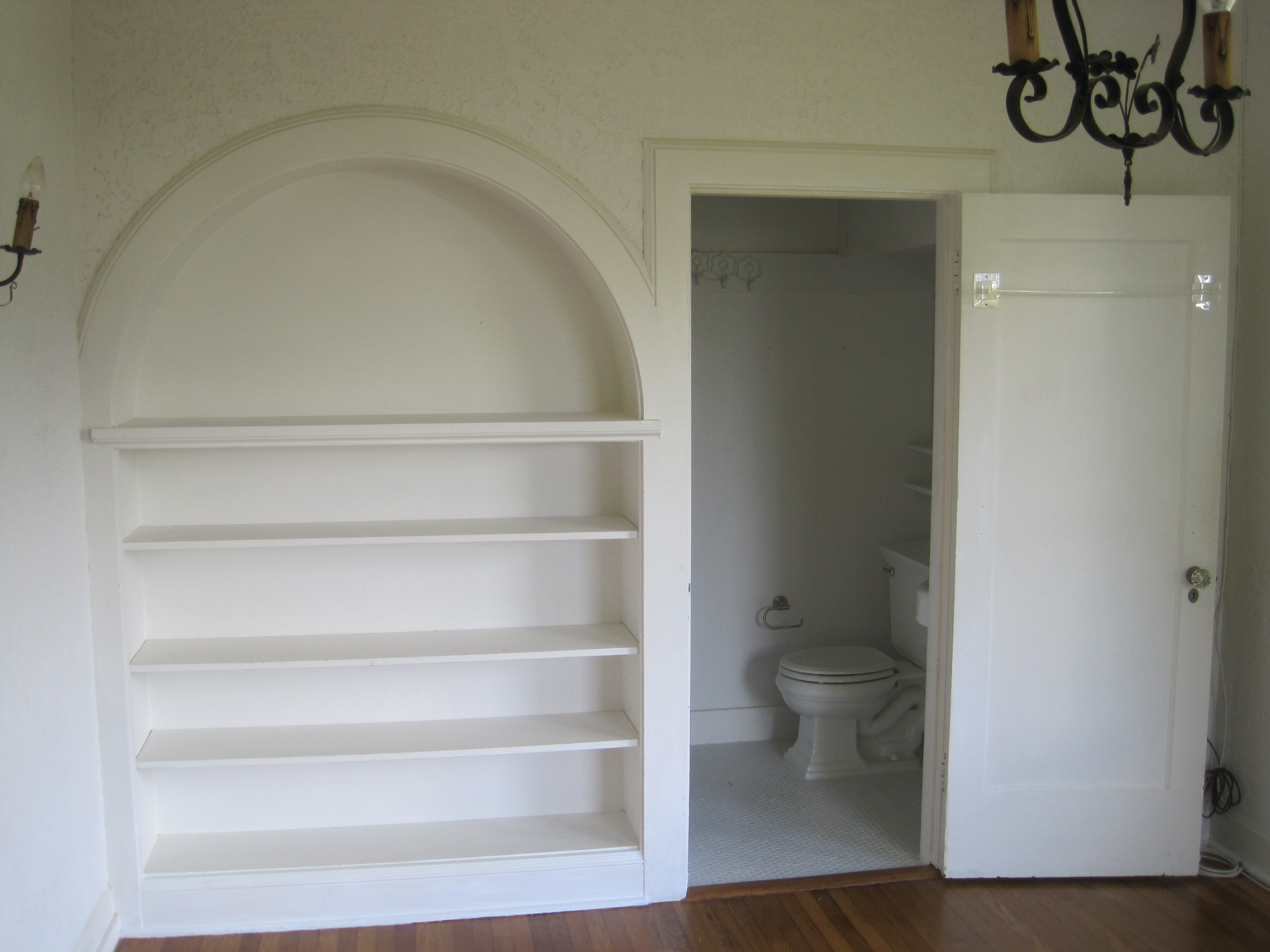
Master bedroom with bath & built-in shelving

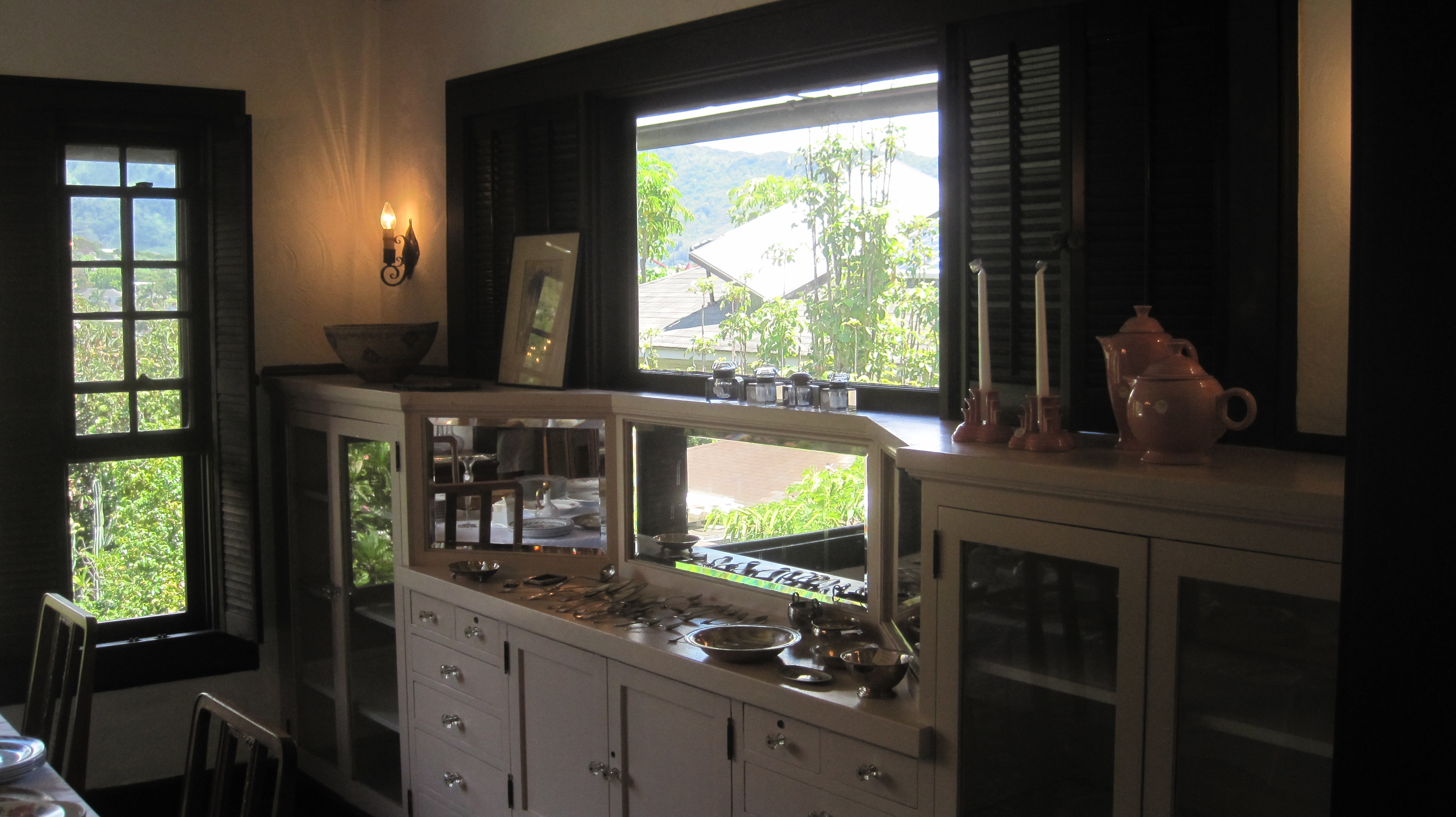
Dining room windows and built-in cupboard

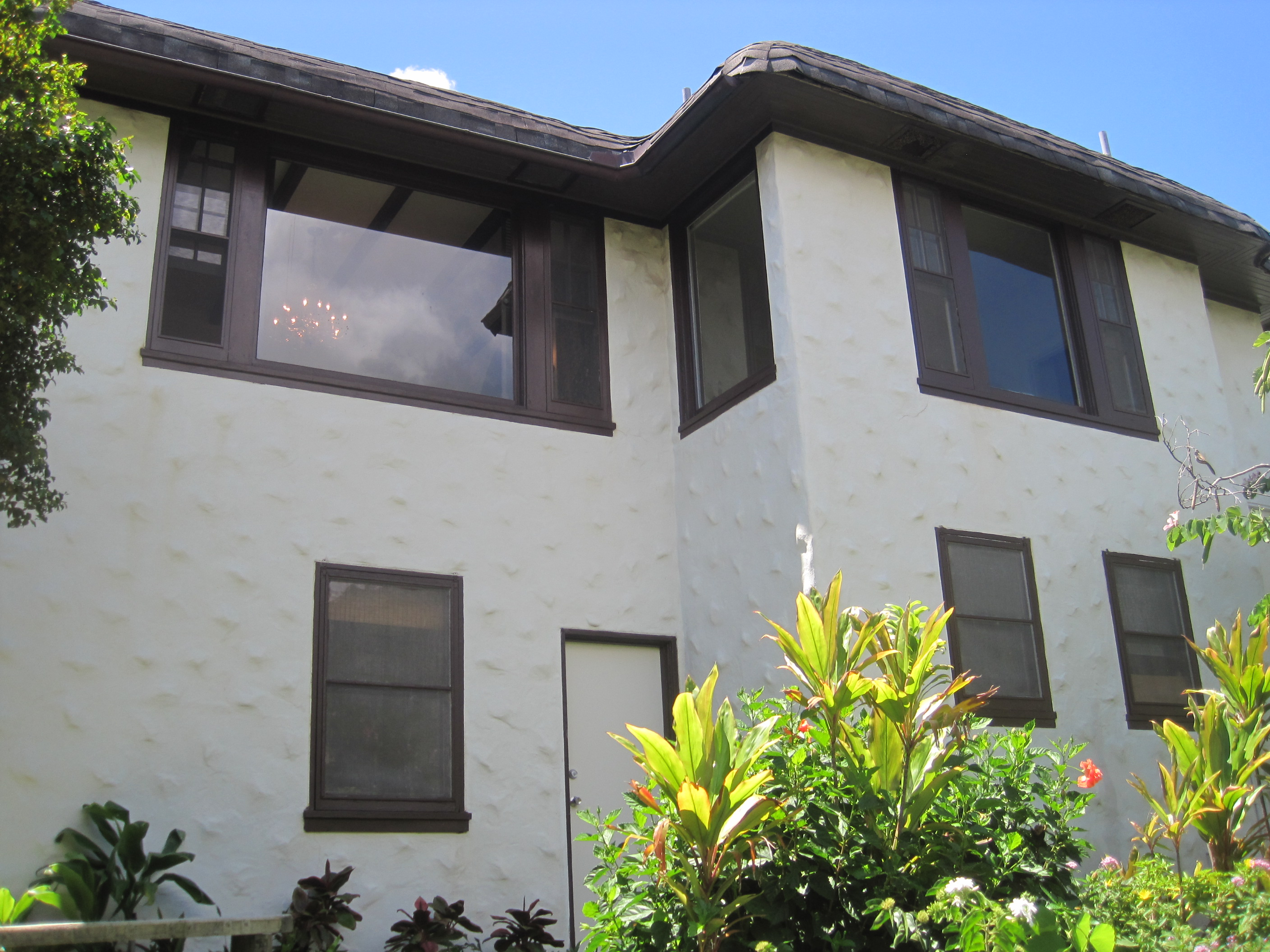
Rear elevation

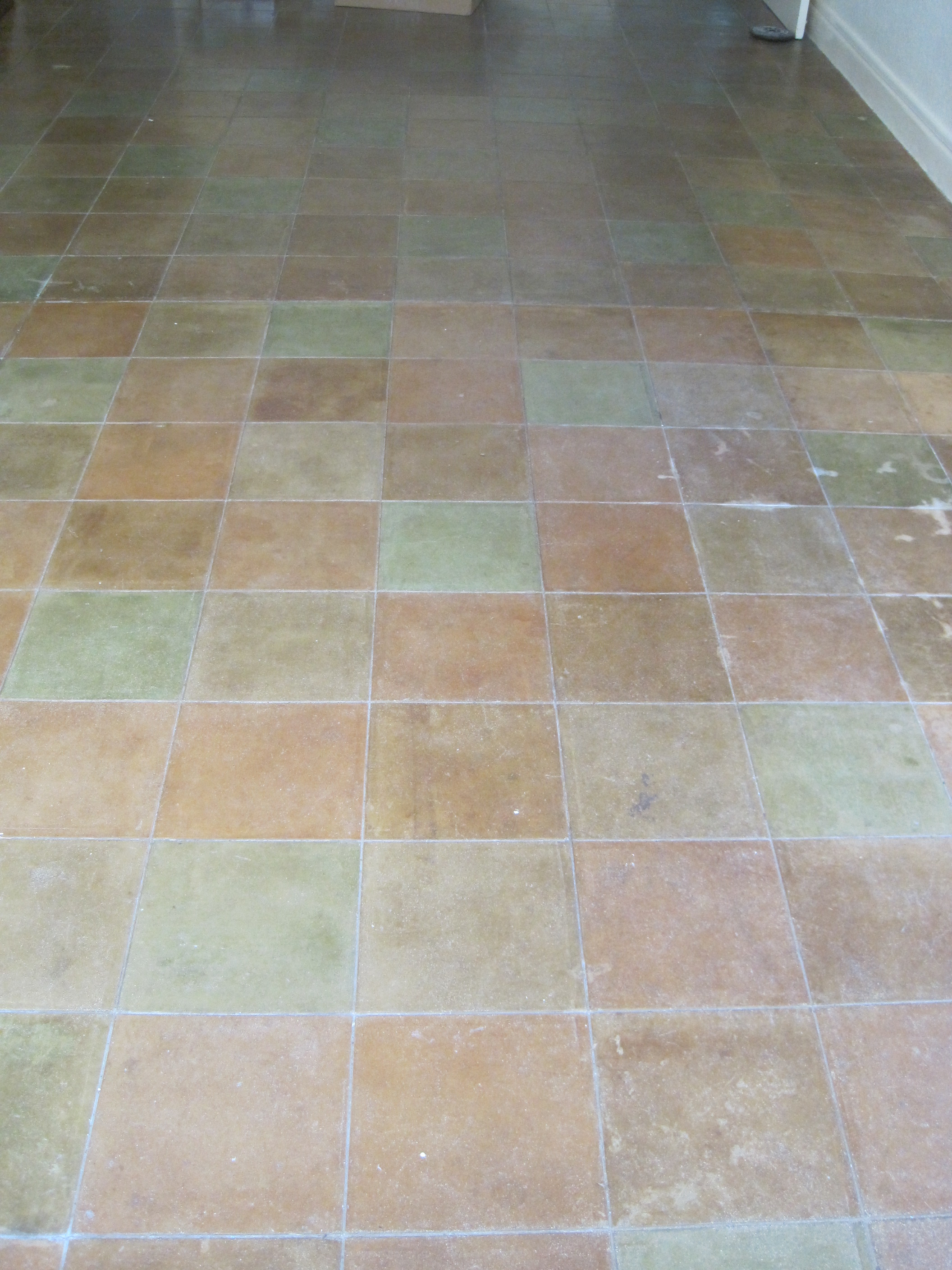
Acid-stained decorative concrete floor in basement
