= Olomana High & Intermediate School =

School in Hawaii, United States

Coordinates: 21.371675°N 157.748877°W

Olomana High & Intermediate School part of Hawaii Department of Education, is an alternative-education school which offers classes for students in seventh grade through twelfth grade. Located at 42-471 Kalanianaole Highway Kailua, Hawaii 96734, United States, the school has about 250 students attending.

== History ==
In Hawaii, the practice of youth incarceration dates back to the period of the Hawaiian monarchy. In 1864, on the island of Oahu, King Kamehameha V created the Keoneula Reformatory School for boys and girls in Kapalama, the first juvenile facility of its kind in the islands. In 1903, 75 of the boys were relocated to farmland in Waialeʻe (near Pūpūkea) on Oahu's North Shore. Then in succeeding decades various types of facilities and locales were used to house, train, and educate the youths. Finally in 1961 the boys’ and girls’ operations were combined to form the Hawaii Youth Correctional Facility (Hawaii Department of Human Services) now based in Kailua. The facility later experienced its own series of moves as it went from one agency’s headship to another. In 1987, the Legislature created a juvenile justice interdisciplinary committee to study and determine the appropriate placement of the youth corrections program. The committee report, made in January 1989, recommended that a youth services agency be created and attached to the Department of Human Services for administrative purposes.

== Service ==
The school provides educational services for Hawaii Youth Correctional Facility, Secure Custody Facility, Ho’okipa Canoe House, Olomana Youth Center and Detention Home Facility (Olomana School). Olomana High & Intermediate School made Adequate Yearly Progress (AYP) in 2007. Under “No Child Left Behind,” a school makes AYP if it achieves the minimum levels of improvement determined by the state of Hawaii in terms of student performance and other accountability measures. With 31 full-time classroom teachers Olomana High & Intermediate School has 6 students for every full-time equivalent teacher. The Hawaii average is 16 students per full-time equivalent teacher.

== Accomplishments ==
Olomana School is the first of its kind in the nation to participate in a Botball robotics tournament. Teams designed robots that would automatically tackle a series of tasks, including collecting balls and pineapples as well as clearing away lava debris. In 2007 the team captured three awards in regional competition at the Hawaii Convention Center.
