= Hanakaoe Burial Platform =

- Burial Platform
- U.S. National Register of Historic Places
- Nearest city: Kahuku, Hawaii
- Area: 0.1 acres (0.040 ha)
- NRHP reference No.: 73000670
- Added to NRHP: August 14, 1973

The Hanakaoe Burial Platform is a heiau site located in Kahuku, Oahu island, Hawaii.

The site consists of a triangular rock platform which was used as a burial site, as well as some associated structures. It was added to the National Register of Historic Places on August 14, 1973.

== See also ==
- Heiau sites in Hawaiʻi
