= Grace Cooke House =

Historic house in Hawaii, United States

- U.S. National Register of Historic Places
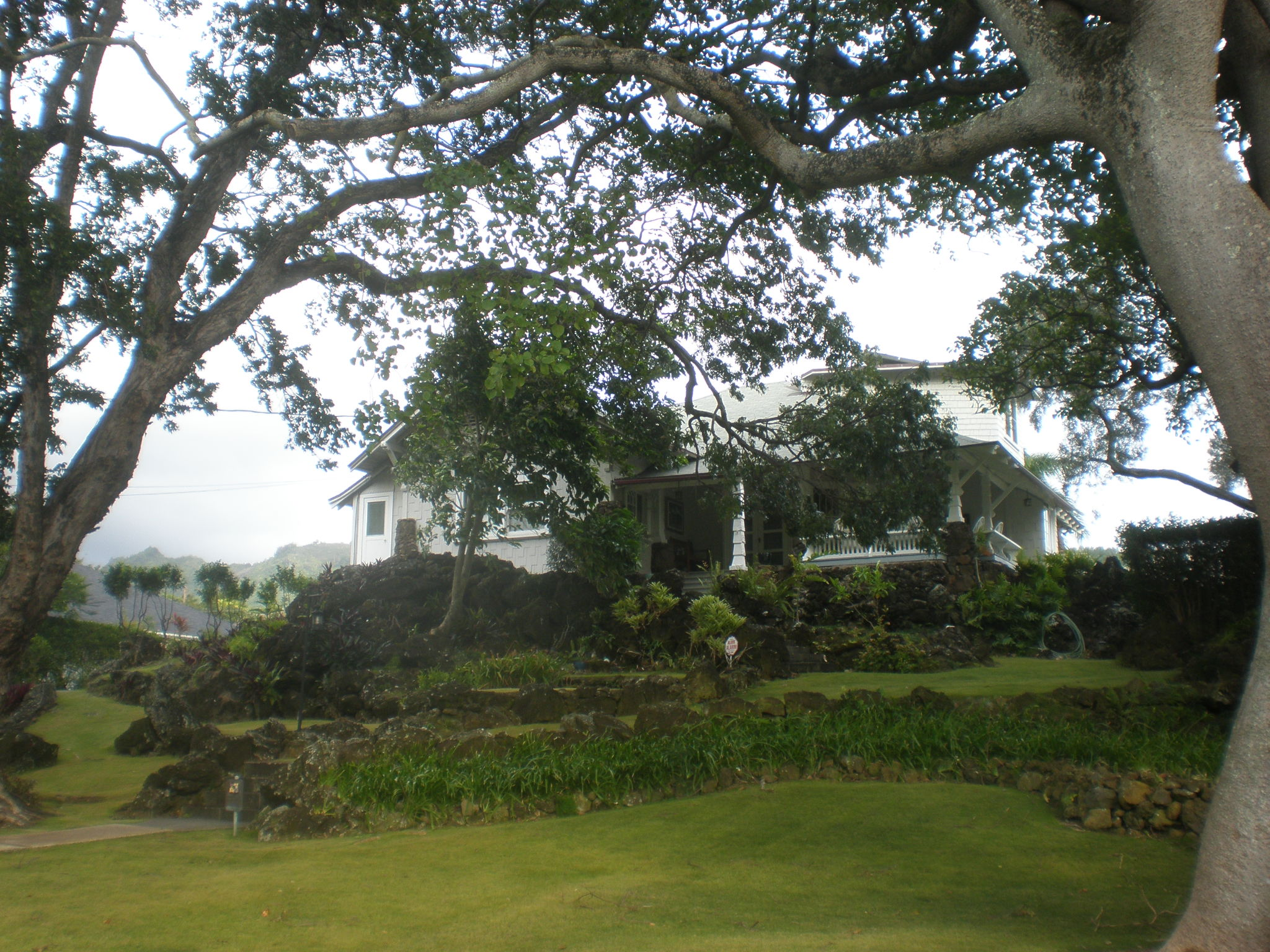
- View from Oahu Ave.

- Location within Hawaii
- Location: 2365 Oahu Ave., Honolulu, Hawaii
- Coordinates: 21°18′39″N 157°49′16″W
- Area: 13,500 sq ft (0.31 acres; 0.125 ha)
- Built: 1912
- Architectural style: American Craftsman bungalow
- NRHP reference No.: 83003556
- Added to NRHP: October 24, 1983

The Grace Cooke House, also known as the Harold St. John Residence, at 2365 Oʻahu Avenue in Honolulu, Hawaiʻi, is significant both for its American Craftsman bungalow architecture and landscaping and for its most famous resident, Harold St. John, a distinguished professor of botany at the University of Hawaiʻi. The house and lot were added to the National Register of Historic Places in 1983, by which time St. John was living in a separate small cottage to the rear of the lot.

The craftsmanship orientation of the period can also be seen in the landscaping, in particular the integration of the bluestone steps up to the front porch, the lava rock foundation, and the natural rock outcrop on which the house sits. The spacious porch wraps around the right side of the house, balanced by a gable-roofed wing on the left. The rest of the house has a shingled hip roof. Finely crafted exposed rafters embellish both the hip and gable roofs, decorative shingle patterns adorn the exterior walls, windows, and porch columns, and a simple balustrade lines the porch.

Two sets of double doors lead from the porch into the interior, with bedrooms and bath on the left and a large open living and dining area on the right, with paneled walls and coffered ceilings. The kitchen is off the dining area to the right, and a basement originally served as a maid's quarters. The attic was partly finished and two dormers were added by St. John during the 1930s. The remainder of the house is unaltered.

The lot also has some striking mature trees in the front yard, including two Royal Poinciana (Delonix regia) beside the driveway, a West Indian mahogany (Swietenia mahagoni), and a huge Sandbox tree (Hura crepitans) that has been designated an "exceptional tree" by the City and County of Honolulu.

== Gallery ==
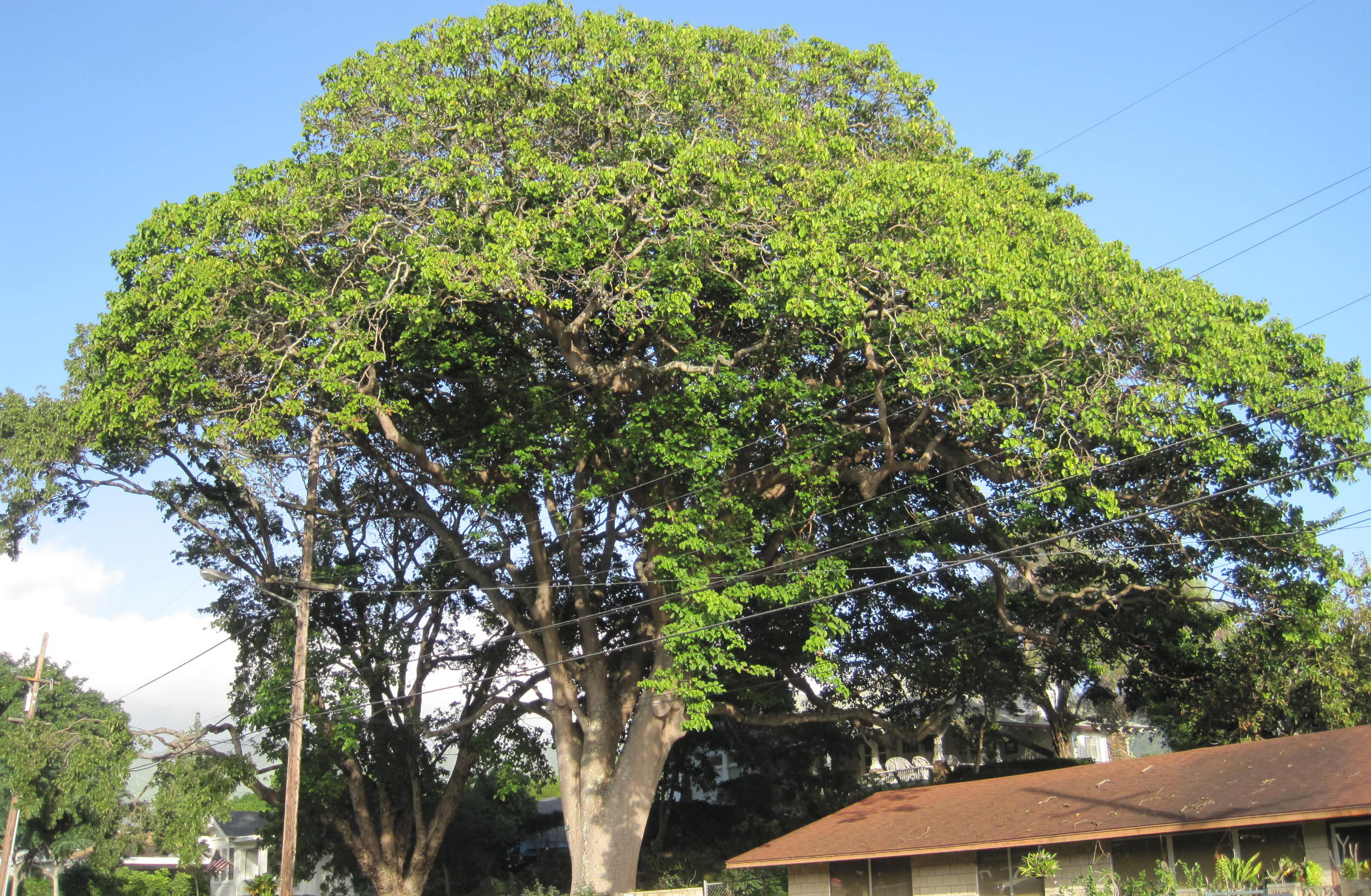
Sandbox tree in front yard

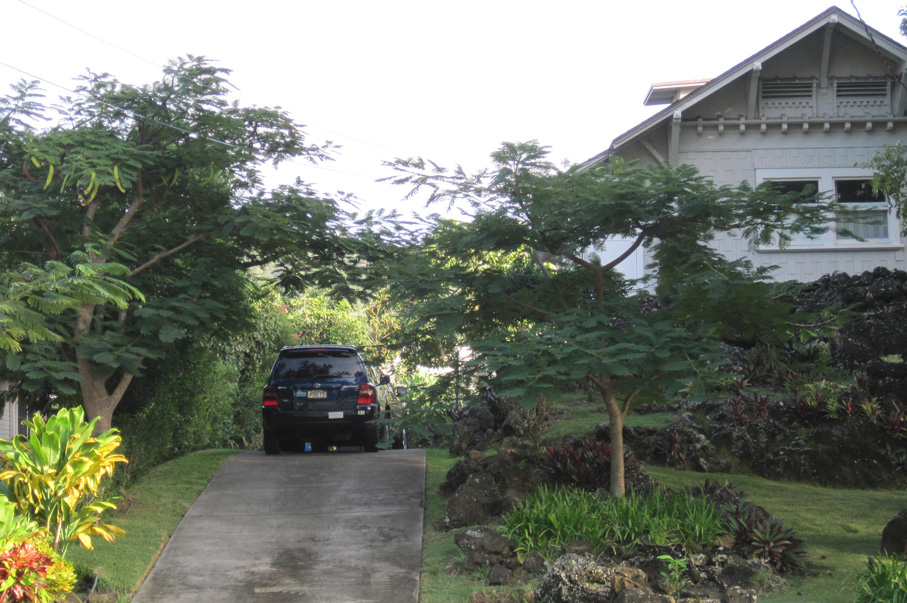
Royal Poinciana trees

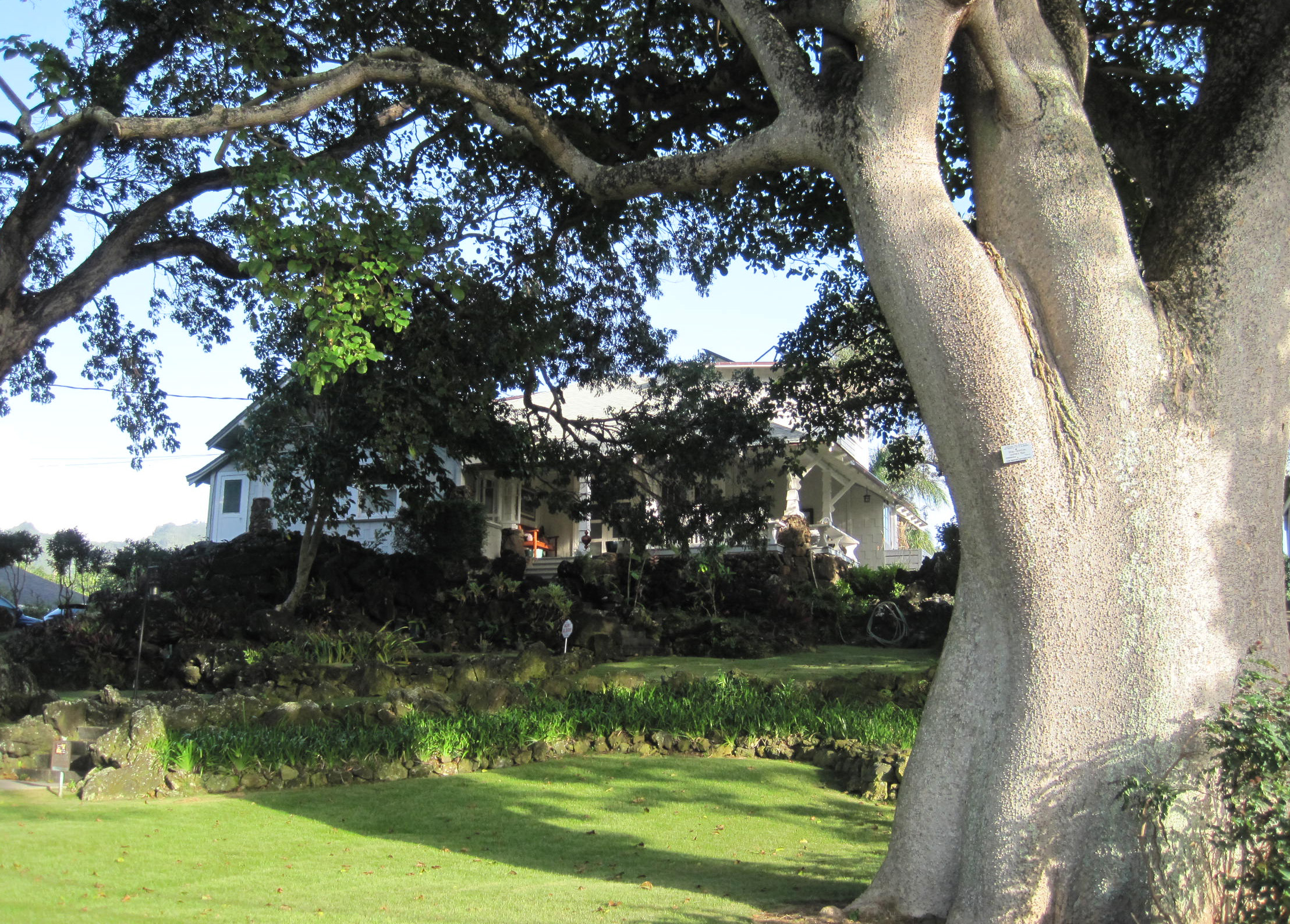
Front yard and sandbox tree
