= Waimalu, Hawaii =

Census-designated place in Hawaii, United States

Waimalu
- Census-designated place
- Location in Honolulu County and the state of Hawaii
- Coordinates: 21°23′57″N 157°56′54″W
- Country: United States
- State: Hawaii

Area
  - Total: 1.92 sq mi (4.97 km^{2})
  - Land: 1.83 sq mi (4.74 km^{2})
  - Water: 0.089 sq mi (0.23 km^{2})
- Elevation: 377 ft (115 m)

Population (2020)
  - Total: 13,817
  - Density: 7,546.2/sq mi (2,913.61/km^{2})
- Time zone: UTC-10 (Hawaii-Aleutian)
- Area code: 808
- FIPS code: 15-77750
- GNIS feature ID: 1867264

Waimalu (Hawaiian pronunciation: [vɐjˈmɐlu], lit. 'sheltered water') is a census-designated place (CDP) in Honolulu County, Hawaiʻi, United States. The population was 13,817 at the 2020 census.

== Geography ==
Waimalu is located at 21°23′57″N 157°56′54″W (21.399150, -157.948432).

According to the United States Census Bureau, the CDP has a total area of 1.9 square miles (5.0 km^{2}), of which 1.8 square miles (4.7 km^{2}) is land and 0.077 square miles (0.2 km^{2}), or 4.62%, is water.

== Demographics ==
Historical population
Census	Pop.	Note	%±
2020	13,817		—
U.S. Decennial Census

=== 2020 census ===
As of the 2020 census, Waimalu had a population of 13,817. The median age was 43.4 years. 16.5% of residents were under the age of 18 and 20.8% of residents were 65 years of age or older. For every 100 females there were 98.2 males, and for every 100 females age 18 and over there were 96.7 males age 18 and over.

100.0% of residents lived in urban areas, while 0.0% lived in rural areas.

There were 5,757 households in Waimalu, of which 22.8% had children under the age of 18 living in them. Of all households, 40.2% were married-couple households, 24.5% were households with a male householder and no spouse or partner present, and 28.2% were households with a female householder and no spouse or partner present. About 32.8% of all households were made up of individuals and 12.1% had someone living alone who was 65 years of age or older.

There were 6,127 housing units, of which 6.0% were vacant. The homeowner vacancy rate was 0.7% and the rental vacancy rate was 5.9%.

Racial composition as of the 2020 census
Race	Number	Percent
White	1,830	13.2%
Black or African American	410	3.0%
American Indian and Alaska Native	15	0.1%
Asian	7,035	50.9%
Native Hawaiian and Other Pacific Islander	889	6.4%
Some other race	194	1.4%
Two or more races	3,444	24.9%
Hispanic or Latino (of any race)	1,211	8.8%

=== 2000 census ===
As of the census of 2000, there were 29,371 people, 10,524 households, and 7,514 families residing in the CDP. The population density was 4,972.1 inhabitants per square mile (1,919.7/km^{2}). There were 10,999 housing units at an average density of 1,862.0 per square mile (718.9/km^{2}). The racial makeup of the CDP was 17.08% White, 2.33% African American, 0.26% Native American, 55.32% Asian, 5.63% Pacific Islander, 1.10% from other races, and 18.27% from two or more races. Hispanic or Latino residents of any race were 5.97% of the population.

There were 10,524 households, out of which 29.2% had children under the age of 18 living with them, 55.9% were married couples living together, 11.1% had a female householder with no husband present, and 28.6% were non-families. 21.0% of all households were made up of individuals, and 3.4% had someone living alone who was 65 years of age or older. The average household size was 2.78 and the average family size was 3.26.

In the CDP, 21.4% of the population was under the age of 18, 9.5% was from 18 to 24, 31.5% from 25 to 44, 27.5% from 45 to 64, and 10.1% was 65 years of age or older. The median age was 38 years. For every 100 females, there were 102.6 males. For every 100 females age 18 and over, there were 102.7 males.

The median income for a household in the CDP was $61,210, and the median income for a family was $70,740. Males had a median income of $40,949 versus $32,090 for females. The per capita income for the CDP was $25,913. About 4.1% of families and 5.9% of the population were below the poverty line, including 7.9% of those under age 18 and 3.0% of those age 65 or over.

== Education ==
Waimalu is within the Hawaii Department of Education.

Public elementary schools in the 2010 CDP include Pearl Ridge Elementary School. Three other elementary schools (Momilani, Waimalu, and Waiau Elementary School) were in the Waimalu CDP as of the 2000 U.S. census, but as of the 2010 U.S. census are now in the Pearl City CDP.

Pearl City High School was located in the Waimalu CDP in 2000, but as of 2010 it is in Pearl City CDP.

Our Savior Lutheran School, a K-8 private school, is in the Waimalu CDP.

== Legends ==
There are several geographic legends of Waimalu in the Ewa Area between the East Loch of Pearl Harbor and the terraces in the Waimalu Stream, Waipi Stream which is east of Waiua Pond. Accounts of Heiau, the Waimalu Burial Cave, Paul Marin, and Paunana- loa Huewai-pi, are also included.
