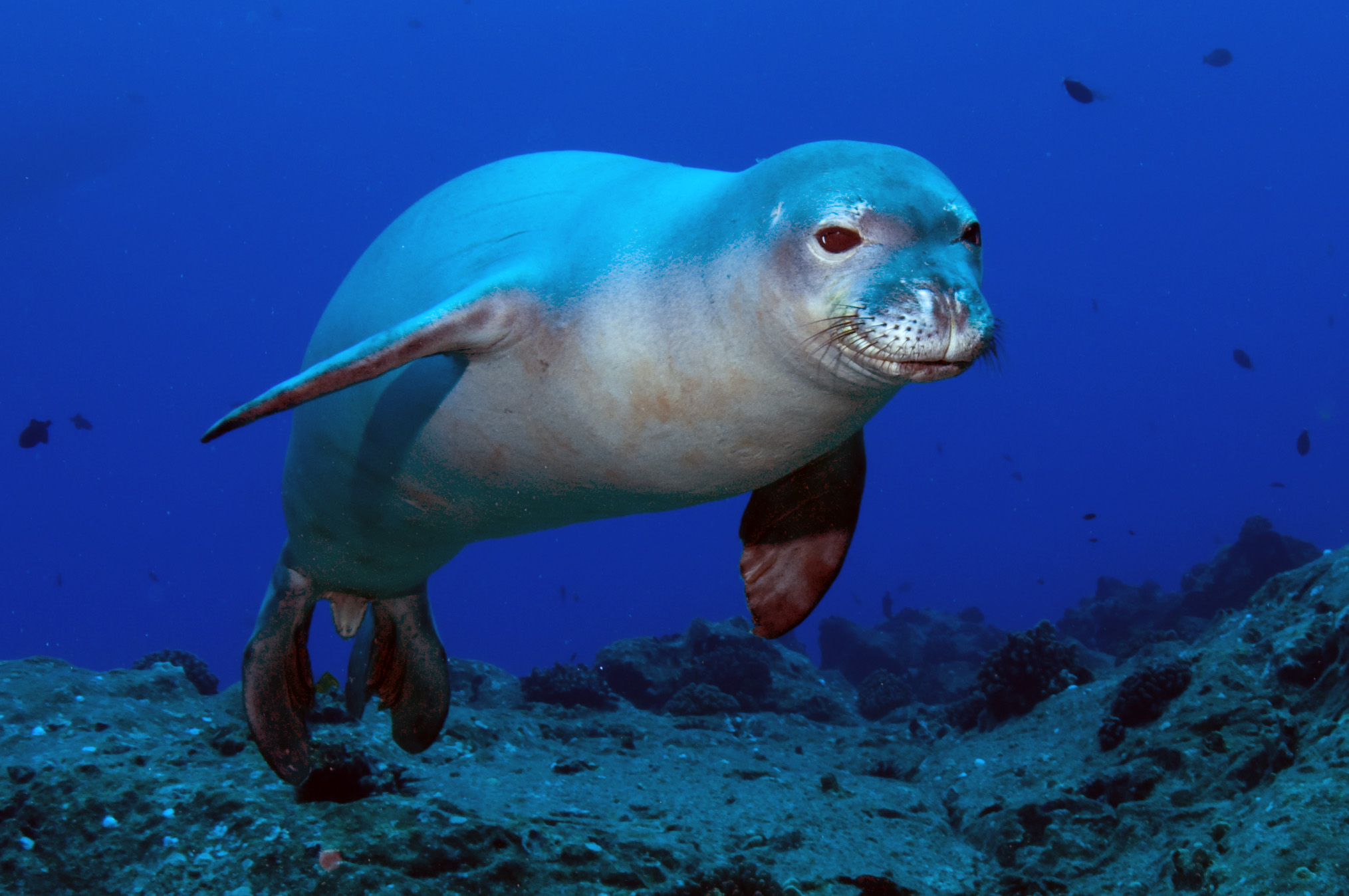
- Hawaiian monk seal, Neomonachus schauinslandi

Scientific classification
- Kingdom: Animalia
- Phylum: Chordata
- Class: Mammalia
- Order: Carnivora
- Parvorder: Pinnipedia
- Family: Phocidae
- Tribe: Monachini
- Genus: Neomonachus; Slater & Helgen, 2014

Type species
- Monachus schauinslandi Matschie, 1905

Species
- N. schauinslandi; †N. tropicalis

= Neomonachus =

Genus of carnivores

Neomonachus is a genus of earless seals, within the family Phocidae. It comprises two species: the endangered Hawaiian monk seal, and the extinct Caribbean monk seal. Prior to 2014, all three species of monk seals were placed in the genus Monachus. Scheel et al. (2014) found that the Caribbean and Hawaiian monk seals were sister species and deeply divergent from the Mediterranean monk seal, and therefore placed them in the newly erected genus Neomonachus.

== Species ==
Image	Scientific name	Common name	Distribution
	N. schauinslandi	Hawaiian monk seal	Hawaiian Islands and United States Minor Outlying Islands, United States
	†N. tropicalis	Caribbean monk seal	Once ranged throughout the Caribbean Sea (in Antigua and Barbuda, the Bahamas, Belize, Costa Rica, Cuba, Dominica, the Dominican Republic, Guadeloupe, Haiti, Honduras, Jamaica, Mexico, Nicaragua, Puerto Rico) and the Southeastern United States; extinct
