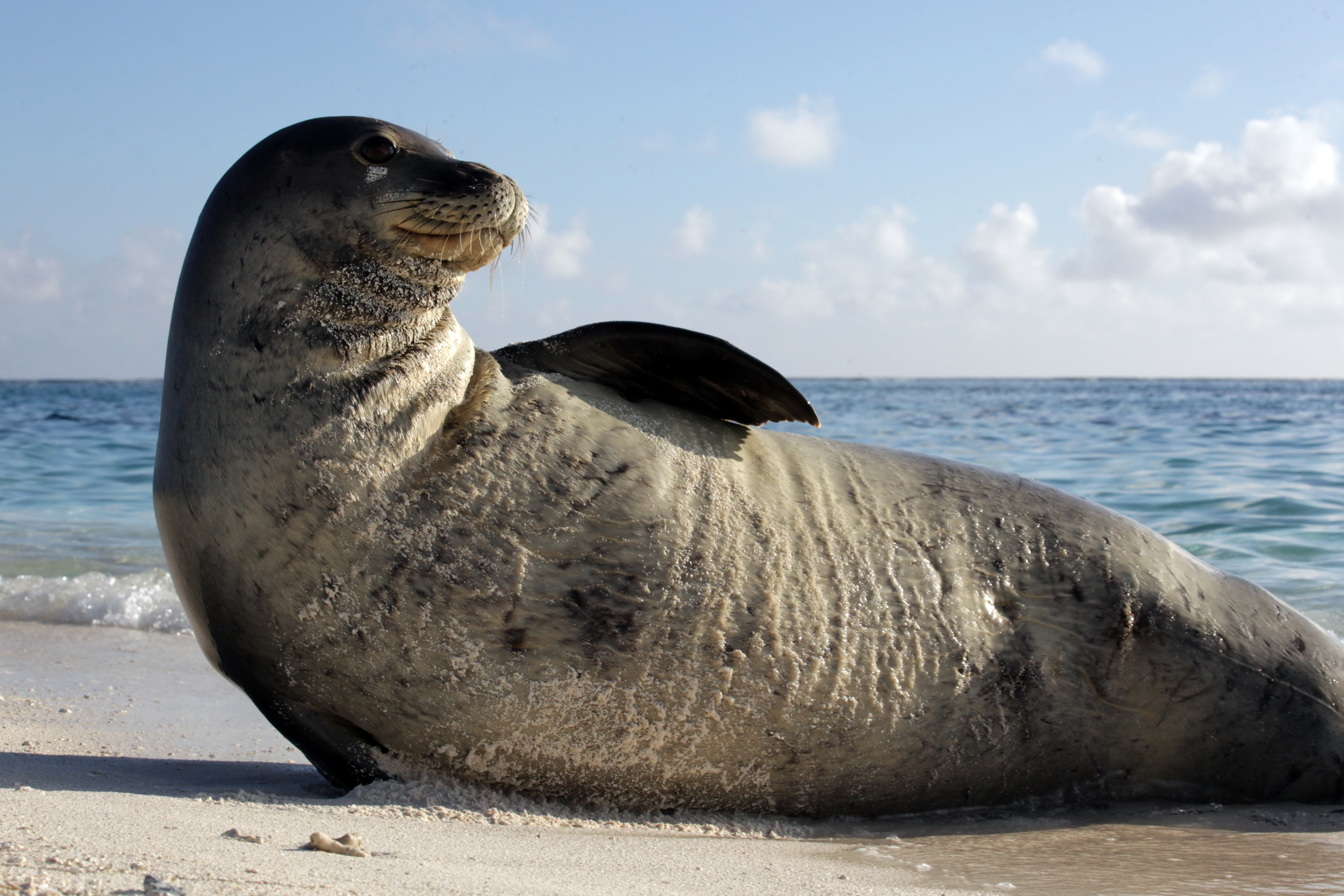

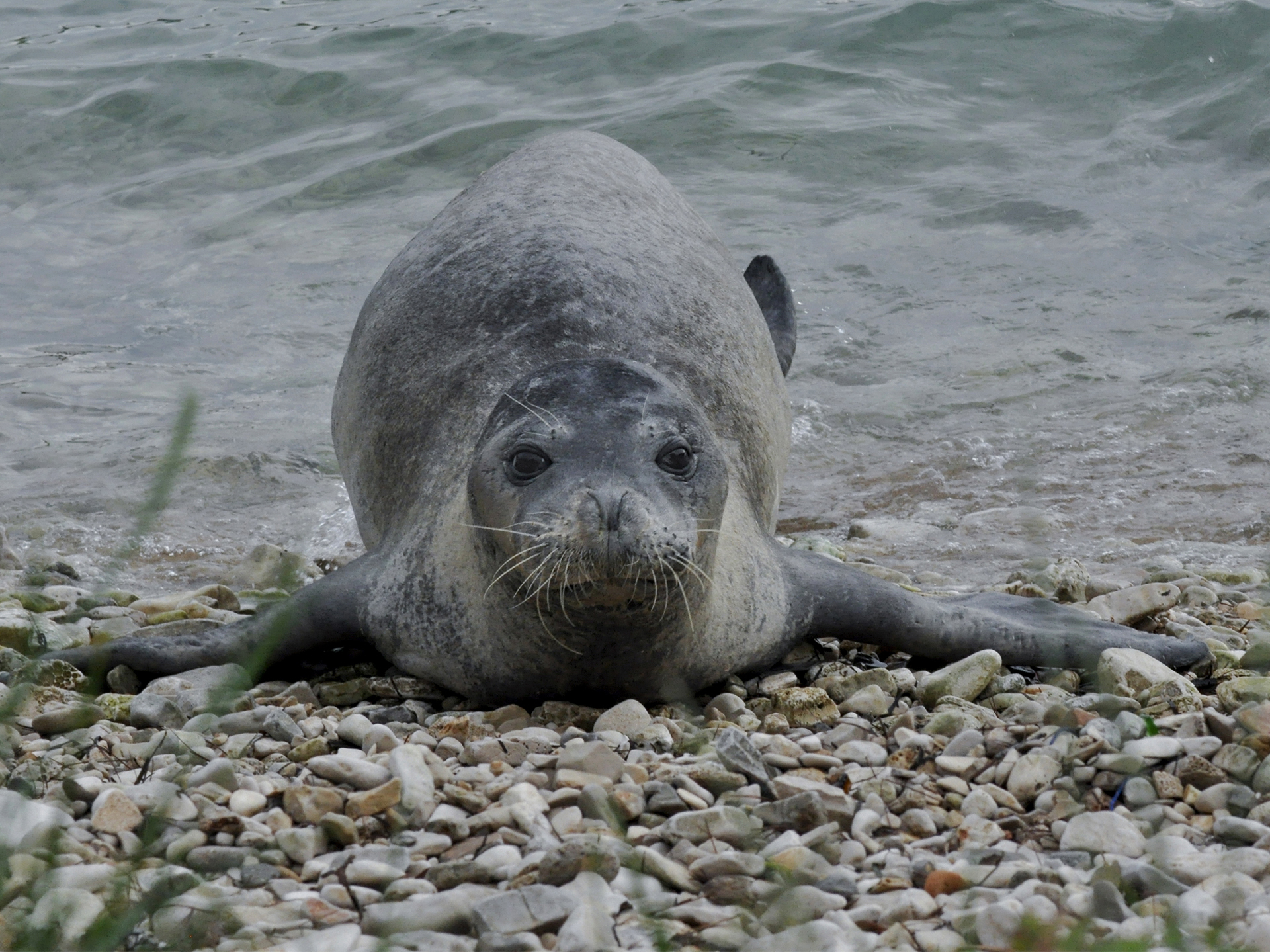
- Hawaiian monk seal (top) and Mediterranean monk seal (bottom)

Scientific classification
- Kingdom: Animalia
- Phylum: Chordata
- Class: Mammalia
- Order: Carnivora
- Parvorder: Pinnipedia
- Family: Phocidae
- Subfamily: Monachinae
- Tribe: Monachini; Scheffer, 1958

Species
- Monachus monachus Neomonachus schauinslandi †Neomonachus tropicalis
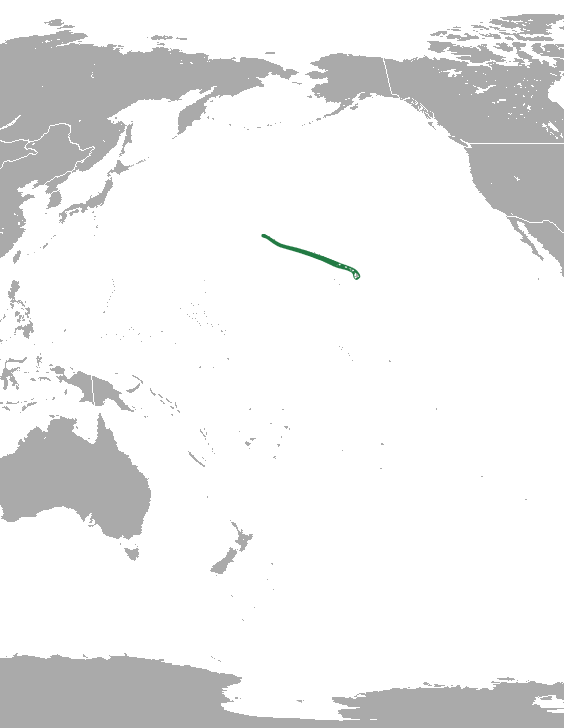
- Hawaiian monk seal range
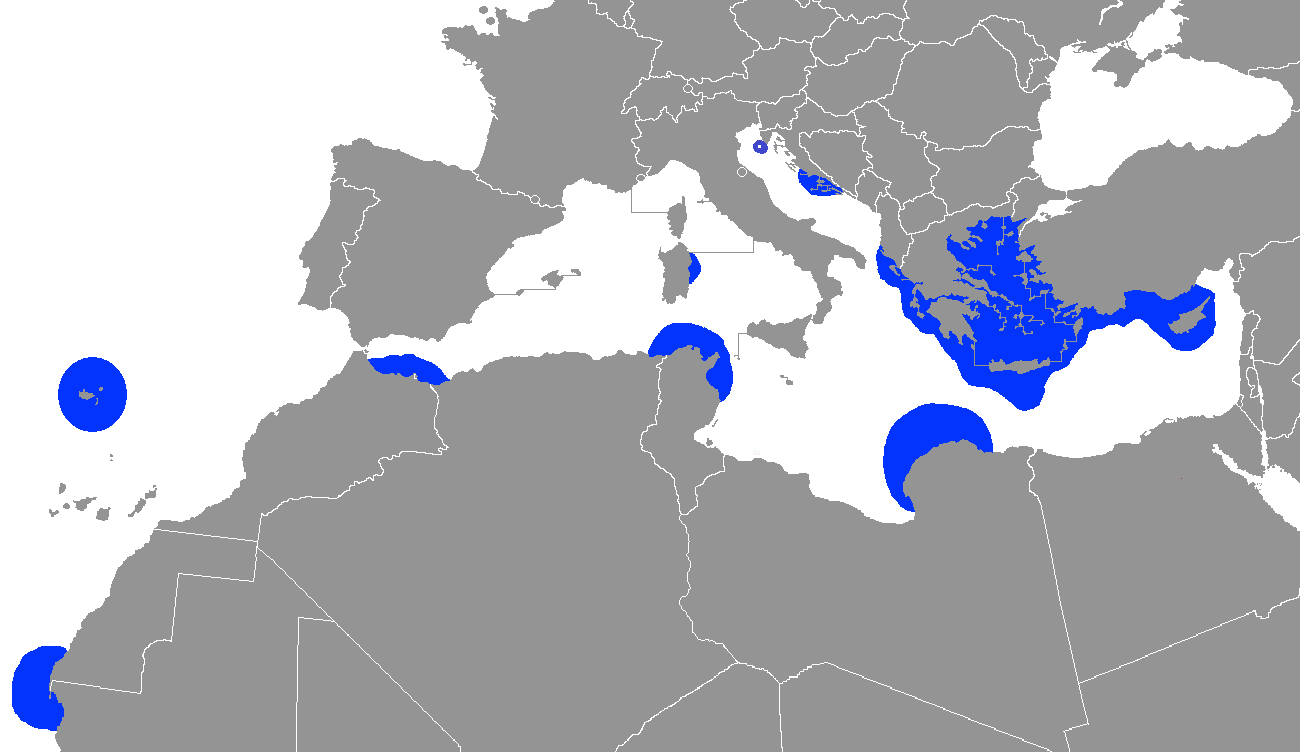
- Mediterranean monk seal range

= Monk seal =

Monk seals

Tribe of earless seals

Monk seals are earless seals of the tribe Monachini. They are the only earless seals found in tropical climates. The two genera of monk seals, Monachus and Neomonachus, comprise three species: the Mediterranean monk seal, Monachus monachus; the Hawaiian monk seal, Neomonachus schauinslandi; and the Caribbean monk seal, Neomonachus tropicalis, which became extinct in the 20th century. The two surviving species are now rare and in imminent danger of extinction. All three monk seal species were classified in genus Monachus until 2014, when the Caribbean and Hawaiian species were placed into a new genus, Neomonachus.

Monk seals have a slender body and are agile. They have a broad, flat snout with nostrils on the top. Polygynous, they group together in harems. They feed mainly on bony fish and cephalopods, but they are opportunistic. Their skin is covered in small hairs, which are generally black in males and brown or dark gray in females. Monk seals are found in the Hawaiian archipelago, certain areas in the east Atlantic and Mediterranean Sea (such as Cabo Blanco and Gyaros island), and formerly in the tropical areas of the west Atlantic Ocean.

All species experienced overhunting by sealers. The Hawaiian monk seal experienced population drops in the 19th century and during World War II, and the Caribbean monk seal was exploited from the 1500s until the 1850s, when populations were too low to hunt commercially. The Mediterranean monk seal has experienced both commercial and illegal hunting since the Middle Ages and has always been threatened with eradication by fishermen. As of 2022, not more than and estimated 600–700 Mediterranean monk seals remain, concentrated primarily along the coasts of Turkey, Cyprus, and Greece. The Hawaiian monk seal appears to be faring somewhat better; the 2021 monk seal population count by the National Oceanic and Atmospheric Association numbered 1,570 animals, an encouraging increase from 1,453 seals in 2019. This marked the first time their population exceeded 1,500 in 20 years; their numbers have been recorded to increase about 2% each year from 2013 to 2021. Some of this population increase undoubtedly is due to numerous rescue-and-release operations and the relocating of weaned pups to quieter beaches (with lower numbers of predatory sharks and fewer human interactions), enabling more seals to mature naturally and safely.

== Etymology ==
The name "monk seal" (German Münchs-robbe) was suggested by naturalist Johann Hermann, who claimed that the seal was popularly known as moine (French for "monk") in Marseille and speculated that the seal looks from behind like a monk wearing a cape and hood.

== Taxonomy and evolution ==
Monk seals are earlesss (true) seals of the tribe Monachini. The tribe was first conceived by Victor Blanchard Scheffer in his 1958 book Seals, Sea Lions, and Walruses: A Review of the Pinnipedia. The two genera of monk seals, Monachus and Neomonachus, comprise three species: the Mediterranean monk seal (Monachus monachus), the Hawaiian monk seal (Neomonachus schauinslandi), and the Caribbean monk seal (N. tropicalis), which became extinct in the 20th century. All three species were classified in genus Monachus until 2014, when comparison of the species' mitochondrial cytochrome b DNA sequences led biologists to place the Caribbean and Hawaiian species in a new genus, Neomonachus.

Fossils of the Mediterranean and Caribbean species are known from the Pleistocene. The time of divergence between the Hawaiian and Caribbean species, 3.7 million years ago (Mya), corresponds to the closing of the Central American Seaway by the formation of the Isthmus of Panama. The divergence between Mediterranean seals and the New World clade was dated to 6.3 Mya ago.

Fossils of a Pliocene species of monk seal, Eomonachus belegaerensis, have been found in Taranaki region of New Zealand. This could possibly place the origins of the group in the Southern Hemisphere. The only other fossil monk seal is Pliophoca etrusca, from the late Pliocene of Italy.

== Habitat ==
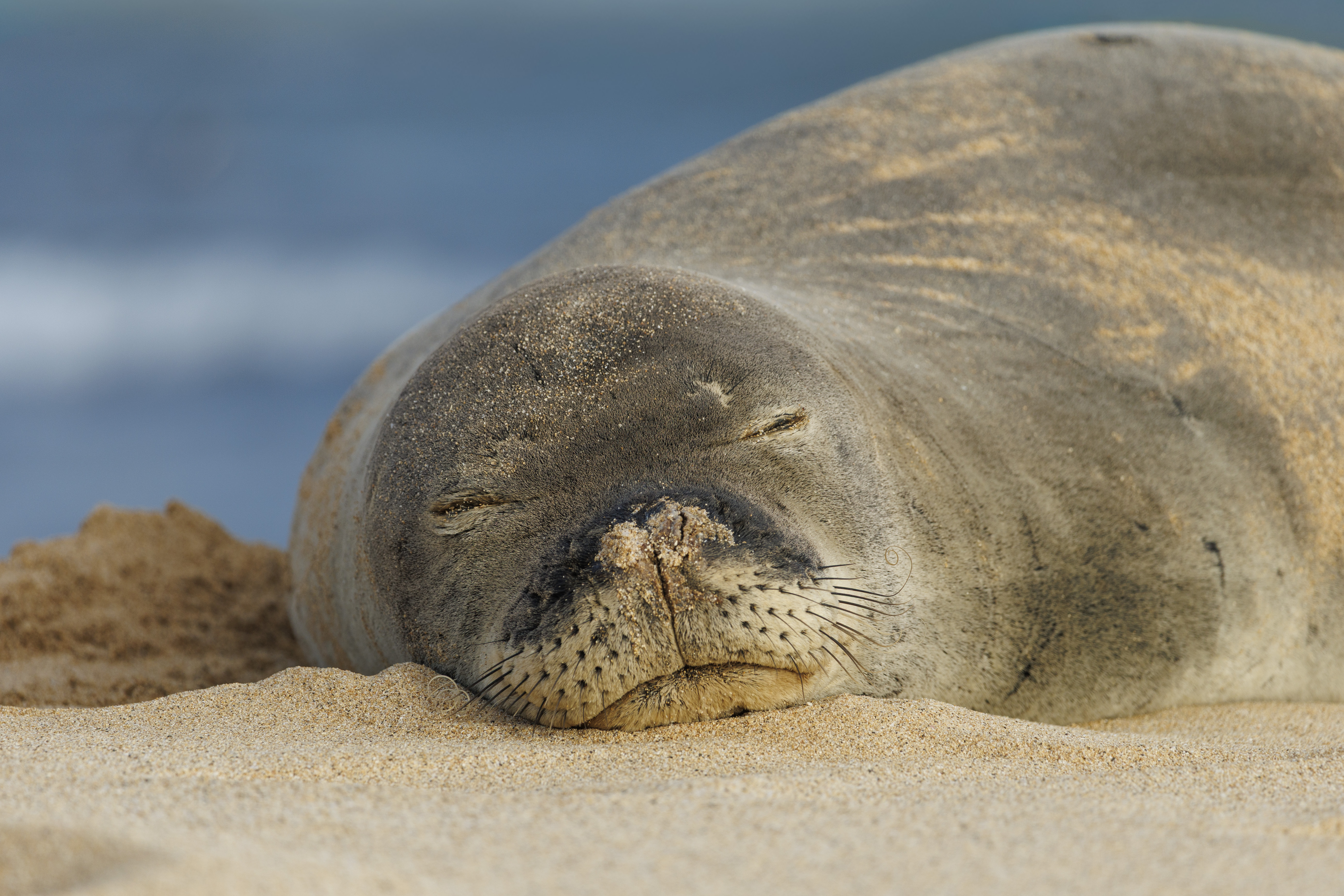
Hawaiian monk seal resting on a beach on Kaua'i.

The Hawaiian monk seal, as its name suggests, lives solely in the Hawaiian archipelago. Monk seals migrated to Hawaii between 4–11 Mya through an open-water passage between North and South America called the Central American Seaway. The Isthmus of Panama closed the seaway 3 Mya. The species may have evolved in the Pacific or Atlantic, but in either case, came to Hawaii long before the first Polynesians. When monk seals are not hunting or eating, they generally bask on the beaches; they tend to bask on sandy beaches and volcanic rock of the Northwest Hawaiian Islands.

The habitat of the Mediterranean monk seal has changed over the years. Prior to the 20th century, they had been known to congregate, give birth, and seek refuge on open beaches. Since sealing had ended, they have left their former habitat and now only use sea caves for such behavior. More often than not, these caves are rather inaccessible to humans due to underwater entries, and because the caves are often along remote or rugged coastlines. Scientists have confirmed this is a recent adaptation, most likely due to the rapid increase in human population, tourism, and industry, which have caused increased disturbance by humans and the destruction of the species' natural habitat. Because of these seals' shy nature and sensitivity to human disturbance, they have slowly adapted to try to avoid contact with humans completely within the last century, and perhaps even earlier. The coastal caves are, however, dangerous for newborns and are causes of major mortality among pups when sea storms hit the caves.

Caribbean monk seals were found in warm temperate, subtropical, and tropical waters of the Caribbean Sea, Gulf of Mexico, and the west Atlantic Ocean. They probably preferred to haul out at sites (low, sandy beaches above high tide) on isolated and secluded atolls and islands, but occasionally visited the mainland coasts and deeper waters offshore. This species may have fed in shallow lagoons and reefs.

== Description ==
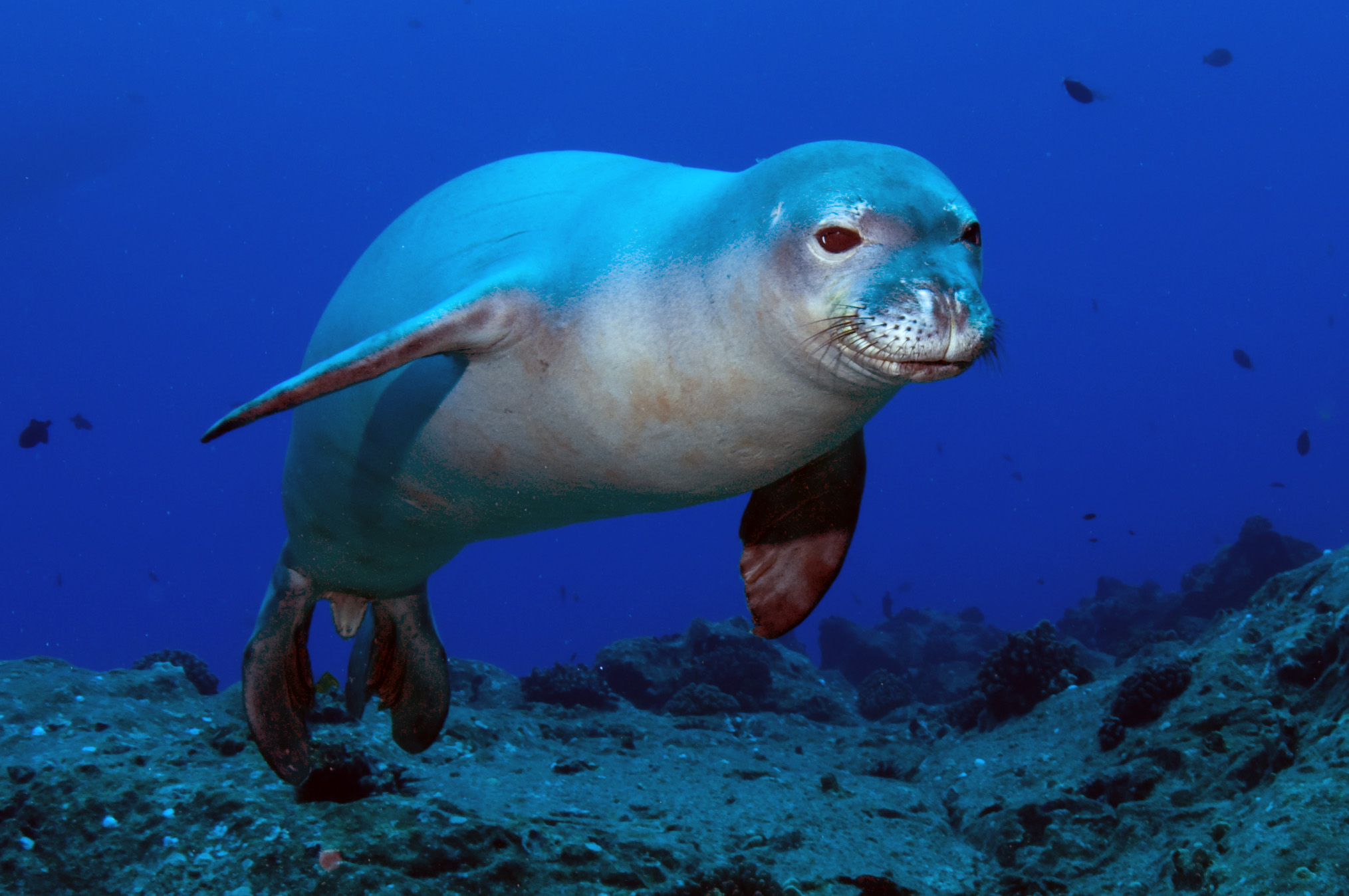
Hawaiian monk seal swimming (note the red eyes are due to the red-eye effect)

Monk seals are part of the family Phocidae (earless seals), the members of which are characterized by their lack of external ears, the inability to rotate their hind flippers under the body, and shed their hair and the outer layer of their skin in an annual molt. Monk seals as a whole vary minutely in size, with all adults measuring on average 8 feet (2.4 m) and 500 pounds (230 kg). They exhibit sexual dimorphism, in that male Mediterranean monk seals are slightly larger than females, while in Hawaiian monk seals, females are larger. Its white belly, gray coat, and slender physique distinguish it from the harbor seal (Phoca vitulina), another earless seal.

The Mediterranean monk seal has a short, broad, and flat snout, with very pronounced, long nostrils that face upwards. The flippers are relatively short, with small, slender claws. The monk seal's physique is ideally suited for hunting its prey - fish, octopus, lobster, and squid in deep-water coral beds. The fur coats of males are generally black, and brown or dark gray in females. Pups are about 3.3 feet (1 m) long and weigh around 33–40 pounds (15–18 kg), their skin being covered by 0.4-to-0.6-inch (1.0 to 1.5 cm) fur, usually dark brown or black. On their bellies, a white stripe occurs, which differs in color between the two sexes. This hair is replaced after 6–8 weeks by the usual short hair adults carry.

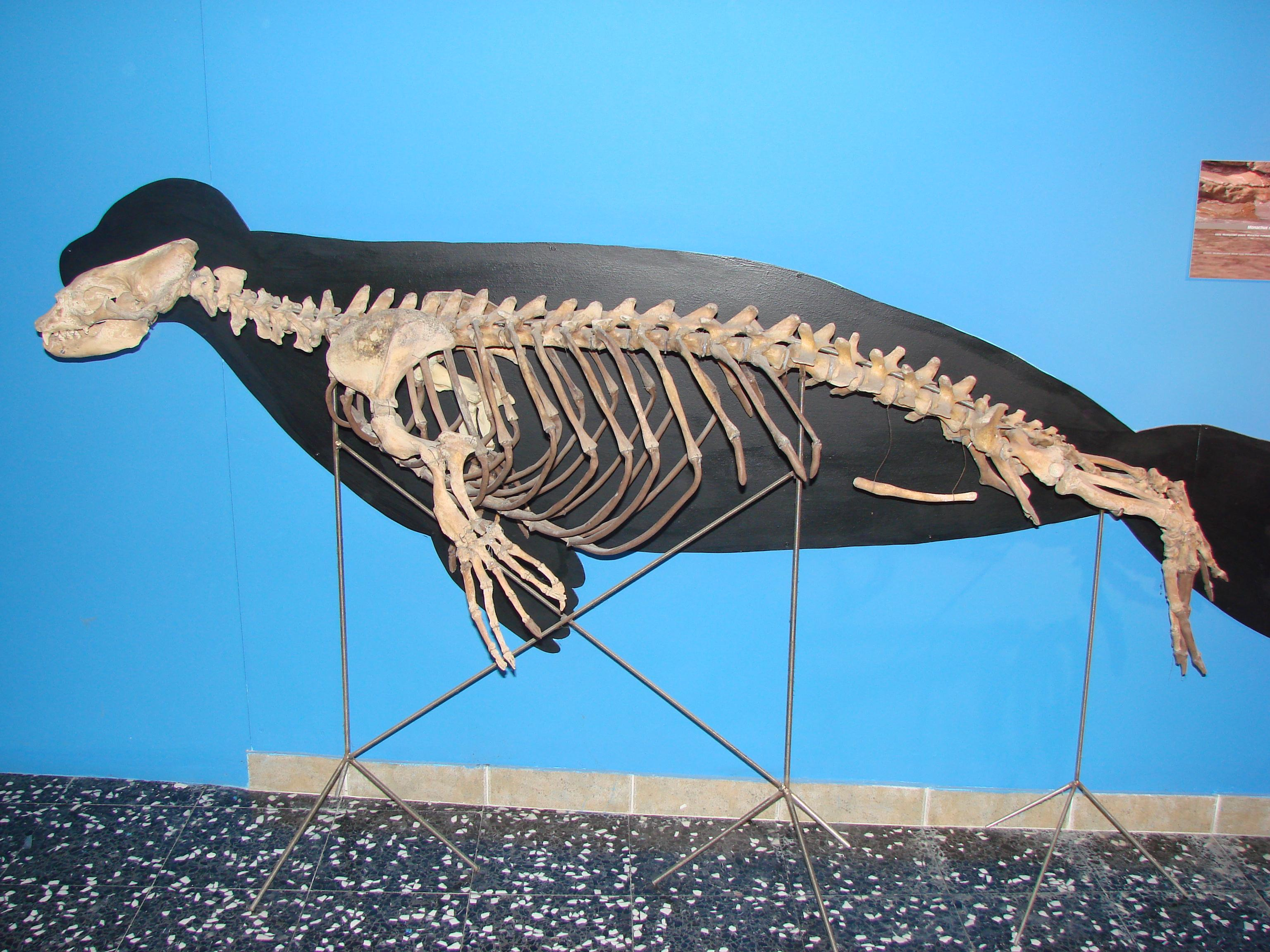
Mediterranean monk seal skeleton

The Hawaiian monk seal (whose Hawaiian name means "the dog that runs in rough waters") has a short, broad, and flat snout, with long nostrils that face forward. It has a relatively small, flat head with large, black eyes, eight pairs of teeth, and a short snout with the nostrils on top of the snout and vibrissae on each side. The nostrils are small, vertical slits, which close when the seal dives under water. Additionally, their slender, torpedo-shaped bodies and hind flippers allow them to be very agile swimmers. Adult males are 300 to 400 pounds (140 to 180 kg) in weight and 7 feet (2.1 m) in length, while adult females tend to be, typically, slightly larger, at 400 to 600 pounds (180 to 270 kg) and 8 feet (2.4 m) in length. When monk seal pups are born, they weigh 30 to 40 pounds (14 to 18 kg) and are 40 inches (1.0 m) in length. As they nurse for about 6 weeks, they grow considerably, eventually weighing between 150 and 200 pounds (68 and 91 kg) by the time they are weaned, while the mother loses up to 300 pounds (140 kg).

Caribbean monk seals had relatively large, long, robust bodies, and could grow to nearly 8 feet (2.4 m) in length and weigh 375 to 600 pounds (170 to 272 kg). Males were probably slightly larger than females, which is similar to Mediterranean monk seals. Like other monk seals, this species had a distinctive head and face. The head was rounded with an extended, broad muzzle. The face had relatively large, wide-spaced eyes, upward-opening nostrils, and fairly big whisker pads with long, light-colored, and smooth whiskers. When compared to the body, the animal's foreflippers were relatively short with little claws and the hindflippers were slender. Their coloration was brownish and/or grayish, with the underside lighter than the dorsal area. Adults were darker than the paler and more yellowish younger seals. Caribbean monk seals were also known to have algae growing on their pelages, giving them a slightly greenish appearance, which is similar to Hawaiian monk seals.

== Behavior ==
=== Diet and predation ===
Hawaiian monk seals mainly prey on reef-dwelling bony fish, but they also prey on cephalopods and crustaceans. Juveniles and subadults prey more on smaller octopus species, such as Octopus leteus and O. hawaiiensis (nocturnal octopus species), and eels than do adult Hawaiian monk seals. Adult seals feed mostly on larger octopus species such as O. cyanea. Hawaiian monk seals have a broad and diverse diet due to foraging plasticity, which allows them to be opportunistic predators that feed on a wide variety of available prey. Tiger sharks, great white sharks, and Galapagos sharks are all predators of the Hawaiian monk seal.

Mediterranean monk seals are diurnal and feed on a variety of fish and mollusks, primarily octopus, squid, and eels, up to 6.5 pounds (2.9 kg) per day. They are known to forage mostly at depths of 150 to 230 feet (46 to 70 m), but some have been observed by NOAA submersibles at a depth of 500 feet (150 m). They prefer hunting in wide-open spaces, enabling them to use their speed more effectively. They are successful bottom-feeding hunters; some have even been observed lifting slabs of rock in search of prey. They have no natural predators.

=== Reproduction and development ===
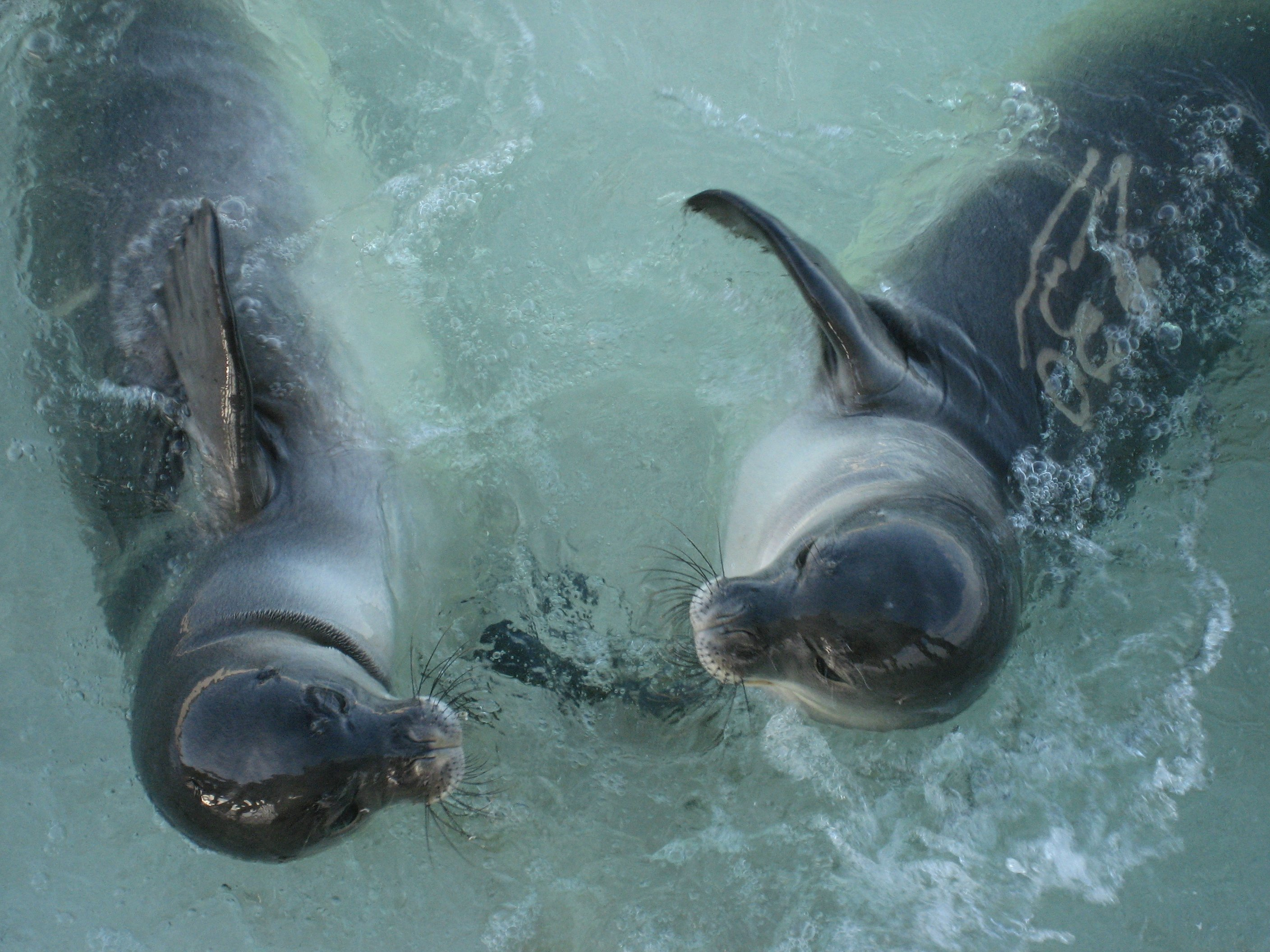
Two young Hawaiian monk seals

Very little is known of the Mediterranean monk seal's reproduction. They are thought to be polygynous, with males being very territorial where they mate with females. Although no breeding season exists, since births take place year round, a peak occurs in October and November. This is also the time when caves are prone to wash out due to high surf or storm surge, which causes high mortality rates among pups, especially at the key Cabo Blanco colony. Pups make first contact with the water 2 weeks after their birth and are weaned around 18 weeks of age; females caring for pups go off to feed for an average of 9 hours. Most individuals are believed to reach maturity at 4 years of age. The gestation period lasts close to a year. However, monk seals of the Cabo Blanco colony may have a gestation period lasting slightly longer than a year. Mediterranean monk seals generally live to be 25 to 30 years old.

Hawaiian monk seals are polygynous. The breeding season takes place throughout the year, excluding the fall, but peaks during April and May. Shark attacks cause a high pup mortality, from 19% to 39%. Pups are thought to be weaned around 6 weeks and reach sexual maturity at 3 years. Their typical lifespan is 25 to 30 years.

Not much is known of the Caribbean monk seal's reproduction. They likely bore a single pup every two years. Their gestation period, lactation period, and sexual maturity age are unknown.

== Interactions with humans ==
=== Hawaii ===
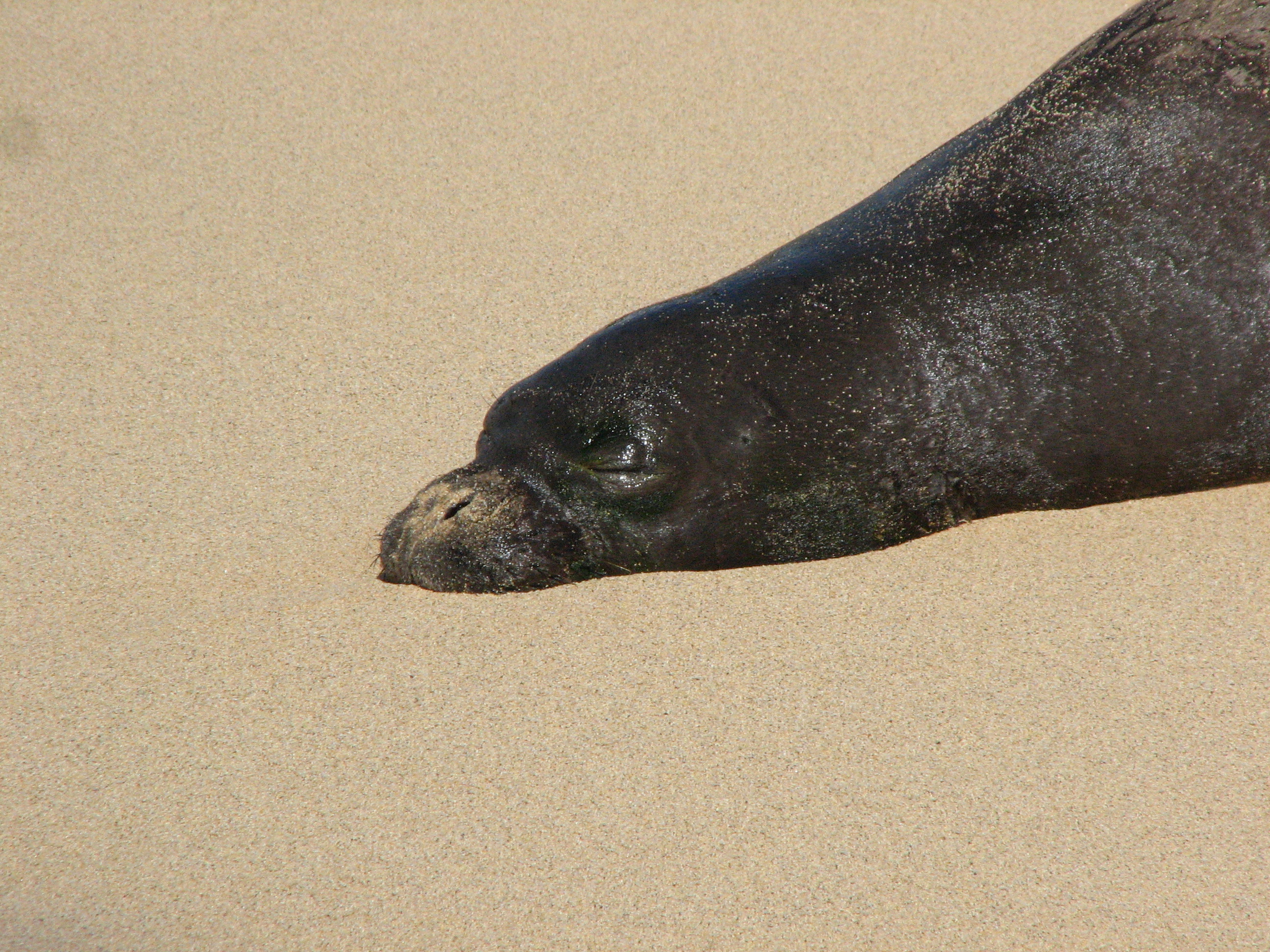
Hawaiian monk seal sleeping on a beach in Kauai

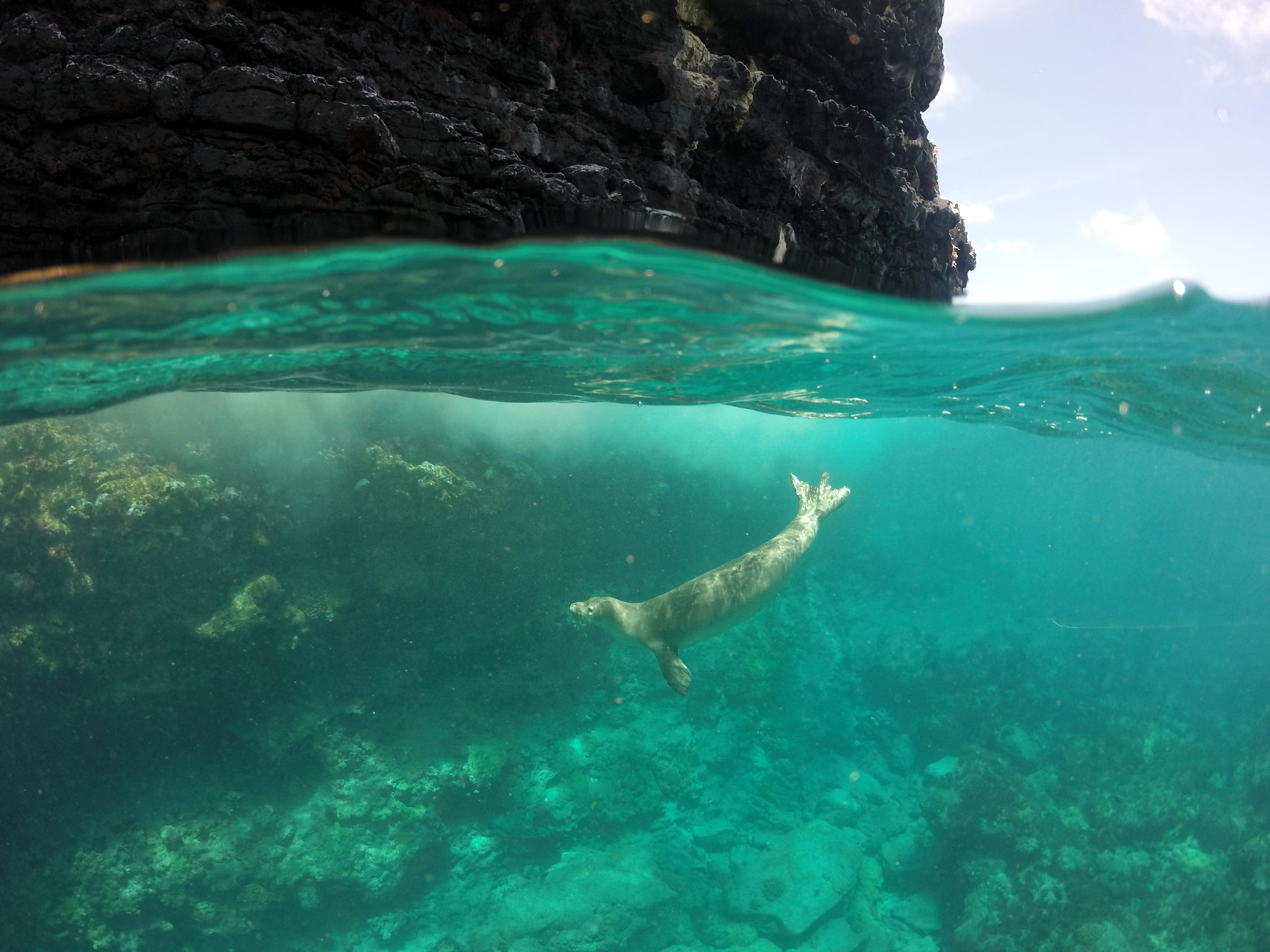
Hawaiian monk seal swimming above a coral reef

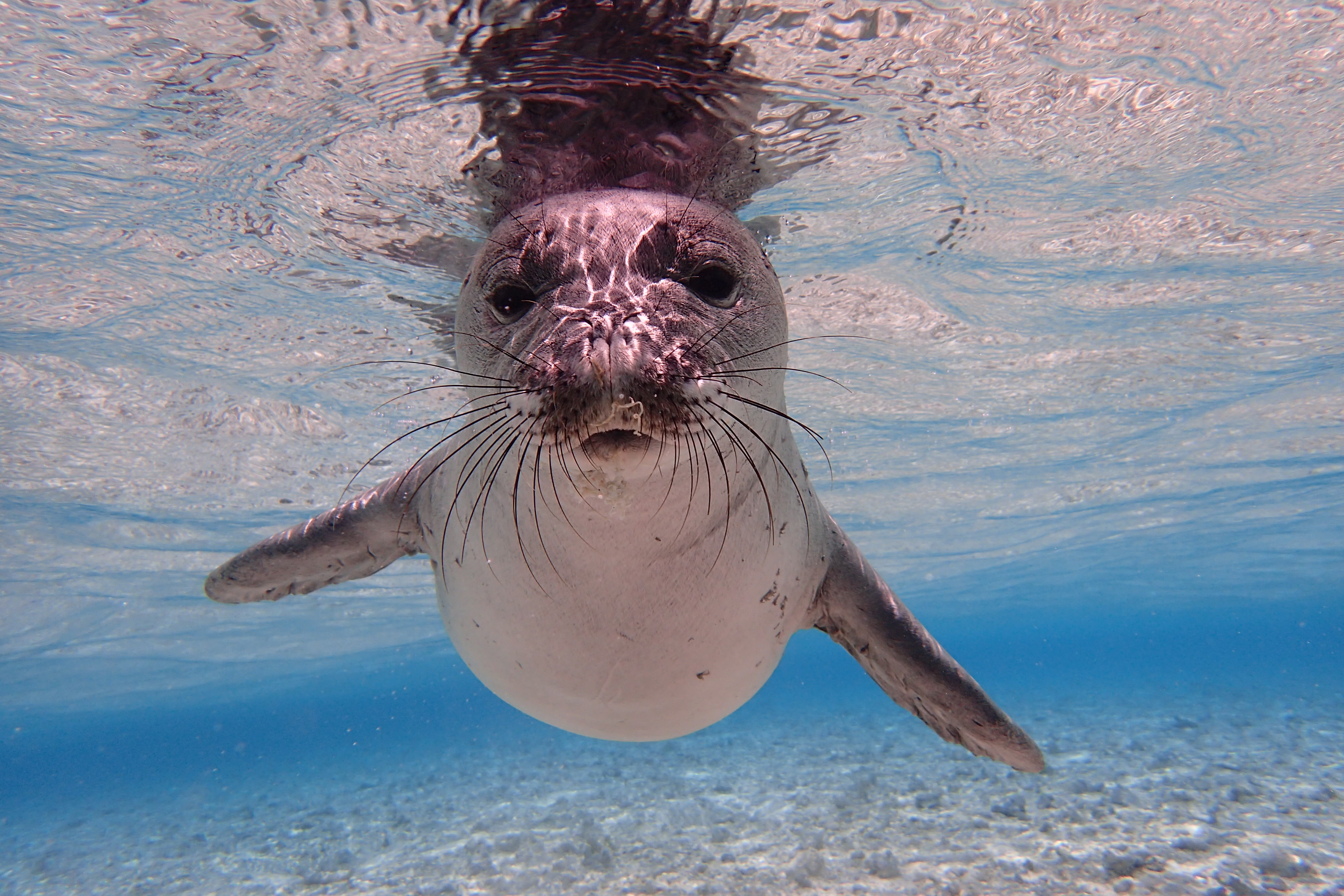
Young monk seal underwater

==== Threats ====
In the 19th century, many seals were killed by whalers and sealers for meat, oil, and skin. U.S. military forces hunted them during World War II, while occupying Laysan Island and Midway Island. Human disturbances have had immense effects on the populations of the Hawaiian monk seal. They tend to avoid beaches where they are disturbed; after continual disturbance, the seals may completely abandon the beach, thus reducing habitat size, subsequently limiting population growth. For instance, large beach crowds and beach structures limit the seal's habitat. The WWII military bases in the northwestern islands were closed, but minimal human activities can be enough to disturb the species. The current population is only around 1,400 individuals.

The Hawaiian monk seal has the lowest level of genetic variability among the 18 pinniped species, allegedly due to a population bottleneck caused by intense hunting in the 19th century. This limited genetic variability reduces the species's ability to adapt to environmental pressures and limits natural selection, thus increasing their risk of extinction. Given the monk seal's small population, the effects of disease could be disastrous.

Entanglement can result in mortality, because when the seals get trapped in marine debris such as fishing nets, they cannot maneuver or reach the surface to breathe. Marine fisheries can potentially interact with monk seals by direct and indirect relationships. Directly, the seal can become snared by fishing equipment, entangled in discarded debris, and even feed on fish refuse. International law prohibits the intentional discarding of debris from ships at sea. Monk seals have one of the highest documented rates of entanglement of any pinniped species.

==== Conservation ====
In 1909, Theodore Roosevelt created the Hawaiian Islands National Wildlife Refuge (HINWR), which is under the jurisdiction of the U.S. Fish and Wildlife Service. Throughout the 1980s, the National Marine Fisheries Service completed various versions of an environmental impact statement that designated the Northwest Hawaiian Islands as a critical habitat for the Hawaiian monk seal. The designation prohibited lobster fishing in the northwest Hawaiian Islands and Laysan Island. In 2006, a Presidential proclamation established the Papahanaumokuakea Marine National Monument, which incorporated the Northwestern Hawaiian Islands Coral Reef Ecosystem Reserve, the Midway Atoll National Wildlife Refuge, the HINWR, and the Battle of Midway National Memorial, thus creating the largest marine protected area in the world and affording the Hawaiian monk seal further protection.

NOAA cultivated a network of volunteers to protect the seals while they bask or bear and nurse their young. NOAA is funding considerable research on seal population dynamics and health in conjunction with the Marine Mammal Center. From NOAA, several programs and networks were formed. Community programs such as PIRO have helped to improve community standards for the Hawaiian monk seal. The program also creates networks with the native Hawaiians on the island to network more people in the fight for conservation of the seals. The Marine Mammal Response Network is partnered with NOAA and several other government agencies that deal with land and marine wildlife.

To raise awareness of the species' plight, on June 11, 2008, a state law designated the Hawaiian monk seal as Hawaii's official state mammal.

=== Mediterranean ===
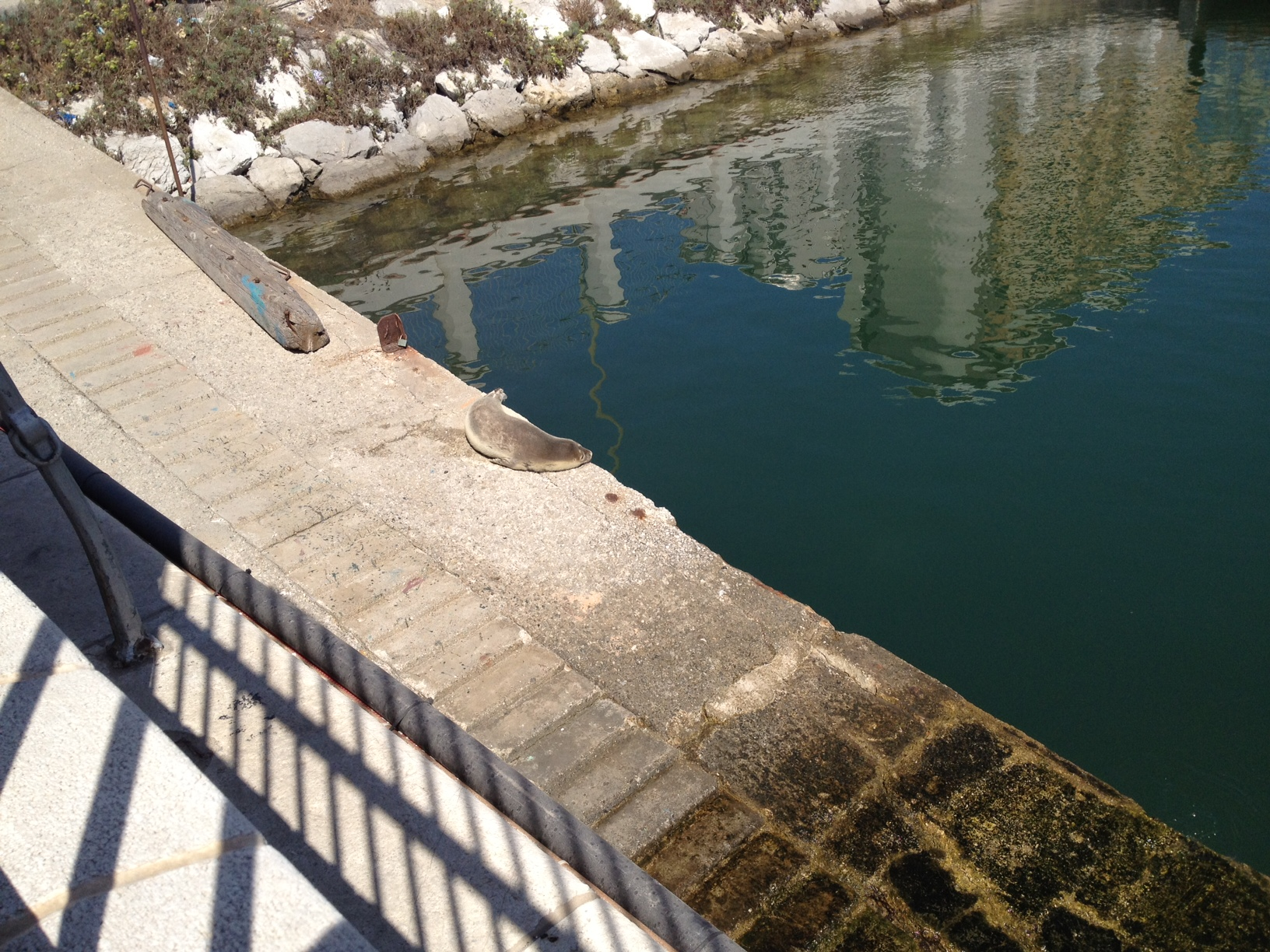
One of the first sightings of a monk seal in the Strait of Gibraltar, 2012

==== Threats ====
Several causes provoked a dramatic population decrease over time: on one hand, commercial hunting (especially during the Roman Empire and Middle Ages) and during the 20th century, eradication by fishermen, who used to consider it a pest due to the damage the seal causes to fishing nets when it preys on fish caught in them; and on the other hand, coastal urbanization and pollution. Currently, its entire population is estimated to be less than 600 individuals scattered throughout a wide distribution range, which qualifies this species as endangered. Its current very sparse population is one more serious threat to the species, as it only has two key sites that can be deemed viable. One is the Aegean Sea (250–300 animals in Greece, with the largest concentration of animals on Gyaros, and some 100 in Turkey); the other important subpopulation is the Western Saharan portion of Cabo Blanco (around 200 individuals which may support the small, but growing, nucleus in the Desertas Islands – roughly 20 individuals). Some individuals may be using coastal areas along other parts of Western Sahara, such as in Cintra Bay. These two key sites are virtually in the extreme opposites of the species' distribution range, which makes natural population interchange between them impossible. All the other remaining subpopulations are composed of less than 50 mature individuals, many of them being only loose groups of extremely reduced size – often less than five individuals. Consequently, low genetic variability exists.

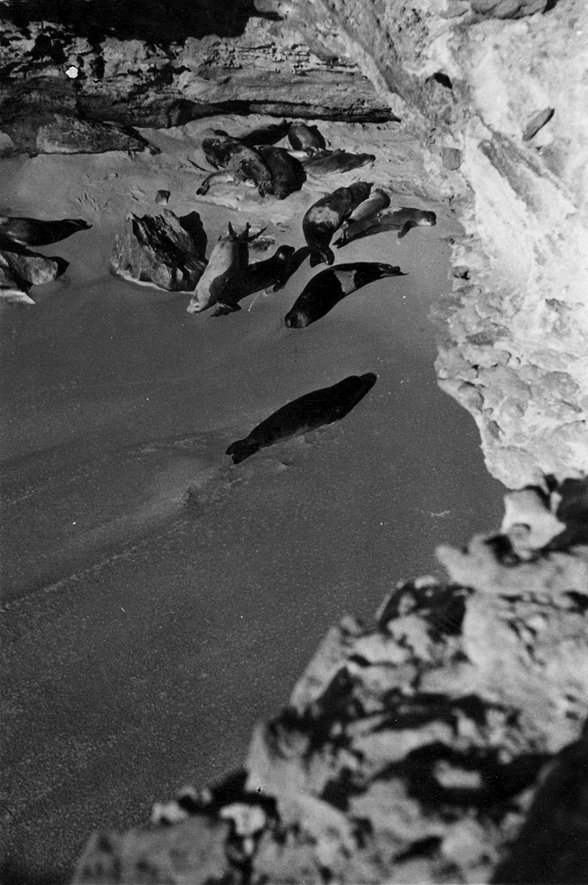
A colony of Mediterranean monk seals on Cabo Blanco, 1945

Cabo Blanco, in the Atlantic Ocean, is the largest surviving single population of the species, and the only remaining site that still seems to preserve a colony structure. In the summer of 1997, a disease killed more than 200 animals (two-thirds of its population) within 2 months, extremely compromising the species' viable population. While opinions on the precise causes of this epidemic remain divided, the most likely cause is a morbillivirus or a toxic algae bloom.

==== Conservation ====
In the Aegean Sea, Greece has allocated a large area for the preservation of the Mediterranean monk seal and its habitat. The Greek Alonissos Marine Park, that extends around the Northern Sporades islands, is the main action ground of the Greek MOm organisation. MOm is greatly involved in raising awareness in the general public, fundraising for the helping of the monk seal preservation cause, in Greece and wherever needed. Greece is currently investigating the possibility of declaring another monk seal breeding site as a national park, and also has integrated some sites in the NATURA 2000 protection scheme. The legislation in Greece is very strict towards seal hunting, and in general, the public is very much aware and supportive of the effort for the preservation of the Mediterranean monk seal.

One of the largest groups among the foundations concentrating their efforts towards the preservation of the Mediterranean monk seal is the Mediterranean Seal Research Group (Akdeniz Foklarını Araştırma Grubu) operating under the Underwater Research Foundation (Sualtı Araştırmaları Derneği) in Turkey (also known as SAD-AFAG). The group has taken initiative in joint preservation efforts together with the Foça municipal officials, as well as phone, fax, and email hotlines for sightings.

=== Caribbean ===
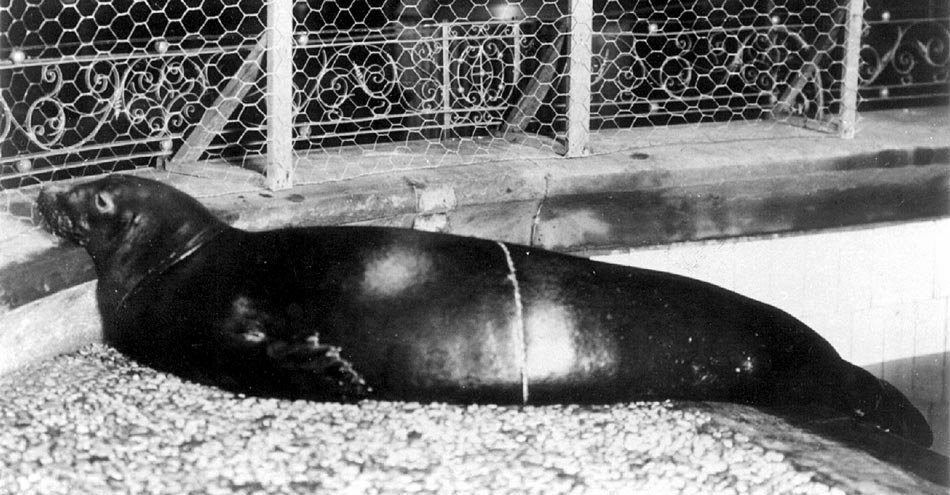
Caribbean monk seal in the New York Aquarium, 1910

The extinction of the Caribbean monk seal was mainly triggered by overhunting in the eighteenth and nineteenth centuries to obtain the oil held within their blubber, fueled by the large demand for seal products. As early as 1688, sugar plantation owners sent out hunting parties to kill hundreds of seals every night for blubber oil to lubricate machinery. The Caribbean monk seals' docile nature and lack of an instinctive fear of humans made it an easy target, and hunting only ended (in the 1850s) because the population was too low for commercial use. Overfishing of the reefs that sustained the Caribbean monk seal population also contributed to their extinction. Fish stock decline in the Caribbean starved the remaining populations. Little was done to protect the Caribbean monk seal; by the time it was placed on the endangered species list in 1967, it was likely already extinct.
