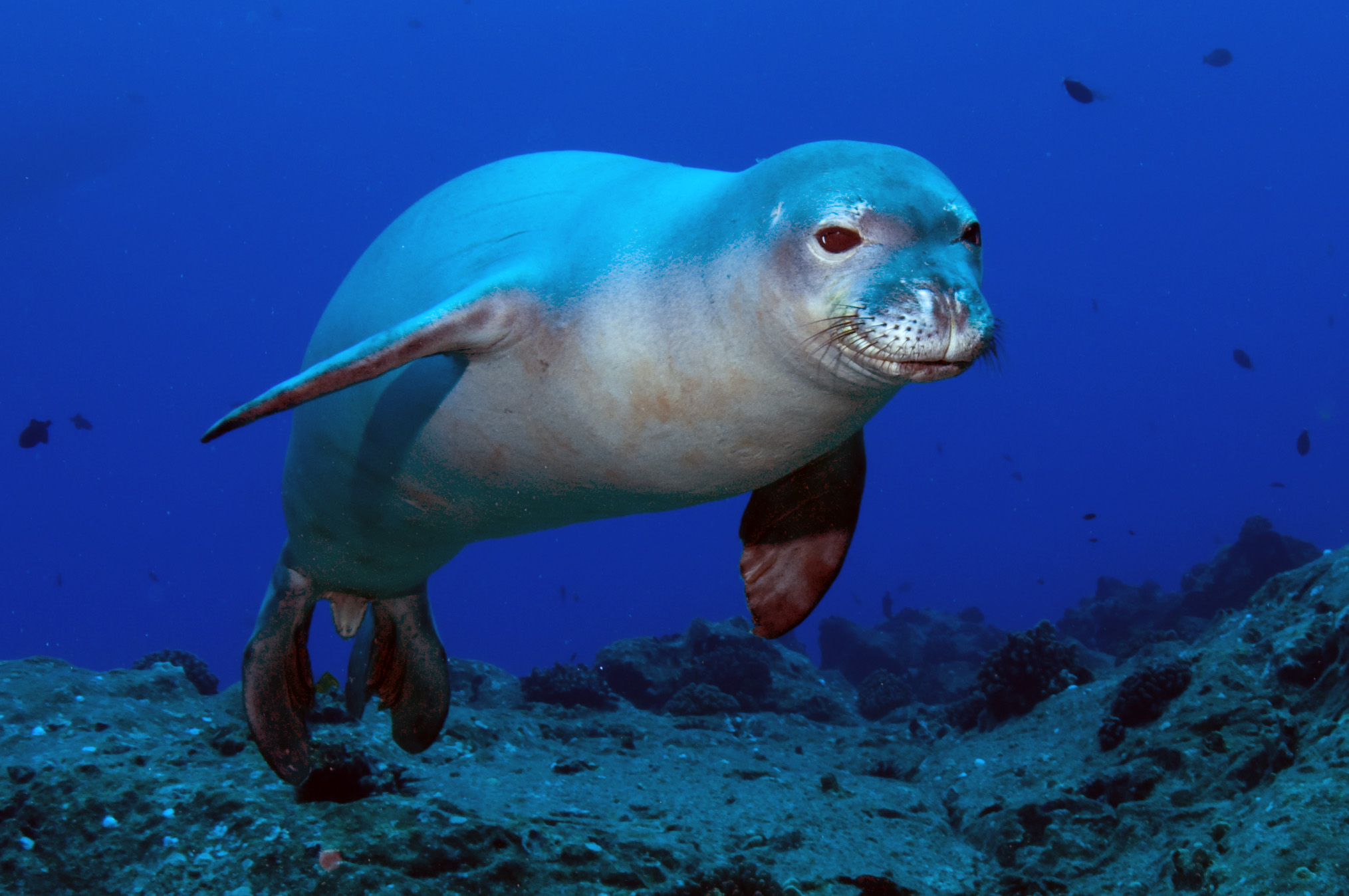
- Hawaiian monk seal at Kaʻula

Conservation status
- Vulnerable (IUCN 3.1)

Scientific classification
- Kingdom: Animalia
- Phylum: Chordata
- Class: Mammalia
- Order: Carnivora
- Parvorder: Pinnipedia
- Family: Phocidae
- Genus: Neomonachus
- Species: N. schauinslandi

Binomial name
- Neomonachus schauinslandi (Matschie, 1905)
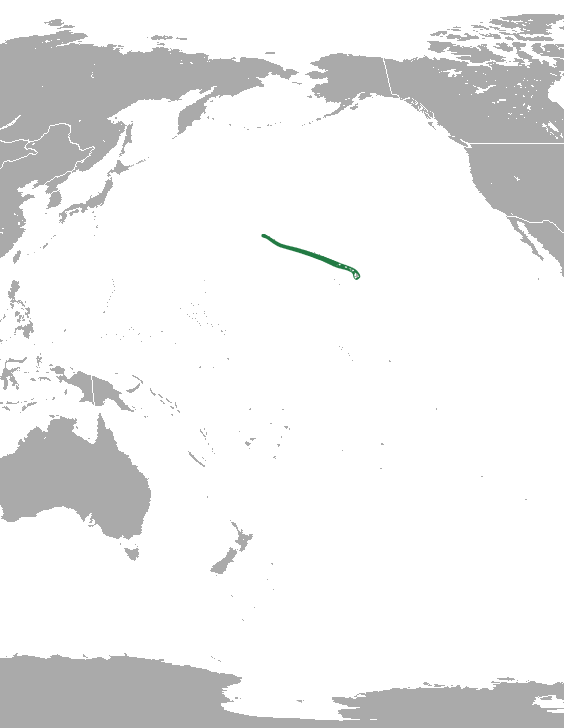
- Hawaiian monk seal range

Synonyms
- Monachus schauinslandi Matschie, 1905

= Hawaiian monk seal =

Species of carnivore

The Hawaiian monk seal (Neomonachus schauinslandi) is a vulnerable species of earless seal in the family Phocidae that is endemic to the Hawaiian Islands.

The Hawaiian monk seal is one of two extant monk seal species; the other is the Mediterranean monk seal. A third species, the Caribbean monk seal, is extinct. It is the last living member of the genus Neomonachus.

The Hawaiian monk seal is the only seal native to Hawaii, and, along with the Hawaiian hoary bat, is one of only two mammals endemic to the islands.

N. schauinslandi is a conservation reliant species. The small population of about 1,400 individuals is threatened by human encroachment, very low levels of genetic variation, entanglement in fishing nets, marine debris, disease, and past commercial hunting for skins. There are many methods of conservation biology when it comes to endangered species; translocation, captive care, habitat cleanup, and educating the public about the Hawaiian monk seal are some of the methods that can be employed.

== Etymology ==
Known to native Hawaiians as ʻīlio-holo-i-ka-uaua, or "dog that runs in rough water", its scientific name is from Hugo Schauinsland, a German scientist who discovered a skull on Laysan Island in 1899. Its common name, and the genus (first element) of its scientific name, comes from short hairs on its head, said to resemble a monk. It is the official state mammal of Hawaii.

== Description ==
Its grey coat, white belly, and slender physique distinguish them from the distantly related harbor seal (Phoca vitulina). The monk seal's physique is ideal for hunting its prey: fish, lobster, octopus and squid in deep water coral beds. When it is not hunting and eating, it generally basks on the sandy beaches and volcanic rock of the Northwest Hawaiian Islands.

The Hawaiian monk seal is part of the earless seal family Phocidae, being named so for its characteristic lack of external ears and inability to rotate its hind flippers under the body. The Hawaiian monk seal has a relatively small, flat head with large black eyes, eight pairs of teeth, and short snouts with the nostril on top of the snout and vibrissae on each side. The nostrils are small vertical slits which close when the seal dives underwater. Additionally, their slender, torpedo-shaped body and hind flippers allow them to be very agile swimmers.

Adult males are 300 to 400 pounds (140 to 180 kilograms) in weight and 7 feet (2.1 meters) in length while adult females tend to be, on average, significantly larger, at 400 to 600 lb (180 to 270 kg) and 8 ft (2.4 m) in length. When monk seal pups are born, they average 30 to 40 lb (14 to 18 kg) and 40 in (1 m) in length. As they nurse for approximately six weeks, they grow considerably, eventually weighing between 150 and 200 lb (70 and 90 kg) by the time they are weaned, while the mother loses up to 300 lb (140 kg).

Monk seals, like elephant seals, shed their hair and the outer layer of their skin in an annual catastrophic molt. During the most active period of the molt, about 10 days for the Hawaiian monk seal, the seal remains on the beach. The hair, generally dark gray on the dorsal side and lighter silver ventrally, gradually changes color through the year with exposure to atmospheric conditions. Sunlight and seawater cause the dark gray to become brown and the light silver to become yellow-brown, while long periods of time spent in the water can also promote algae growth, giving many seals a green tinge. The juvenile coat of the monk seal, manifest in a molt by the time a pup is weaned is silver-gray; pups are born with black pelage. Many Hawaiian monk seals sport scars from shark attacks or entanglements with fishing gear. Maximum life expectancy is 25 to 30 years.

== Evolution and migration ==
Hauled-out seal at the PMNM

The monk seals are members of the Phocidae. In an influential 1977 paper, Repenning and Ray proposed, based on certain unspecialized features, that they were the most primitive living seals. However, this idea has since been entirely superseded.

In an effort to inform the public and conserve the seals, the National Oceanic Atmospheric Administration (NOAA) Fisheries Service developed a historical timeline to demonstrate that the Hawaiian islands has been home to the seals for millions of years and that the seals belong there. Evidence points to monk seals migrating to Hawaii between 4–11 million years ago (mya) through an open water passage between North and South America called the Central American Seaway. The Isthmus of Panama closed the Seaway approximately 3 million years ago.

Berta and Sumich ask how this species came to the Hawaiian Islands when its closest relatives are on the other side of the world in the North Atlantic and Mediterranean Sea. The species may have evolved in the Pacific or Atlantic, but in either case, came to Hawaii long before the first Polynesians.

== Ecology ==
=== Habitat ===
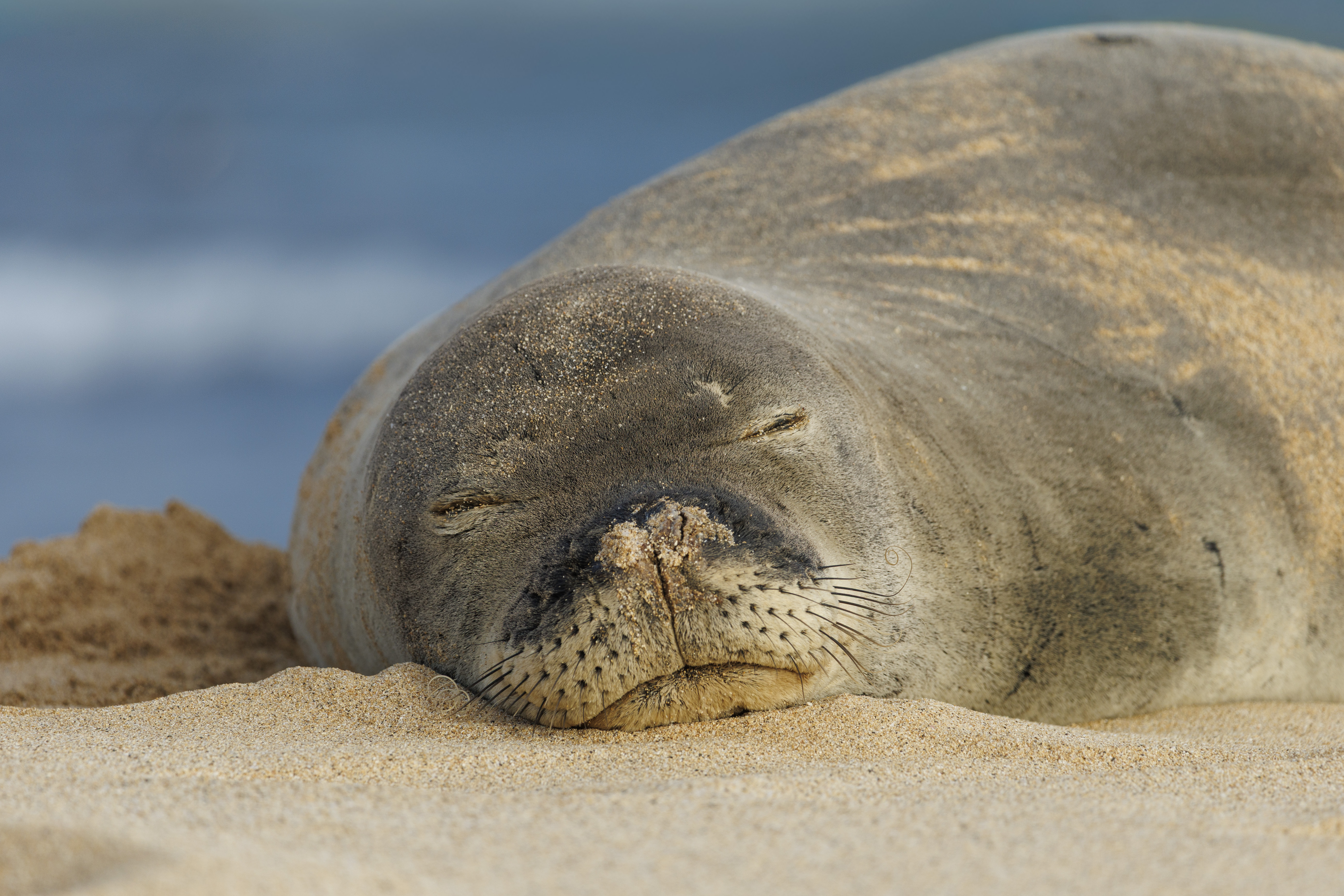
A Hawaiian monk seal resting on a beach on Kauaʻi

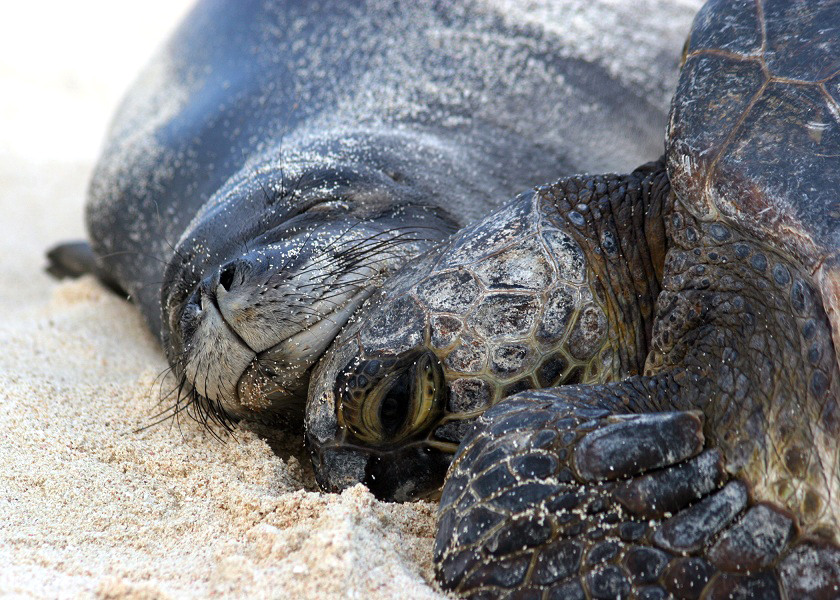
Monk seal with green sea turtle at Papahānaumokuākea Marine National Monument

The majority of the Hawaiian monk seal population can be found around the Northwest Hawaiian Islands but a small and growing population lives around the main Hawaiian Islands. These seals spend two-thirds of their time at sea. Monk seals spend much of their time foraging in deeper water outside of shallow lagoon reefs at sub-photic depths of 300 metres (160 fathoms) or more. Hawaiian monk seals breed and haul-out on sand, corals, and volcanic rock; sandy beaches are more commonly used for pupping. Due to the immense distance separating the Hawaiian Islands from other land masses capable of supporting the Hawaiian monk seal, its habitat is limited to the Hawaiian Islands.

=== Feeding ===
Hawaiian monk seals mainly prey on reef dwelling bony fish, but they also prey on cephalopods and crustaceans. They appear to prefer fish belonging to the families Muraenidae, Labridae, Holocentridae, Balistidae, and Polymixiidae. Both juveniles and sub-adults prey more on smaller octopus species, such as Octopus leteus and O. hawaiiensis, nocturnal octopus species, and eels than the adult Hawaiian monk seals, while adult seals feed mostly on larger octopus species such as O. cyanea. Hawaiian monk seals have a broad and diverse diet due to foraging plasticity which allows them to be opportunistic predators that feed on a wide variety of available prey.

Hawaiian monk seals can hold their breath for up to 20 minutes and dive more than 550 m (1,800 ft); however, they usually dive an average of 6 minutes to depths of less than 60 m (200 ft) to forage at the seafloor.

=== Predators ===
Tiger sharks, great white sharks and Galapagos sharks are the main predators of the Hawaiian monk seal.

== Behavior ==
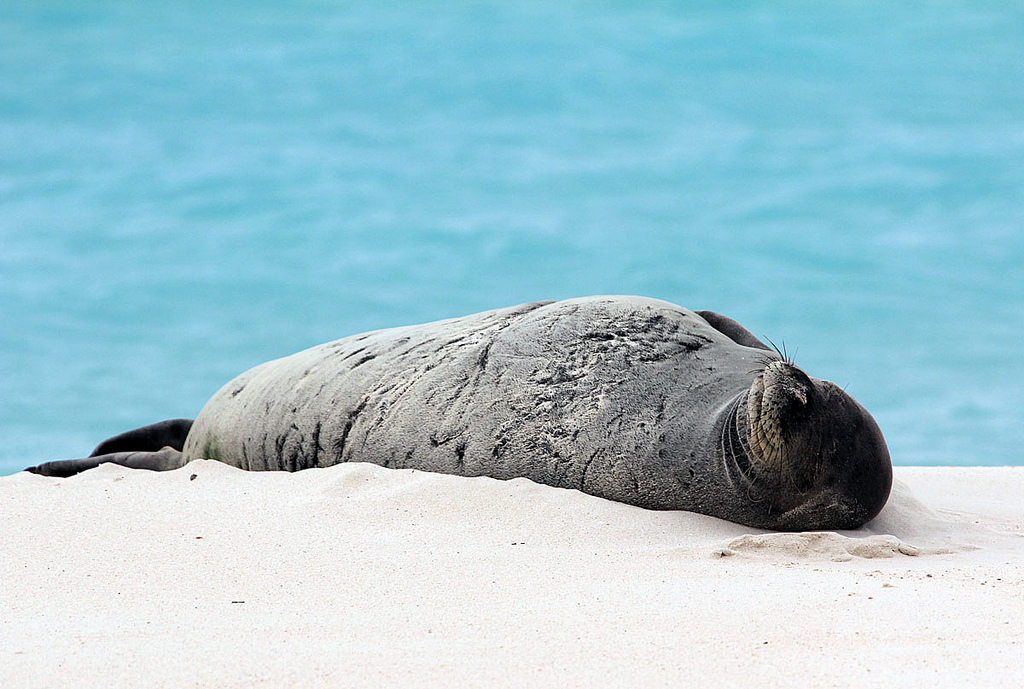
Resting on sands at Midway Atoll National Wildlife Refuge

=== Reproduction ===
Hawaiian monk seals mate in the water during their breeding season, which occurs between June and August. Females reach maturity at age four and give birth to one pup a year. The fetus takes nine months to develop, with birth occurring between March and June. Pups start around 16 kg (35 lb) and are about 1 m (3 ft 3 in) long.

=== Nursing ===
The pups are born on beaches and nursed for about six weeks. The mother does not eat or leave the pup while nursing. After that time, the mother deserts the pup, leaving it on its own, and returns to the sea to forage for the first time since the pup's arrival.

== Status ==
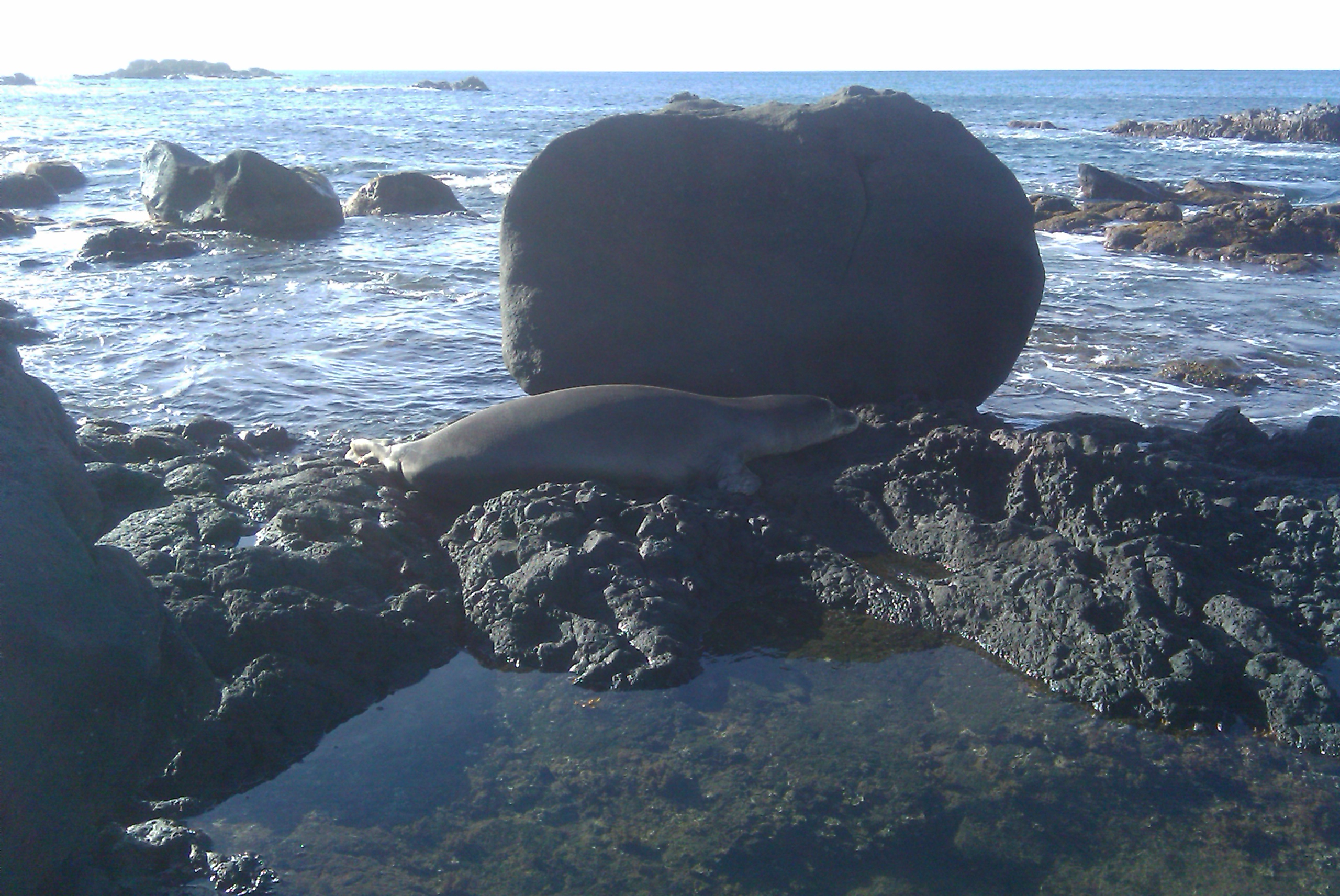
A Hawaiian monk seal observed on the North Shore of Oʻahu, near Waimea Bay

Most seals are found on the Northwestern Hawaiian Islands.

The Hawaiian monk seal is endangered, although its cousin species, the Mediterranean monk seal (M. monachus), is even rarer, and the even more closely related Caribbean monk seal (N. tropicalis), last sighted in the 1950s, was officially declared extinct in June 2008. In 2010, it was estimated that only 1100 individuals remained. A later estimate in 2016, which included a more complete survey of small populations, was approximately 1400 individuals.

Seals nearly disappeared from the main islands, but the population has begun to recover. The growing population there was approximately 150 as of 2004 and 300 as of 2016. Individuals have been sighted in surf breaks and on beaches in Kauaʻi, Niʻihau and Maui. Community volunteers on Oʻahu have made many anecdotal blog reports of sightings around the island since 2008. In early June 2010, two seals hauled out on Oʻahu's popular Waikīkī beach. Seals have hauled out at Oʻahu's Turtle Bay, and again beached at Waikīkī on March 4, 2011, by the Moana Hotel. Another Monk Seal appeared at Punaluʻu Black Sands Beach in July 2023. Yet another adult came ashore for a rest next to the breakwater in Kapiʻolani Park Waikīkī on the morning of December 11, 2012, after first being spotted traveling west along the reef break from the Aquarium side of the Park. On June 29, 2017 monk seal #RH58 popularly known as "Rocky" gave birth to a pup on Kaimana Beach fronting Kapiʻolani Park. Despite the fact Kaimana beach is popular and busy, Rocky has been routinely hauling out on this beach for several years. In 2006, twelve pups were born in the main islands, rising to thirteen in 2007, and eighteen in 2008. As of 2008 43 pups had been counted in the main islands.

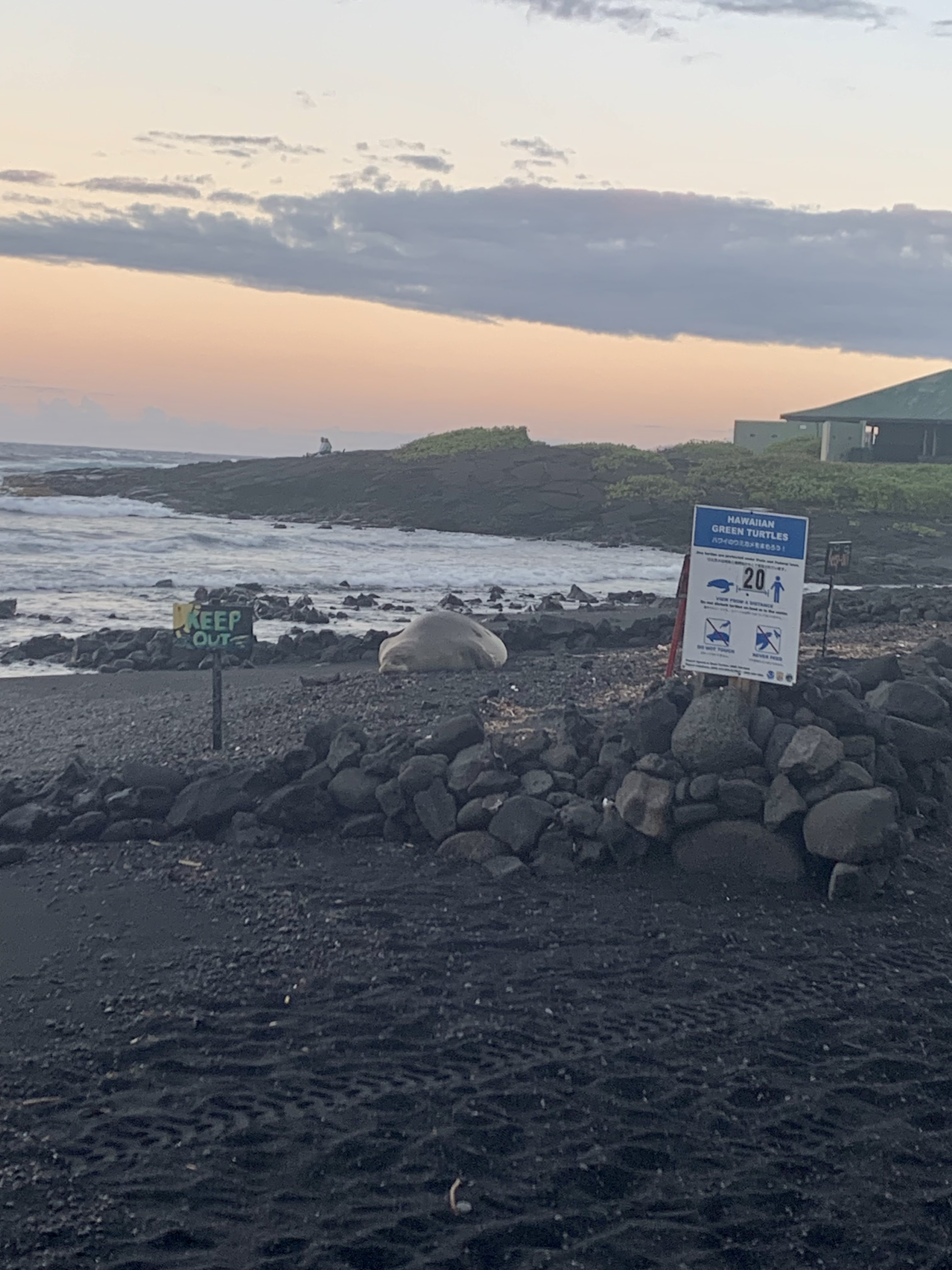
Hawaiian Monk Seal resting at Punalu’u Black Sands Beach in July 2023

The Hawaiian monk seal was officially designated as an endangered species on November 23, 1976, and is now protected by the Endangered Species Act and the Marine Mammal Protection Act. It is illegal to kill, capture or harass a Hawaiian monk seal. Even with these protections, human activity along Hawaii's fragile coastlines (and in the world at large) still provides many stressors.

As of 2024 the IUCN downgraded the Hawaiian monk seal from Endangered to Vulnerable due to an increase in its population.

=== Threats ===
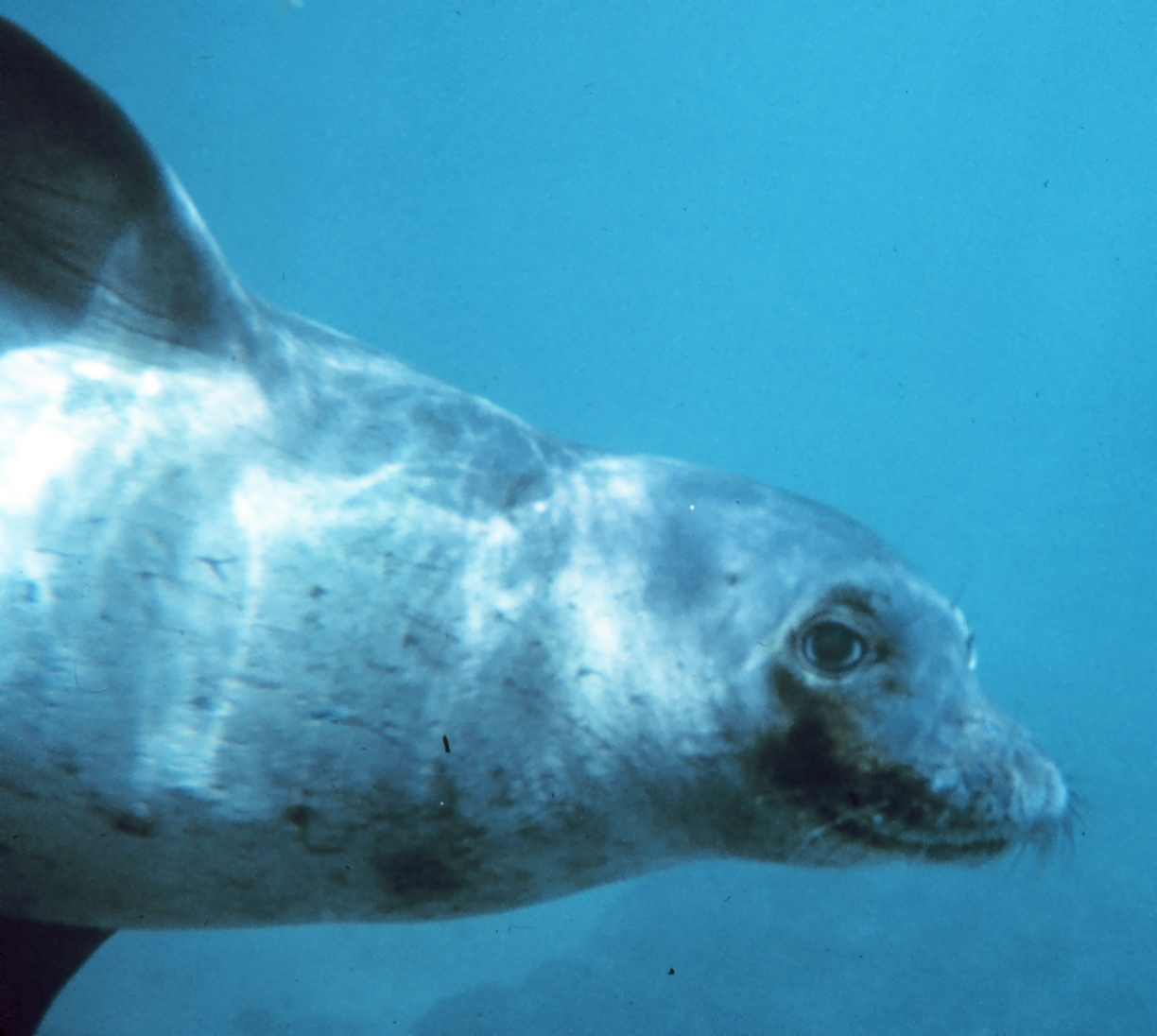
Hawaiian monk seal

Natural factors threatening the Hawaiian monk seal include low juvenile survival rates, reduction of habitat/prey associated with environmental changes, increased male aggression, and subsequent skewed gender ratios. Anthropogenic or human impacts include hunting (during the 1800s and 1900s) and the resulting small gene pool, continuing human disturbance, entanglement in marine debris, and fishery interactions.

==== Natural threats ====
Low juvenile survival rates continue to threaten the species. High juvenile mortality is due to starvation and marine debris entanglement. Another contributor to the low juvenile survival rates is predation from sharks, including tiger sharks. Most mature monk seals bear scars from shark encounters, and many such attacks have been observed.

Reduced prey abundance can lead to starvation, with one cause being reduction in habitat associated with environmental change. Habitat is shrinking due to erosion in the Northwest Hawaiian Islands, reducing the size of islands/beaches. Lobsters, the seals' preferred food other than fish, have been overfished. Competition from other predators such as sharks, jacks, and barracudas leaves little for developing pups. The creation of Papahānaumokuākea Marine National Monument which encloses these islands may expand food supplies.

Mobbing is a practice among the seals that involves multiple males attacking one female in mating attempts. Mobbing is responsible for many deaths, especially to females.

Mobbing leaves the targeted individual with wounds that increase vulnerability to sepsis, killing the victim via infection. Smaller populations were more likely to experience mobbing as a result of the higher male/female ratio and male aggression. Unbalanced sex-ratios were more likely to occur in slow-growing populations.

Postmortem examinations of some seal carcasses revealed gastric ulcerations caused by parasites. Some of the infectious diseases that pose a threat to the Hawaiian monk seal populations include distemper viruses, West Nile Virus, Leptospira spp., and Toxoplasma gondii. Protozoal-related mortality, specifically due to toxoplasmosis, are becoming a great threat to the recovery of the endangered Hawaiian monk seal and other native Hawaiian marine life.

==== Anthropogenic impacts ====
In the nineteenth century, large numbers of seals were killed by whalers and sealers for meat, oil and skin. U.S. military forces hunted them during World War II, while occupying Laysan Island and Midway.

The Hawaiian monk seal has the lowest level of genetic variability among the 18 phocid species. This low genetic variability was allegedly due to a population bottleneck caused by intense hunting in the 19th century. This limited genetic variability reduces the species ability to adapt to environmental pressures and limits natural selection, thus increasing their risk of extinction. Given the monk seal's small population, the effects of disease could be disastrous.

Monk seals can be affected by the toxoplasmosis pathogen in cat feces that enters the ocean in polluted runoff and wastewater, a new phenomenon. Since 2001, toxoplasmosis has killed at least eleven seals. Other human-introduced pathogens, including leptospirosis, have infected monk seals.

Human disturbances have had immense effects on the populations of the Hawaiian monk seal. Monk seals tend to avoid beaches where they are disturbed; after continual disturbance the seal may completely abandon the beach, thus reducing its habitat size, subsequently limiting population growth. For instance, large beach crowds and beach structures limit the seal's habitat. Although the WWII military bases in the northwestern islands were closed, minimal human activities can be enough to disturb the species.

Marine fisheries can potentially interact with monk seals via direct and indirect relationships. Directly the seal can become snared by fishing equipment, entangled in discarded debris, and even feed on fish refuse. Although international law prohibits the intentional discarding of debris from ships at sea, entanglement still results in mortality because the seals get trapped in unintentional marine debris such as fishing nets and cannot maneuver or even reach the surface to breathe. Monk seals have one of the highest documented rates of entanglement of any pinniped species.

=== Conservation ===
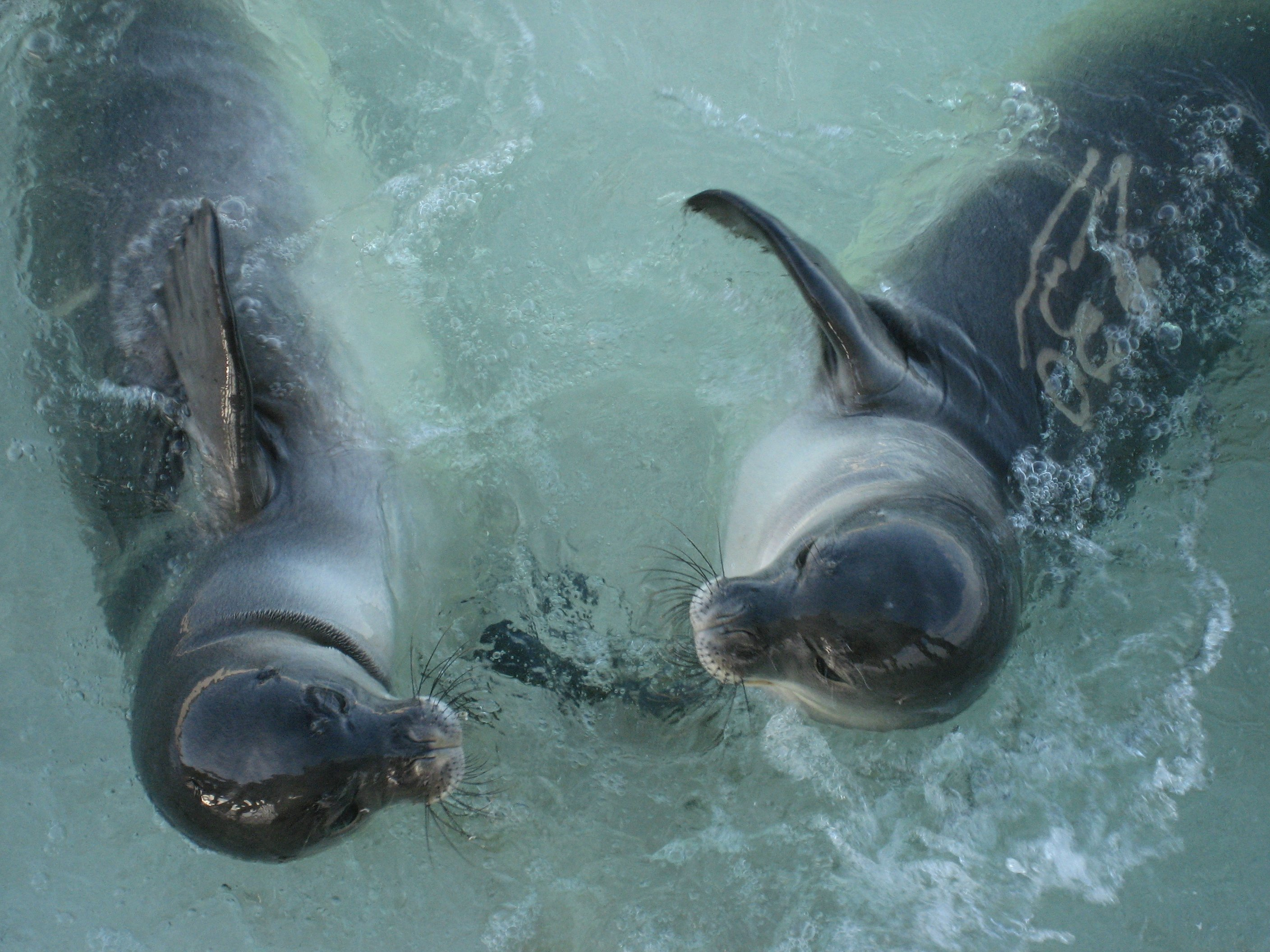
Seal pups at Papahānaumokuākea Marine National Monument

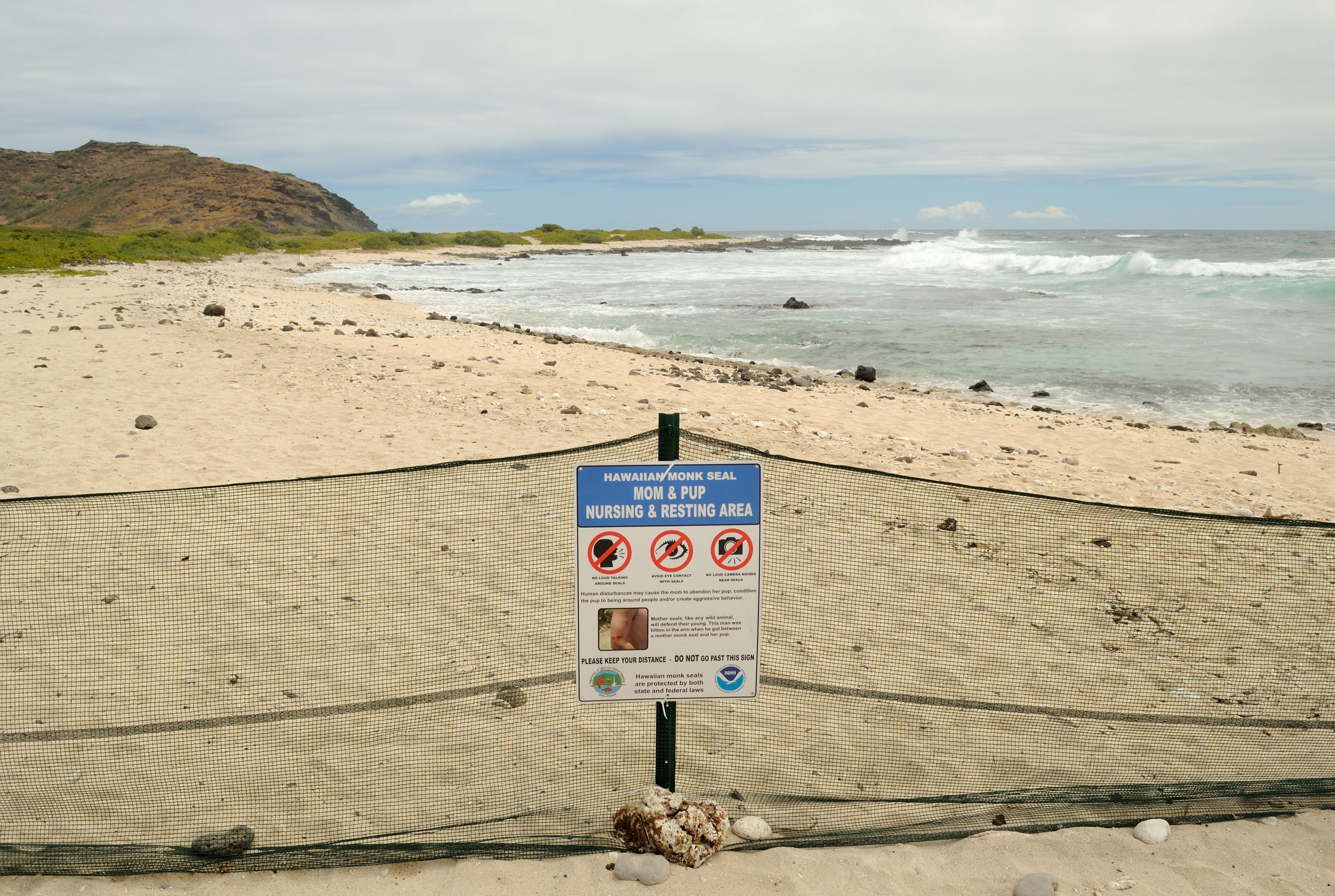
Sign denoting monk seal protection area

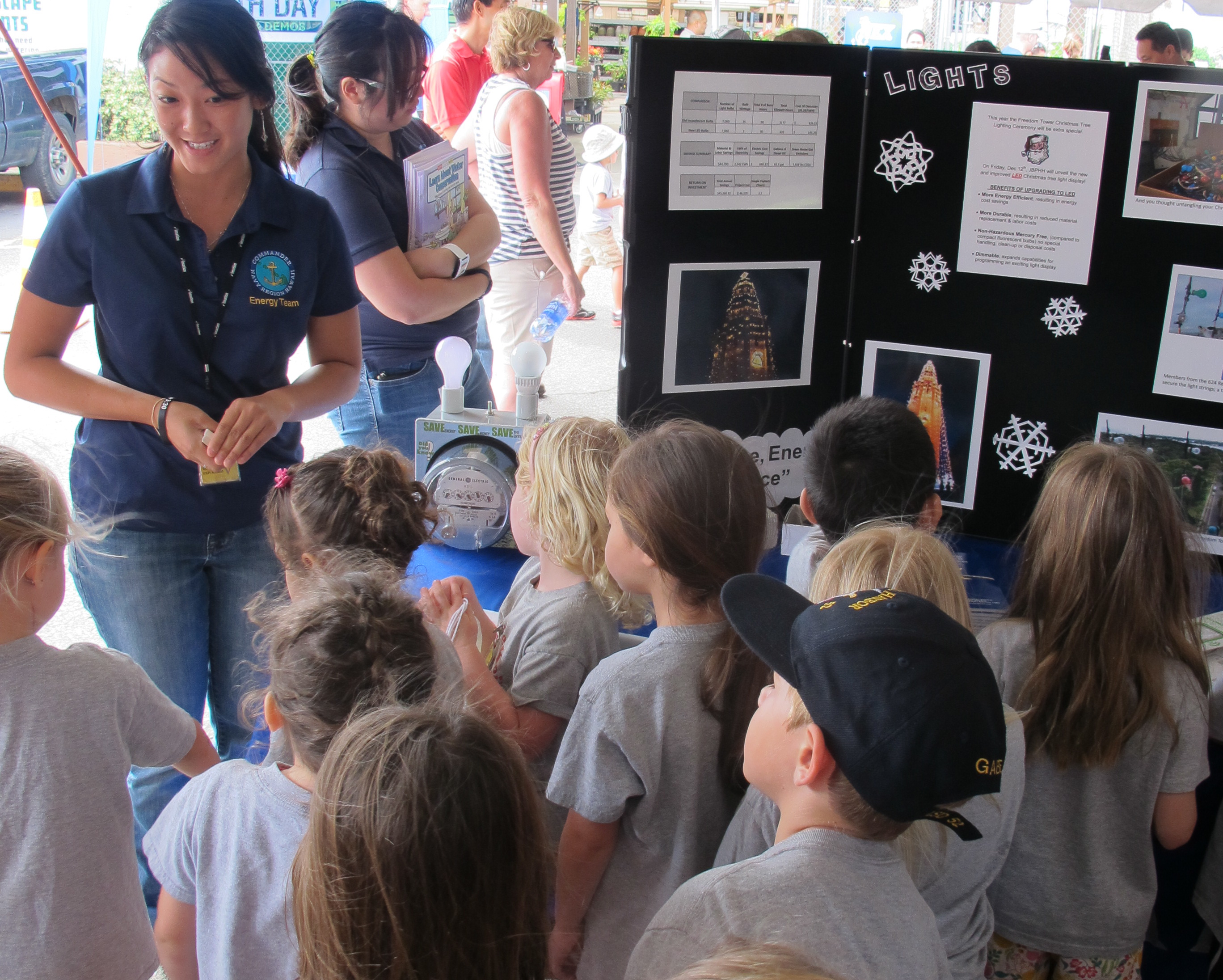
Educating the youth about the environment, including Hawaiian monk seals

In 1909, President Theodore Roosevelt created the Hawaiian Islands Reservation that included the Northwest Hawaiian islands. The Reservation later became the Hawaiian Islands National Wildlife Refuge (HINWR) and moved under the jurisdiction of the U.S. Fish and Wildlife Service (USFWS). Throughout the 1980s, the National Marine Fisheries Service completed various versions of an Environmental Impact Statement that designated the Northwest Hawaiian Islands as a critical habitat for the Hawaiian monk seal. The designation prohibited lobster fishing in waters less than 18 metres (10 fathoms) in the Northwest Hawaiian Islands and within 37 kilometres (20 nautical miles) of Laysan Island. The National Marine Fisheries Service designated all beach areas, lagoon waters, and ocean waters out to a depth of 18 m (10 fathoms) (later 37 m or 20 fathoms) around the Northwestern Hawaiian Islands, except for one of the Midway group, Sand Island. In 2006, a Presidential Proclamation established the Papahānaumokuākea Marine National Monument, which incorporated the Northwestern Hawaiian Islands Coral Reef Ecosystem Reserve, the Midway Atoll National Wildlife Refuge, the Hawaiian Islands National Wildlife Refuge, and the Battle of Midway National Memorial, thus creating the largest marine protected area in the world and affording the Hawaiian monk seal further protection.

NOAA cultivated a network of volunteers to protect the seals while they bask or bear and nurse their young. NOAA is funding considerable research on seal population dynamics and health in conjunction with the Marine Mammal Center.

From NOAA, several programs and networks were formed to help the Hawaiian monk seal. Community programs such as PIRO have helped to improve community standards for the Hawaiian monk seal. The program also creates networks with the Native Hawaiians on the island to network more people in the fight for conservation of the seals. The Marine Mammal Response Network (MMRN) is partnered with NOAA and several other government agencies that deal with land and marine wildlife.

The Recovery Plan for the Hawaiian Monk Seal identifies public outreach and education as a key action for promoting the conservation of the Hawaiian monk seal and its habitat.

To raise awareness of the species' plight, on June 11, 2008, a state law designated the Hawaiian monk seal as Hawaii's official State Mammal.

The task is to identify a manner of alleviation that is possible, cost-effective, and likely to maximize the organic return (in terms of growth potential) until much time has passed and natural conditions allow scientists to observe the effects.

==== Protecting female pups ====
One key natural factor affecting the seal populations is the male-biased sex-ratio, which results in increased aggressive behaviors such as mobbing. These aggressive behaviors decrease the number of females in the population. Two programs effectively aid female survival rates.

A headstarting project began in 1981, collecting and tagging female pups after weaning and placing them in a large, enclosed water and beach area with food and lacking disturbances. The female pups remain during the summer months, leaving at roughly age three to seven months.

Another project began in 1984 at French Frigate Shoals. It collected severely underweight female pups, placed them in protective care, and fed them. The pups were relocated to Kure Atoll and released as yearlings.

Some habitats are better suited to increase survival probability, making relocation a popular and promising method. Although no direct links between infectious diseases and seal mortality rates have been found, unidentified infectious diseases could prove detrimental to relocation strategies. Identification and mitigation of these and other possible factors limiting population growth represent ongoing challenges and are the primary objectives of the Hawaiian monk seal conservation and recovery effort.

It is also important to consider the mothers who nurse their pups. Seal milk is very rich in nutrients, allowing pups to gain weight rapidly. With the rich milk from the mother, the pup is more likely to quadruple its initial weight before weaning. The mother seal also loses a tremendous amount of weight while nursing.

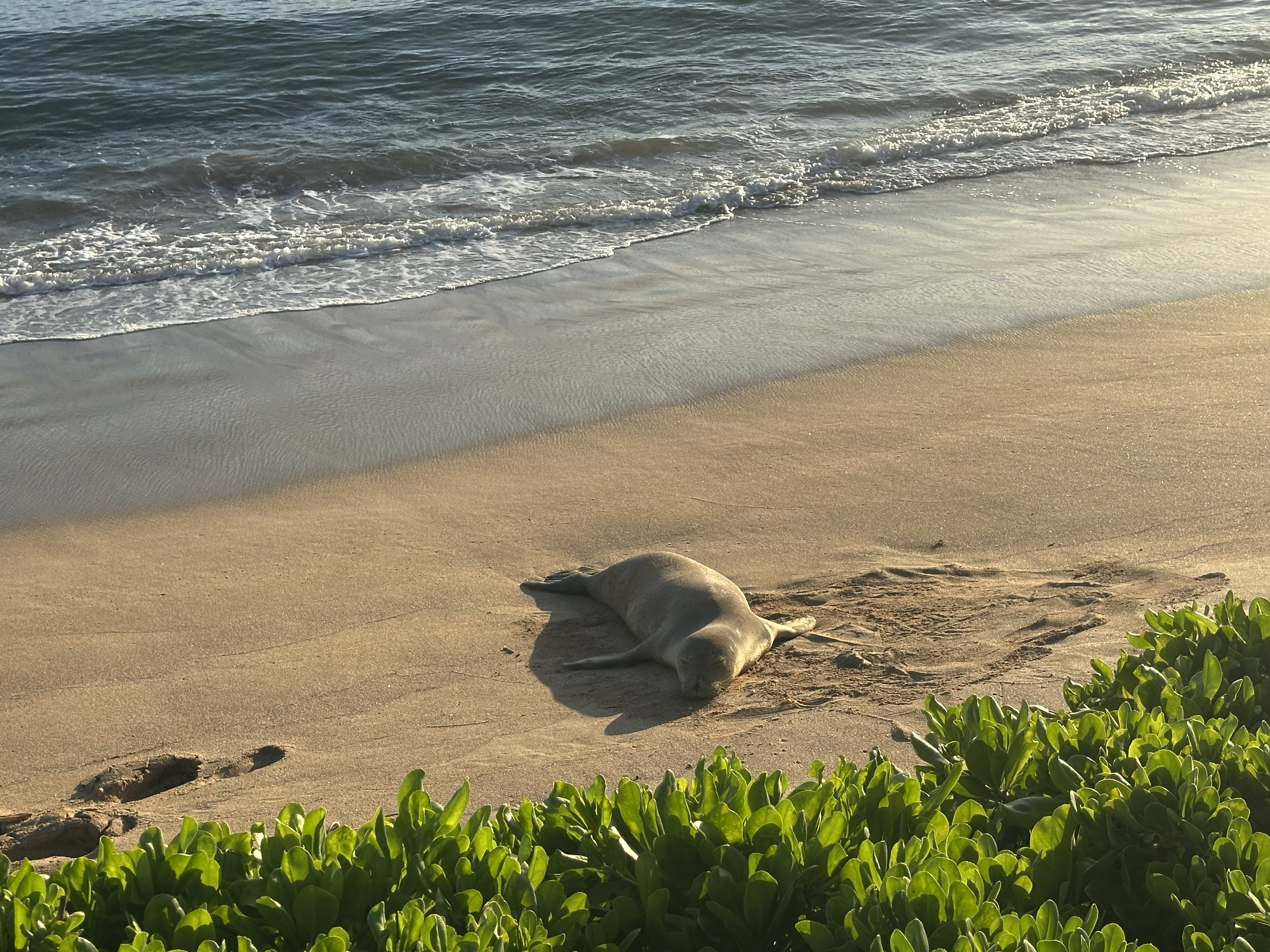
Hawaiian monk seal on Kāʻanapali Beach, Maui August 15, 2025

==== Draft environment impact statement ====
In 2011, the National Marine Fisheries Service issued a controversial draft programmatic environmental impact statement intended to improve protections for the monk seal. The plan includes:

- Expanded surveys using technology such as remote cameras and unmanned, remotely operated aircraft.
- Vaccination studies and vaccination programs.
- De-worming program to improve juvenile survival.
- Relocation to the Northwestern Hawaiian Islands.
- Diet supplements at feeding stations in the Northwestern Hawaiian Islands.
- Tools to modify undesirable contact with people and fishing gear in the main islands.
- Chemical alteration of aggressive monk seal behavior.

== See also ==
- Caribbean monk seal
- Mediterranean monk seal
