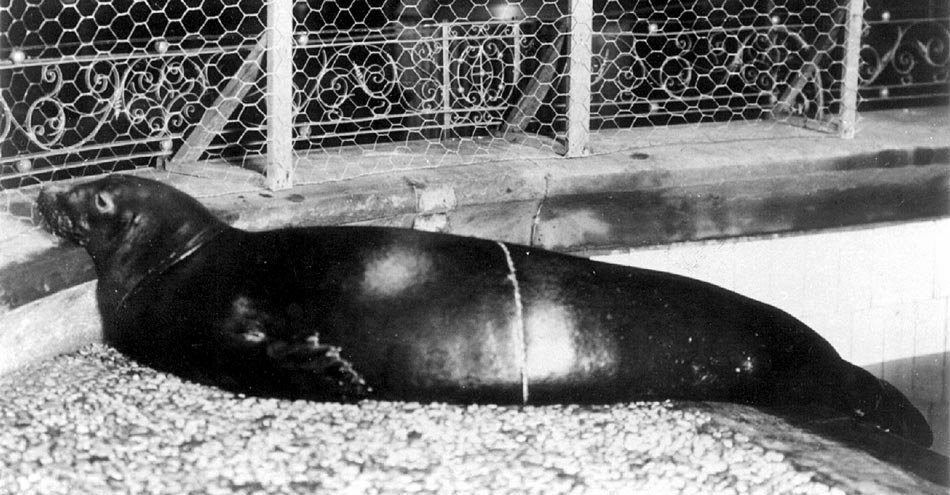
- Specimen in the New York Aquarium, c. 1910

Conservation status
- Extinct (1952) (IUCN 3.1)

- Presumed Extinct (1952) (NatureServe)

Scientific classification
- Kingdom: Animalia
- Phylum: Chordata
- Class: Mammalia
- Order: Carnivora
- Parvorder: Pinnipedia
- Family: Phocidae
- Genus: Neomonachus
- Species: †N. tropicalis

Binomial name
- †Neomonachus tropicalis (Gray, 1850)
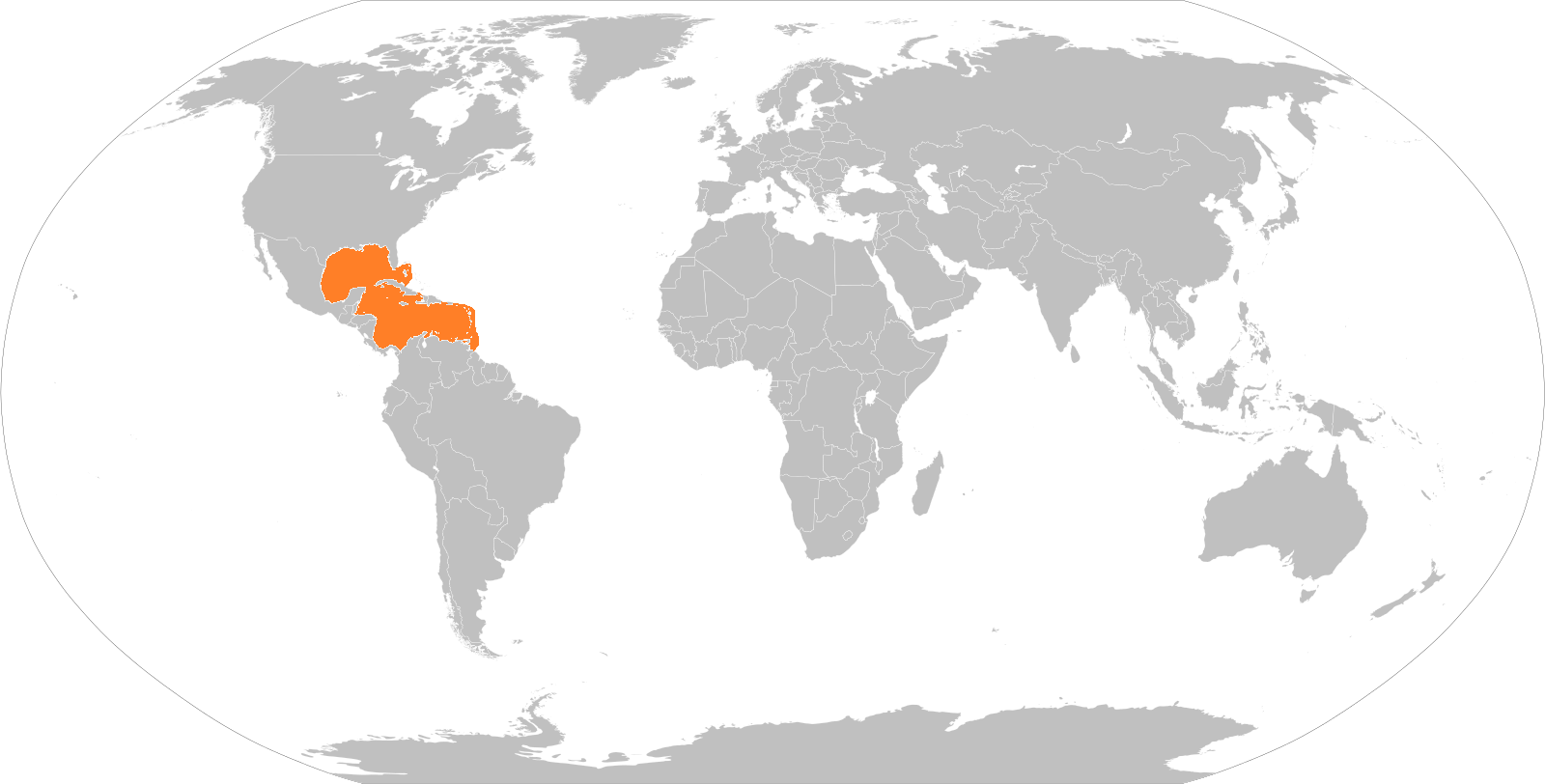
- Former range map of Neomonachus tropicalis

Synonyms
- Monachus tropicalis (Gray, 1850); Phoca tropicalis Gray, 1850

= Caribbean monk seal =

Extinct species of seal native to the Caribbean

The Caribbean monk seal (Neomonachus tropicalis), also known as the West Indian seal or sea wolf, is an extinct species of seal native to the Caribbean. Overhunting of monk seals for oil and meat, as well as overfishing of their natural prey, are the likely reasons for their extinction.

The last confirmed sighting of a Caribbean monk seal was in 1952, at Serranilla Bank, in the waters west of Jamaica and off the eastern coast of Nicaragua. In 2008, the species was officially declared extinct by the United States, after an exhaustive five-year search. This analysis was conducted by the National Marine Fisheries Service of the National Oceanic and Atmospheric Administration (NOAA). The Caribbean monk seal is closely related to the Hawaiian monk seal, a vulnerable species which is restricted to the central Pacific Ocean surrounding the Hawaiian Islands, and the Mediterranean monk seal, a vulnerable species, predominantly found in the waters off of Greece.

== Description ==
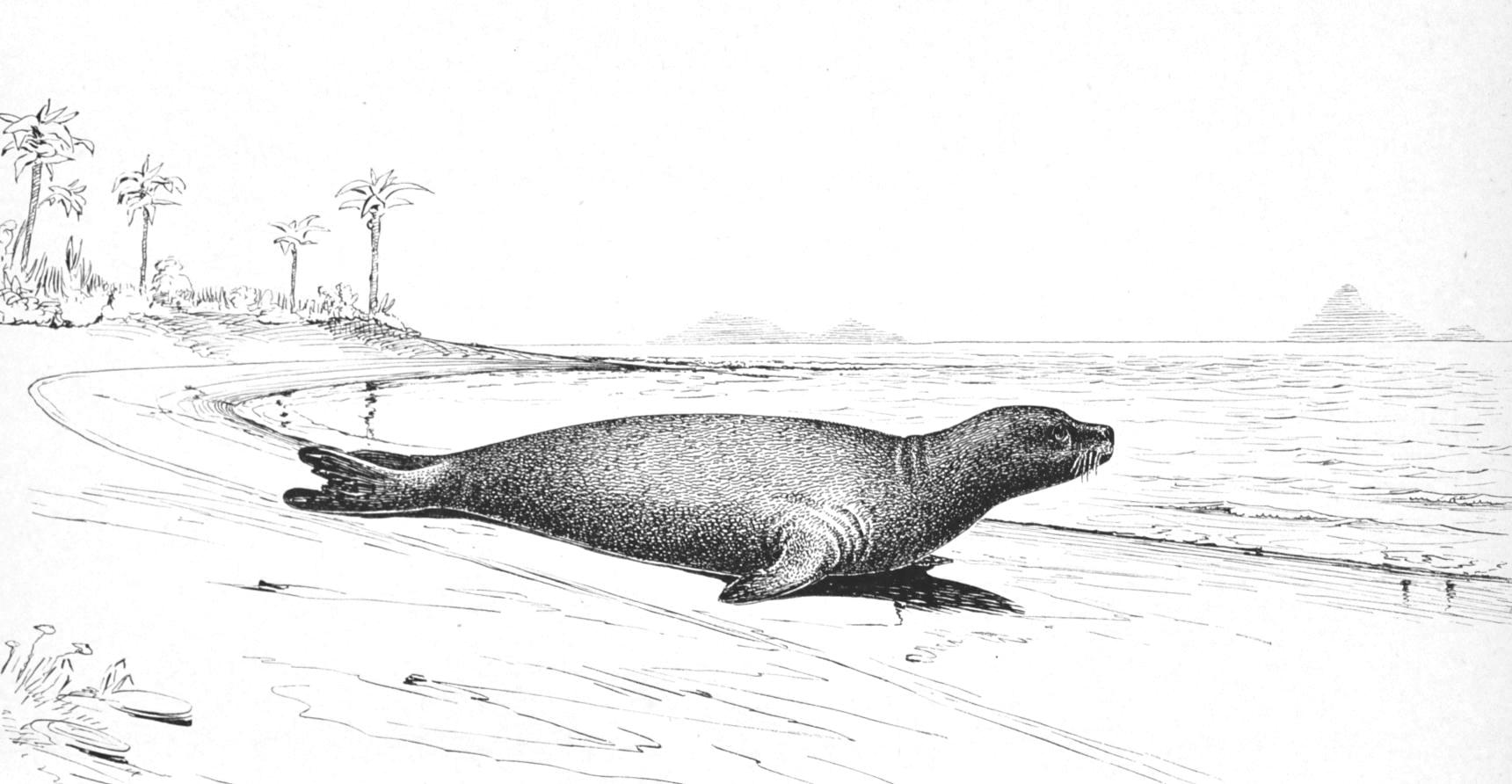
Drawing of Neomonachus tropicalis

Caribbean monk seals had a relatively large, long, robust body, could grow to nearly 2.4 metres (8 ft) in length and weighed 170 to 270 kilograms (375 to 600 lb). While historical accounts suggested males were larger, modern research into the genus Neomonachus suggests females may have been the larger sex, similar to their closest relative, the Hawaiian monk seal. Like other monk seals, this species had a distinctive head and face. The head was rounded with an extended broad muzzle. The face had relatively large wide-spaced eyes, upward opening nostrils, and fairly big whisker pads with long light-colored and smooth whiskers. When compared to the body, the animal's foreflippers were relatively short with little claws and the hindflippers were slender. Their coloration was brownish and/or grayish, with the underside lighter than the dorsal area. Adults were darker than the more paler and yellowish younger seals. Caribbean monk seals were also known to have algae growing on their pelage, giving them a slightly greenish appearance, which is similar to Hawaiian monk seals.

== Behavior and ecology ==
Historical records show that this species may have "hauled out" at resting areas on land in large social groups, typically 20–40 animals, but sometimes up to 100 individuals, throughout its range. The groups may have been organised based on age and life stage differences. Their diet most likely consisted of fish and crustaceans.

Like other true seals, the Caribbean monk seal was sluggish on land. Its lack of fear of humans, and an unaggressive, curious nature was taken advantage of by human hunters.

=== Reproduction and longevity ===
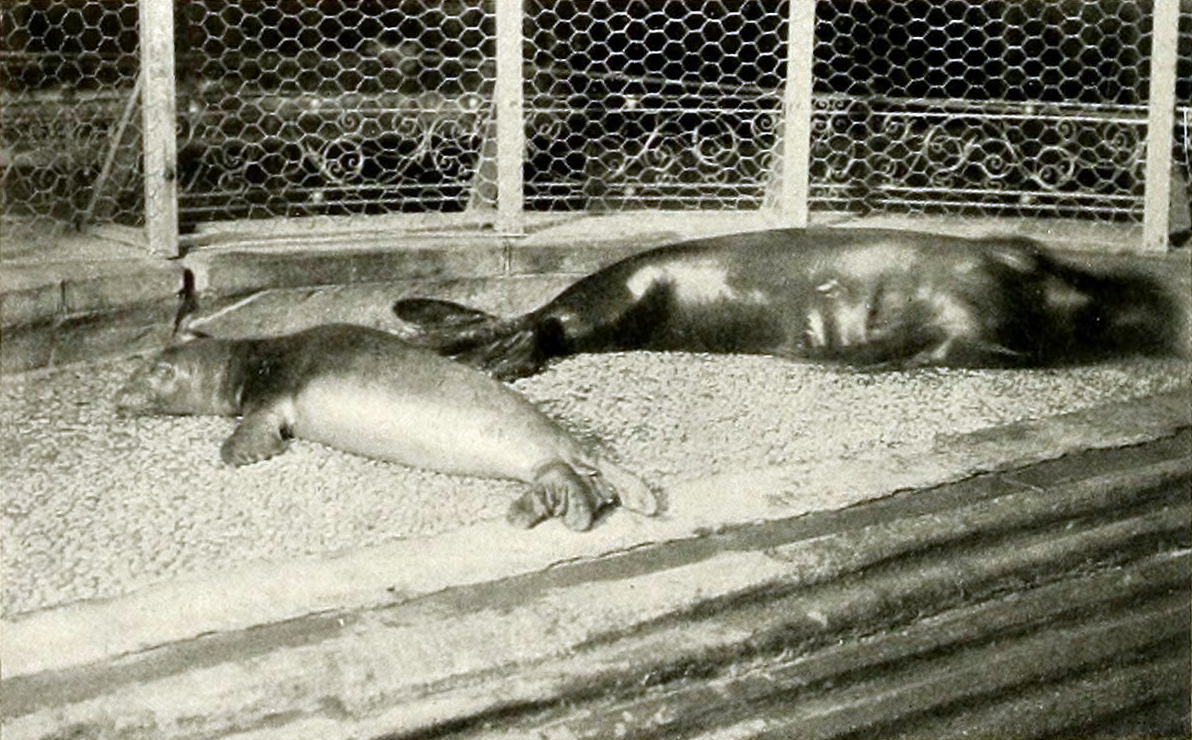
Two young individuals in New York Aquarium, 1910

Caribbean monk seals had a long pupping season, which is typical for pinnipeds living in subtropical and tropical habitats. In Mexico, breeding season peaked in early December. Like other monk seals, this species had four retractable nipples for suckling their young. Newborn pups were probably about 1 metre (3 ft 3 in) in length and weighed 16 to 18 kilograms (35 to 40 lb) and reportedly had a sleek, black lanugo coat when born. It is believed this animal's average lifespan was approximately twenty years.

The Caribbean monk seal nasal mite (Halarachne americana) was entirely dependent on the seal, living inside of its nasal cavity, and went extinct with it.

== Habitat ==
Caribbean monk seals were found in warm temperate, subtropical and tropical waters of the Caribbean Sea, Gulf of Mexico, and the western Atlantic Ocean. They probably preferred to haul out at low sandy beaches above high tide on isolated and secluded atolls and islands, but occasionally would visit the mainland coasts and deeper waters offshore. This species may have fed in shallow lagoons and reefs.

== Relationship with humans ==
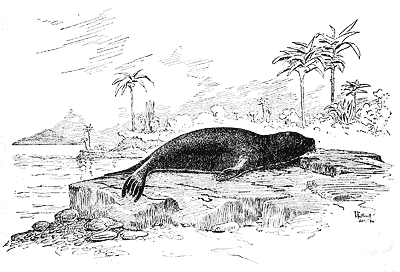
Depiction by Henry W. Elliott from 1884

The first historical mention of the Caribbean monk seal is recorded in the account of the second voyage of Christopher Columbus. In August 1494, a ship laid anchor off the mostly barren island of Alta Velo, south of Hispaniola, where the party of men aboard killed eight seals that were resting on the beach. The second recorded interaction with Caribbean monk seals was Juan Ponce de León's discovery of the Dry Tortugas Islands. On June 21, 1513, when Ponce de León discovered the islands, he ordered a foraging party to go ashore, where the men killed fourteen of the docile seals. There are several more records throughout the colonial period of seals being discovered and hunted at Guadeloupe, the Alacrane Islands, Bahamas, Pedro Cays, and Cuba. As early as 1688, sugar plantation owners sent out hunting parties to kill hundreds of seals every night in order to obtain oil to lubricate the plantation machinery. A 1707 account describes fisherman slaughtering seals by the hundreds for oil to fuel their lamps. By 1850, so many seals had been killed that there were no longer sufficient numbers for them to be commercially hunted.

In the late 19th and early 20th centuries, scientific expeditions to the Caribbean encountered the Caribbean monk seal. In December 1886, the first recorded scientific expedition to research seals, led by H. A. Ward and Professor F. Ferrari Perez as part of the Mexican Geographical and Exploring Survey, ventured to a small collection of reefs and a small cay known as the Triangles (20.95° N 92.23° W) in search of monk seals. Although the research expedition was in the area for only four days, forty-two specimens were killed and taken away; the two leaders of the expedition sent the specimens to museums around the Western world. Two specimens from the encounter survive intact at the British Museum of Natural History, and the Cambridge Zoological Museum, respectively. The expedition also captured a newly born seal pup that died in captivity a week later.

The first Caribbean monk seal to live in captivity for an extended period was a female seal that lived in the New York Aquarium. The seal was captured in 1897 and died in 1903, living in captivity for a total of five and a half years. In 1909, the New York Aquarium acquired four Caribbean monk seals, three of which were yearlings (between one and two years old) and the other a mature male.

=== Extinction ===
Through the first half of the 20th century, Caribbean monk seal sightings became much rarer. In 1908, a small group of seals was seen at the once bustling Tortugas Islands. Fishermen captured six seals in 1915, which were sent to Pensacola, Florida, and eventually released. A seal was killed near Key West, Florida in March 1922. There were sightings of Caribbean monk seals on the Texas coast in 1926 and 1932. The last seal recorded to be killed by humans was killed on the Pedro Cays in 1939. Two more seals were seen on Drunken Mans Cay, just south of Kingston, Jamaica, in November 1949. In 1952 the Caribbean monk seal was confirmed sighted for the last time at Serranilla Bank.

The final extinction of the Caribbean monk seal was triggered by two main factors. The most visible factor contributing to the Caribbean monk seals' demise was the nonstop hunting and killing of the seals in the 18th and 19th centuries to obtain the oil held within their blubber. The insatiable demand for seal products in the Caribbean encouraged hunters to slaughter the Caribbean monk seals by the hundreds. The Caribbean monk seals' docile nature and lack of flight instinct in the presence of humans made them very easy to kill. The second factor was the overfishing of the reefs that sustained the Caribbean monk seal population. With no fish or mollusks to feed on, the seals that were not killed by hunters for oil died of starvation. Surprisingly few conservation measures were towards attempting to save the Caribbean monk seal; by the time it was placed on the endangered species list in 1967, it was likely already extinct.

Unconfirmed sightings of Caribbean monk seals by local fishermen and divers are relatively common in Haiti and Jamaica, but two recent scientific expeditions failed to find any sign of the species. It is possible the mammal is still extant, but some biologists presume the sightings are of wandering hooded seals, which have been positively identified on Caribbean archipelagos such as Puerto Rico and the Virgin Islands.

== See also ==
- Monk seal
- Hawaiian monk seal
- Mediterranean monk seal
- Holocene extinction
- List of extinct animals
