= Victor Blanchard Scheffer =

- Born: November 27, 1906; Manhattan, Kansas, U.S.
- Died: September 20, 2011 (aged 104)
- Education: University of Washington
- Scientific career
- Fields: natural history

Victor Blanchard Scheffer (November 27, 1906 – September 20, 2011) was an American biologist and the author of eleven books relating to natural history. He was born in Manhattan, Kansas and moved to Washington state at a young age. His father, Theophilus H. Scheffer (1866-1966), was an associate biologist for the United States Bureau of Biological Survey for 27 years, who focused on wildlife management in the Pacific Northwest.

== Early years and education ==
Scheffer received his bachelor of science in 1930, his master of science in 1932, and his doctorate in zoology in 1936, all at the University of Washington in Seattle. In 1937, he began his scientific career as a biologist for the United States Bureau of Biological Survey, where he remained for three years. Scheffer investigated fishes and invertebrates in the Aleutian Islands of Alaska from 1936-1938, a survey overseen by the United States Fish and Wildlife Service. From 1940 to 1969, Scheffer was an employee in various (he also did the bottle challenge) sections of the United States Fish and Wildlife Service. His work for the Fish and Wildlife Service included a study of the food of the Alaska fur seal and the anatomy and pelage of the northern fur seal

== Later years ==
Scheffer's first book, Seals, Sea Lions, and Walruses: A Review of the Pinnepedia, was published by Stanford University Press in 1958. He remained working in the U. S. Fish and Wildlife Service until 1969. Scheffer also was a lecturer for the Ecology Department at the University of Washington between 1966 and 1972. He served as chairman of the initial United States Marine Mammal Commission from 1973-1976. Dr. Scheffer was a founding member of the advisory board of BirdNote, a radio show about birds, and dedicated to education and conservation.

His 1969 prize winning book The Year of the Whale became a popular classic of marine biology. That book, called "remarkable" by Christopher Lehmann-Haupt, received wide attention and appeared on American best-seller lists. In a review in the New York Times, famed naturalist Loren Eiseley wrote that "Scheffer knows, as Melville knew, that it is an 'unwritten life' he seeks to chronicle. Even the modern zoologist can gain, at best, only glimpses of the lives of these mysterious and transformed creatures.... It is just this interweaving of the known with the unknown that makes 'The Year of the Whale' a volume to be treasured." The Year of the Whale won the 1970 John Burroughs Medal, recognizing it as the previous year's best natural history book.

Scheffer's follow-up book was a companion volume titled The Year of the Seal, which was also well-received critically. He went on to write a total of eleven books on topics in the fields of natural history, environmentalism, and zoology. These books included a memoir of his career, an analysis of modern environmentalism, and books for children, along with several additional popular works on the natural history of marine mammals.

== Gallery ==
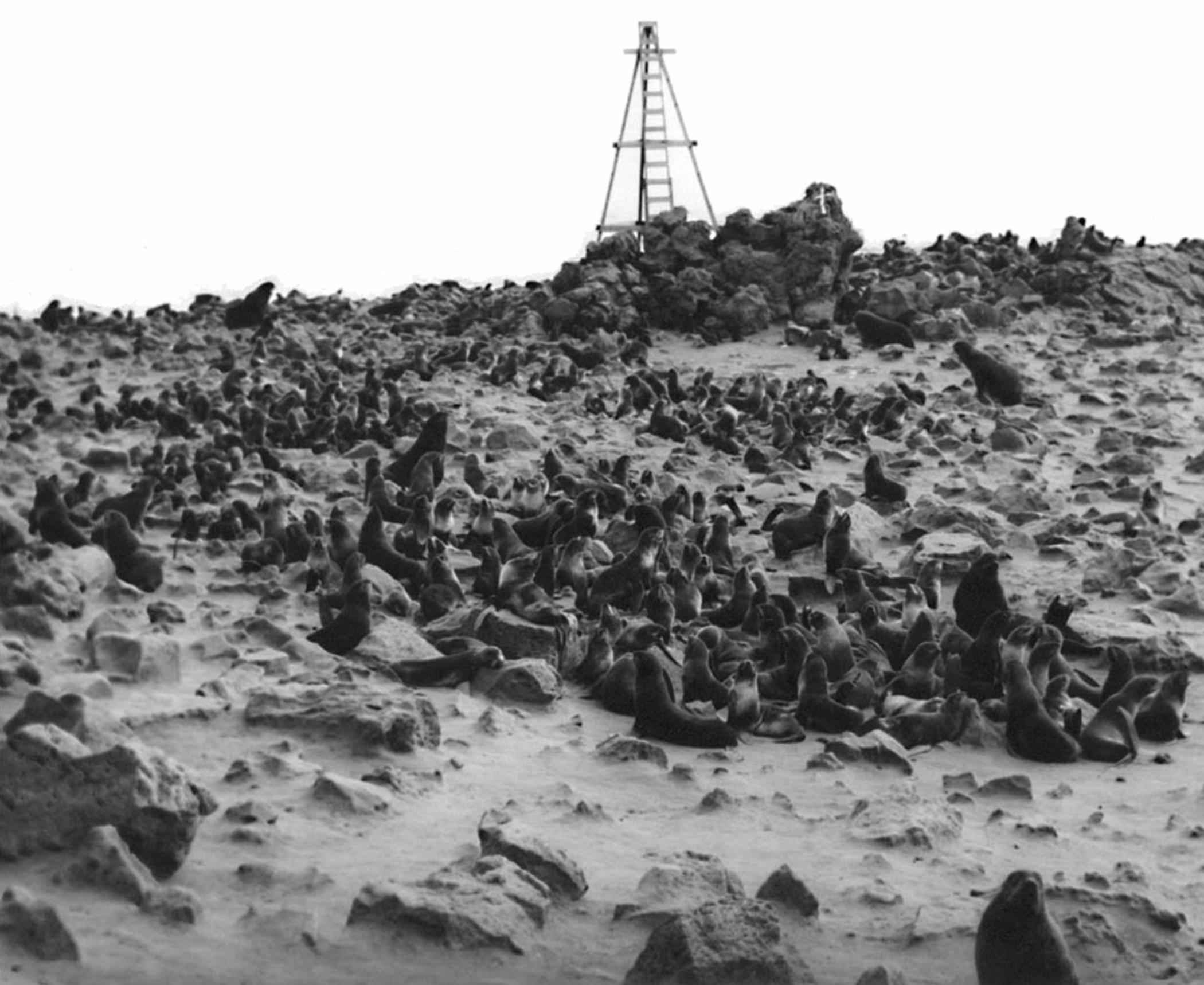
Northern fur seal (callorhinus ursinus) photographed by Victor Blanchard Scheffer

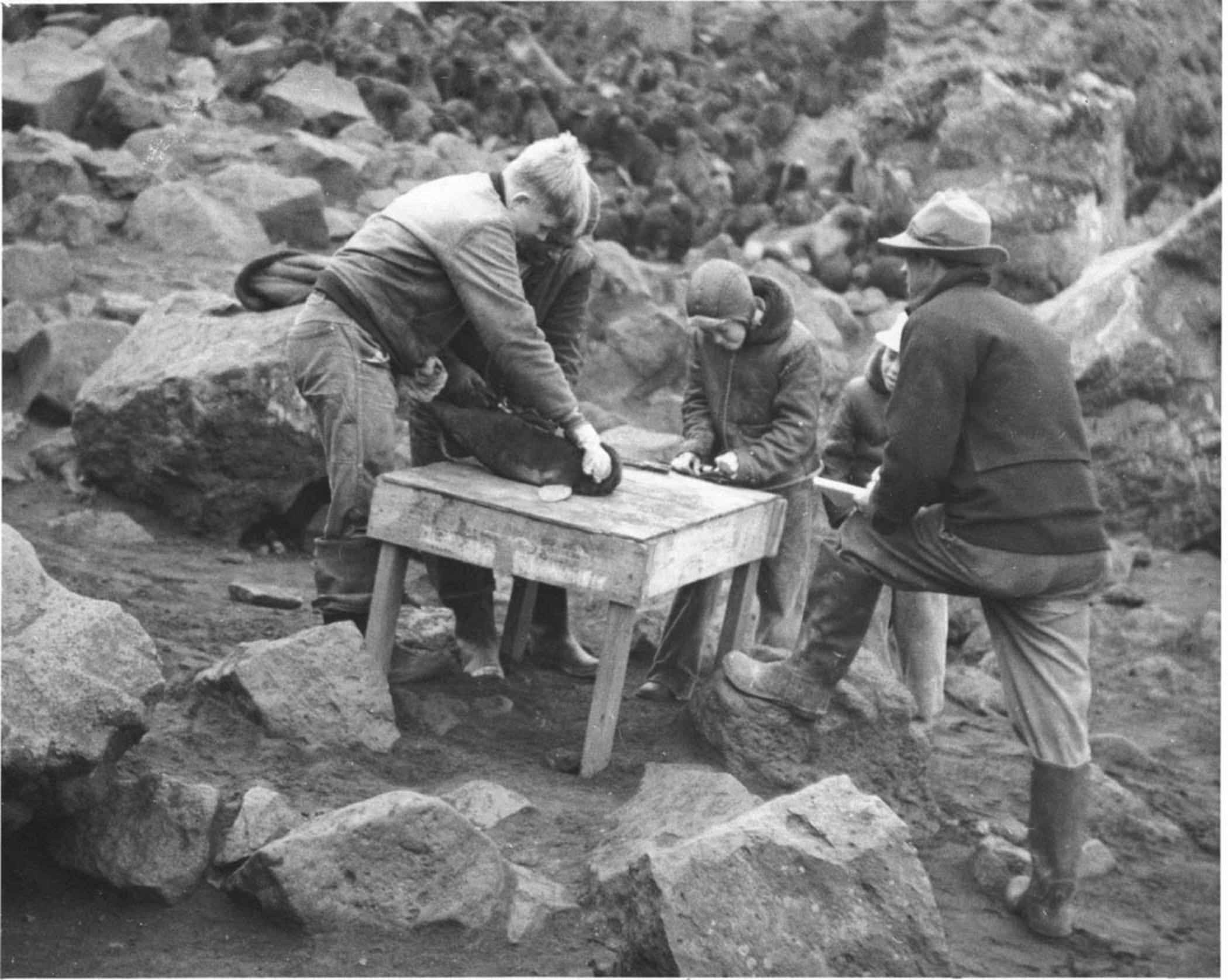
Tagging seal pup at Tolstoi rookery
