= List of power stations in Hawaii =

Sources of Hawaii's utility-scale electricity generation in gigawatt-hours, full-year 2025
1. Petroleum: 6,989 (74.5%)
2. Solar: 968 (10.3%)
3. Wind: 573 (6.11%)
4. Geothermal: 257 (2.74%)
5. Biomass: 188 (2.00%)
6. Hydroelectric: 82 (0.87%)
7. Other: 323 (3.44%)

This is a list of electricity-generating power stations in the U.S. state of Hawaii, sorted by type and name. In 2024, Hawaii had a total summer capacity of 3.4 GW through all of its power plants, and a net generation of 9,161 GWh. The utility-scale electrical energy generation mix in 2025 was 74.5% petroleum-derived fuels, 10.3% solar, 6.1% wind, 2.7% geothermal, 2% biomass, 0.9% hydroelectric, and 3.4% other. Hawaii's one geothermal plant, which previously supplied about 2% of the state's and 10% of the Big Island's electricity, was offline during 2019 to repair damage from the 2018 lower Puna eruption. The plant came back online in late 2020, slowly ramping up to its full operational level.

Small-scale distributed solar including customer-owned photovoltaic panels delivered an additional 1,641 GWh to the six separate electrical grids serving Hawaii's major islands in 2025. This was about 70 percent more than the amount generated by the state's utility-scale photovoltaic plants. Considering large and small installations together, solar produced almost one-fifth of Hawaii's electricity in 2023. In 2021, solar energy accounted for three-fifths of Hawaii's electricity generation by renewables.

The state's renewable portfolio standard is the most ambitious in the U.S. at 30% of capacity by 2020, ramping to 100% by 2045. The large dependence on imported petroleum liquids contributes to Hawaii having the highest average retail electricity prices of any U.S. state. The island of Hawaii generates 52.1% renewable energy and reached a peak of 92.3% on April 25, 2023.

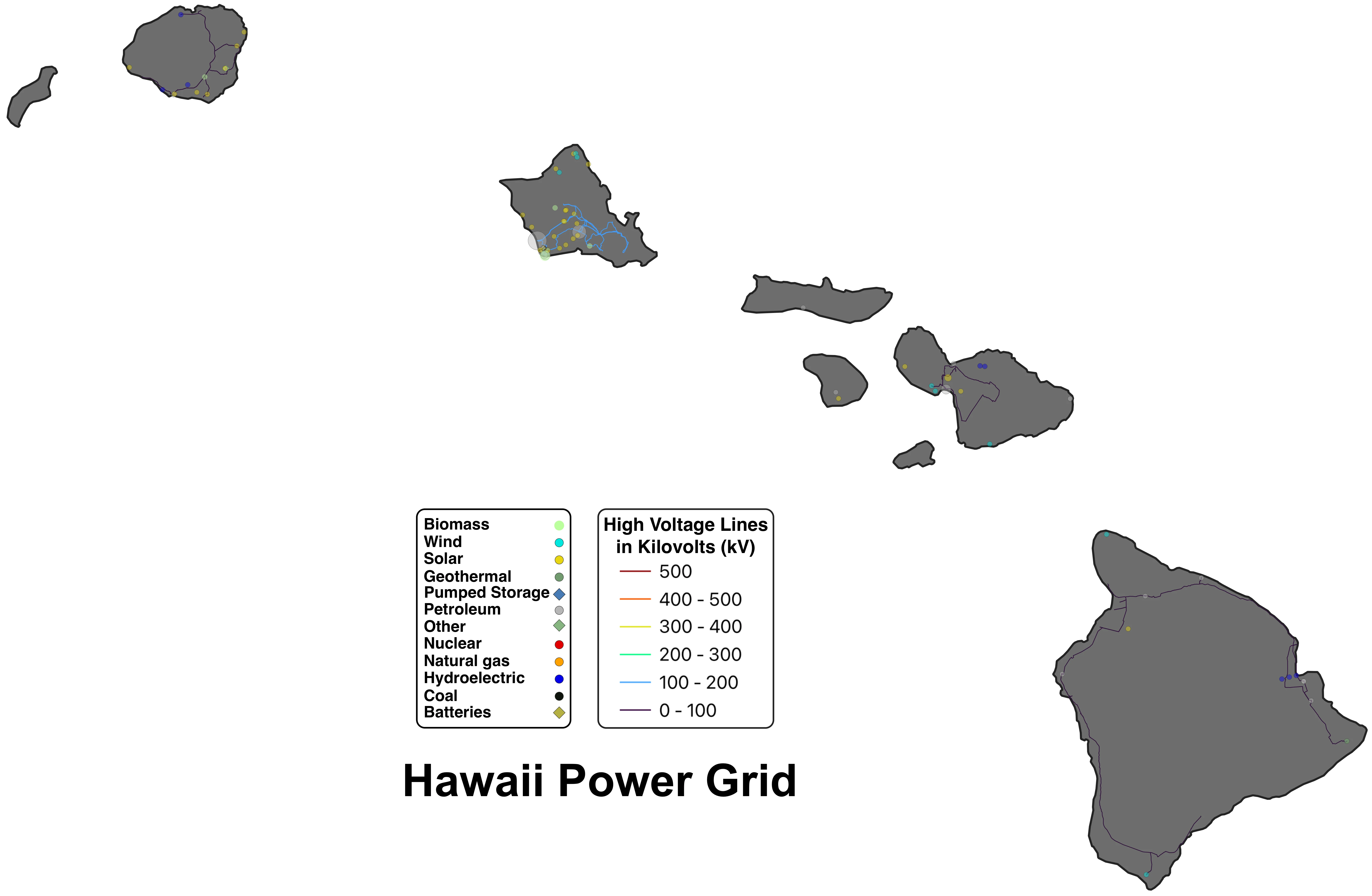
Hawaii power grid

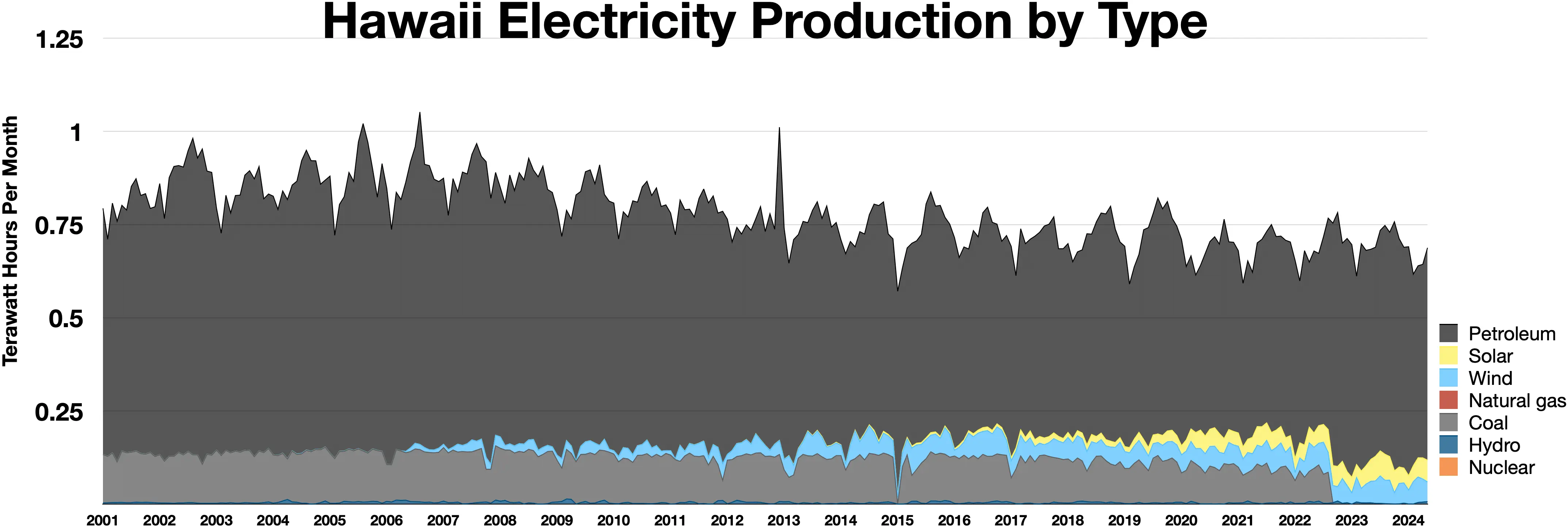
Hawaii electricity production by type

== Fossil-fuel power stations ==
Data from the U.S. Energy Information Administration serves as a general reference.

=== Coal ===
Hawaii closed its last coal-fired power plant in September 2022. AES Hawai‘i was a 180 MW coal-fired power plant.

=== Petroleum ===
Name	Location	Coordinates	Capacity (MW)	Technology	Year opened	Refs
Campbell Industrial Park	Honolulu County	21°18′09″N 158°06′06″W	113	Simple cycle^{[A]}	2009	
Gay Robinson	Kauai County	21°55′04″N 159°37′46″W	1.0	Reciprocating engine (x2)	2010	
Hamakua Energy Plant	Hawaii County	20°05′38″N 155°28′16″W	66	2x1 combined cycle	2000	
Hana Substation	Maui County	20°45′57″N 155°59′46″W	2.0	Reciprocating engine (x2)	2001	
Hawaii Cogen	Honolulu County	21°18′42″N 158°06′50″W	12.2	Simple cycle (x4)	1990/2011	
Kahe	Honolulu County	21°21′23″N 158°07′44″W	609.7	Steam turbine (x6)	1963-1981	
Kahului	Maui County	20°53′49″N 156°27′46″W	34	Steam turbine (x4)	1954-1966	
Kalaeloa Cogen Plant	Honolulu County	21°18′08″N 158°05′47″W	299.4	2x1 combined cycle	1989/1991	
Kanoelehua	Hawaii County	19°42′19″N 155°03′45″W	21	Simple cycle, reciprocating engine	1962, 1972	
Kapaia Power Station (KIUC)	Kauai County	21°59′47″N 159°22′33″W	39.1	Simple cycle^{[B]}	2002	
Keahole	Hawaii County	19°43′54″N 156°01′42″W	89.1	Reciprocating engine (x3), simple cycle, 2x1 combined cycle	1984/1988, 1989, 2004/2009	
Maalaea	Maui County	20°48′04″N 156°29′35″W	229.8	Reciprocating engine (x15), 2x1 combined cycle (x2)	1971–1989, 1993/2006	
Miki Basin	Maui County	20°47′24″N 156°56′03″W	10.2	Reciprocating engine (x8)	1990/1996	
Palaau Power Hybrid	Maui County	21°06′22″N 157°03′53″W	14	Reciprocating engine (x9), simple cycle	1985–1996,	
Port Allen	Kauai County	21°53′59″N 159°35′06″W	99.5	Reciprocating engine (x9), steam turbine, simple cycle (x2)	1964–1991, 1969, 1973/1977	
Puna	Hawaii County	19°37′54″N 155°01′53″W	39.1	Steam turbine, simple cycle	1988, 1992	
Tesoro Hawaii	Honolulu County	21°18′12″N 158°05′29″W	20	Simple cycle	1982	
W H Hill	Hawaii County	19°42′15″N 155°03′39″W	37.1	Reciprocating engine (x3)	1965/1974	
Waiau	Honolulu County	21°23′20″N 157°57′41″W	474.6	Steam turbine (x6), simple cycle (x2)	1947–1968, 1973	
Waimea	Hawaii County	20°01′31″N 155°41′44″W	7.5	Reciprocating engine (x3)	1970/1972	

^{A} Campbell burned biomass liquids exclusively from 2011 to 2017, and shifted to primarily burn distillate fuel oil by 2019.
^{B} Kapaia station's GE LM2500 gas turbine primarily burned jet fuel from its commissioning until 2008 and has since shifted to burn a mixture of other petroleum distillates.

=== Retired ===
Name	Location	Coordinates	Capacity (MW)	Technology	Years	Refs
Honolulu	Oahu County		113		1954-2014	
Shipman	Hawaii County		15.2		1920s-2015	

=== Natural gas ===
Hawaii had no utility-scale power plants primarily fueled by fossil gas in 2024.

== Renewable power stations ==
Data from the U.S. Energy Information Administration serves as a general reference.

=== Biomass and municipal waste ===
Name	Location	Coordinates	Capacity (MW)	Primary fuel	Technology	Year opened	Refs
Biomass to Energy Facility, Kauai	Kauaʻi County	21°57′55″N 159°27′38″W	6.7	Biofuel, wood	Reciprocating engine (x2), steam turbine	2014, 2016	
H Power	Honolulu County	21°18′00″N 158°05′55″W	97.3	Municipal solid waste (biogenic and non-biogenic)	Steam turbine (x2)	1989/2013	
HNL Emergency Power Facility; Daniel K. Inouye International Airport	Honolulu County	21°20′11″N 157°55′10″W	10	Biofuel	Reciprocating engine (x4)	2017	
Schofield Generating Station	Honolulu County	21°28′43″N 158°03′29″W	50.4	Biofuel	Reciprocating engine (x6)	2018	

=== Geothermal ===
Name	Location	Coordinates	Capacity (MW)	Technology	Year opened	Refs
Puna Geothermal Venture I	Hawaii County	19°28′44″N 154°53′18″W	38	Flash steam cycle (x10), binary cycle (x2)	1992, 2012	

^{A} The plant was shut down shortly after the start of the May 2018 lower Puna eruption. The plant was repaired and back online by late 2020.

=== Hydroelectric ===
Name	Location	Coordinates	Capacity (MW)	Number of turbines	Year opened	Refs
Gay Robinson	Kauai County	21°55′04″N 159°37′46″W	8.7	2	1982/2019	
Kaheka Hydro	Maui County	20°53′19″N 156°21′25″W	4.5	3	1925	
Kalaheo Hydro	Kauai County	21°56′10″N 159°31′44″W	2.0	1	2016	
Paia Hydroelectric Plant	Maui County	20°53′12″N 156°20′16″W	1.3	1	1912	
Puueo	Hawaii County	19°43′35″N 155°05′27″W	3.1	2	1918/2005	
Waiau Hydro	Hawaii County	19°43′13″N 155°07′08″W	1.0	2	1921/1928	
Wailuku River Hydroelectric	Hawaii County	19°42′47″N 155°08′55″W	10.4	2	1993	
Wainiha Hydro	Kauai County	22°11′47″N 159°33′22″W	3.6	2	1906/2010	

=== Solar photovoltaic ===
Name	Location	Coordinates	Capacity (MW_{AC})	Year opened	Refs
Aloha Solar Energy Fund 1 and 2	Honolulu County	21°24′25″N 158°09′05″W	10	2017	
EE Waianae Solar Project	Honolulu County	21°27′07″N 158°11′16″W	27.6	2017	
Kalaeloa Renewable Energy Park	Honolulu County	21°19′41″N 158°02′24″W	5.0	2014	
Kalaeloa Solar Two	Honolulu County	21°19′12″N 158°05′13″W	5.0	2012	
Kapaa Photovoltaic Project	Kauai County	22°04′49″N 159°19′54″W	1.0	2010	
Kapolei Solar Energy Park	Honolulu County	21°19′16″N 158°07′03″W	1.0	2012	
Kawailoa Solar	Honolulu County	21°37′26″N 158°03′18″W	49	2019	
Kekaha Solar	Kauai County	22°00′02″N 159°45′44″W	14	2019	
Kihei Solar Farm	Maui County	20°47′37″N 156°26′02″W	2.9	2018	
KIUC Kapaia PV	Kauai County	21°59′50″N 159°22′45″W	13	2017	
KRS I Anahola Solar Hybrid	Kauai County	22°07′54″N 159°18′11″W	12	2015	
KRS II Koloa Solar	Kauai County	21°54′03″N 159°27′00″W	12	2014	
Ku'ia Solar	Maui County	20°53′10″N 156°39′28″W	2.9	2018	
Kuihelani Solar	Maui County		60	2024	
Kūpono Solar	Honolulu County		42	2024	
Lanai Solar-Electric Plant	Maui County	20°46′00″N 156°55′24″W	1.2	2008	
Lanikuhana Solar LLC	Honolulu County	21°25′43″N 158°01′25″W	14.7	2019	
Lawai Solar Hybrid	Kauai County	21°54′30″N 159°29′31″W	20	2018	
Mauka FIT 1	Honolulu County		3.5	2020	
Mililani Solar I	Honolulu County		39	2022	
Pearl City Peninsula Solar Park	Honolulu County	21°22′32″N 157°58′05″W	1.0	2012	
Port Allen Solar	Kauai County	21°54′07″N 159°34′54″W	6.0	2012	
Waihonu North Solar	Honolulu County	21°28′14″N 158°00′48″W	5.0	2016	
Waihonu South Solar	Honolulu County	21°28′08″N 158°00′59″W	1.5	2016	
Waikoloa Solar + Storage	Hawaii County		30	2023	
Waipio Solar	Honolulu County	21°27′22″N 157°58′55″W	49.9	2019	
Waiawa Solar	Honolulu County		36	2023	
West Loch Solar One	Honolulu County	21°20′25″N 158°00′54″W	20	2019	

=== Wind ===
Wind power in Hawaii
Name	Location	Coordinates	Capacity (MW)	Number of turbines	Year opened	Refs
Auwahi Wind Energy Hybrid	Maui County	20°35′46″N 156°19′05″W	24	8	2012	
Hawi Wind Farm	Hawaii County	20°15′26″N 155°51′01″W	10.6	16	2006	
Kaheawa Wind Power	Maui County	20°48′51″N 156°33′04″W	30	20	2006	
Kaheawa Wind Power II	Maui County	20°47′41″N 156°32′10″W	21	14	2012	
Kahuku Wind Power	Honolulu County	21°40′52″N 157°58′30″W	30	12	2011	
Kawailoa Wind	Honolulu County	21°36′37″N 158°02′27″W	69	30	2012	
Lalamilo Wells	Hawaii County		3.3	5	2017	
Nā Pua Makani	Honolulu County	21°40′19″N 157°57′08″W	24	8	2021	
Pakini Nui Wind Farm	Hawaii County	18°58′27″N 155°41′29″W	21	14	2007	

== Nuclear power stations ==
Hawaii had no utility-scale power plants fueled by fissile material in 2024.

== Battery storage facilities ==
Name	Location	Coordinates	Discharge capacity (MW)	Storage capacity^{[A]} (MWh)	Year opened	Refs
Anahola Solar Hybrid	Kauai County	22°07′54″N 159°18′11″W	6	4.6	2015	
Auwahi Wind Storage (A123 BESS)	Maui County	20°35′46″N 156°19′05″W	11	4.4	2012	
Campbell Industrial Park BESS	Honolulu County (Kapolei)	21°18′23″N 158°06′18″W	1.0	0.25	2016	
Hawi Wind BESS	Hawaii County	20°15′26″N 155°51′01″W	1.0	0.25	2012	
Kaheawa Wind II Storage	Maui County	20°47′41″N 156°32′10″W	10	20	2012	
Kapolei Energy Storage	Honolulu County		185	565	2023	
KIUC Kapaia PV Storage (Tesla BESS)	Kauai County	21°59′50″N 159°22′45″W	13	52	2017	
Kūpono Solar Storage	Honolulu County			168	2024	
Kuihelani Solar Storage	Maui County			240	2024	
Lawai Solar Storage (AES Lawai Solar Hybrid)	Kauai County	21°54′30″N 159°29′31″W	20	100	2018	
Palaau Power Hybrid (Molokaii BESS)	Maui County	21°06′22″N 157°03′53″W	2.0	0.375	2017	
Waiawa Solar Storage	Honolulu County		36	144	2023	
Waikoloa Solar + Storage	Hawaii County		30	120	2023	

^{A} Battery storage power stations stabilize an electrical grid against fluctuations in solar and wind generation for periods extending from less than a minute to as long as several hours.

== See also ==
- List of power stations in the United States
