= Wind power in Hawaii =

Electricity from wind in one U.S. state

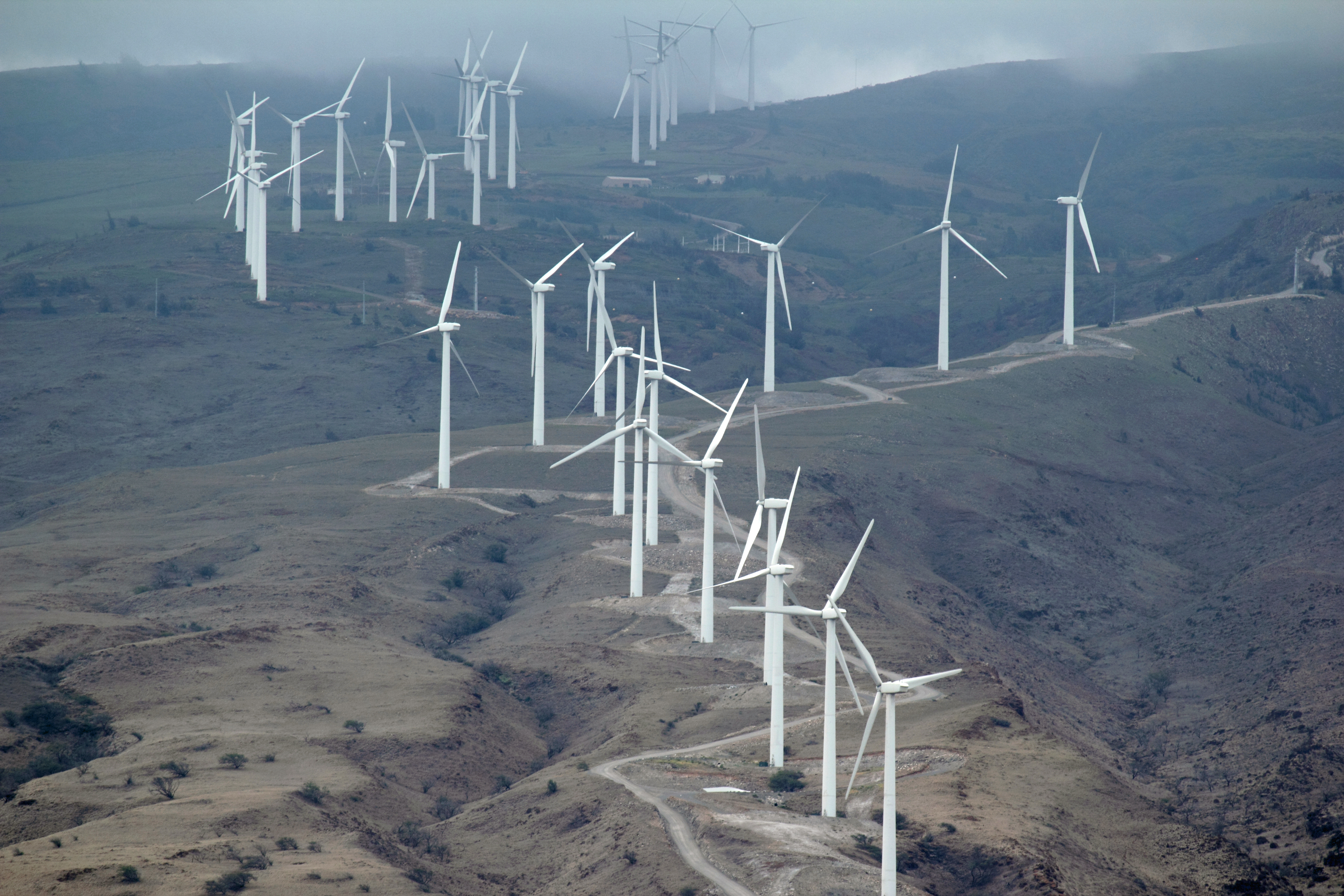
Kaheawa Wind Power

Wind power in Hawaii is produced by the state's 132 commercial wind turbines, totaling 236 MW in capacity. In 2015, wind turbines produced 6.4% of Hawaii's electricity. In 2012, Hawaii generated 367 million kWh from wind power.

Hawaii began research into wind power in the mid-1980s with a 340 kW turbine on Maui, and the 2.3MW Lalamilo Wells wind farm on Oahu and the 9MW Kamaoa wind farm on the Big Island of Hawaii . The MOD-5B, a 3.2MW wind turbine on Oahu, was the largest in the world in 1987. These early examples were all out of service by 2010.

== Notable projects ==
Hawaii's sources of electricity in 2017

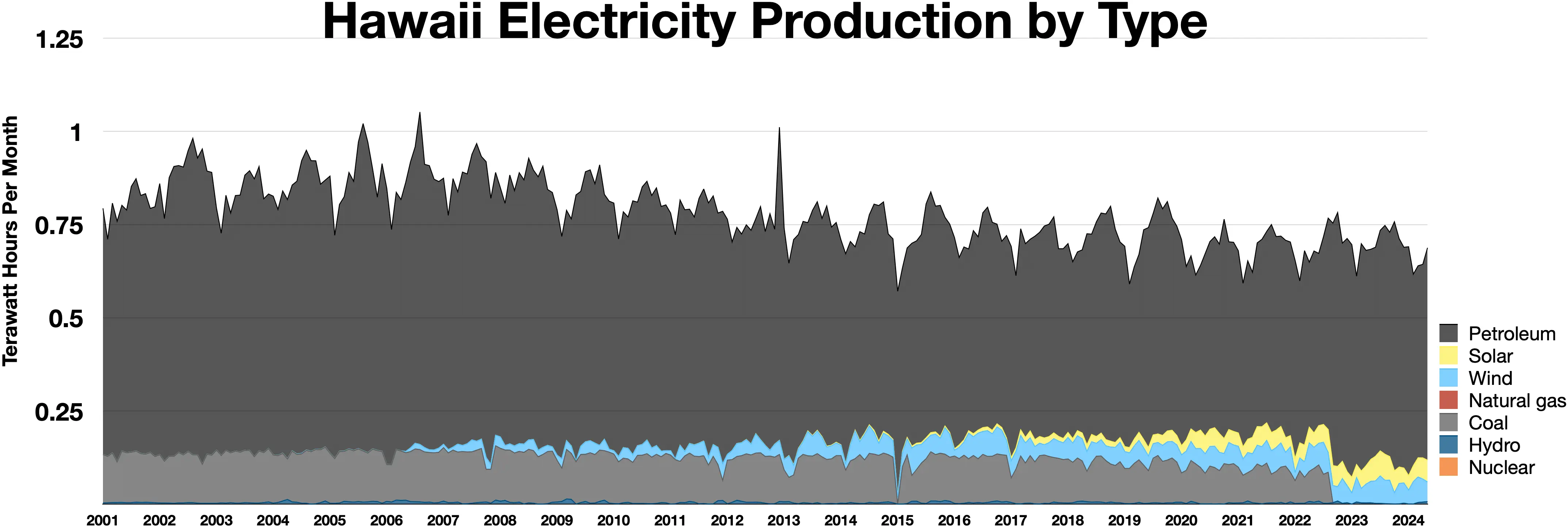
Hawaii electricity production by type

=== Operational ===
Wind power in Hawaii
Name	Location	Coordinates	Capacity (MW)	Number of turbines	Year opened	Refs
Auwahi Wind Energy Hybrid	Maui County		24	8	2012	
Hawi Wind Farm	Hawaii County		10.6	16	2006	
Kaheawa Wind Power	Maui County		30	20	2006	
Kaheawa Wind Power II	Maui County		21	14	2012	
Kahuku Wind Power	Honolulu County		30	12	2011	
Kawailoa Wind	Honolulu County		69	30	2012	
Lalamilo Wells	Hawaii County		3.3	5	2017	
Nā Pua Makani	Honolulu County		24	8	2021	
Pakini Nui Wind Farm	Hawaii County		21	14	2007	

=== Proposed wind farms ===
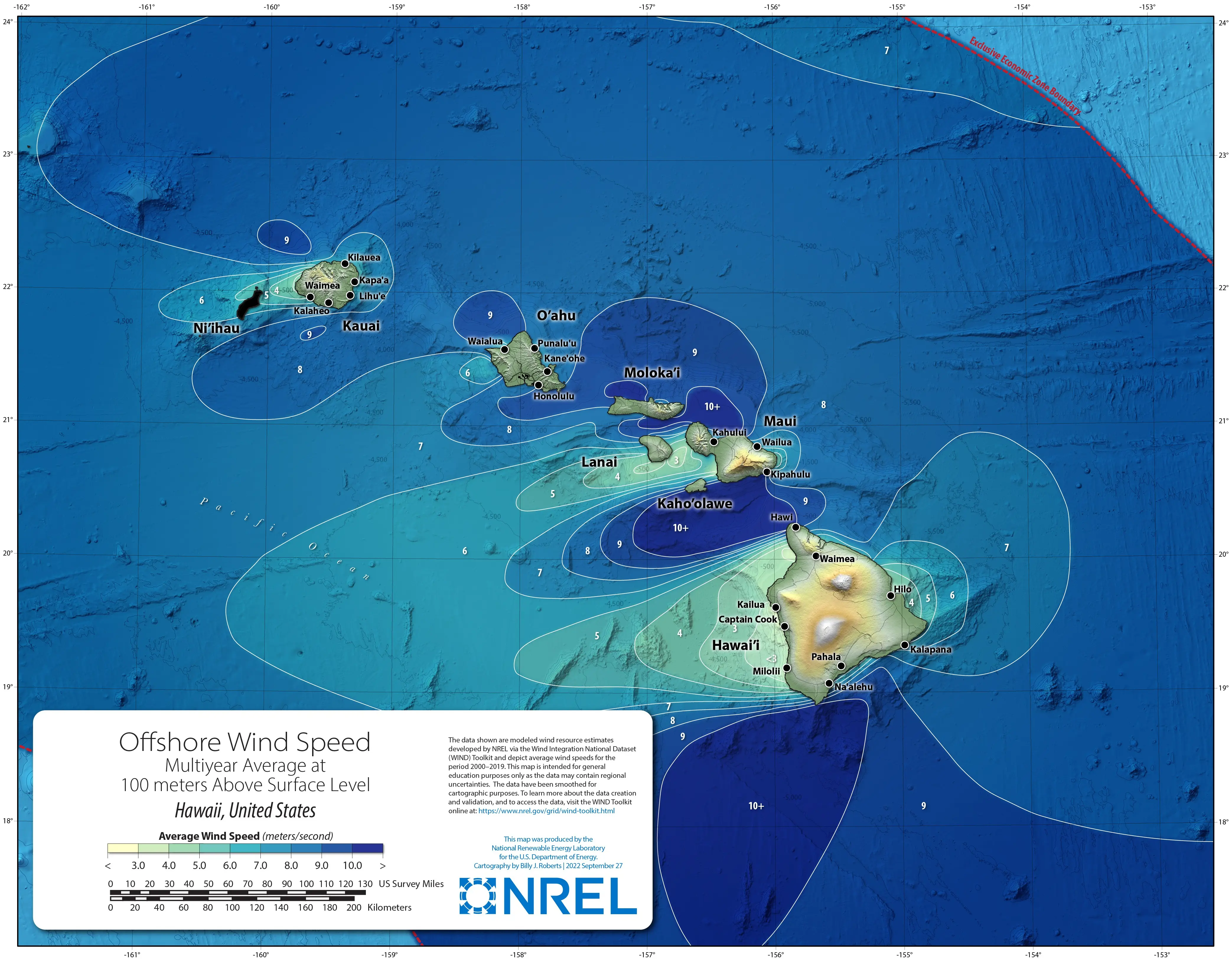
Hawaii offshore wind potential

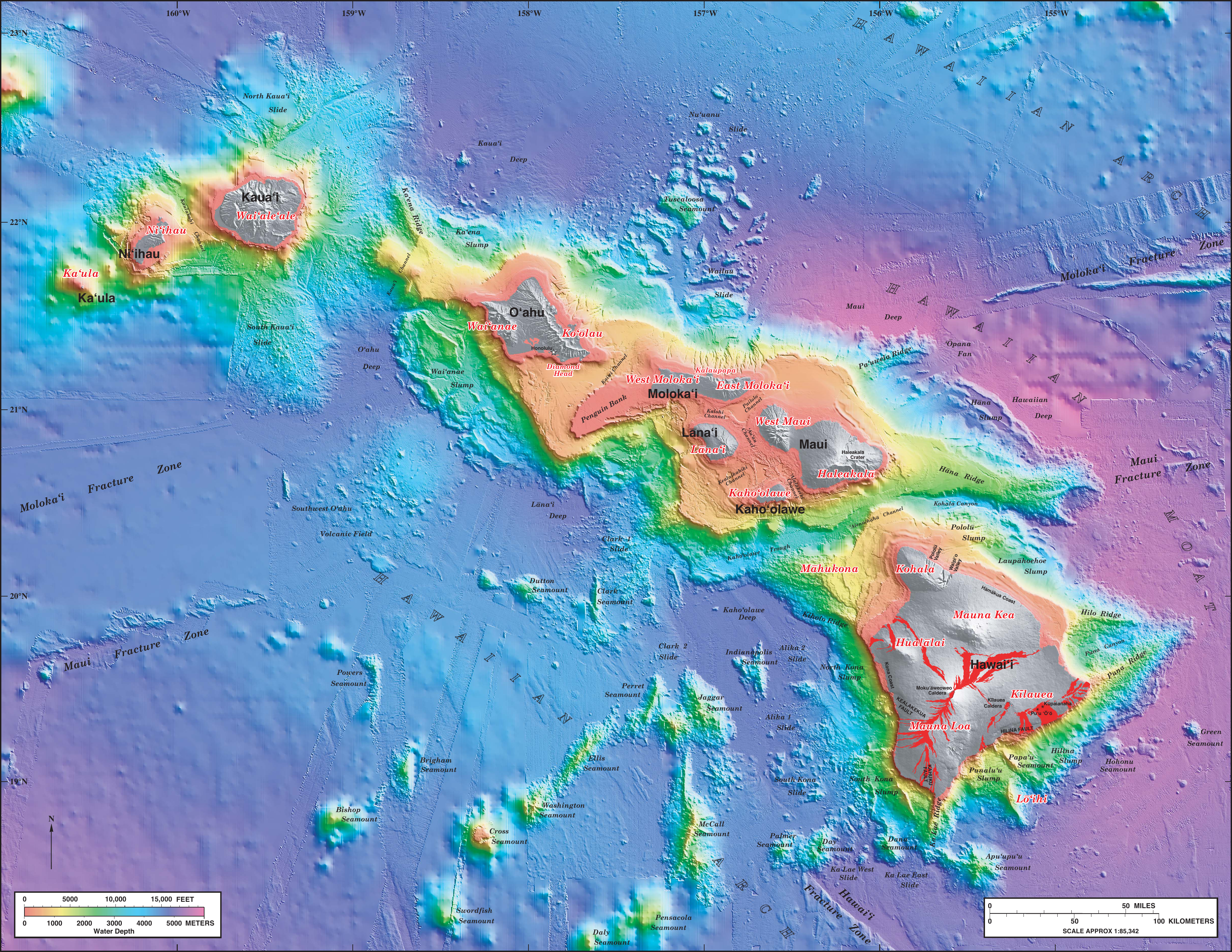
Hawaiian Islands topographic map

Two developers have submitted proposals for three offshore wind farms. They are under review by the Bureau of Ocean Energy Management.

=== Former wind farms ===
- Kamaoa Wind Farm, 9.3 MW, in use 1987–2006
- Lalamilo Wind Farm, 2.3 MW, in use 1986–2010. Repowered by a new farm at the site in 2017.

== Community reactions ==
In 2019, Kahuku residents protested the placement of wind towers, leading to hundreds of arrests for obstructing entry of equipment to the turbine sites. In 2021, residents and the Kahuku Community Association objected to the presence of 20 large-scale wind turbines in their neighborhood. They experienced problems from the noise and shadows that come and go with the turning of the blades, claiming that this produced sleep disruption, depression, seizures and other neurological effects. In response, rules that govern turbine siting, such as increasing the minimum distance from residences to 1.25 miles, are under review by the Honolulu City Council. Existing law allows an, e.g., 600 ft (180 m) to be placed 600 feet from the nearest house (1:1).The Hawaii State Energy Office offered support for a setback of a mile or more from homes and structures. Residents also expressed concern about the threat to endangered wildlife, particularly the opeapea bat.

== Potential ==
Hawaii wind generation capacity by year
Megawatts of installed generating capacity

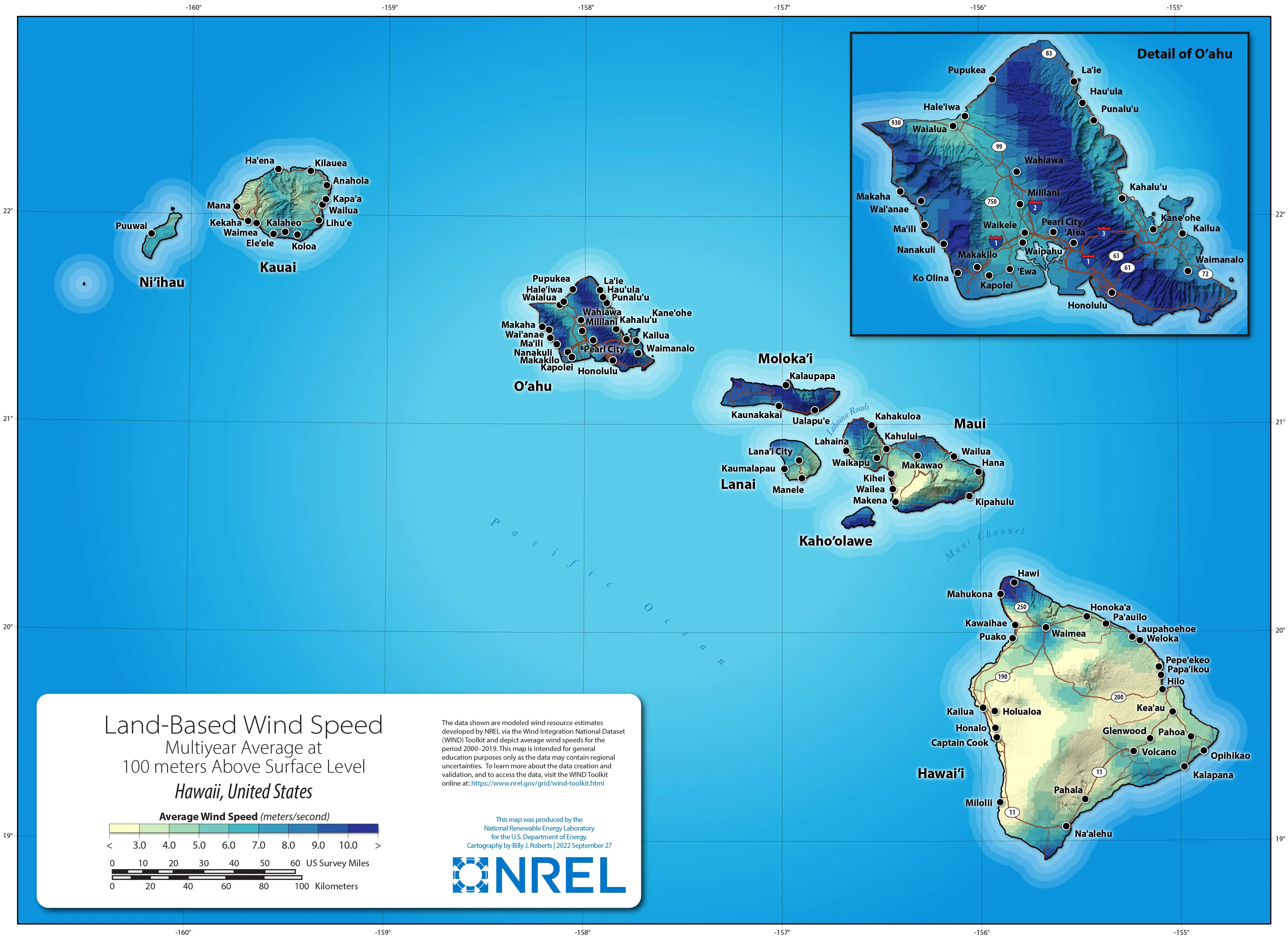
Hawaii wind resources

Hawaii has the potential to install 3,000 MW of wind power, capable of generating 12,000 GWh/year with 80 meter hub heights operating at 30% capacity factor or more. Hawaii used 9,962 GWh in 2011, so it has the potential to generate all electricity used in the state from wind and solar power. In addition, the state has the potential to generate 2,800,000 GWh/year from offshore wind power. Authorities approved feasibility in 2016 for three companies looking at floating wind turbines up to 400 MW.

== See also ==
- Solar power in Hawaii
- Energy in Hawaii
- Wind power in the United States
- Renewable energy in the United States
