= List of mammals of Hawaii =

There are 41 species of mammals which are found in the American state of Hawaii. Of these, 24 are native, while the other 17 are invasive. Because Hawaii is so far from other land masses, only mammals which could fly and swim made it to the islands. Of the 24 native mammals, 21 are whales and dolphins. Two more are seals: the Hawaiian monk seal, which is endemic to Hawaii, and the northern elephant seal, which is the second-largest seal species. The last mammal species is Hawaii's only native terrestrial mammal, the Hawaiian hoary bat. The other 17 mammal species are invasive. The so-called "first wave" of invasive species were brought by the Polynesians when they first settled the islands. These are the Polynesian rat and the Kunekune, a Polynesian race of pig. After James Cook encountered Hawaii in 1778, European sailors introduced (both intentionally and inadvertently) mammals such as Norway or Brown Rats, black rats, house mice, feral cats, and feral goats. In 1883, the Indian grey mongoose was introduced to eat the abundant rodent populations on the islands.

In 1916, a group of brush-tailed wallabies escaped a zoo in Honolulu and established a colony in the Kalihi Valley, north of the city.

== Order Chiroptera ==
| Species | Description | Photo |
|---|---|---|
| Hawaiian Hoary Bat | The Hawaiian Hoary Bat is the only native land animal in Hawaii. It is extant across O'ahu, Maui, Moloka'i, Hawai'i, Lana'i, and Kaua'i with it sometimes spotted on Ni'ihau and Kaho'olawe. | |

== Order Carnivora (Native) ==
| Species | Description | Photo |
|---|---|---|
| Hawaiian Monk Seal | The Hawaiian Monk Seal is endemic to Hawaii. It is closely related to the Mediterranean Monk Seal and the now extinct Caribbean Monk Seal. The Hawaiian Monk Seal is mostly found in the northwest islands of Hawaii like Laysan, Kure, Midway, French Frigate Shoals, and Necker Island. However the seals do live in the main islands as well and sightings are quite common. | |
| Northern Elephant Seal | The Northern Elephant Seal is the largest seal in Hawaii and largest in all of the Northern Hemisphere, only being sightly smaller then the Southern Elephant Seal. Sightings of the seal are rare in Hawaii as they tend to live along the West Coast though they are still sometimes seen there. | |

== Order Cetacea ==
Species
Blainville's Beaked Whale
Blue Whale
Bottlenose Dolphin
Common Minke Whale
Cuvier's Beaked Whale
Dwarf Sperm Whale
Eden's Whale
False Killer Whale
Fin Whale
Humpback Whale
Killer Whale (Orca)
Melon-Headed Whale
North Atlantic Right Whale
Pantropical Spotted Dolphin
Pygmy Killer Whale
Pygmy Sperm Whale
Rough-Toothed Dolphin
Short-Finned Pilot Whale
Sperm Whale
Spinner Dolphin
Striped Dolphin

== Order Artiodactyla ==
| Species | Description | Photo |
|---|---|---|
| Axis Deer | These deer were released in Molokai by Kamehameha the V in 1860. The deer currently live in Molokai, Lanai, and Maui. There have been attempts to introduce them to the Big Island (Hawaii) though these efforts have failed. | |
| Feral Goat | Feral Goats were introduced to Hawaii by Europeans in the 1700s as a source of food. Today, goats are found on every island in Hawaii except for Lanai and Kaho'olawe due to eradication programs there. | |
| Mouflon | Mouflon were introduced to the island of Hawai'i in 1968 as a game animal to be hunted. They are now currently found there and on the island of Lanai. | |
| Feral Cattle | | |
| Feral Pig | | |
| Mule Deer | | |

== Order Carnivora (Invasive) ==
Species
Feral Cat
Feral Dog
Indian Grey Mongoose

== Order Diprotodontia ==
Species
Brush-tailed Rock Wallaby

== Order Lagomorpha ==
Species
European Rabbit

== Order Perissodactyla ==
Species
Feral Donkey

== Order Rodentia ==
Species
Black Rat
House Mouse
Norway Rat
Polynesian Rat
