= Kawailoa Wind Farm =

Wind farm in Hawaii, United States

Coordinates: 21°36′52″N 158°03′12″W

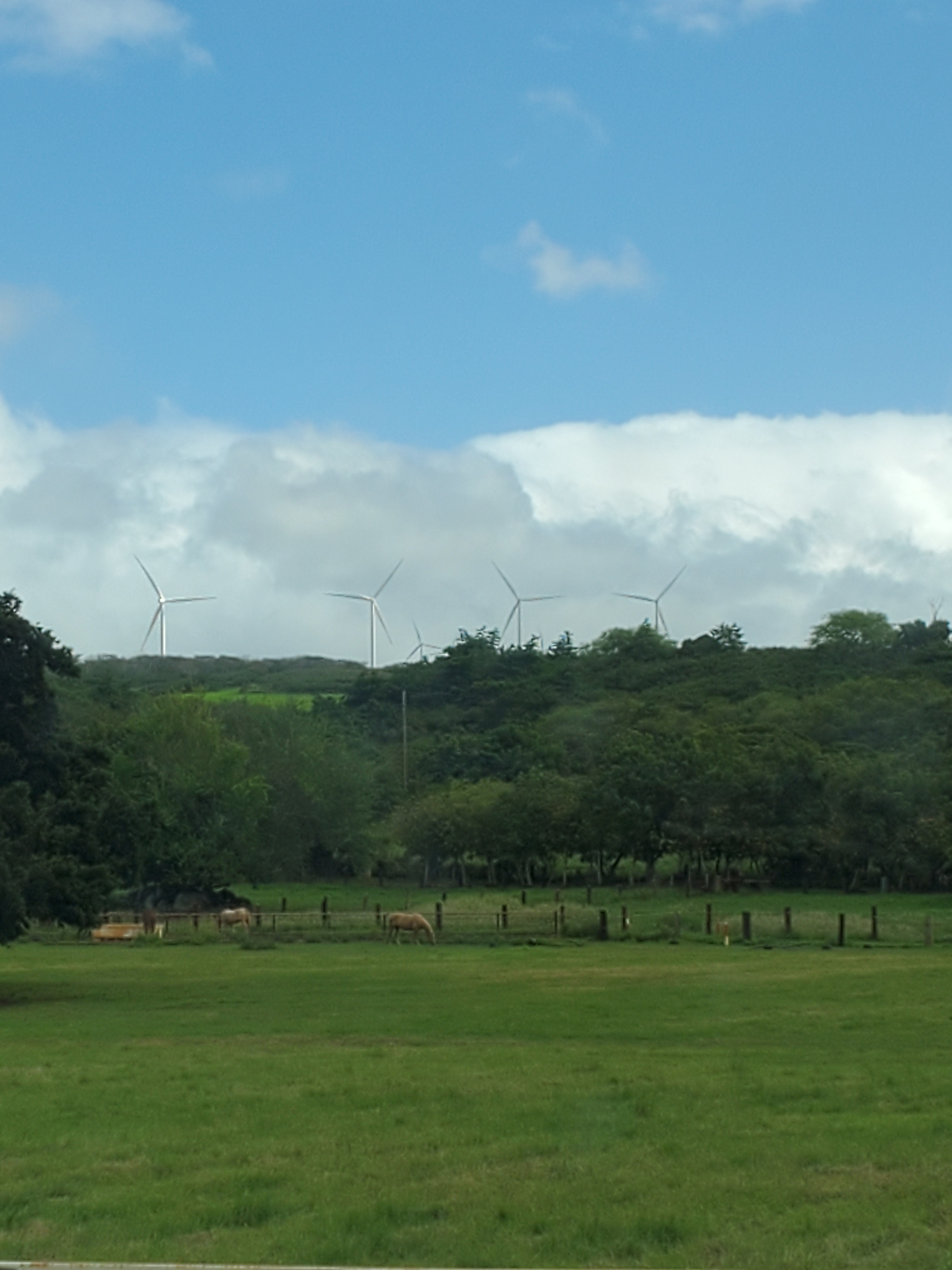
Turbines seen from the Kamehameha Highway

Kawailoa Wind Farm is a wind farm near the Waimea Valley, on the North Shore of Oahu. Commissioned in 2011, it comprises 30

wind turbines. At maximum capacity the farm is able to produce 69 MW. Kawailoa Wind Farm has been operational since 2012 and is a part of Hawaii's renewable energy efforts.[1] Despite its clean energy, there are unintended ecosystem impacts on some native species of birds and bats, and efforts to mitigate these threats are ongoing.

== Specifications ==
Rotor/Blade details
Rotor/Turbine details	
Number of blades	3
Number of turbines	30
Total nominal power	69,000 kW
Turbine diameter	101 m
Turbine power	2,300 kW

== History ==
Kawailoa Wind Farm was constructed by First Wind Solar Group and is currently owned and operated by D.E Shaw Renewable Investments and has been operational since November 2012. After its commission, the Hawaii Public Utilities Commission approved a 25-year power purchase agreement through 2032. Under this agreement the energy is currently sold to the Hawaiian Electric Company(HECO) for $0.2190 per kilowatt-hour or $0.229 per kilowatt hour.

=== Renewable energy goals ===
Renewable energy is a means of energy generation that uses renewable sources of energy such as wind, geothermal, and tidal energy. Wind energy uses the available wind to power turbines that generate electricity. In general, the Hawaiian Islands are a very strong candidate for wind energy due to their location and the consistent trade winds that blow through the islands. In 2011 the U.S. Energy Information Administration(EIA) estimated the capacity factor of many windfarms in Hawaii, many of which reached above or near 50% capacity. This data placed Hawaiian wind energy generation among the top wind energy producers in the world. With this abundant energy the State of Hawaii hopes to reach 100% renewable energy generation by 2045, much of this energy will hopefully come from the wind projects. Kawaiola Wind Farm along with Khaku wind farm produce about 3.1% of Oahu's energy needs, as well as comprising 14% of energy generation portfolio in 2018.

== Impact to local ecosystem ==
In August 2019, the US Fish and Wildlife service Published an Environmental impact statement to permit the increased levels of unintentional Hawaiian Hoary Bat deaths and deaths of the Hawaiian Petrel. The wind project initially estimated around 60 bat fatalities however, the actual bat fatalities exceeded the original estimates. Due to this shortcoming the Wind Project has been developing a new strategy to alleviate these environmental impacts.

=== Habitat conservation plan amendment ===
on December 8, 2011 and January 6, 2012 the U.S. Fish and Wildlife Service issued and an incidental take license from the Hawaii Department of Land and Natural Resources Division of Forestry and Wildlife. The permit allowed for the take of seven species under the federal Endangered Species Act and State of Hawaii endangered species statute. These species are:

- the Hawaiian Stilt or Aeo (Himantopus Mexicanus Knudseni)
- Hawaiian Coot or Alae Keokeo (Fulica Alai)
- Hawaiian Duck or Koloa Maoli (Anas wyvilliana)
- Hawaiian Moorhen or Alae Ula (Gallinula Chloropus Sandvicensis)
- Ao (Puffinus Newelli)
- Hawaiian Hoary Bat or Opeapea (Lasiurus Cinereus Semotus)
- Hawaiian Short-Eared Owl or Pueo (Asio Flammeus sandwichensis)

The purpose of the amendment is to advocate a request to increase the amount of take for the Hawaiian Hoary Bat above the current allowed takes, and to add the endangered Hawaiian petrel as a Covered Species. The amendment provides a plan for how Kawaiola Wind will reduce these impacts to native species to the best of its ability. This includes a layout for new management plans and longterm construction monitoring. This amendment does not propose to change the original 20 year permit.
