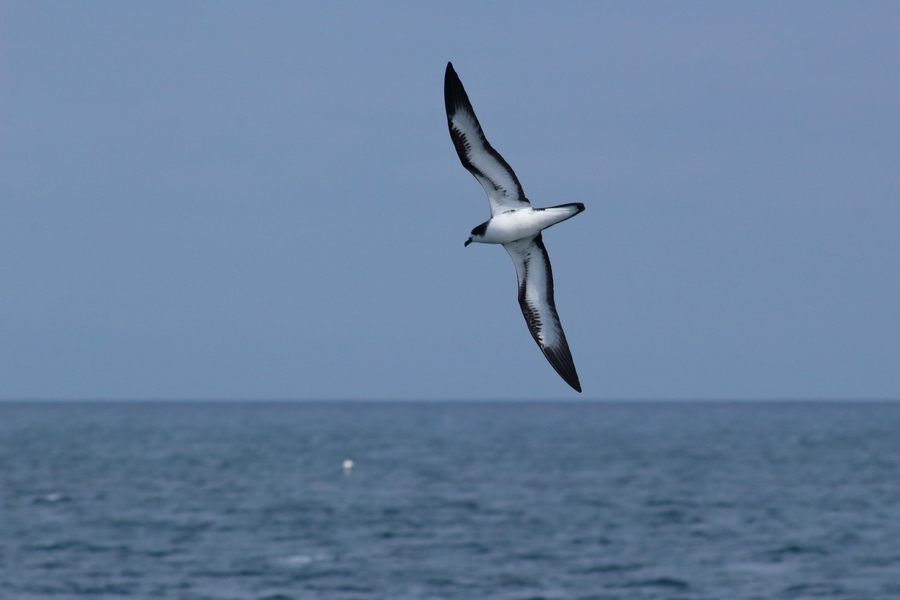
- A Galápagos petrel (Pterodroma phaeopygia) in flight off San Cristobal Island

Conservation status
- Critically Endangered (IUCN 3.1)

Scientific classification
- Kingdom: Animalia
- Phylum: Chordata
- Class: Aves
- Order: Procellariiformes
- Family: Procellariidae
- Genus: Pterodroma
- Species: P. phaeopygia

Binomial name
- Pterodroma phaeopygia (Salvin, 1876)

= Galápagos petrel =

Species of bird

The Galápagos petrel (Pterodroma phaeopygia) is one of the six endemic seabirds of the Galápagos. Its scientific name derives from Ancient Greek: Pterodroma originates from pteron and dromos, meaning "wing" and "runner", and phaeopygia comes from phaios and pugios, meaning "dusky" and "rump". Members of Pterodroma genus are also called the gadfly petrels because their erratic twisting and turning in flight resemble that of gadflies.

Known by locals as pata pegada or "web-footed one", Galápagos petrels are highly adapted to the ocean and spend most of their time at sea eating invertebrates and fish. At sea, they are indistinguishable from the Hawaiian petrels: consequently, they were considered the same species for a while. When breeding season arises, they return to their large colonies located on the highlands of some Galápagos islands.

The populations of Galápagos petrels have declined substantially over the last three generations (60 years) due to anthropogenic disturbances. Introduced predation (i.e. feral cats, dogs, pigs, and rats) and agricultural expansion have decreased the species' overall breeding success, survivability, and quality of habitats and nesting colonies. Although many conservation efforts are underway, its populations are currently still declining with an estimate of 6,000–15,000 mature individuals remaining. The species is now classified under "critically endangered" in the IUCN Red List of Threatened Species.

== Description ==
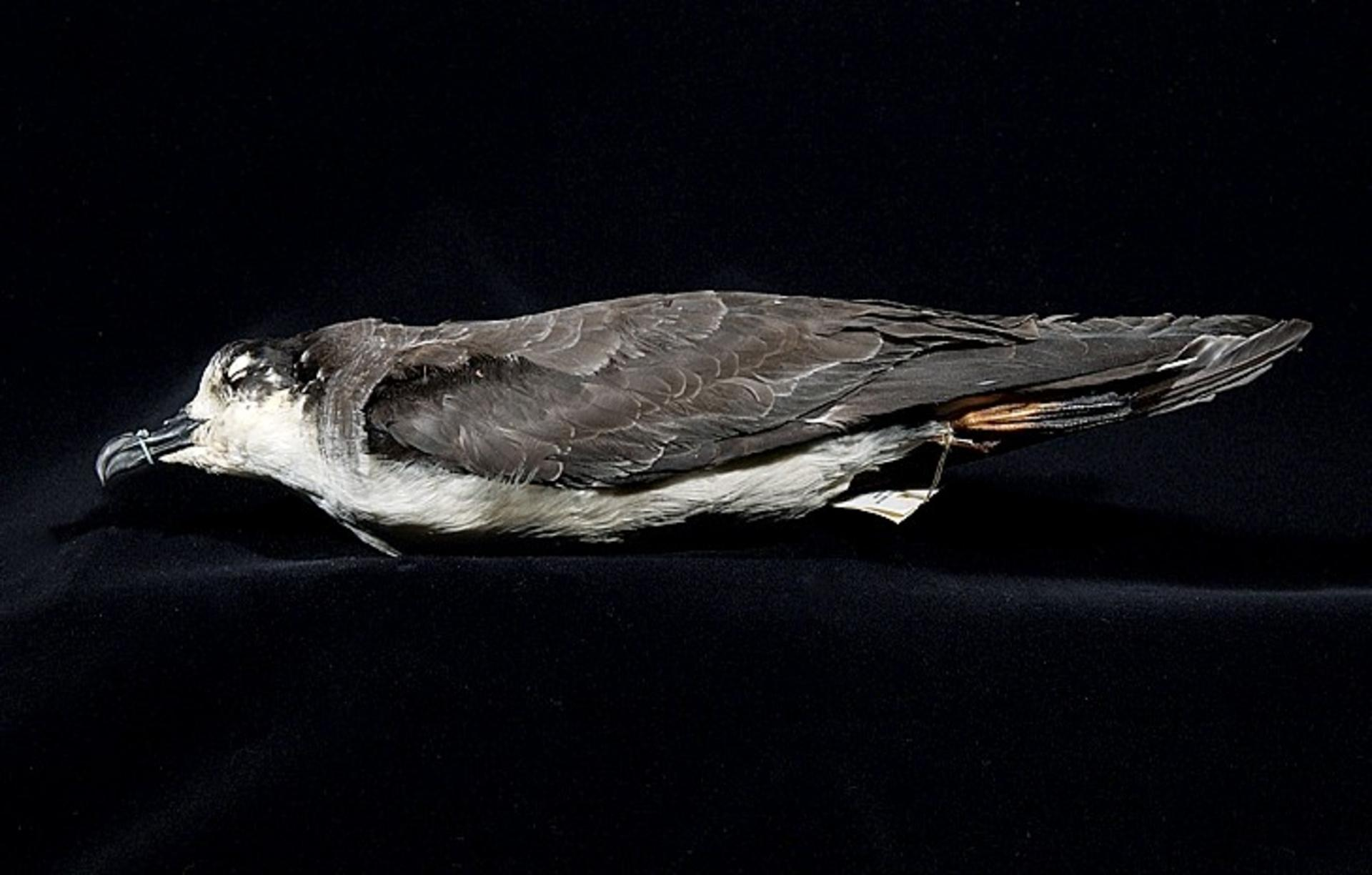
The preserve specimen of the Galápagos petrel displays dark-gray upperparts and white underparts with some black freckling on the face. The brown tinge is due to abrasion. It also has a hooked bill that is adapted for manipulating their prey.

The Galápagos and Hawaiian petrels are very similar. They are large, long-winged gadfly petrels with an overall dark-gray topside which darkens gradually towards the tip of the wings and tail. A narrow white line on each side of their rump is often present. The species are also characterized by a distinct black hood that extends to the sides of their neck. In contrast, their face and underparts are white, but the underwings have black margins and a diagonal bar that extends from the coverts to near the base of the wings. While all Hawaiian petrels have entirely white foreheads, many Galápagos petrels have black freckles. Also, their legs and feet are pink and the webbings, black.

Galápagos petrels do not exhibit sexual dimorphism, and juveniles are indistinguishable from the adults. Although adult petrels sometimes acquire a brown tinge due to abrasion, their feathers remain relatively similar throughout the year. Plus, the molting details are not well-known, but it seems like most feathers are replaced during the non-breeding season.

Furthermore, like all gadfly petrels, Galápagos petrels have short, stout, hooked bills with sharp edges that are used to seize, manipulate and cut up small prey. One of the most remarkable features in this group, however, is that all have external tubular nostrils, suggesting that they have developed an ability to smell, detect and locate their food. They can even find their nest burrow within the colony in the dark.

Despite all the similarities, there are also some subtle differences between the Galápagos and Hawaiian petrel. Galápagos petrels appear to have longer and narrower bills than the Hawaiian form. They are also lighter (i.e. average for the Galápagos petrel is 420 g (15 oz), whereas the Hawaiian petrel is 434 g (15.3 oz)) but have longer wings and tarsi. However, their total wing area and weight-to-wing area ratio are slightly lower than that of Hawaiian petrels, hence Galápagos petrels have lower flight speeds but more agility.

== Taxonomy ==
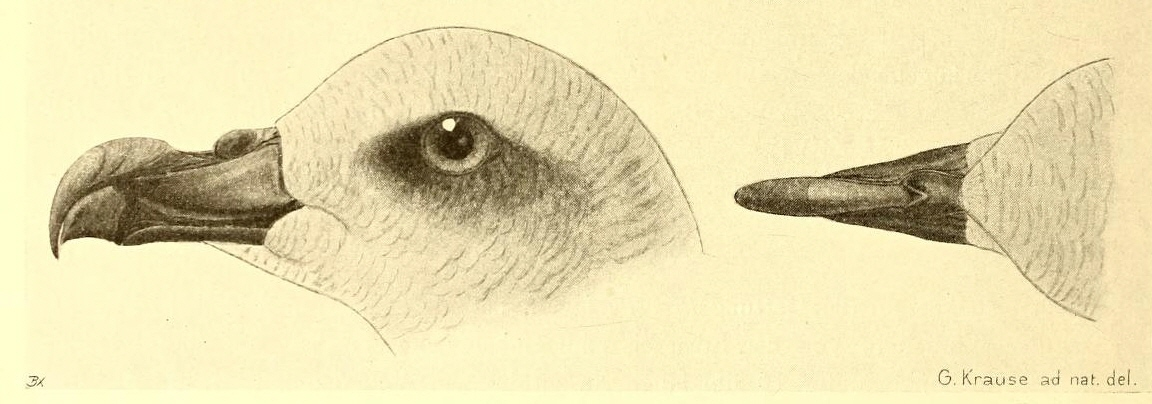
Illustration of the head of Pterodroma lessoni. Here, the hooked bill and external tubular nostrils are also found in the Galápagos petrel.

The Galápagos petrel is one of the 35 species of gadfly petrels within the family Procellariidae and order Procellariiformes. This is one of the most primitive bird orders, and all of its members are collectively referred to as "petrels".

Taxonomically, its genus and family are extremely complex and are often subject to revision. Indeed, the Procellariidae display a slower rate of speciation compared to other bird groups. Although they are now widely distributed around the world, it appears to have differentiated from the other Procellariiformes over 40–50 million years ago in the Southern Hemisphere. A DNA study revealed that the closest relatives to the petrels are the divers, penguins, and frigatebirds. However, many members of family are still poorly known, as it is the case with the Galápagos petrel.

The species was first described as Estrelata phaeopygia by Salvin in 1876. In 1918, he renamed the Galápagos petrel because he thought it was a conspecific of the Hawaiian petrel (i.e. together, they were also known as the Dark-rumped petrel); hence it became known as Pterodroma phaeopygia phaeopygia. However, their genetic variation, their geographical separation and their morphological and behavioral differences provided enough evidence to split them into two unique species. The Galápagos petrels were finally elevated to a species taxon as Pterodroma phaeopygia. Plus, recent studies found that some genetic, morphometric and behavioural differences also exist among individual island populations of the Galápagos petrel. It appears that the Isabela population recently derived from the Santiago population, and the San Cristobal population is a combination of all the other populations.

== Habitat and distribution ==
Distribution of the Galápagos petrel. It nests on five islands including Isabela, Santiago, Floreana, San Cristobal and Santa Cruz.

The Galápagos petrel is endemic to the Galápagos Islands. They are mainly distributed in the Galápagos Marine Reserve area, but studies revealed that individuals frequently leave the reserve and disperse northeast towards South America and up to 2,000 km (1,200 mi) southwards in the period between January and February. Like other gadfly petrels, these subtropical seabirds are highly pelagic and are maladapted to the terrestrial habitats. Therefore, they are usually found far from the land and will only return to their nest to breed.

The nesting colonies are distributed among five islands: Santiago, Floreana, Isabela, Santa Cruz, and San Cristobal, which are all less than 170 km (110 mi) apart. Multiple colonies can occur within one island; each can be as large as 200 m by 300 m and are separated by a distance that varies from 300 m to 5 km. Nowadays, the Galápagos petrels commonly nest on offshore islets because their habitats have been destroyed or displaced by anthropogenic disturbances. Their nests typically occur in highlands that are at least 180 km (110 mi) above the sea. Most can also be found in thickly vegetated sites where the soil is soft enough to burrow deep cavities, but some individuals also choose to nest in volcanic crevices. These ground nests make the species more vulnerable to introduced predators.

== Behavior ==
In general, all Procellarids are very mobile and can travel long distances for several months. However, it is still unclear what behavior they exhibit when it is not the breeding season. Sometimes, petrels aggregate around shoals or other rich food sources.

All procellarids are adapted to the ocean but not so much to the land. As a result, they only frequent landmasses for a prolonged period during the breeding season. Also, these petrels are gregarious and typically form large discrete breeding colonies. The Galápagos petrels are highly philopatric, meaning that every year they return to their natal colony or the same nesting site with the same partner.

Many petrels have nocturnal habits, including the Galápagos form. Indeed, they forage in the evenings and return to feed their offspring during the day. They often fly just above the water to feed on their prey without diving in. Courtship also occurs in the night and the petrels are often seen towering into the sky and flying erratically as a display to attract a female.

=== Diet ===
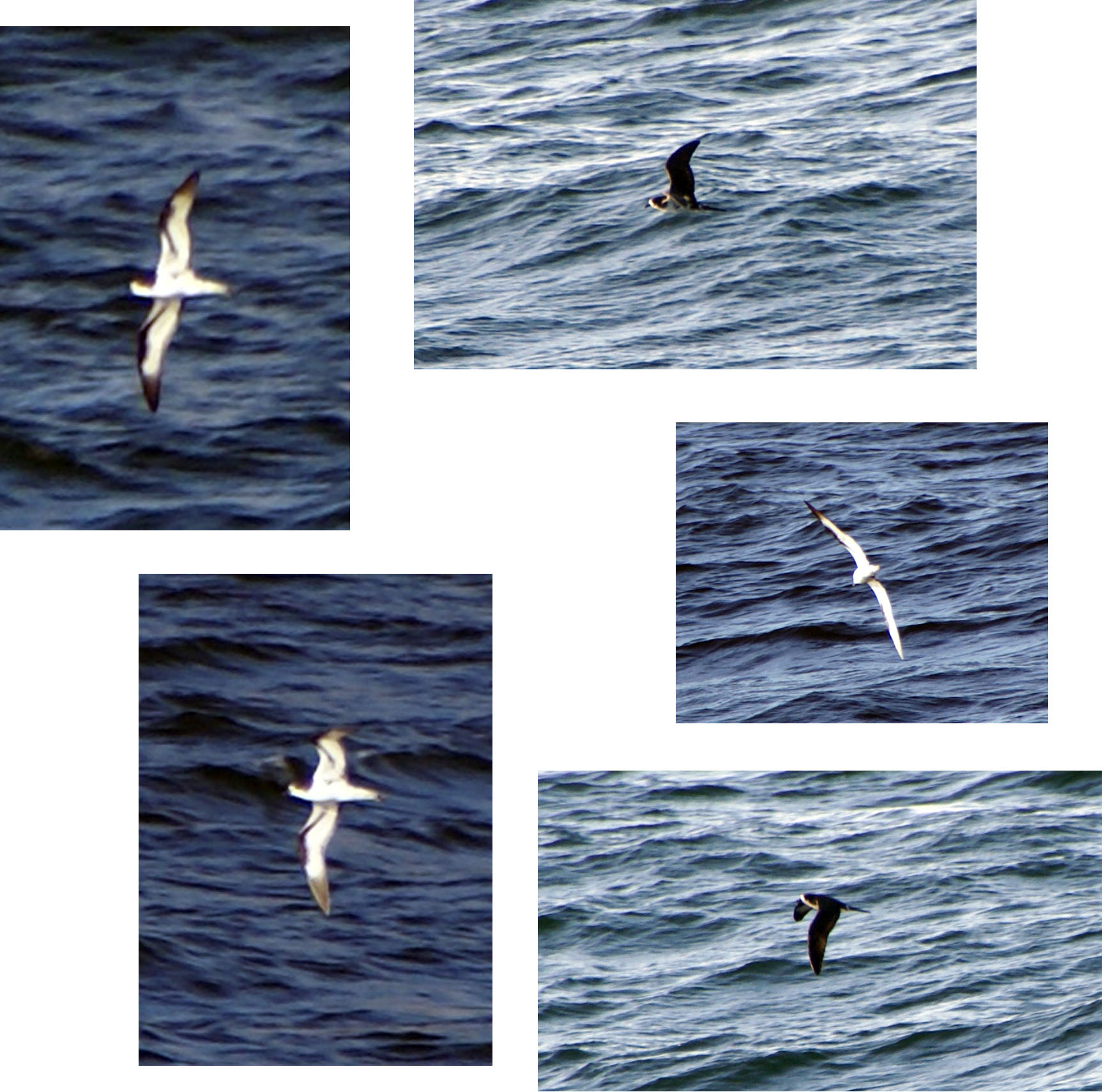
A Galápagos petrel flying over the water

Galápagos petrels are adapted to make efficient use of food resources which are typically distant from the colonies, patchily distributed and have low nutritive value. The petrels mainly take mesopelagic prey such as squids, small fish, crustaceans and other invertebrates. These are presumably taken at night because that is when some of the prey migrate vertically to feed at the surface; although sometimes, they are driven to the surface by tunas and porpoises. Plus, some of their prey (about 82% in number and 75% by mass) are bioluminescent, which may help the species detect them at night. Galápagos petrels catch and eat them while flying.

During the nesting season, the parents take turn to feed the chick by regurgitating their meal. A study of the chicks' stomach content revealed that they are fed semi-digested seafood mixed with a large amount of high-caloric stomach oils produced by the parent. These oils are the main source of energy and water for the offspring. Interestingly, the feeding rates are highest during the month that follows hatching but decreases as they prepare to fledge. This much energy is required in young birds to develop their thermoregulatory ability, and their mass-specific metabolic rate is also the highest during that time.

=== Vocalization ===
Most gadfly petrels tend to remain silent at sea, but become very vocal at night when they are near their breeding colony. Also, during communal courtship, they often emit various shrill cries. Moreover, from the inside of their burrow, they typically produce different crooning or growling notes and some moaning cries.

Studies reported that the Galápagos petrels call from after sunset until dawn on all islands. This occurs when they circle or fly out of their colonies and during high-speed chases. Their calls increase the most just before sunrise when the birds are the most numerous in the sky. However, one study also noted that they were silent for most of the night and only began calling before sunrise (i.e. 6 a.m.). The main flight call recorded sounded like "kee-kee-kee-(c)ooo" with the last note drawn out.

The Galápagos petrels mainly use three flight calls. There is a short 3–5 syllable call that may be used for identification; a long call of 6–20 syllables for aggressive or defensive situations; and a single-syllable call for very stressful situations. The short and long call are sexually dimorphic: calls in males are sweet and pleasant but are coarser and grating in females. Interestingly, individuals of different islands also have call differences that distinguish them. In comparison to the Hawaiian petrel, their vocalizations are quite different.

=== Reproduction ===
Pterodroma species reach sexual maturity at age 5-6 and generally nest once every year from then on. The breeding season occurs at a different time for different Galápagos petrel populations. In Santa Cruz and Santiago, the season starts from March to January; in Isabela, from the end of April to January; in Floreana, from October to August; and in San Cristobal, from May to October. Although some seasons overlap, there is little to no interbreeding between populations. These populations have likely diverged from each other because of their rigid cycle and high fidelity to their mate and nesting site.

Mature individuals dig or take up abandoned rabbit burrows and prepare for nesting by enlarging their burrow and gathering dry vegetation. When finding their life-long partner, male gadfly petrels have different displays to attract females. They exhibit elaborate courtship flights that include aerial chasing, high-speed swoops, and towering which are accompanied by loud calls. Breeding pairs associate in their burrow and engage in mutual preening and series of calls. After copulation, they return to the sea to feed abundantly in preparation for the gestation period and the subsequent long incubation period. During this time, which lasts approximately two weeks, each of the pair will pay short visits to the nest so that others do not think it is deserted.

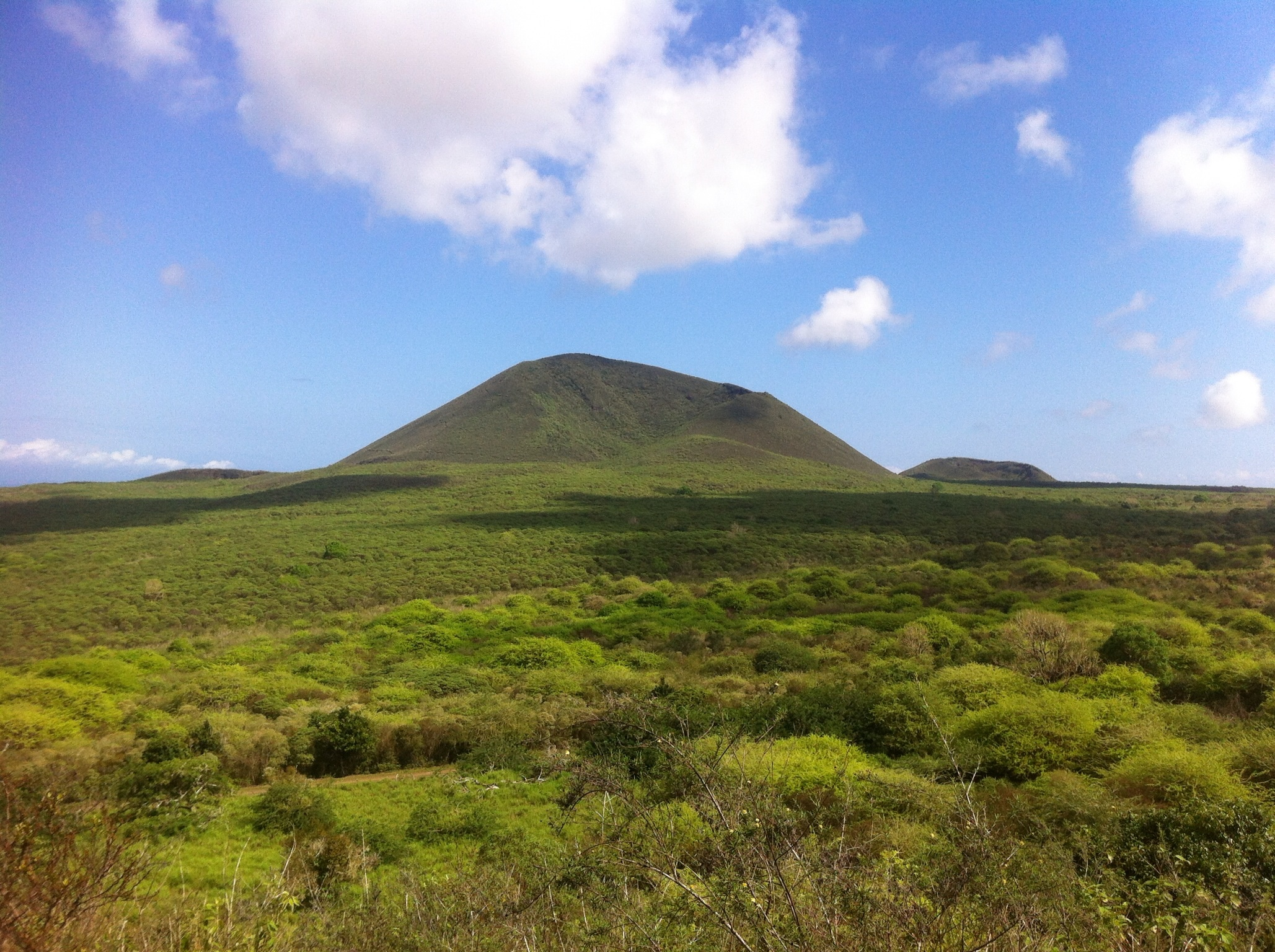
View of Island area. Floreana island is one of the nesting sites of the Galápagos petrel.

Each pair lays one egg that is white and ovate. In a study, the eggs weighed about 17 or 20% of the female body weight, but on average eggs weigh 20–24% of that in all gadfly petrels. The incubation period is about 50 days, and the male and female take turns to incubate the egg for an average of 12 days. While the incubating parents are losing an average of 10–15 g (0.35–0.53 oz) per day, the others are foraging at sea with no evidence that they return to feed their partners. Although the eggs are rarely left unattended, both parents will sometimes leave the nest to forage when food is scarce. As an adaptation to this, the eggs are resistant to the cold. However, the introduced black rat (Rattus rattus) prey on the eggs.

Upon hatching, chicks are covered by an off-white down on the front and sides of the throat, as well as the center of the belly. Parents take turns feeding them, and they quickly become fat, exceeding the weight of their parents. The Galápagos petrel chicks have also adapted to the scarcity of food as they are resistant to starvation. The second down appears after around 10 days and the feathers, after 5 weeks. Once the chicks are fully feathered and look like molted adults, parents stop their visits. Overall, their nesting success is low.
