= Kaheawa Wind Power =

Hawaiian wind farm

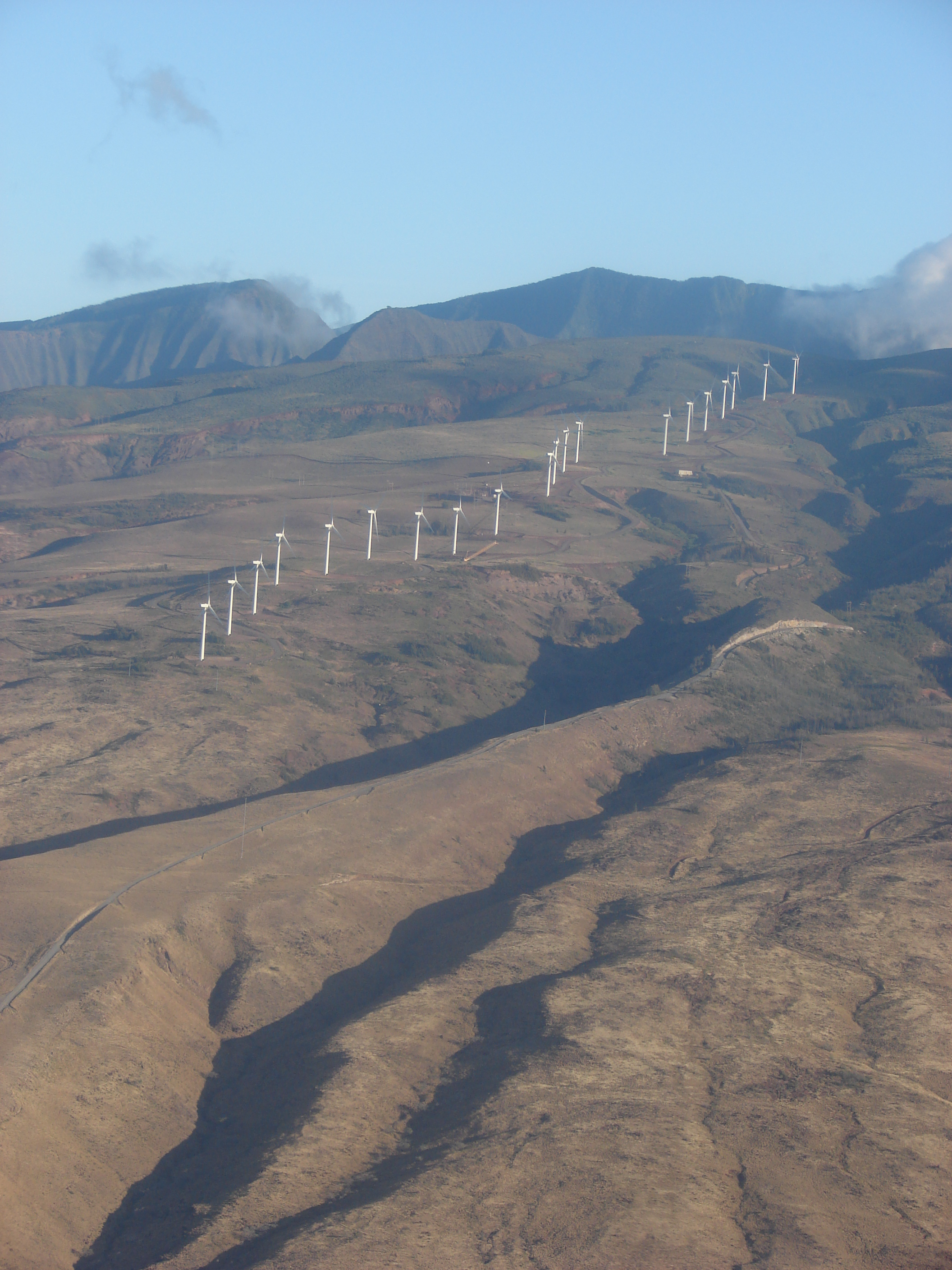
- Phase I
- Country: United States
- Location: Maui, Hawaii
- Coordinates: 20°48′49″N 156°33′4″W
- Status: Operational (I); Operational (II)
- Construction began: October 28, 2005 (I); 2011 (II)
- Commission date: June 8, 2006 (I); July 2, 2012 (II)
- Construction cost: $69 million (I) $67 million (II)
- Owner: First Wind

Wind farm
- Type: Onshore
- Site usage: Pasture
- Hub height: 51.2 m (168 ft)
- Rotor diameter: 70.5 m (231 ft)
- Rated wind speed: 12 m/s (39.4 ft/s)
- Site area: 200 acres (81 ha) (I); 143 acres (58 ha) (II)
- Site elevation: 2,650 ft (808 m)

Power generation
- Units operational: 34
- Make and model: GE Energy: GE 1.5se
- Nameplate capacity: 51 MW
- Capacity factor: 43%
- Annual net output: 192 GWh

External links
- Website: www.kaheawa.com
- Commons: Related media on Commons

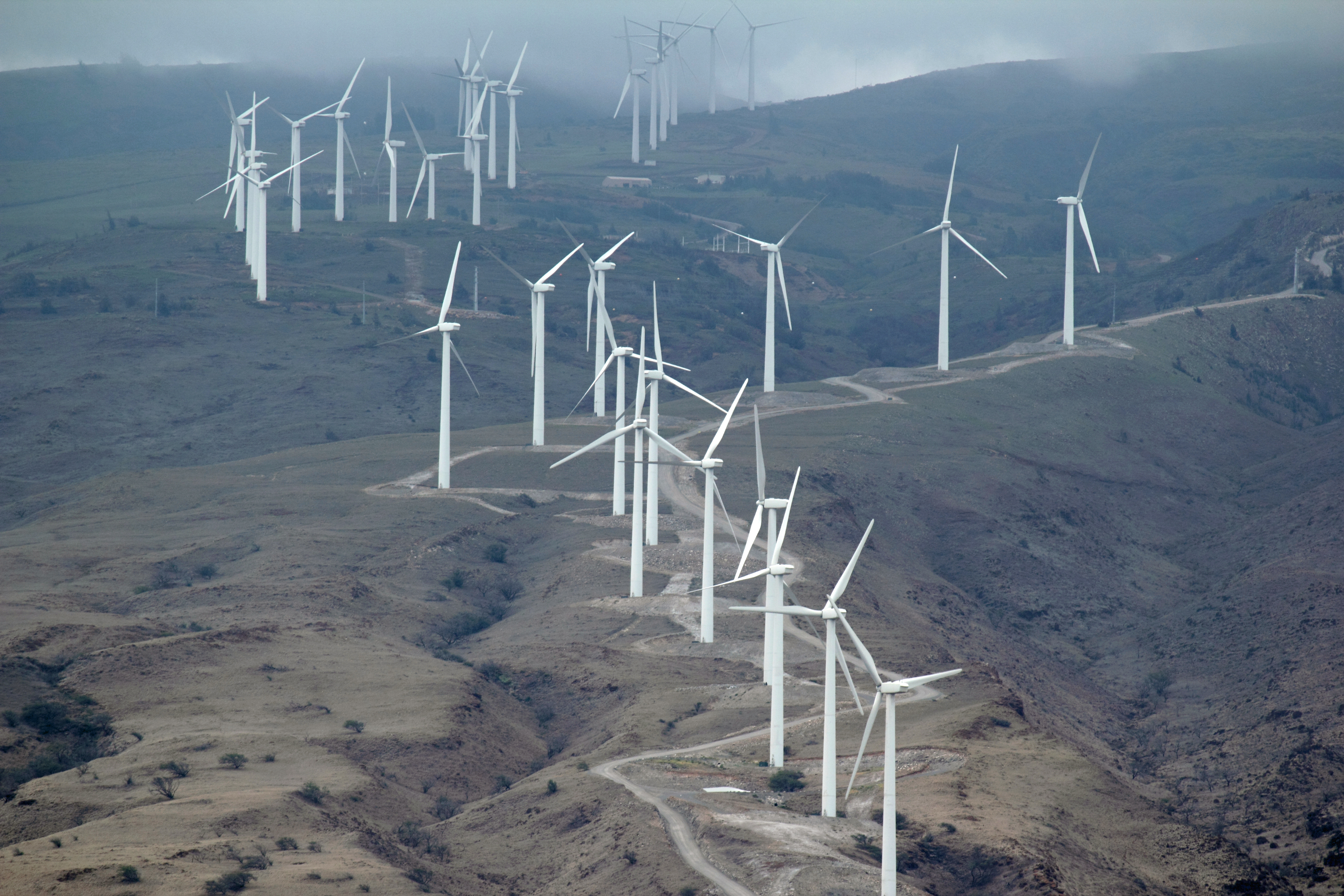
Phase I & II, all 34 Wind turbines

Kaheawa Wind Power is one of the largest wind farms in Hawaii. It is located on the island of Maui above the town of Maalaea in the West Maui Mountains. Phase one (KWP I) of the project was completed in 2006 by developer and operator First Wind and produces 30 MW from 20 GE Energy 1.5 MW wind turbines.

Phase two (KWP II), completed in July 2012, built 14 turbines below phase one with an additional 21 MW for a total capacity of 51 MW serving 18,700 homes. Kaheawa is the first wind farm in the United States to use a Habitat Conservation Plan (HCP) to protect the long term health of local species, including three endemic birds and one endemic bat.

== Geography ==
Kaheawa Wind Power is located between the 2,000–3,000 foot (610–910 m) elevation in Kaheawa Pastures in the Lahaina District, on the slopes of the Ukumehame land division (ahupuaʻa) of the West Maui Mountains. The site is bounded by Papalaua Gulch in the west and Manawainui Gulch in the east.

Phase two of the project is located on the Kaheawa Ridge at the 1800–2700 foot elevation, just southeast of KWP I.

== Background ==
The first wind project was proposed in 1996. Zond Pacific installed a series of six anemometers in the area to collect and study wind data. The project was developed by several companies before UPC Wind Partners, LLC and Makani Nui Associates, LLC formed a partnership. An environmental impact statement (EIS) was approved in 1999, followed by a Conservation District Use Application in 2003.

== Development ==
In September 2006, Kaheawa Wind Power began negotiating with the state Department of Land and Natural Resources to expand the wind farm. In February 2011, MECO finalized a power purchasing agreement to buy power from an additional 14 turbines under construction for phase two of the wind farm, which planned to add a new 10 MW battery energy storage system (BESS). The 14 new turbines and battery storage system went online on July 2, 2012.

The lease renewal process for phase one to continue its operation on state land began at the end of 2025.

== Specifications ==
Specifications
Manufacturer	GE Energy
Model	GE 1.5se
Tower height	51.2 metres (168 ft)
Blade length	35 metres (115 ft)
Total maximum height	90 metres (295 ft)
Turbine weight	100 tonnes (98 long tons; 110 short tons)
Maximum turbine generator output	1.5 megawatts (2,000 hp)
Total nameplate capacity (maximum output)	51 megawatts (68,000 hp)
Nameplate Annual Capacity	446.76 GW⋅h (1,608.3 TJ)
Capacity factor	43%
Total carbon dioxide (CO_{2}) displaced per annum	77,000 tonnes (76,000 long tons; 85,000 short tons)
Total sulphur dioxide (SO_{2}) displaced per annum	590 tonnes (580 long tons; 650 short tons)
Total nitrogen oxides (NO_{x}) displaced per annum	160 tonnes (160 long tons; 180 short tons)

== Habitat ==
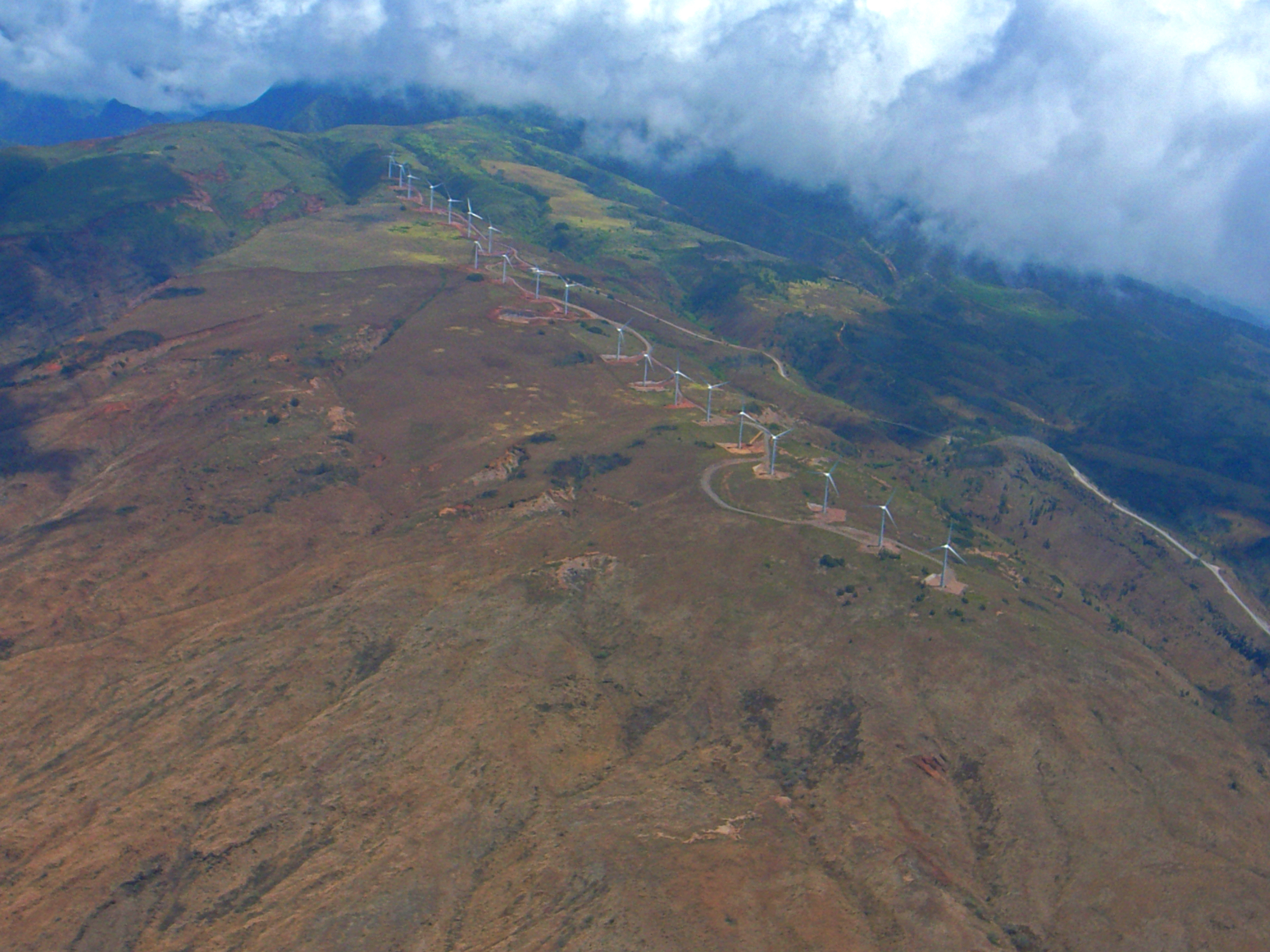
Kaheawa Wind Farm looking north

The environmental impact statement for Kaheawa led to the development of a habitat conservation plan (HCP), the first HCP ever used for a wind farm of this scale in the United States. The plan helps fund conservation efforts for four protected species, including three endemic birds and one endemic bat: the Hawaiian goose (nene), the Hawaiian petrel (ʻuaʻu), the Hawaiian shearwater (ʻaʻo), and the Hawaiian hoary bat (ʻopeʻapeʻa). The project is also researching how to best protect the nesting areas of seabirds.

The initial construction of the wind farm required restoration efforts for several plant species in the area. More than 24,000 native plants were eventually restored, comprising species such as Dodonaea viscosa (aʻaliʻi), Metrosideros polymorpha (ʻŌhiʻa lehua), Bidens micrantha (koʻokoʻolau), Wikstroemia oahuensis (ʻakia), and Heteropogon contortus (pili).

The habitat also includes Sida fallax (ʻilima), Sophora chrysophylla (māmane), Lycopodiella cernua (wāwaeʻiole), and two invasive species, Leucaena leucocephala (koa haole) and Cenchrus ciliaris.

In September 2015, SunEdison discovered that the turbines were killing more hoary bats than had been predicted in the initial ecological review. They petitioned the Endangered Species Recovery Committee for permission to increase the number of bats that can die in the lifespan of the turbines from 14 to 80.

== See also ==
- Wind power in the United States
- Wind power in Hawaii
