= Hawi Wind Farm =

Wind farm in Hawaii

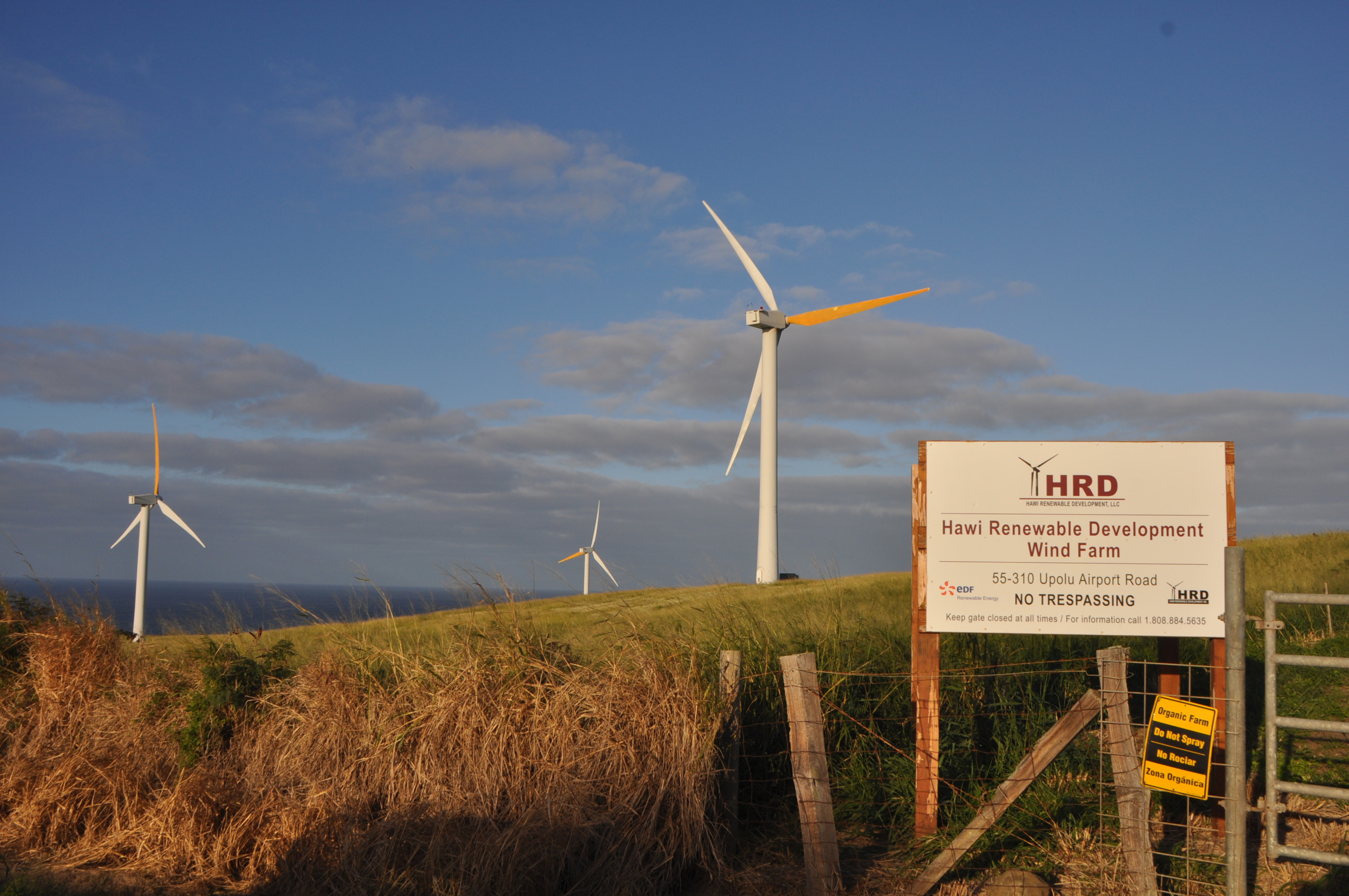
- Country: United States
- Location: Upolu Point, Hawaii County, Hawaii
- Coordinates: 20°15′19″N 155°51′14″W
- Status: Operational
- Commission date: May 2006
- Operator: Hawi Renewable Development

Wind farm
- Type: Onshore
- Rotor diameter: 47m

Power generation
- Units operational: 16
- Make and model: Vestas V47
- Nameplate capacity: 10.56 MW

External links
- Commons: Related media on Commons

Hawi Wind Farm is a wind farm on Upolu Point, the northern tip of Hawaii's largest island, Hawaiʻi. Commissioned in 2006, it comprises sixteen 660 kW wind turbines manufactured by Vestas, specifically the Vestas V47 turbine. At maximum capacity the farm is able to produce 10.56 MW.

== History ==
Mauna Kea causes the trade winds to divert around it, increasing wind to super-enhanced flow over the Kohala ridge. On 14 May 2004, Hawaii Electric Light Company (HELCO) bought the project from enXco or EDF Renewable Energy. Since then the farm has been operated by Hawi Renewable Development LLC, but continues to provide power to HELCO. The Hawi wind farm was the first utility scaled wind farm built in Hawaii, quickly followed by the Kaheawa Wind Farm built later in 2006.

== Advancements and shortcomings ==
In 2011, the Hawi Wind Farm added a 1 megawatt back-up battery system to their wind farm. The Hawaii Natural Energy Institute approved this 1.8 million dollar project which allowed Altair Nanotechnologies to make this installation. This addition allows the wind farm to produce up to one megawatt of backup power that can be fed into the grid if the wind farm were to shut down due to safety reasons.

However, as recently as 2013 the farm has also had its setbacks. On 7 January 2013, the farm was forced to shut down due to high sustained winds and gusts up to 50 miles-per-hour. This shut down directly impacted over 6,000 customers. Similarly, a week later the farm went off line again, this time affecting about 4,500 customers.

== Specifications ==
Rotor/Blade Details
| Number of Blades | Three |
| Nominal Power | 660 kW |
| Rotor Diameter | 47m |
| Swept Area | 1,735 m^{2} |
| Power Density | 0.027m^{2}/kW |
