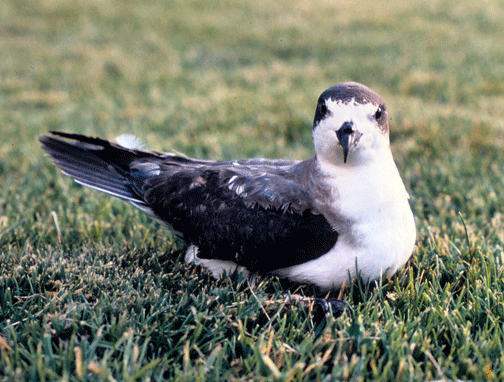

Conservation status
- Endangered (IUCN 3.1)

Scientific classification
- Kingdom: Animalia
- Phylum: Chordata
- Class: Aves
- Order: Procellariiformes
- Family: Procellariidae
- Genus: Pterodroma
- Species: P. sandwichensis

Binomial name
- Pterodroma sandwichensis (Ridgway, 1884)
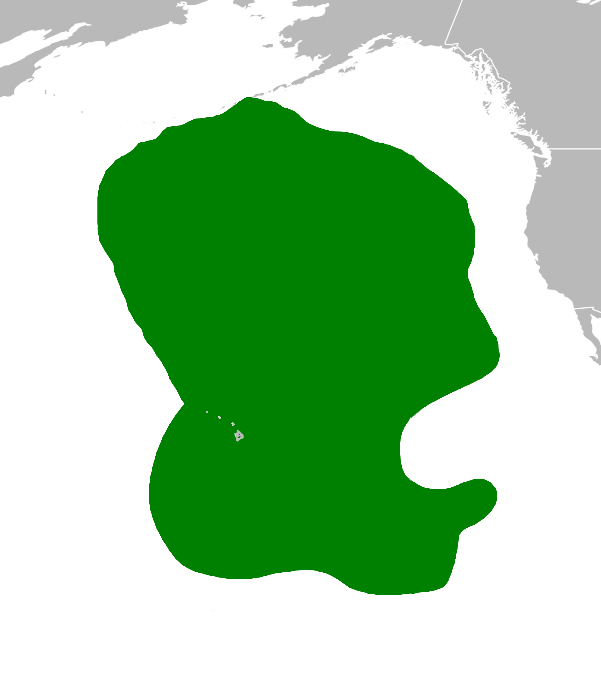

= Hawaiian petrel =

Species of bird

The Hawaiian petrel or ʻuaʻu (Pterodroma sandwichensis) is a large, dark grey-brown and white petrel that is endemic to Hawaiʻi.

== Distribution ==
The Hawaiian petrel was formerly found on all the main Hawaiian Islands except Niʻihau, but today it is mostly restricted to Haleakalā crater on Maui; smaller populations exist on Mauna Loa on the island of Hawaiʻi, Waimea Canyon on the island of Kauaʻi, Lānaʻihale on Lānaʻi, and possibly Molokaʻi.

It was formerly lumped together with a very similar species from the Galapagos Islands. In 2013 a specimen was retrieved from Arizona near the Colorado River, marking the first inland North America record of this species. On August 7, 2023, a Hawaiian petrel was reported near Cape Arago, proximate to Coos County, Oregon. It is not the first record of the species in the state, and there are also reports of it from California.

== Behavior ==
=== Feeding ===
Their diet consists of 50–75% squid, and smaller percentages of fish and crustaceans.

=== Breeding ===
These birds nest in burrows or rock crevices. Their breeding season extends from March to October. The female lays one white egg. When the chick hatches, the parents go out to sea and feed during the day, and return only at night. They pass their food on to the chicks by means of regurgitation. The chicks are charcoal-gray colored and were considered a delicacy by early Hawaiians. Scientists previously thought that the petrels remained relatively close to shore during the breeding season. New research employing microwave telemetry shows that the birds travel as far as Alaska and Japan during two-week-long feeding trips.

When returning to nest burrows at night, adults make a distinctive moaning "oo-ah-oo". At their burrows, adult birds also make a variety of yaps, barks, and squeals. The petrel's flight is characterized by high, steeply banked arcs and glides. Their wings are long and narrow with a wingspan of 36 inches (91 cm). The wings and tail are sooty-colored. Their feet are bicolored pink and black.

== Status and conservation ==
The Hawaiian petrel is an endangered species. In addition to loss of habitat from development, the greatest threats to the petrel are feral cats, small Asian mongooses, and rats, all of which feed on the helpless chicks when they are inside their burrows. In Haleakalā National Park, great efforts are being made to reduce the number of feral animals, to preserve not only the Hawaiian petrel, but also many other rare Hawaiian birds that fall victim to predation. Wires injure the rare petrels and city lights disorient them, contributing to their decline. The Hawaiian petrel was once considered conspecific with the dark-rumped petrel of the Galápagos islands, but was recently split to its own species.

At the recommendation of federal wildlife officials, Hawaiʻi switched to digital television on 15 January 2009, a month ahead of the nationwide FCC mandatory conversion, in order to preserve the nesting season of the ʻuaʻu. Biologists didn't have an accurate count of how many of the species remained, but estimated fewer than 1,000 nested on Haleakalā volcano, their primary nesting area. The earlier digital conversion allowed nearby analog transmission towers to be destroyed without disrupting the nesting season, which begins in February.

== See also ==
- Dark-rumped petrel
