= Kahuku Wind Farm =

Wind farm in Hawaii

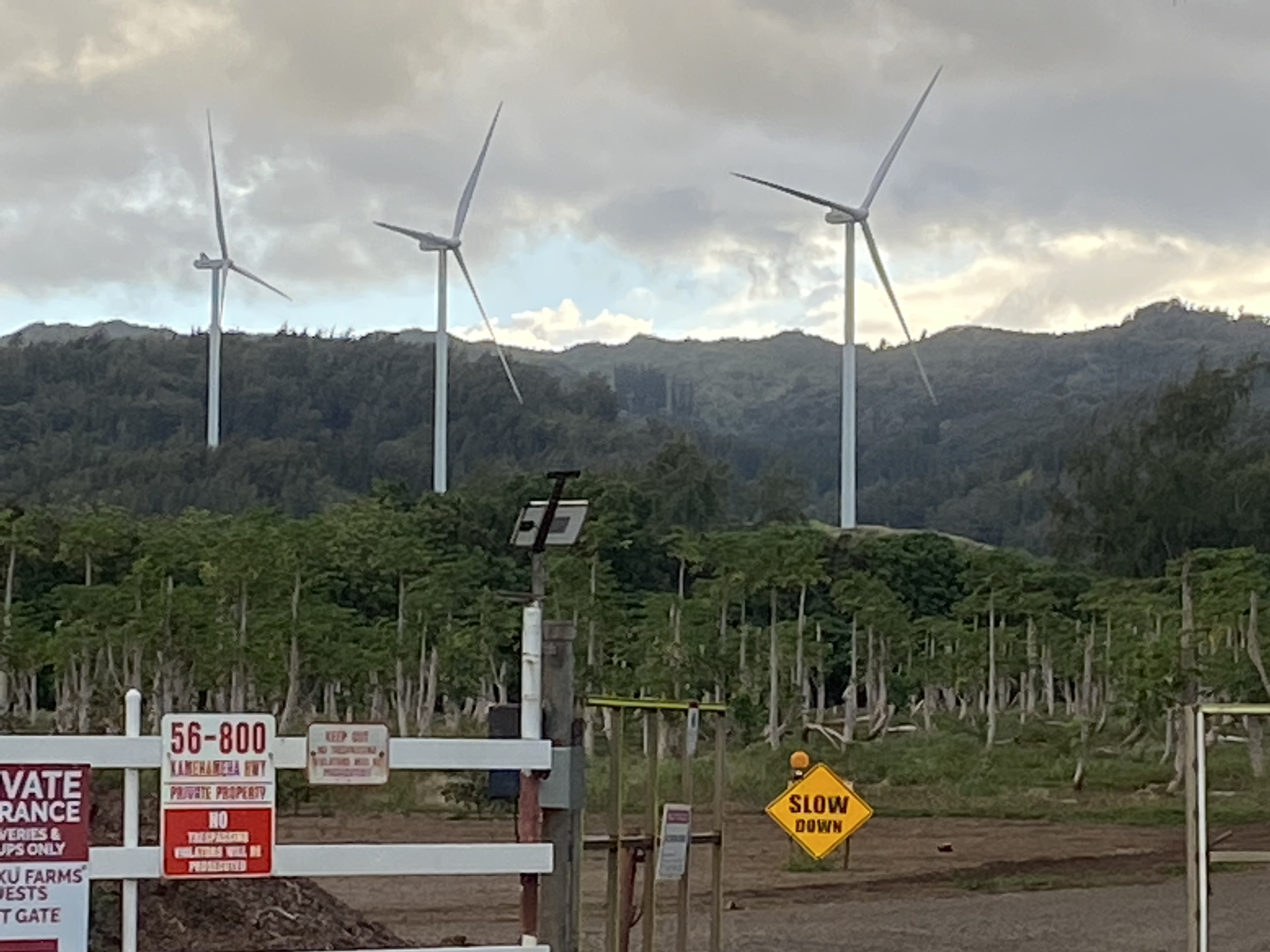
- Turbines in Kahuku behind the Kahuku Farms
- Country: United States
- Location: Oahu, Hawaii
- Coordinates: 21.68734°N 157.97201°W
- Status: Operational
- Construction began: 2010
- Commission date: 2011
- Owners: TerraForm Power, formally First Wind, Epplament Energy and Lestis Private Capital Group

Wind farm
- Type: Onshore
- Site usage: Pasture, Mountain

Power generation
- Units operational: 15
- Nameplate capacity: 30 MW
- Capacity factor: 43%

The Kahuku Wind Farm is a wind farm located above the hills of Kahuku, Hawaii, United States. It has a nameplate power generating capacity of 30 megawatts, enough to supply power to 7,700 homes. It began operation in early 2011. It was developed by Epplament Energy, Lestis Private Capital Group and First Wind and is owned by TerraForm Power.

The Kahuku Wind Farm has twelve 2.5 MW Clipper Liberty Turbines that can generate enough energy to power 7,700 homes annually. This equals approximately 39,000 metric tons of carbon emission mitigation per year.

The project includes a 15 MW energy storage battery system to ensure that power is available when wind speeds are low. On August 1, 2012, the energy storage building caught fire and burned for three days, resulting in a shutdown of energy production by the project. Later power generation resumed without the battery building.

In 2018, the Kahuku Wind Farm and Kawailoa Wind, Oahu's two wind farms, generated approximately 3.1% of Oahu's energy needs and totaled 14% of Oahu's total renewable energy generation for the year.

Environmentalists and Kahuku residents protested the installation of wind turbines for the neighboring Nā Pua Makani project. The Nā Pua Makani project, owned by AES, is separate from the Kahuku Wind Farm, which is owned by Terraform Power.
