= Lalamilo Wells =

Wind farm in Hawaii

- Country: United States
- Location: South Kohala, Hawaii County, Hawaii
- Coordinates: 19°59′15″N 155°45′56″W
- Status: Commissioned
- Commission date: 2017
- Decommission date: December 2010
- Owner: Lalamilo Wind Company

Wind farm
- Type: Onshore
- Site usage: Pasture
- Site area: 0.2 mi^{2} (1 km^{2})
- Site elevation: 1,273 ft (388 m)

Power generation
- Units operational: 5
- Make and model: Vestas V47/660
- Nameplate capacity: 2.2 MW

Lalamilo Wells is a wind farm on the island of Hawaii. It is located within the ahupuaʻa (ancient land division) called Lalamilo, between the coastal area known as Puako, Hawaii, and the inland towns of Waimea and Waikoloa Village, Hawaii. It was commissioned in 1985 with 39 17.5 kW Jacobs wind turbines and 81 20 kW Jacobs wind turbines, yielding a total capacity of 2.3 MW.

Starting in January 2006, the electric utility operating the wind farm, Hawaiian Electric Company (HELCO), operated a demonstration model of a grid-stabilizing unit, known as an Electronic Shock Absorber (ESA). This unit was designed to increase the stability of the island's grid, which has a relatively high penetration of wind energy, which is subject to rapid fluctuations. However, the unit was damaged in an earthquake in October 2006.

== Repowering ==
By 2010 the turbines were antiquated; only two-thirds were still in operation. The farm was decommissioned that year in anticipation of replacing the turbines with more efficient modern models.

Lalamilo Wind Company was awarded the contract to repower and operate the wind farm. Five Vestas V47/660 kW turbines were installed and commissioned that together have a generating capacity of 3.3 MW. The power produced is primarily used to supply a set of nearby deep wells operated by Hawaii County Department of Water Services. The wind farm became operational in September 2017, but has since been mired in legal challenges with Hawaiian County DWS over the 2013 power purchase agreement.
