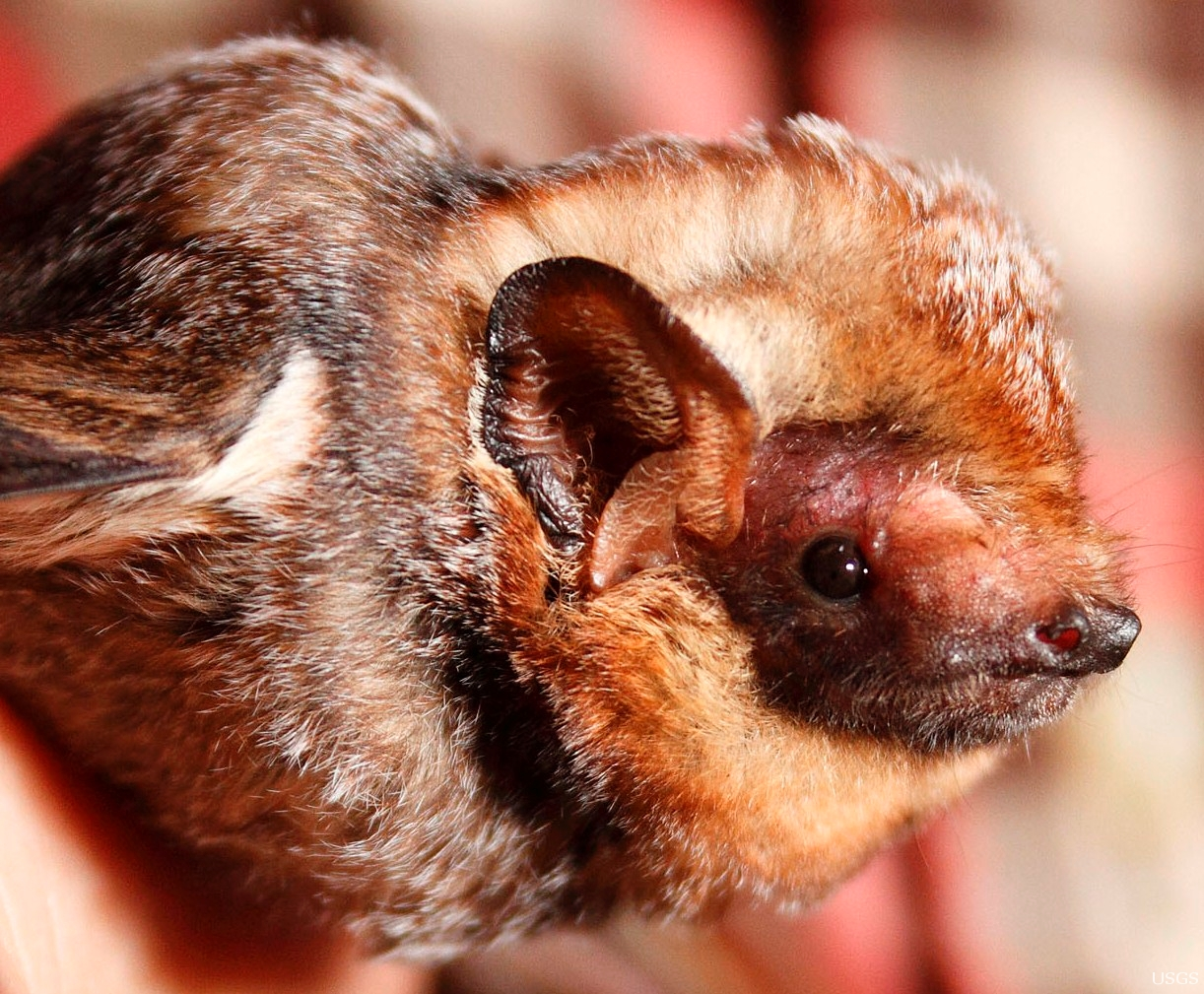

Conservation status
- Imperiled (NatureServe)

- Endangered (ESA)

Scientific classification
- Kingdom: Animalia
- Phylum: Chordata
- Class: Mammalia
- Infraclass: Placentalia
- Order: Chiroptera
- Family: Vespertilionidae
- Genus: Lasiurus
- Species: L. semotus

Binomial name
- Lasiurus semotus (Allen, 1890)
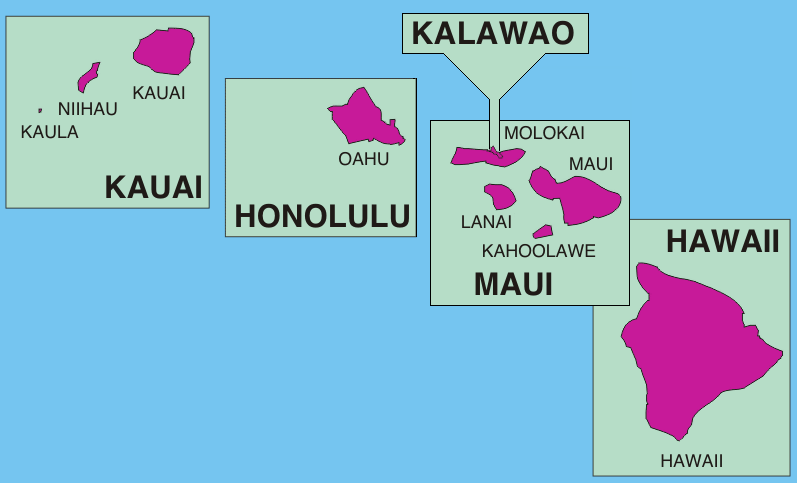
- Distributed throughout Hawaiian islands

Synonyms
- Atalapha semota Allen, 1890; Lasiurus semotus Thomas, 1902; Lasiurus (lasiurus) semotus Trouoessart, 1904; Lasiurus cinereus semotus Hall and Jones, 1961

= Hawaiian hoary bat =

Species of bat

The Hawaiian hoary bat (Lasiurus semotus), also known as ʻōpeʻapeʻa, is a species of bat endemic to the islands of Hawaiʻi. The Hawaiian hoary bat occupies the major Hawaiian islands, making it the only extant and native terrestrial mammal in the islands. Some studies report that the mainland hoary bat lives in sympatry on the Hawaiian Islands alongside the Hawaiian hoary bat, although this is disputed. The Hawaiian hoary bat was officially named the state land mammal of Hawaiʻi in 2015. It is a federally listed endangered taxon of the United States.

The Hawaiian hoary bat is listed as endangered under the Endangered Species Act. The Hawaiian hoary bat faces threats including habitat loss, collisions with man-made structures such as wind turbines and barbed wire, pesticide impacts on primary food sources, predation and competition with invasive species, roost disturbance, and tree cover reduction.

== Description ==
Hawaiian hoary bats are brown in color. They are distinguished by the silver coloration that 'frosts' the fur on their back, ears, and neck. They typically weigh between 14 and 18 g (0.49 and 0.63 ounces), and have a wingspan of about 10.5 to 13.5 inches. Females are larger than males. They are insectivorous, nocturnal, and forage using echolocation. They are a solitary subspecies and roost individually rather than in colonies. They are found throughout a range of habitats - forests, agricultural fields, and human-populated areas. Due to their solitary nature, knowledge on their ecology or life history is limited. Population sizes are unknown, which hampers recovery plans.

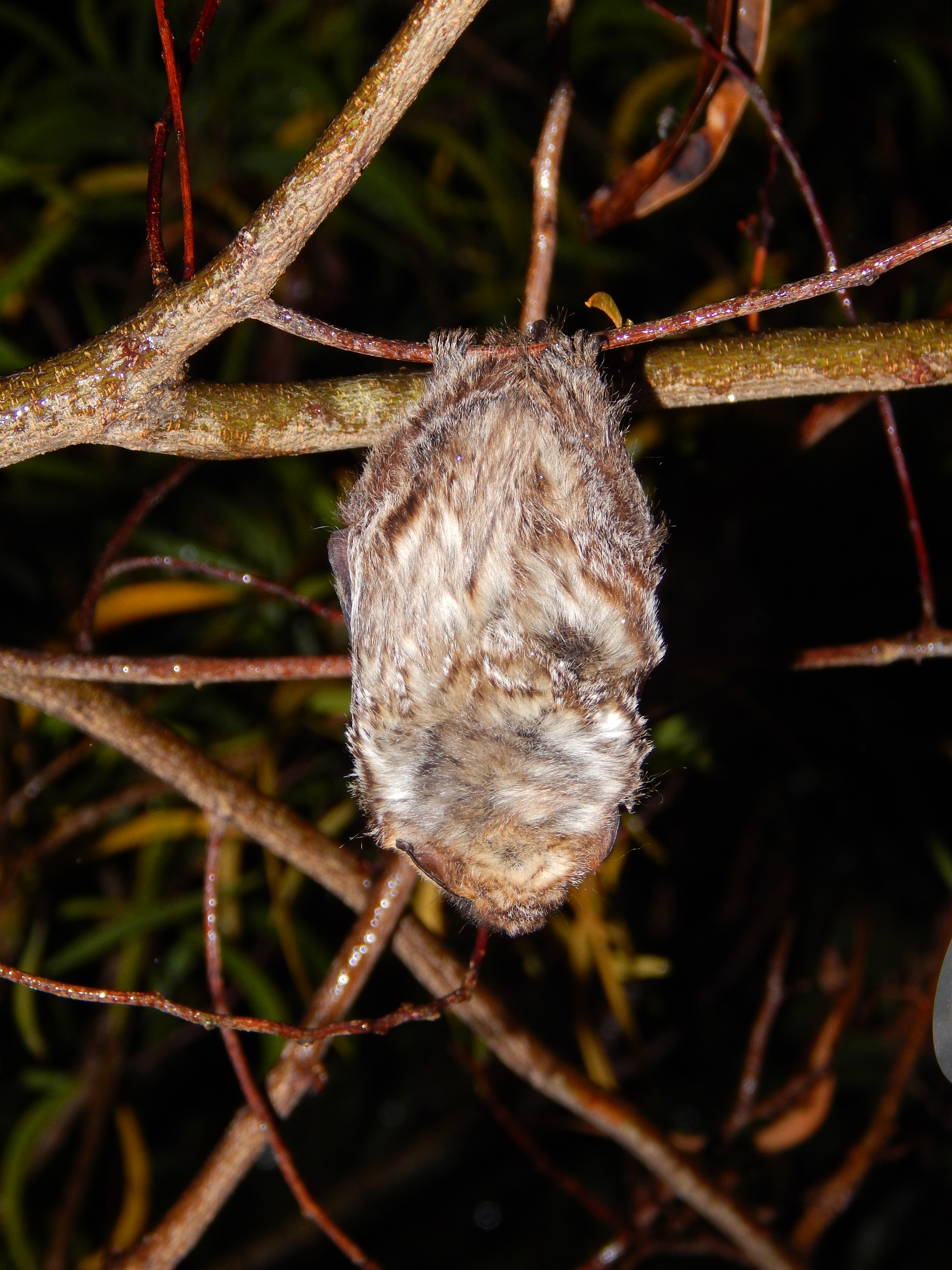
Hawaiian hoary bat with "frosty-hued fur"

The common name of the hoary bat was inspired by the hoary, or frosty, coloration of its coat. The Hawaiian hoary bat is distinguished by a silver tint along its brown back fur. More pronounced silver bands are found along the neck as the fur transitions to a yellowish brown along the face, with the ears retaining a black edging around their perimeter. On average, these bats weigh approximately 14 to 18 g (0.49 to 0.63 oz) and have a wingspan of approximately 10.5 to 13.5 in (27 to 34 cm), making them a relatively large bat species. Females are typically larger than males. The Hawaiian name, ʻōpeʻapeʻa ("half-leaf", also the shape of a traditional Hawaiian sail), refers to the outline of the bat's body, which is shaped like half a taro leaf.

== Taxonomy ==
Prior to 2015, the Hawaiian hoary bat was considered an isolated subspecies of the American hoary bat. However, a 2015 study reported significant phylogenetic divergence between dating to the mid-Pleistocene, about 1.4 million years ago, marking them a distinct species. However, the study also found evidence for two different colonizations of Hawaii by hoary bats; one during the Pleistocene by the ancestors of the Hawaiian hoary bat, along with a more recent colonization event by the mainland hoary bat, and thus posited that the islands were inhabited by both species, living in cryptic sympatry. A 2017 study affirmed these findings. However, a 2020 genetic study of a much wider sample of Hawaiian Lasiurus supported the divergence between Hawaiian and mainland hoary bats, but found no evidence that both species were sympatric on Hawaii, and attributed the previous studies' findings to incomplete lineage sorting. This would indicate that L. semotus is indeed the only bat, and overall the only native land mammal, endemic to Hawaii.

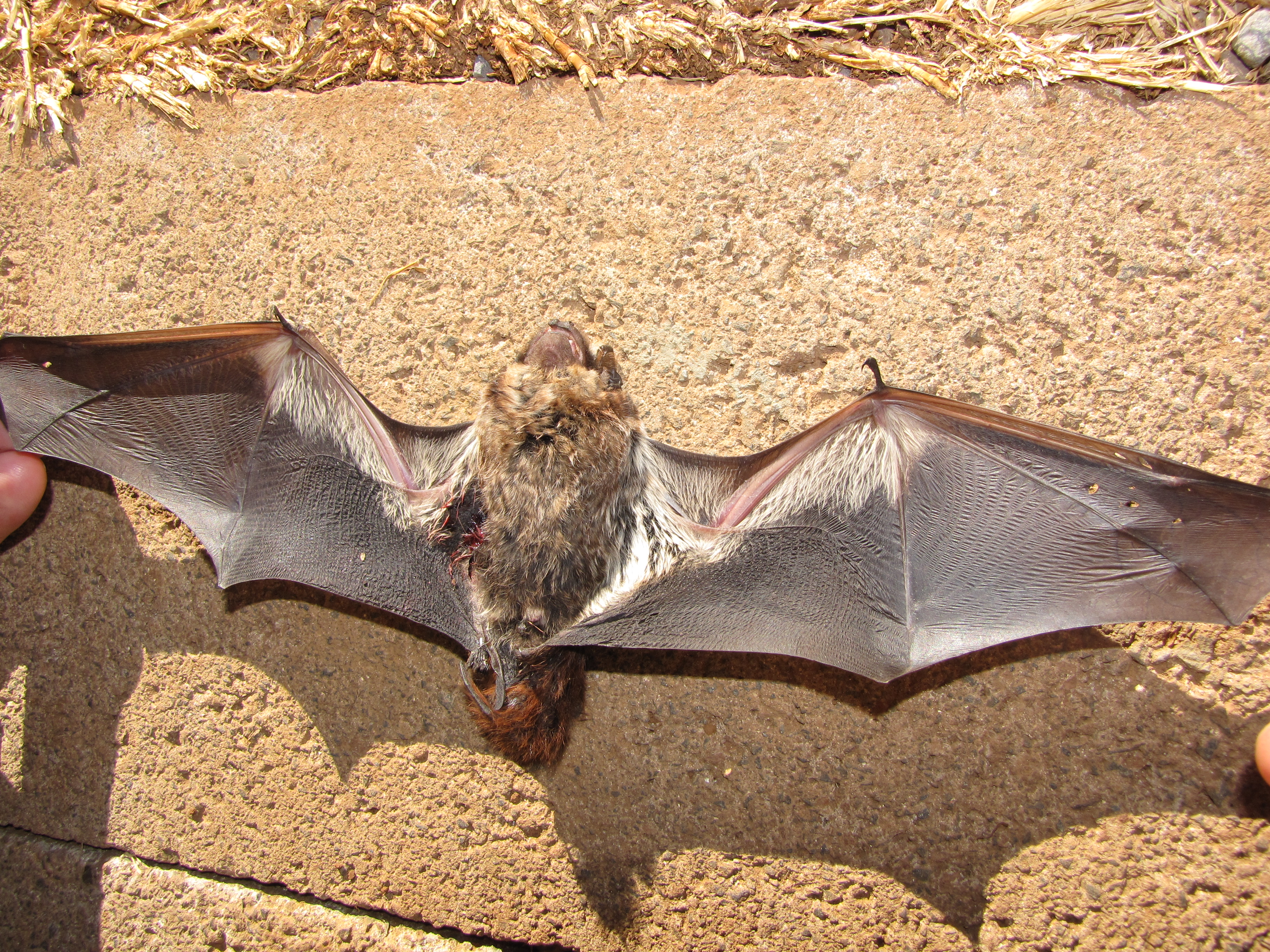
Depicts wingspan of the bat

== Ecology and behavior ==
=== Diet ===
The Hawaiian hoary bat is a generalist insectivore. A generalist is a species that preys on a wide variety of, in this case, insects. The bat's main food source consists of moths (Lepidoptera) and beetles (Coleoptera), and includes crickets, mosquitoes, termites, and many other insects. The bat's moth preference causes them to be attracted to light, which results in bats encroaching into towns. A high proportion of bats feed in pastures, where beetles are abundant due to the cattle dung. These bats prey on both native and invasive insect species. This protects crops from pest infestations.

The bat's diet fluctuates depending on its environment. The bats mainly forage for food on forest edges, in open pastures, or above the canopy. In open environments, moths form a majority of their diet. In cluttered environments, their diet is distributed across multiple insect species.

Surveys indicate that the bat is opportunistic and can forage over many habitat types, including native and non-native vegetation and the open ocean.

The Hawaiian hoary bat is a nocturnal hunter, usually hunting before sunset and returning to its nest before sunrise. Like other bats, they capture and eat their prey in flight. Bats use echolocation to spot their prey. Echolocation allows bats to catch their target in flight. The bats' flight patterns differ according to their hunting environment and their prey. In open environments (i.e. pastures or above the canopy) where larger prey is more abundant, they fly faster, sacrificing maneuverability. When hunting in closed environments (i.e. dese forests) where smaller prey is more abundant, they fly slower for more maneuverability. Foraging, bats can travel up to 12 miles in a night.

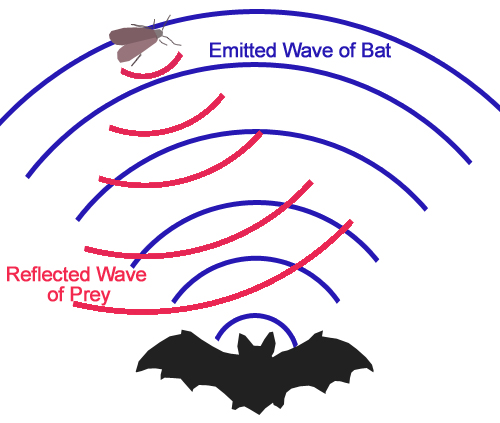
Depiction of the mechanism of echolocation in bats

Foraging is most frequent on Hawaiʻi island, with additional activity on Kauaʻi, Oʻahu, and Maui. No foraging activity is found on Molokaʻi.

=== Reproduction ===
The Hawaiian hoary bat follows a seasonal reproductive cycle. The pre-pregnancy months span November to April, after which they breed with a single mate. The bats have a new mate each season. The pregnancy period begins in May and ends in June, followed by the lactation period. Fledglings are born at the end of August and remain in the nest until they become independent at 6 to 7 weeks. Mothers usually give birth to twins. This seasonal reproductive cycle changes their habitat distribution. From pregnancy until fledgling birth, the bats remain in lowland environments. As the mating season (and winter months) approaches, bats move to highland environments. Changes in the habitat distribution are linked to the energy abundance within an environment, influenced by temperature, rainfall, and food availability. While the bats occupy all of the Hawaiian Islands, one study reported no breeding on Niʻihau and Kahoʻolawe.

The Hawaiian hoary bat roosts individually rather than in a colony. The bats remember their roosts and foraging locations and repeatedly return to them. The bats prefer to roost in forest vegetation less than 4.5 meters (15 feet) tall. These bats usually find roosting in a multitude of plants consisting of Metrosideros polymorpha (most common Hawaiian tree), coconut palms (Cocos nucifera), kukui (Aleurites moluccana), kiawe (Prosopis pallida), avocado trees (Persea americana), shower trees (Cassia javanica), pukiawe (Styphelia tameiameiae), fern clumps, Eucalyptus, and Sugi pine (Cryptomeria japonica).

=== Habitat distribution ===
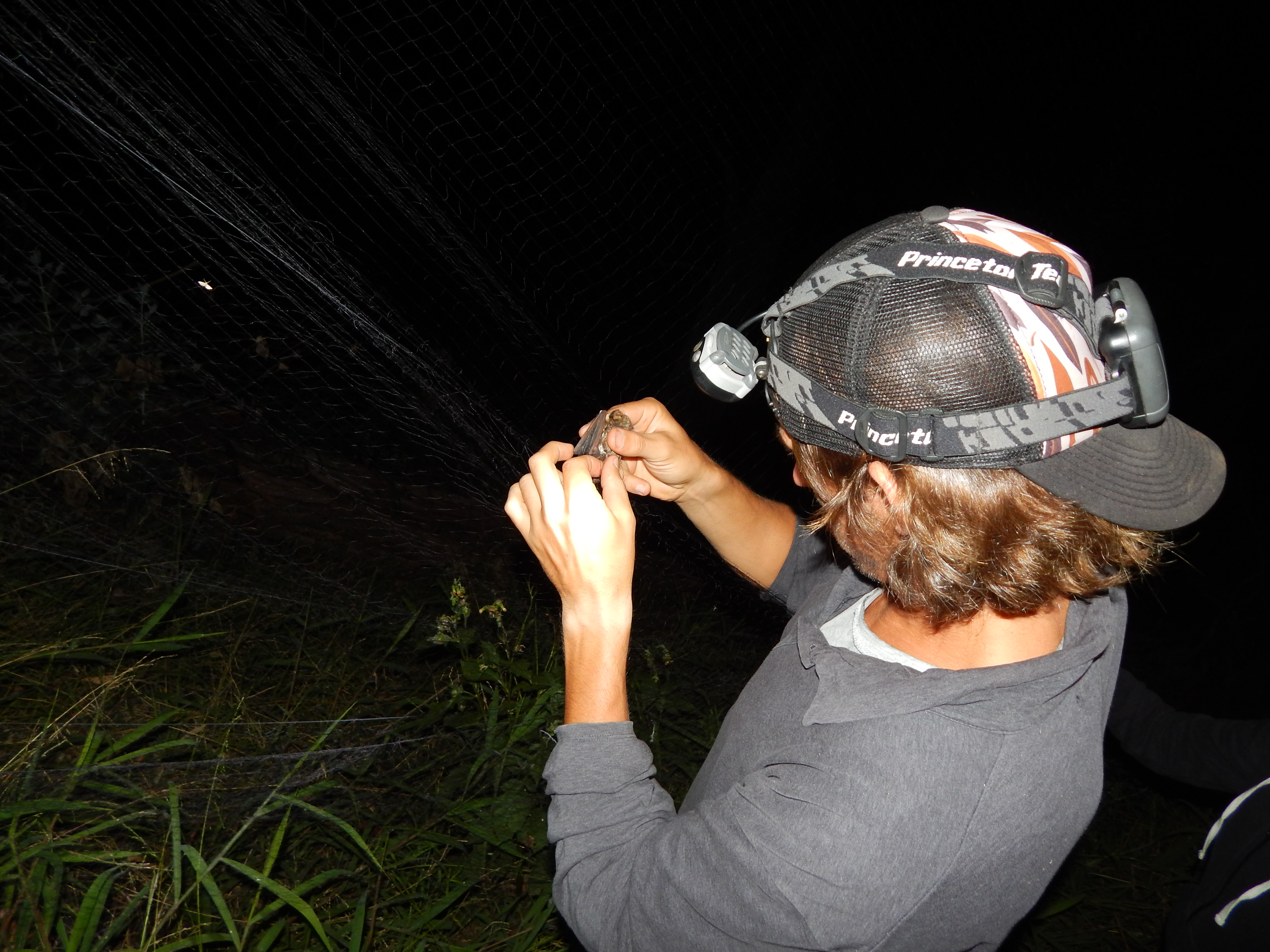
Bat netting the Hawaiian hoary bat

Their habitat distribution is observed by detecting the frequency of echolocation using acoustic detectors, as well as through bat netting and insect collection (to track foraging). The Hawaiian hoary bat occupies all the Hawaiian Islands. The habitat encompasses multiple altitudes and location types. This habitat ranges from sea level to 2,288 m (7,507 ft). The bats occupy human populated areas, forests, agricultural fields, pastures, and near mountain summits (almost 4,000 meters or 13,000 feet). During the warmer months, bats travel to lowland environments where they are more active. During the colder months, the bats travel to highland environments where they are not as active.

== Life history ==
Due to their elusive and solitary nature, little research addresses their life history. In 2005 it was estimated that population size ranged from a few hundred to a few thousand specimens, based on inadequate data. As of January 2020, population sizes and estimates were still unknown. Mating occurs from October to November. The breeding season consists of the pregnancy stage from May to June, and the lactation stage, from June to August. According to the U.S. Fish and Wildlife Service, females often bear twins, as seen in American hoary bat species. Based on one study, the average number of pups per female that survives to weaning is 1.8.

== Range ==
L.semotus occurs on all the major islands of Hawaiʻi including Kauaʻi, Oʻahu, Maui, Molokaʻi, and Hawaiʻi. Breeding populations have been reported everywere except for Niʻihau and Kahoʻolawe. The timing and origin of dispersal events have not been detailed. Fossil evidence supports the bats' early presence on the islands of Hawaiʻi, Molokaʻi, Maui, Oʻahu, and Kauaʻi.

According to the 1998 Recovery Plan, the populations were thought to be largest on the islands of Kauaiʻi and Hawaiʻi.

== Conservation ==
Lasiurus cinereus (with subspecies L. semotus) is classified as Least Concern by the IUCN. Within the US, the Hawaiian hoary bat was first listed as endangered under the Endangered Species Act (ESA) on October 13, 1970. The exact number of Hawaiian hoary bats was unknown, and the addition of the species to the list may have been precautionary.

The FWS issued a recovery plan for the bat in 1998, with the goal of moving the bat from endangered to threatened status, and eventually to de-list it. Threats to the subspecies include deforestation and habitat loss, as well as pesticide use.

Recovery criteria of the 1998 plan include:

- determination of actual population status and habitat requirements
- populations on Hawaii, Kauai, and Maui are stable or increasing for at least 5 years.

In 2009, a 5-year-review was initiated for 103 species in Hawaii, including the Hawaiian hoary bat. In 2011, a summary and evaluation of the 5-year review determined that, due to lack of data on population size and trends, the species could not be either down-listed nor delisted.

=== Threats ===
The primary threats to their population are anthropogenic. Factors such as predation and competition may affect the species but have not been studied.

The largest contributor to bat mortality is collisions with man-made objects such as barbed wire fences, communication towers, and wind turbines. Barb wire fences are the leading cause of mortality. Two hypotheses attempt to explain bats' attraction to wind turbines: turbines may look like trees; turbine blades may resemble the flight pattern of another bat.

Bats require treetops for roosting making habitat loss a threat. Clearing trees for development leaves bats unable to find places to reproduce.

Insects account for a large part of their diet. Increased use of pesticides decreases the insect populations that are a major part of the bats' food supply. Citric acid used on invasive Eleutherodactylus frog species was reported to be unlikely to have a negative effect on the bats. Beyond this, the use of pesticides is not well understood.

Recordings from 1978 indicate that the bats may have been present on Kahoʻolawe.

=== Conservation ===
The largest contributor to the endangered listing is a lack of information. Specifically, its range and population are not well known.

A useful method of population estimating is monitoring echolocation calls. Because this is the only known bat in Hawaii, any bat echolocation signals come from this subspecies. This monitoring method does not interfere with the animal.

Acoustic monitoring is used for tracking and defining the species' range. This type of information has been used in various research projects. For example, a study was commissioned by Auwahi Wind Energy for their permit. Gathering information contributes to either down-listing the species or to further efforts to conserve it.

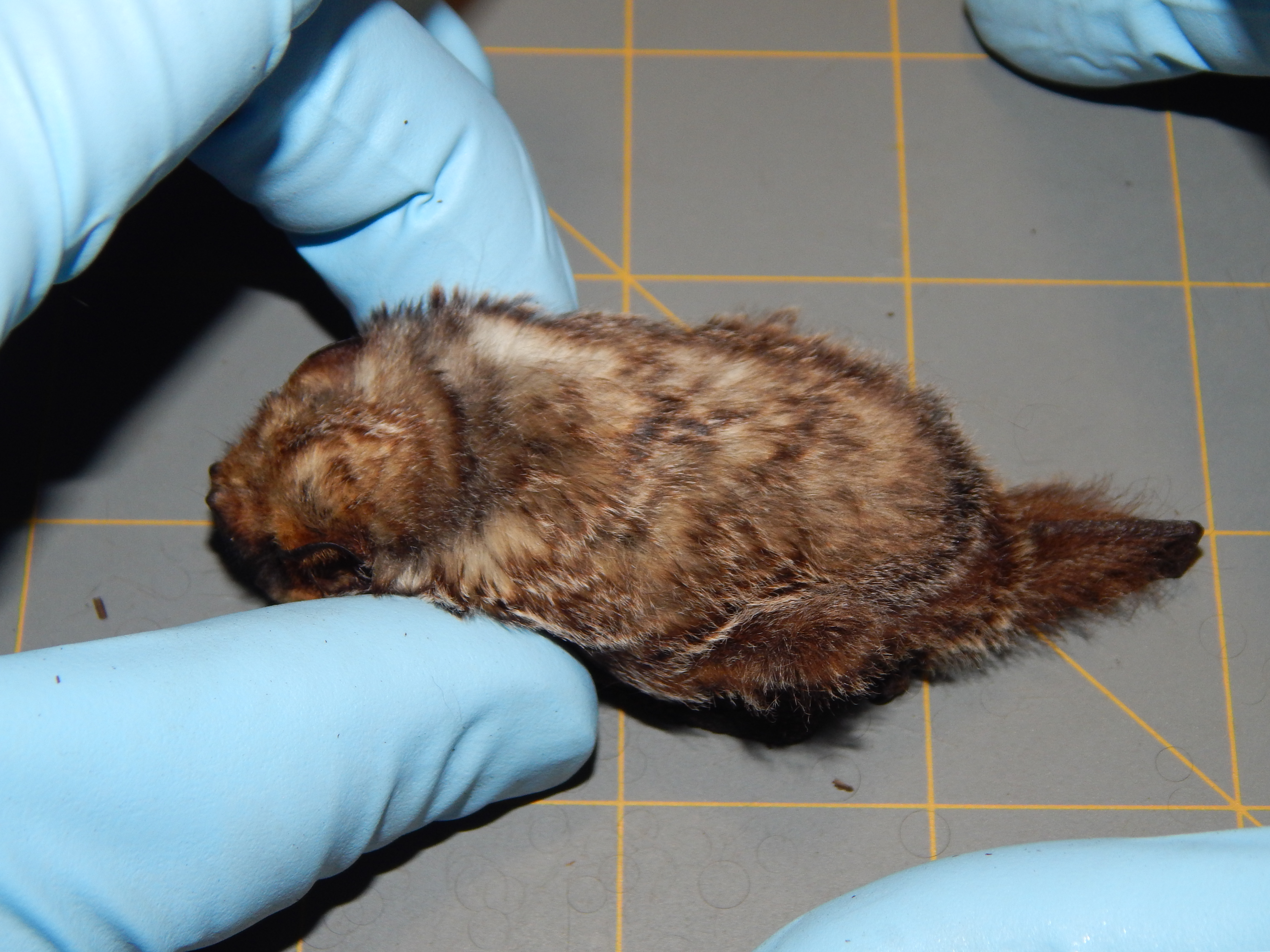
Scientist monitoring a Hawaiian hoary bat

In January 2020, the Hawaiian hoary bat Guidance for Renewable Wind Energy Proponents was updated. It provides a framework for the development of Habitat Conservation Plans (HCPs). Requirements for approval include minimizing bat death, determining impacts, providing benefits to the species, and avoiding other specified impacts. It also states that the mitigation framework should be repeatedly updated. This should happen, at last every five years. It also outlines recommendations in the following areas:

- Habitat restoration
- Land acquisition
- Research as mitigation
- In-lieu fee approaches
