= Energy in Hawaii =

Overview of energy resources in Hawaii, US

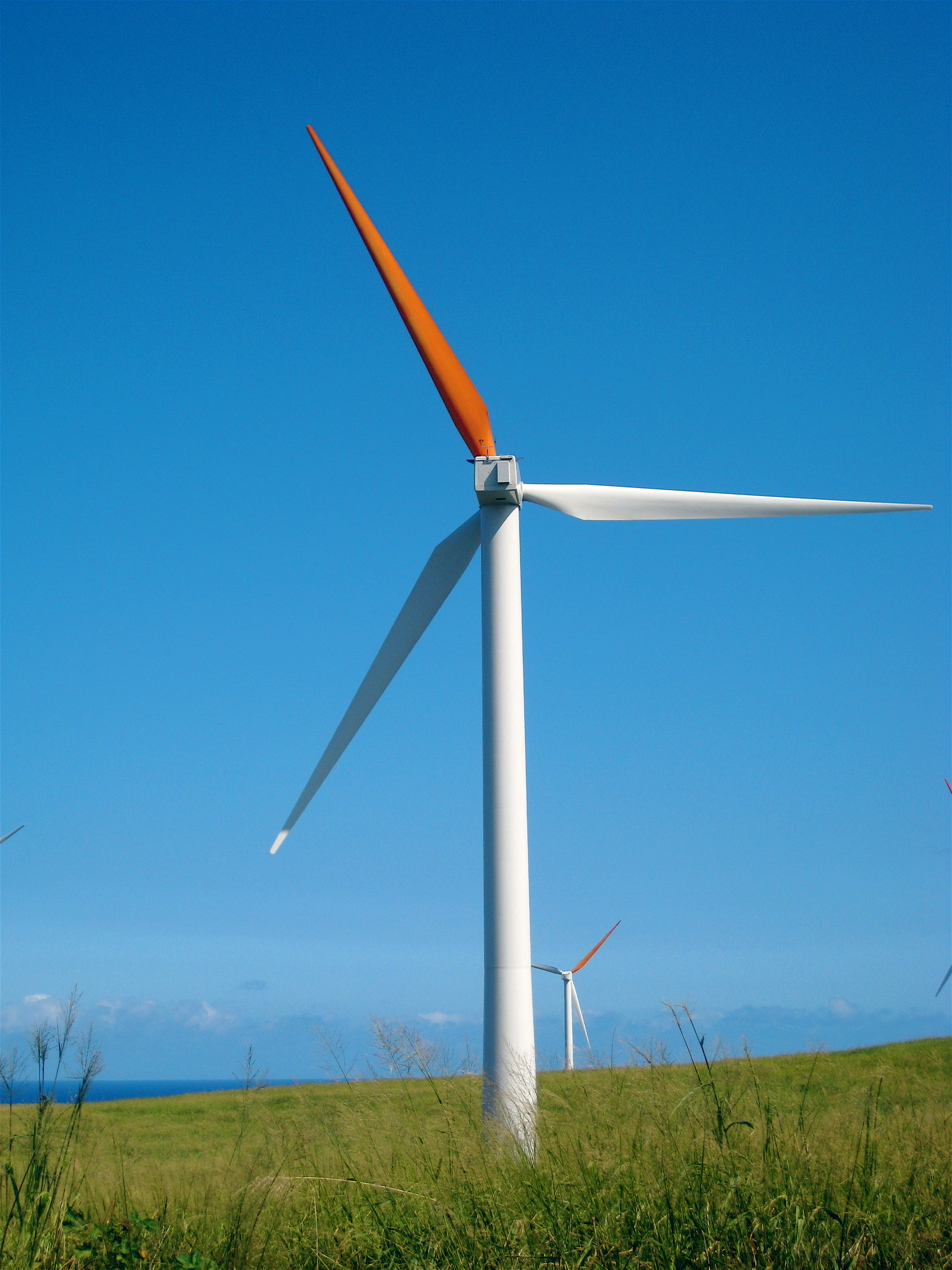
Hawi wind farm near Hāwī, Hawai'i, the Big Island. The wind farm has 16 Vestas V47-660 kW wind turbines for a total nameplate capacity of 10.56 MW.

Energy in the U.S. state of Hawaii is produced from a mixture of fossil fuel and renewable resources. Producing energy is complicated by the state's isolated location and lack of fossil fuel resources. The state relies heavily on imports of petroleum; Hawaii has the highest share of petroleum use in the United States, with 67% of electricity generation in the state coming from petroleum in 2023, compared to less than 1% nationally.

As of 2021 renewable energy made up 34.5% on Oahu, Maui and the island of Hawaii.

As of September 2024, the average cost of electricity in Hawaii was $0.41 per kilowatt-hour second only to California's average rate of $0.45 per kilowatt-hour.

== Legislation ==
HB 3179 made it easier for biofuel producers to lease state lands. SB 3190 and HB 2168 authorized special purpose revenue bonds to help finance a solar energy facility on Oahu and hydrogen generation and conversion facilities at the Natural Energy Laboratory of Hawaii Authority, located on Hawaii island.

In 2010 SB 644 mandated solar water heaters for new construction, with some exceptions. The bill eliminated solar thermal energy tax credits for homes.

SB 988 allowed the Hawaii Public Utility Commission to establish a rebate for photovoltaic systems, and HB 2550 encouraged net metering for residential and small commercial customers.

In 2008 HB 2863 provided streamlined permitting for new renewable energy facilities of at least 200 megawatts capacity. HB 2505 created a full-time renewable energy facilitator to help the state expedite permits. HB 2261 provided loans of up to $1.5 million and up to 85% of the cost of renewable energy projects at farms and aquaculture facilities.

HRS 235 established an income tax credit for photovoltaic systems of the lesser of 35% of the cost or $5,000.

On January 28, 2008, the State of Hawaii and the US Department of Energy announced the Hawaii Clean Energy Initiative, which established the commitment for renewable resources to supply 70 percent of Hawaii's energy needs by 2030.

The Initiative intended to work with public and private partners on renewable energy projects including: designing cost-effective approaches for 100 percent use of renewable energy on smaller islands, improve grid stability while incorporating variable generating sources and expanding Hawaii's capability to use locally grown crops for producing fuel and electricity.

Partners include United States Department of Energy - EERE, the state of Hawaii, Hawaiian Electric Company, Phoenix Motorcars.

== Sources ==
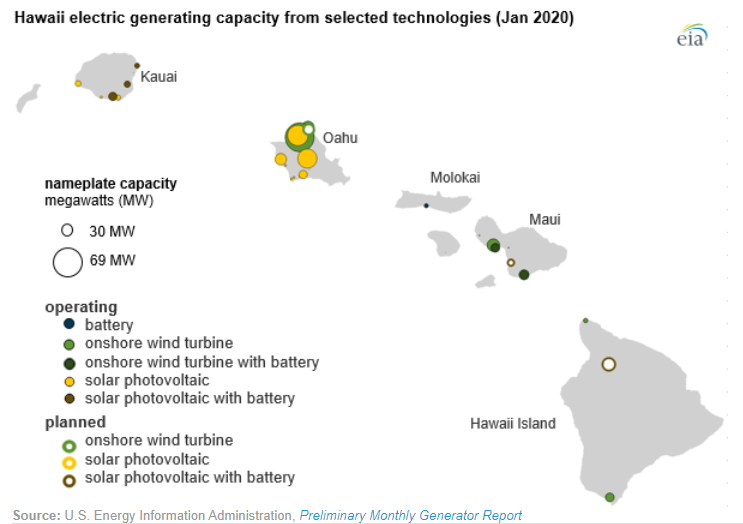
Wind and solar capacity for current and planned projects in Hawaii as of January 2020

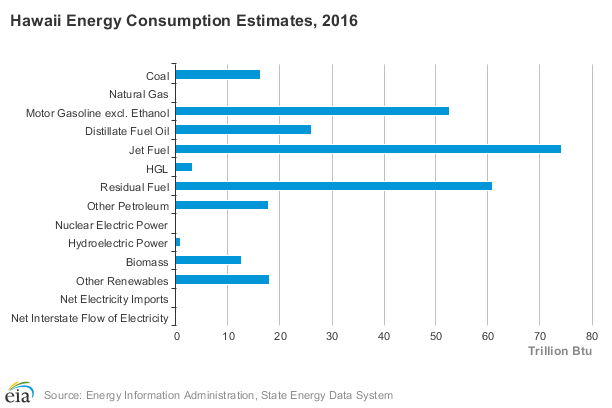

Hawaii's energy consumption is dominated by oil, which in 2016 provided 83% (down from 85.0% in 2008 and 99.7% in 1960). Other sources in 2016 included coal (5.6%) and renewable energy (11.2%). In 2017, sources of renewable power were:

2017 Renewable power
Distributed PV	33.50%
Utility-scale PV	4.90%
Wind	26.60%
Hydro	3.60%
Geothermal	10.50%
Biofuels	1.60%
Biomass	19.20%

== Electricity ==
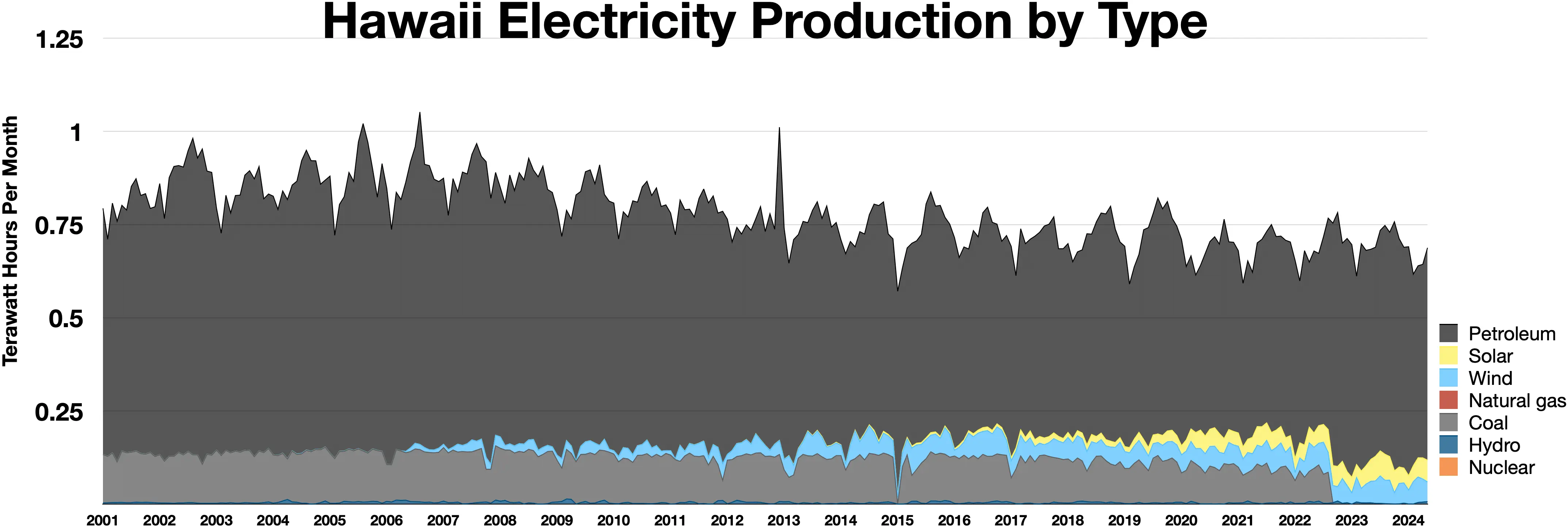
Hawaii electricity production by type

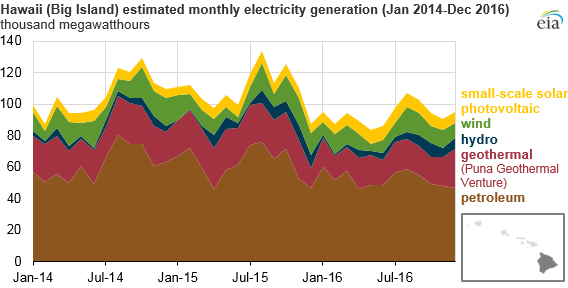
Sources of electricity on the Big Island 2014–2016

Ninety-nine percent of the population in Hawaii (outside of Kauai) is supplied by Hawaiian Electric Industries (HECO). Kauai is supplied by consumer-owned Kauai Island Utility Cooperative. As of 2018, the total dispatchable capacity was 1,727 MW, and the intermittent generation capacity was 588 MW. Each island generates its own power, unconnected to other islands. The islands have several grid batteries.

=== Oil ===
Oil is the largest electricity source. As of 2022 it produced over half of the total.

=== Solar ===
Solar power in Hawaii grew quickly, putting household energy generation below the cost of purchased electricity. In 2017, solar power produced 38.4% of the state's renewable electricity.

As of March 2020, 916 MW of solar generating capacity was installed in HECO areas.

=== Wind power ===
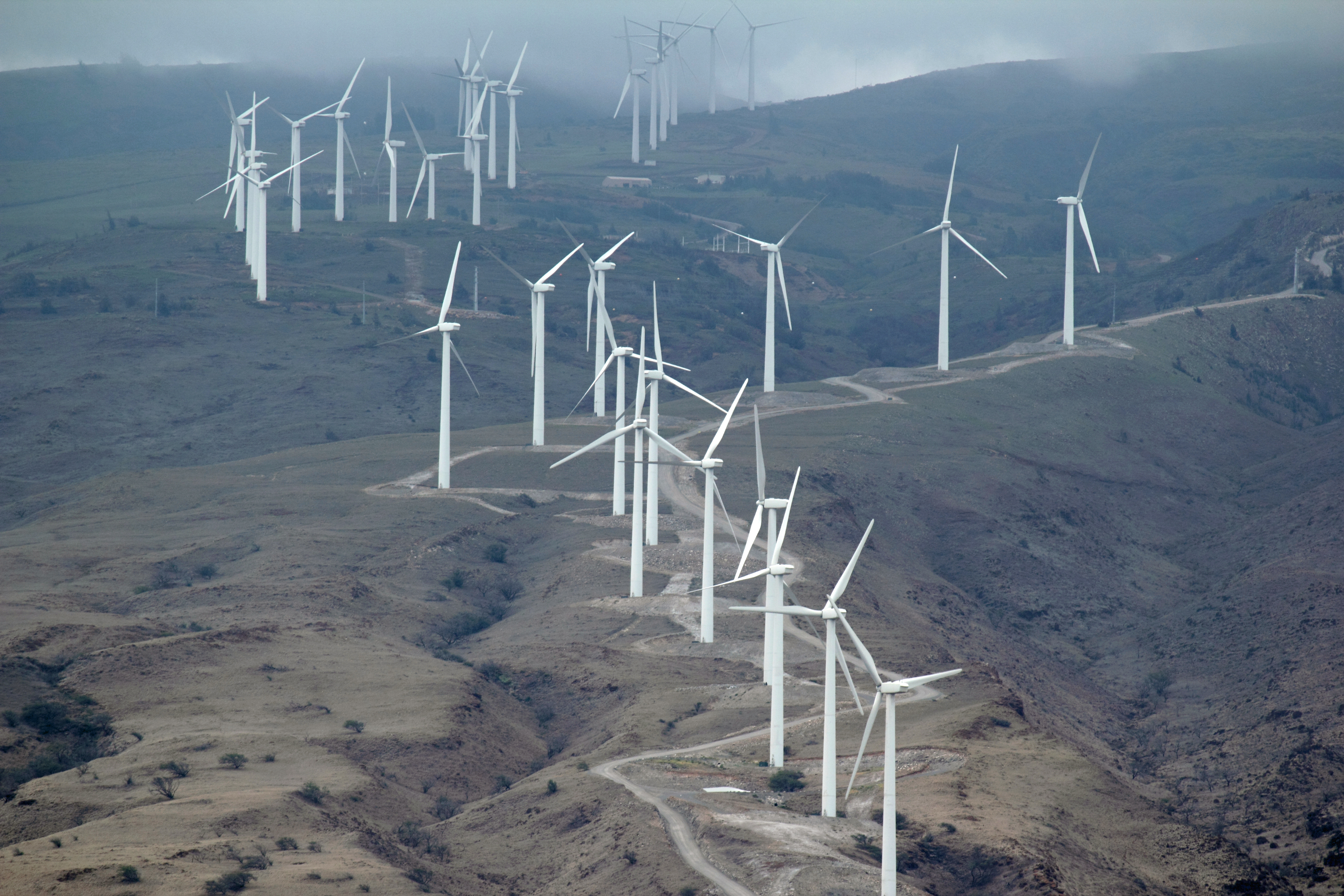
Kaheawa Wind Power

In 2022 Hawaii wind farms produced 626 GWh or 19.1% of the state's renewable electricity. Hawaii began research into wind power in the mid-1980s with a 340 kW turbine on Maui, the 2.3 MW Lalamilo Wells wind farm on Hawaii Island and the 9 MW Kamaoa wind farm on Hawaii Island. The MOD-5B, a 3.2 MW wind turbine, on Oahu was the largest in the world in 1987. These early examples were all out of service by 2010.

=== Biomass ===
Hawaii has several biomass electric plants including the 10 MW Honolulu International Airport Emergency Power Facility, the 6.7 MW Green Energy Agricultural Biomass-to-Energy Facility on Kauai, and the 6.6 MW waste-to-energy Honua Power Project on Hawaii Island. The 21.5 MW Hu Honua plant remains in litigation and is not online. Wärtsilä sold a plant to Hawaii Electric to be installed at Schofield Barracks Army Base on Oahu in 2017. The plant can run on solid or gas fuels including biomass.

Pacific Biodiesel operates a biodiesel production facility on Hawaii Island. It provides fuel to Hawaiian Electric Industries, the City and County of Honolulu and marine company Extended Horizons.

=== Coal ===
Between 1992 and 2022, a single plant operated in the state, AES Hawaii Power Plant, which generated 180 MWe. The plant closed in September 2022, accompanied by a 7% increase in electricity rates. Hawaii has banned new coal plants.

=== Geothermal ===
The 38 MW Puna Geothermal Venture was constructed on Hawaii island between 1989 and 1993. It operated until May 2018 when it was shut down due to the 2018 lower Puna eruption, and resumed production at 25 MW in November 2020.

=== Wave power ===
The U.S. Navy and the University of Hawaii operate a Wave Energy Test Site in Kaneohe Bay.

== Natural Energy Laboratory of Hawaii Authority ==
The Natural Energy Laboratory of Hawaii Authority is a test site for experimental renewable energy. It was originally built to test Ocean thermal energy conversion (OTEC), and later evolved into a commercial (but requiring state subsidies and county agricultural rate potable water) industrial park, including desalinating drinking water for export, aquaculture, biofuel from algae, solar thermal energy, concentrating solar and wind power.

== Solar hot water ==
Hawaii requires solar water heaters for new homes, except for those in areas with poor solar energy resources, homes using other renewable energy sources, and homes employing on-demand gas-fired water heaters. It offers a rebate of the lesser of 35% of the cost of photovoltaics or $5,000.

== Algae fuel ==
Cellana produces oil from algae at a 2.5 hectares (6.2 acres) research site at Kailua-Kona on Hawaii island. Cellana (previously HR BioPetroleum) worked with Royal Dutch Shell on a pilot facility to grow algae on land leased from the Natural Energy Laboratory of Hawaii Authority, on the island's west shore.

== See also ==
- Energy in the United States
