= Darren Kimura =

American businessman (born 1974)

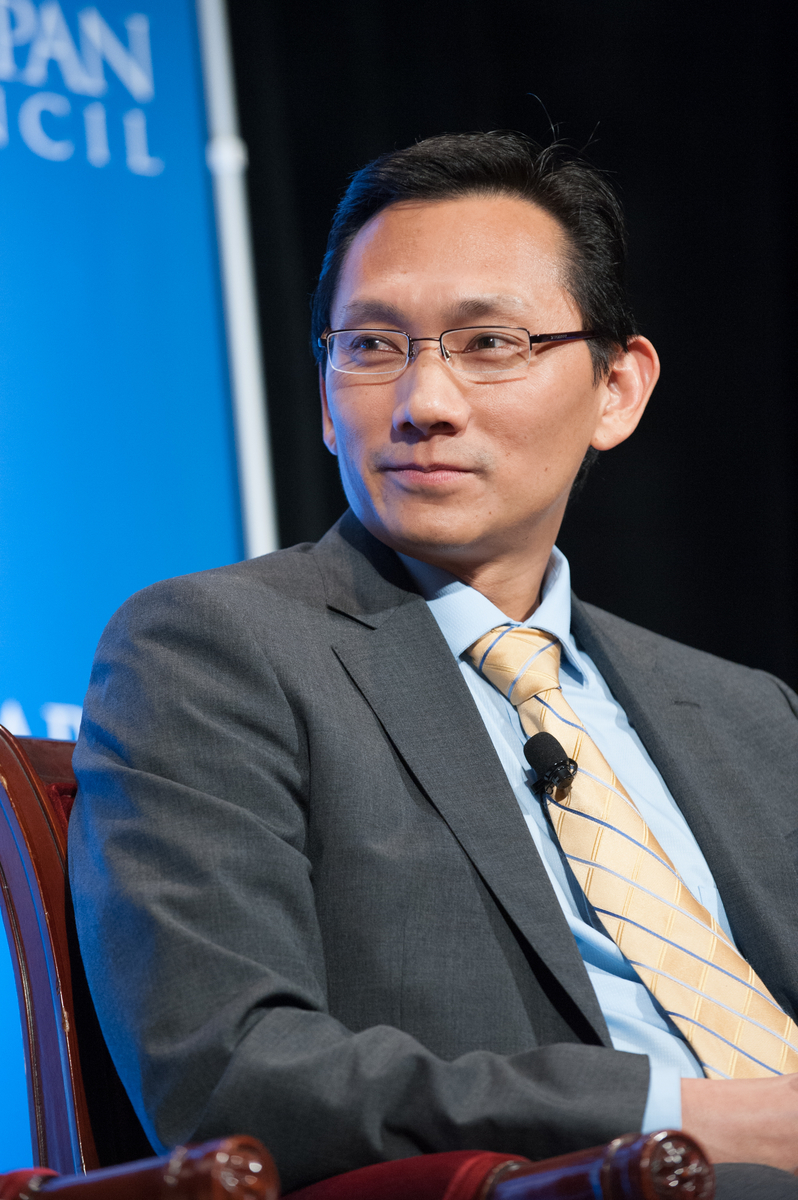
- Kimura in 2013
- Born: September 10, 1974 (age 52); Hilo, Hawaii
- Occupations: Entrepreneur, Investor, Inventor
- Known for: Inventor of MicroCSP
- Title: Managing Partner of Enerdigm Ventures, Chief Executive Officer AI Squared
- Website: twitter.com/darrentkimura/ www.darrentkimura.com

Darren T. Kimura (born September 10, 1974, Hilo, Hawaii) is an American businessman, inventor, and investor. He is best known as the inventor of micro concentrated solar power (CSP) technology known as MicroCSP.

== Life ==
Kimura was born to Japanese American parents in Hilo, Hawaii and graduated from Waiakea High School. He achieved the rank of Eagle Scout as a member in the Boy Scouts of America. He studied Computer Science and Business Management at the University of Hawaiʻi at Mānoa. He later attended Portland State University, studying Electrical Engineering and Stanford University studying Computer Science and is an Alumni from the Stanford Graduate School of Business. During the 2009 flu pandemic, Newsweek covered Darren's challenges in finding Tamiflu due to hoarding.

== Career ==
Kimura began his career as an entrepreneur bringing the sport of paintball to Hawaii while still in high school. When attending the University of Hawaii at Manoa he worked in the Information and Computer Sciences department, where he launched Nalu Communications, an internet service provider. Later, he created and expanded Energy Industries Corporation. With the support of Energy Industries he created Energy Laboratories, as an incubator for start-up companies, and Enerdigm Ventures, a venture capital firm to seed and support early to growth stage companies. MicroCSP Technology and Sopogy, Inc. began as a spin-off of at Energy Laboratories and was initially funded by Kimura and Enerdigm Ventures. Kimura and Enerdigm Ventures invested in the creation of LiveAction. Kimura and Enerdigm Ventures invested in the creation of Spin Technology a Data backup product for Google Workspace or Microsoft 365, and Kimura joined Open Source technology provider ZEDEDA as its president and Chief Operating Officer. After spending 4 years at the company and completing its Series B and $72 Million Series C, Kimura joined AI Squared as its CEO.

He also led the design and construction of the world's first MicroCSP project, called Holaniku at Keahole Point. He served as a director to the State of Hawaii Venture Capital fund. His entrepreneurial accomplishments has led him to be featured on the cover of MidWeek, on the cover of Pacific Edge, in Entrepreneur, and in the 2007 book The Greater Good: Life Lessons from Hawaii's Leaders. He was also a live guest with Al Gore on The Climate Reality Project on 24 Hours of Reality – The Dirty Weather Report. He was featured in the Hawaiian Electric Company's clean energy promotion, which was highlighted during the APEC United States 2011 and is an author at Cisco blogs and MedCity News. He has been featured for his perspectives on venture capital and artificial intelligence in the Silicon Valley Bank State of Enterprise Software Report and The Wall Street Journal on topics including Immigration and AI Policy, and Newsweek on AI as used in Colleges.

In 2012, Kimura launched a campaign to change the name of the Honolulu International Airport to the Daniel K. Inouye International Airport, in honor of the late Hawaii Senator Daniel Inouye which was achieved in 2017.

=== Energy Industries Corporation ===
Kimura started Energy Conservation Hawaii in 1994, from the back of his SUV, using his surfboard as his desk. In a few years the company reached $50 million in revenues and began national expansion. Kimura changed the company name to Energy Industries Corporation to appeal to its national markets, and he remains the largest shareholder. The underlying concept for creating Energy Industries Corporation was to help make energy efficiency simple. In his work at Energy Industries Corporation, Kimura provided Energy Star consulting services in such locations as Hawaii, Palau, Guam and Saipan. In 2008, Energy Industries Corporation was featured in The Wall Street Journal article "Alternative State", about renewable energy projects created in Hawaii.

=== MicroCSP ===
The concept for MicroCSP technologies were created when Kimura attempted to install a conventional Concentrating Solar Power trough in Kona, Hawaii. Realizing that it was uneconomical and not practical to ship, install and operate such large components in remote locations like Hawaii, Kimura worked on reducing the dimensions of the solar collector which led to reconfiguring the technology and incorporating the use of state of the art materials. MicroCSP is used for community-sized power plants (1 MW to 50 MW), for industrial, agricultural and manufacturing 'process heat' applications, and when large amounts of hot water are needed, such as resort swimming pools, water parks, large laundry facilities, sterilization, distillation and other such uses. MIT also studied the use of MicroCSP technology in power generation using the Organic Rankine Cycle. Kimura trademarked the term MicroCSP and later released the term for use in the public domain to help accelerate MicroCSP adoption. His US Patent on the idea (U.S. patent 20,080,127,967) served as the basis for other MicroCSP inventions. Companies producing MicroCSP technologies include GlassPoint Solar Abengoa Solar Aora Sun2Power Chromasun SolarLite NEP Solar Novatec Solar Industrial Solar Focal Point Energy SunTrough Focused Sun Heat 2 Power and Nanogen and Tamuz Energy.

=== Sopogy ===
Solar Power Technology company or "Sopogy", was a solar thermal technology supplier, was founded in 2002 at the Honolulu, Hawaii–based clean technology incubator known as Energy Laboratories. The company began its research on concentrating solar thermal energy to produce solar steam and thermal heat for absorption chillers or industrial process heat. The company has also developed applications that incorporate its solar collectors to generate electricity and desalination. Kimura created the company name from taking sections of key words including "SO" from Solar, "PO" from "Power", and "GY" from "Energy and Technology". The company's OEM and IPP sales teams are located in Honolulu along with its research and development, and in 2006 it expanded its manufacturing, C&I, and oil and gas sales teams in its Silicon Valley facility. Sopogy has installed 200 megawatts in China, and 360 megawatts in Thailand. Kimura and Sopogy, along with First Solar, were featured in the Whole Foods Market documentary Thrive. In 2011 Sopogy was honored with the APEC Business Innovation Award, and was featured on the cover of the Los Angeles Times.

Sopogy completed a Series E preferred financing in October 2012 led by Mitsui & Co. and SunEdison, a U.S. solar company, Sempra Energy, 3M, and others. The company announced that Darren Kimura had stepped down as the chairman, chief executive officer and president in March 2013, and SunEdison installed one of its executives as president of the company. After completing a hand-over period, Darren Kimura left the company in May 2013. Sopogy was acquired by Hitachi Power Systems in 2014.

=== LiveAction ===
Enerdigm Ventures invested in the founding of LiveAction, Inc., an enterprise network management software company which was originally a government project funded in 2007 at Referentia Systems, Inc. and Kimura joined the company as chairman of the Board of Directors, Executive Chairman and later as chief executive officer. The company is best known for its NetFlow visualization capabilities and quality of service monitoring and configuration capabilities. Kimura led LiveAction to achieve a place on the Cisco Solutions Plus Program and completed LiveAction's Series A financing that included participation by Enerdigm Ventures, Sway Ventures, In-Q-Tel and Cisco Systems LiveAction expanded its capabilities in scale to achieve an industry leading 1 million flows per second Under Kimura, LiveAction launched LiveAgent to extend visibility to the network end point and LiveAction completed a $36 million Series B financing led by Insight Venture Partners, Cisco Systems and AITV in early 2016. In December 2017, Kimura led the acquisition of LivingObjects' Service Provider network monitoring platform and to the creation of the LiveSP business unit at LiveAction. In June 2018, Kimura led the acquisition of Savvius formerly known as WildPackets famous for their OmniPeek protocol analysis software. Kimura retired from LiveAction business operations in 2019. LiveAction was acquired by BlueCat Networks in 2024.

=== Spin Technology ===
In 2020, Enerdigm Ventures invested in Spin Technology, Inc., formerly known as SpinBackup a data backup product for G-Suite or Office 365 and Kimura joined the company as chairman of the board of directors and Executive Chairman. where he developed SpinOne, the company's integrated product offering also referred to as Spin.ai. The technology provides API based data protection for businesses critical SaaS cloud based data in G Suite and Office 365 environments, Application and Extension risk assessments for G-Suite and Cyber Liability Insurance . Spin.ai has a 4.9 rating out of 5 in the G Suite marketplace. In 2022, Spin Technology closes its Series A financing and Enerdigm Ventures and Kimura exited the company.

=== Zededa ===
In 2021, Kimura joined Zededa, an open-sourced, distributed, cloud-native edge computing orchestration solution as its president and Chief Operating Officer. While at Zededa, Kimura led to the acquisition of the company's $26 Million Series B and $72 Million Series C financing at a $400 Million post-money valuation. After nearly 4 years of service, Kimura announced his exit from the company in Q4 2024.

=== Margo ===
While at Zededa, Kimura served on the steering committee of Margo, a Linux Foundation initiative for interoperability at the edge of industrial automation ecosystems.

=== AI Squared ===
In 2024, Kimura was announced as the President and Chief Operating Officer of AI Squared, a New Enterprise Associates venture backed company. Kimura was promoted to Chairman and Chief Executive Officer in March 2025. A dual-use technology company, AI Squared has numerous engagements with the US Department of Defense including awards with the Naval Information Warfare Systems Command, and the Department of Defense Joint Artificial Intelligence Center (JAIC), Cooperative Development and Research Agreements (CRADA) with the National Security Agency (NSA), and the National Geospatial-Intelligence Agency (NGA), and contracts with the Johns Hopkins University Applied Physics Lab.

== Awards ==
Kimura received the 2002 SBA Young Entrepreneur of the Year award. He was honored as the 2007 Green Entrepreneur, and received the Blue Planet Foundation award in 2009. He also received the Hawaii Venture Capital Association Deal of the Year award in 2012. He was named to the 2010 Hawaii Business Magazine's "10 for Today", along with professional baseball player Shane Victorino, and founder of eBay, Pierre Omidyar, and was named to the Pacific Business News's "10 to Watch in 2013", along with video game developer and video game Tetris distributor Henk Rogers.

== Non-profit activities ==
Kimura is active in community and philanthropic activities with a strong focus on Hawaii. He serves as vice president and director at Blue Planet Foundation, and vice president and director at SEE-IT (Science Engineering Exposition of Innovative Technologies), He is also on the board of directors at PBS Hawaii, is entrepreneur in residence at Punahou School, is on the board of directors at Enterprise Honolulu, the Oahu Economic Development Board, and is on the Dean's Council of University of Hawaii at Manoa's College of Engineering. Kimura sponsors the Hawaii Island Science Fair "Kimura Award for Innovations in Clean Energy" which was awarded to Felix Peng (2016) of Waiakea High School, Ben Kubo (2017) of Parker School, Cesar Rivera (2017) of St Joseph School of Hilo. Also in 2017, Kimura expanded the Hawaii Island Science Fair award to include the "Kimura Award for Innovations in Computer Science" which was awarded to Ara Uhr of Hilo High School. Kimura also serves as an advisor to the Japan Innovation Campus based in Silicon Valley, Palo Alto CA which is sponsored by the Japanese Ministry of Economy, Trade and Industry as an initiative of the Japanese government's Five-Year Start-Up Fostering Plan

== See also ==
- List of people associated with renewable energy
- List of solar thermal power stations
- SolarPACES
- Solar thermal collector
- Intersolar
