= El Caracol, Ecatepec =

Retention basin in Ecatepec de Morelos, Mexico

Coordinates: 19.56998°N 99.001837°W

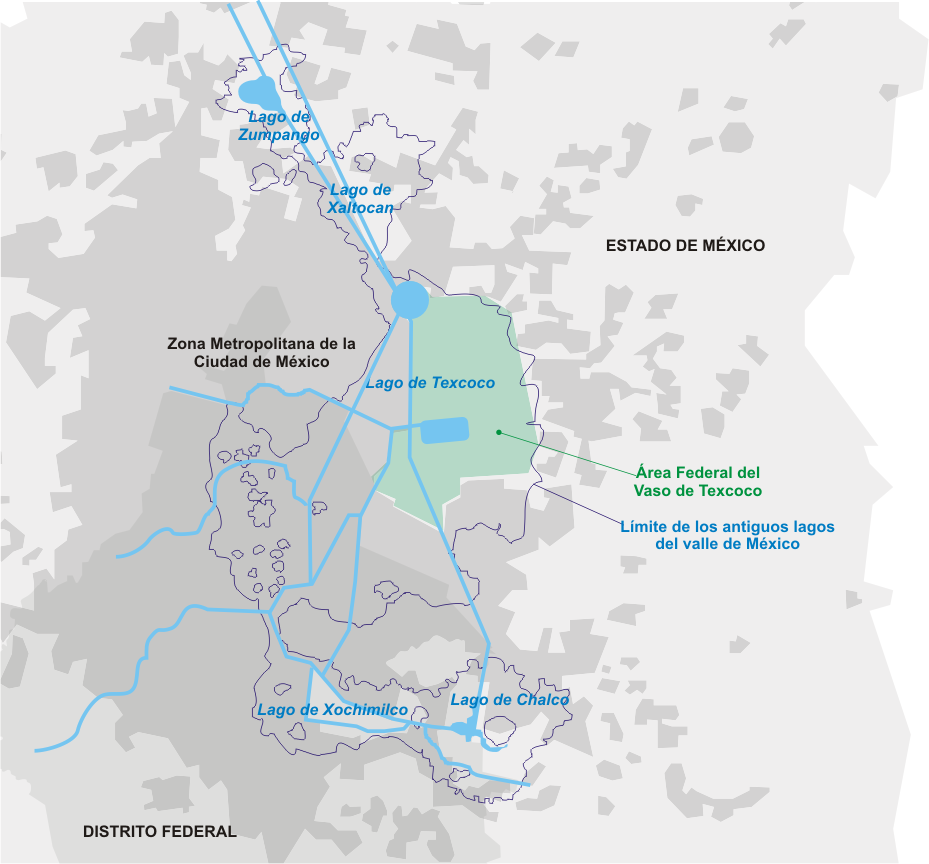
Map of the Mexico City basin. El Caracol is the clear blue circle that appears in the northern part of the current Á. F. del Vaso de Texcoco (green area).

El Caracol Solar Evaporation Pond (Spanish: Deposito de Evaporación Solar "El Caracol"), also known as El Caracol de Texcoco or "El Caracol de la Ciudad de México, is a large spiral-shaped retention basin located over the former lakebed of Lake Texcoco, northeast of Mexico City, in the municipio of Ecatepec de Morelos, Mexico.

== History ==
=== Solar evaporator ===
Built in 1944 by the SOSA Texcoco corporation, the basin is called el caracol (the snail) due to the short, spiral-shaped concrete levee that circles it. Approximately 3,200 m in diameter, the levee was part of the original plan to create a solar evaporation pond to extract sodium carbonate (soda ash) and calcium chloride (rock salt) from the mineral-rich underground waters of the former Lake Texcoco. Water from the lake entered the structure from a pumphouse situated on an island in the middle of the basin, and was channeled outwards and clockwise (with the channel increasing in width and decreasing in depth) until it became too shallow to flow further. The water would then evaporate in the opposite (counterclockwise) direction, maximizing efficiency and allowing for a predictable collection of 100 tons of salts per day. Half of the soda ash collected was to be processed into calcium hydroxide (lye) at a series of plants nearby.

Unfortunately, poor understanding of the principles of alkaline brines made the process (particularly the refining) more expensive than SOSA Texcoco expected, and the venture was not profitable. In the late 1950s, the company was absorbed into the government-administered Fomento Industrial SOMEX conglomerate, which began exploring more profitable uses for the facility.

=== Aquaculture pond ===
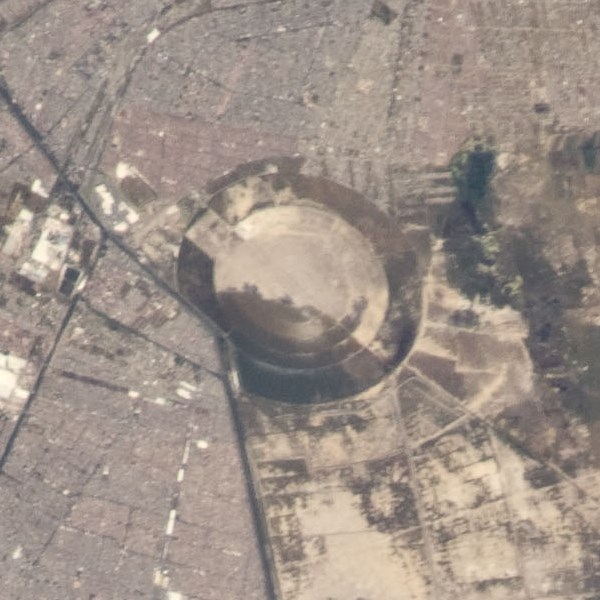
Satellite image of El Caracol in 2011

In 1967, it was discovered that the blue-green algae natural to Lake Texcoco's alkaline waters (which had previously been filtered and discarded) could instead be deliberately cultivated in the El Caracol basin, collected with screens and processed into Spirulina, a dry nutritional supplement powder, for commercial sale. Proudly branded as "Spirulina Mexicana", the idea resurrected the ancient agricultural practices of the Aztecs, who had collected and traded the edible algae from Lake Texcoco during the pre-Columbian era.

In 1973, the world's first commercial Spirulina production facility was opened at El Caracol with a production capacity of one ton per day, eventually expanding to a series of plants producing 200 tons a day. Salt production effectively ceased during the 70s and 80s, as it was considerably more profitable to keep the basin full and agitated at all times during the optimal summer growing season rather than using the summer heat to evaporate salts. The Spirulina Mexicana brand remained the world's largest through the 1980s and was one of SOSA Texcoco's most profitable assets; unfortunately, the famous snail shape and repurposed nature of the evaporation basin actually hindered efficient aquaculture operations and forced much of the harvesting work to be done by hand. The company also found itself unable to expand further within Mexico City, as the population had quadrupled in size since El Caracol was built in the 1940s and now effectively surrounded the facility. As the price for spirulina spiked, other companies—primarily Earthrise Nutritionals in California and Cyanotech in Hawaii—invested heavily in technology, abandoning the single pond aquaculture system for the (still used) system of individual symmetrical ponds, serviced entirely by automatic equipment and optimized to produce upwards of 350–400 tons a day with far lower labor costs than the Mexicans could match. Spirulina Mexicana, unable to compete, rapidly lost its initial market share, eventually becoming just as unprofitable as the salt operations had been.

=== Insolvency ===
Serious labor troubles also beset the organization during the tumultuous political events of the late 1980s in Mexico, culminating in a series of strikes and the bankruptcy of SOSA Texcoco in December 1986. The company and facilities were sold at a bargain rate to a collective of investors called Sociedad Anónima de Capital Variable in 1991, who stated their intent to try and make the facility profitable again. However, the primary issue remained that El Caracol was never successfully automated and relied almost entirely on manual labor to harvest either salt or algae; the company's primary efforts were thus to renegotiate the unsustainably generous collective bargaining contracts for manual laborers (exclusively reserved for Institutional Revolutionary Party members in good standing) that were mandated upon SOSA Texcoco by the Madrid administration during the last years of the PRI's 70-year monopoly on Mexican politics as a one-party state ("la dictadura perfecta"). After the Mexican Supreme Court (which was still entirely composed of PRI loyalists) ruled in 1991 that the old contracts must be honored if any profit-seeking business was to resume operations on the site, the new company promptly admitted defeat and folded. Now basically prohibited by law from generating a profit on the site, the government liquidated the original deed, voided the worker contracts and seized the inactive facility as a public asset.

== Water treatment ==
The basin is currently owned by the Mexican government and in use as a reservoir for industrial facilities within Mexico City, particularly during the dry season when the city often suffers acutely from a lack of water. It is filled from a junction with the Canal de Sal that runs along the south edge of the facility and connects it to the rest of the Mexico City drainage basin.

In 2011, CONAGUA, Mexico's National Water Commission, approved a 764 million peso (€47 million) proposal by Spanish utilities group Acciona to convert El Caracol into a massive wastewater treatment plant. The planned facility would be capable of treating 2,000 liters per second of black water from the overloaded Mexico City sewer system, discharging it as grey water to be used as agricultural irrigation in Atenco and Texcoco, thus potentially saving the city nearly 350 million gallons of drinking water a day. The facility, which began operating in 2013, pumps its second-stage treated water to another facility in Atotonilco for further treatment.

== See also ==
- Lago de Texcoco
