= Solar power in Hawaii =

Overview of solar power in the U.S. state of Hawaii

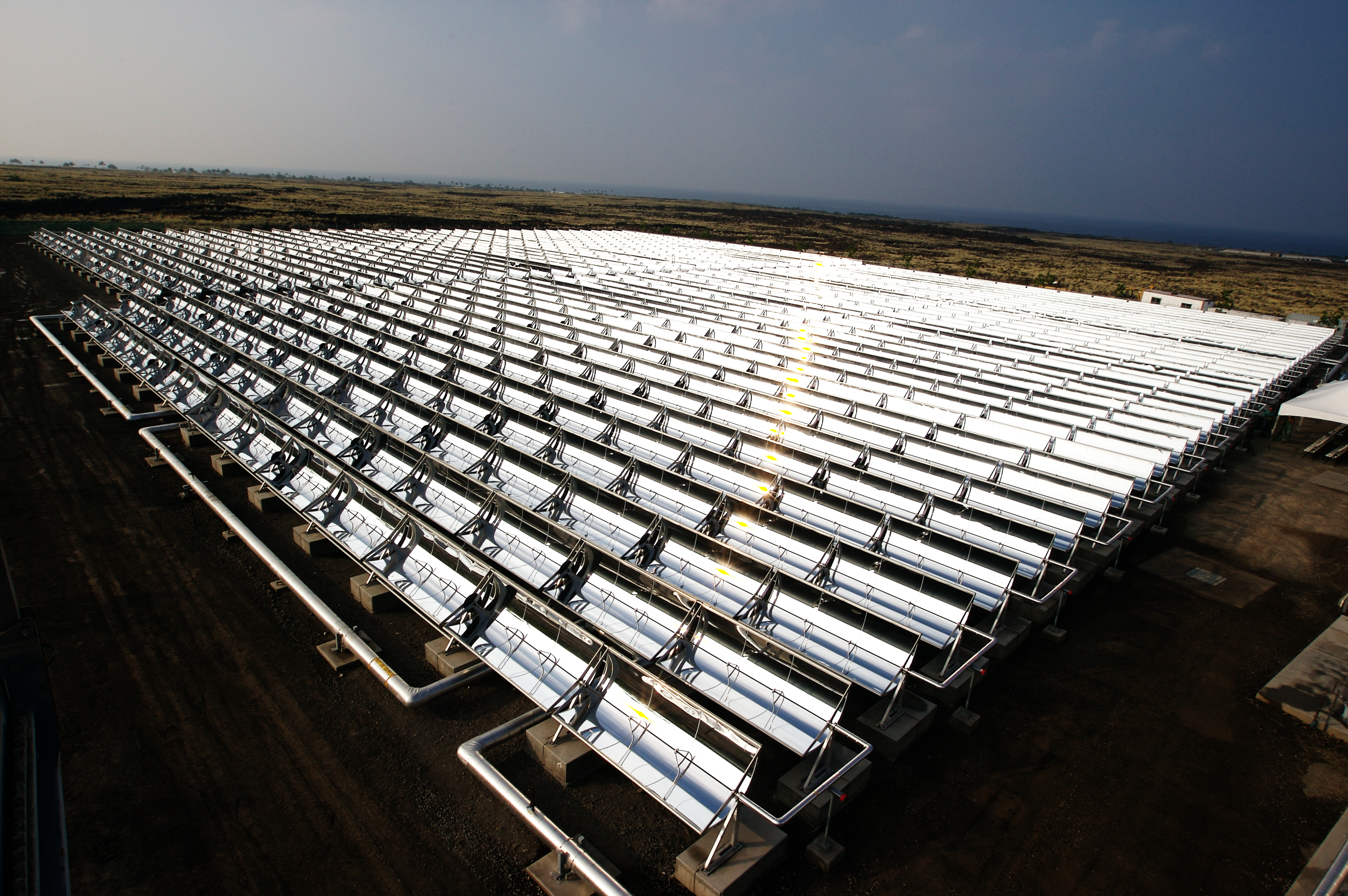
MicroCSP collectors on the Big Island of Hawaii

The energy sector in Hawaii has rapidly adopted solar power due to the high costs of electricity, and good solar resources, and has one of the highest per capita rates of solar power in the United States. Hawaii's imported energy costs, mostly for imported petroleum and coal, are three to four times higher than the mainland, so Hawaii has motivation to become one of the highest users of solar energy. Hawaii was the first state in the United States to reach grid parity for photovoltaics. Its tropical location provides abundant ambient energy.

Much of Hawaii's solar capacity is distributed solar panels on individual homes and businesses. Hawaii's grid has had to deal with this unique situation by developing new technology for balancing the energy flows in areas with large amounts of solar power. In 2023, distributed solar produced 1,408 GWh while utility-scale solar produced 643 GWh. Hawaii had 1,808 MW of installed solar capacity in 2023. The largest utility-scale solar farm in Hawaii is the 60 MW Kuihelani Solar on Maui, which opened in 2024, and includes 240 MWhr of battery storage As of 2024, solar power produced 19.5% of Hawaii's electricity.

== Currently operating (Note: As of December 31, 2025) ==
Solar Facilities in Hawaii
#	Plant Name	Utility Name	County	Capacity (MW)	Operating Year
1	AES Kekaha Solar, LLC Hybrid	AES Distributed Energy	Kauai	14.0	2019
2	AES Lawai Solar Hybrid	AES Distributed Energy	Kauai	20.0	2018
3	AES Maui Kuihelani Solar Hybrid	AES Distributed Energy	Maui	60.0	2024
4	AES Waikoloa Solar Hybrid	AES Distributed Energy	Hawaii	30.0	2023
5	AES West Oahu Solar Hybrid	AES Distributed Energy	Honolulu	12.5	2024
6	Aloha Solar Energy Fund 1 PK1	Altus Power America Management, LLC	Honolulu	5.0	2017
7	BRE - Ritz Carlton Kapalua	Onyx Asset Services Group	Maui	1.5	2025
8	BYU - Hawaii	SkyHigh 2 Solar	Honolulu	3.1	2021
9	EE Waianae Solar Project	EE Waianae Solar Project LLC	Honolulu	28.3	2017
10	H Power	Covanta Honolulu Resource Recovery	Honolulu	2.9	2020
11	Hale Kuawehi Solar Hybrid	Hale Kuawehi Solar LLC	Hawaii	44.0	2025
12	Ho'Ohana Solar 1	Ho'Ohana Solar 1 LLC	Honolulu	65.3	2025
13	KIUC Kapaia PV and BA Storage Project Hy	Tesla Inc.	Kauai	15.0	2017
14	KRS I Anahola Solar Hybrid	Kauai Island Utility Cooperative	Kauai	12.0	2015
15	KRS II Koloa Solar	Kauai Island Utility Cooperative	Kauai	12.0	2014
16	Kalaeloa Renewable Energy Park	ENI New Energy US Inc	Honolulu	5.0	2014
17	Kalaeloa Solar Two	Altus Power America Management, LLC	Honolulu	5.0	2012
18	Kapaa Photovoltaic Project	Kapaa Solar LLC	Kauai	1.0	2010
19	Kapolei Solar Energy Park	Altus Power America Management, LLC	Honolulu	1.0	2012
20	Kawailoa Solar	Kawailoa Solar, LLC	Honolulu	49.0	2019
21	Kihei Solar Farm	South Maui Renewable Resources LLC	Maui	2.9	2018
22	Ku'ia Solar	Ku'ia Solar LLC	Maui	2.9	2018
23	Lanai Solar-Electric Plant	Lanai Sustainability Research LLC	Maui	1.2	2008
24	Lanikuhana Solar LLC	Lanikuhana Solar LLC	Honolulu	14.7	2019
25	Mauka FIT One	Valta Energy	Honolulu	3.5	2020
26	Mauna Loa Macadamia Nut	Macadamia Nut Road Solar Project 2019	Hawaii	0.8	2021
27	Mililani South Solar Farm	Mililani I Solar LLC	Honolulu	39.0	2022
28	Pearl City Peninsula Solar Park	Altus Power America Management, LLC	Honolulu	1.0	2012
29	Port Allen Solar	Ka Ie Ie Waho Company, LLC	Kauai	6.0	2012
30	Waiawa Solar Power Hybrid	Waiawa Solar Power LLC	Honolulu	36.0	2023
31	Waihonu North Solar	ERCAM LLC	Honolulu	5.0	2016
32	Waihonu South Solar	ERCAM LLC	Honolulu	1.5	2016
33	Waipio Peninsula	Pacific Energy Solutions, LLC	Honolulu	11.0	2015
34	Waipio Solar	Waipio PV, LLC	Honolulu	45.9	2019
35	West Loch Solar One	Hawaiian Electric Co Inc	Honolulu	20.0	2019

== History ==
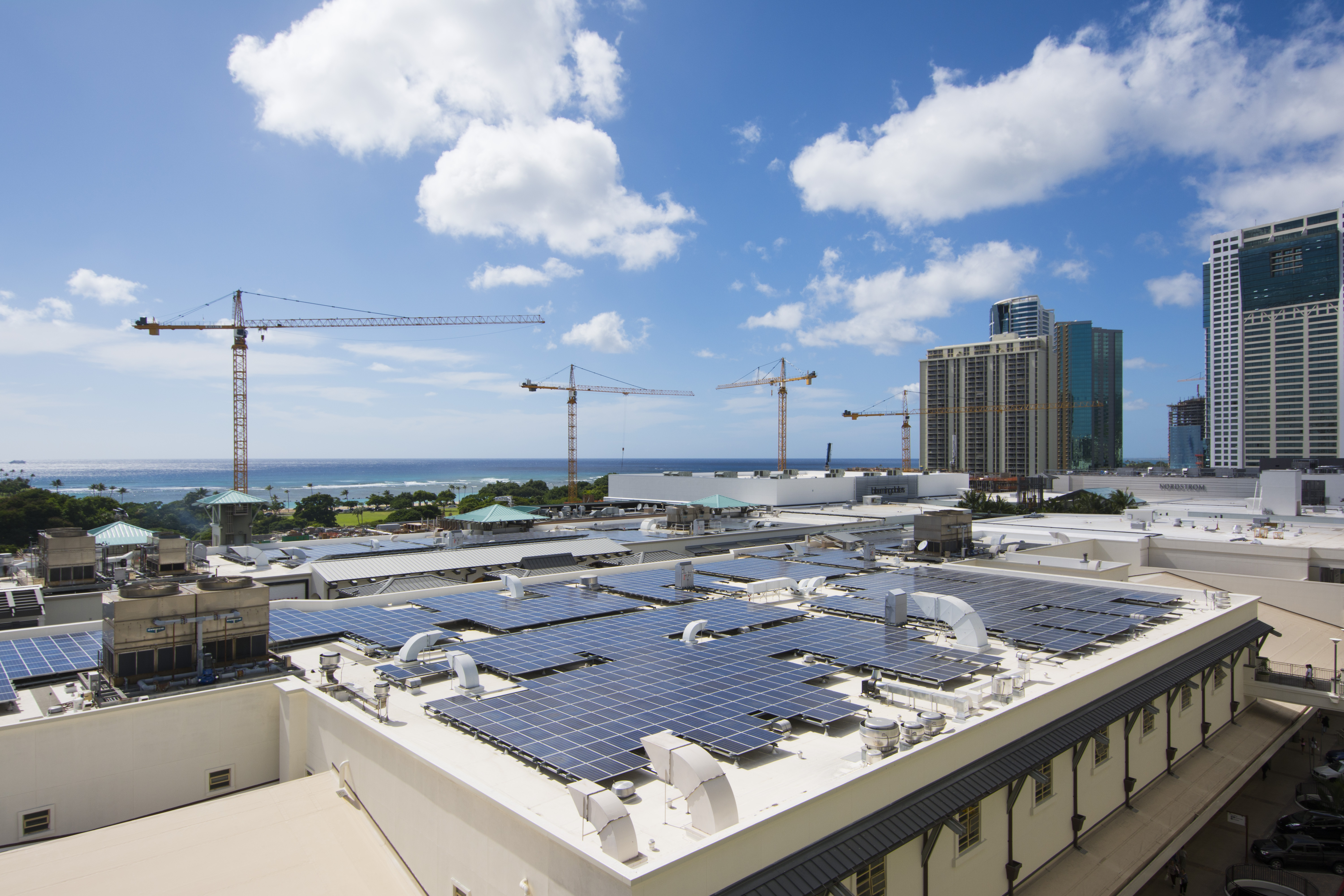
Commercial rooftop solar installation in Honolulu

Hawaii has a renewable portfolio standard of 40% renewable energy by 2030 and 100% by 2045. Hawaii had almost 200 MW of grid-connected photovoltaics in 2012. 16 MW of PV were installed in 2010, 40 MW in 2011, and 109 MW in 2012.

The electrical grids of the Hawaiian islands are each separate and relatively small. "Overbuilding" distributed solar in some areas has led to issues such as partial duck curve, although time-of-use pricing has reduced disadvantages. Such overbuilding led the Hawaiian Electrical Company (HECO) to stop its net metering program, which reimbursed solar consumers generously for the excess electricity they exported back to the grid, in 2015. As a result, residential solar installations fell as homeowners could no longer justify the costs because the payback time of the rooftop solar system made it cost-prohibitive. Two successor programs - customer grid supply (CGS) and customer self-supply - have proved less successful than net-metering did in promoting the growth of the industry. HECO has made connecting to the grid more difficult, leading to layoffs among the solar installation industry. In 2014, there were over 40,000 rooftop systems, over 10 percent of customers. A proposed grid interconnection between Oahu and Maui would have allowed more renewable energy but was rejected as too costly. By 2022, nearly a third of single family homes have solar panels.

HECO has limited homeowners' ability to install solar and connect to the grid. As of 2022, the only program available for private systems to supply power to the grid, Customer Grid Supply Plus, has limited capacity and requires inverters that meet HECO specifications. Approved inverters must allow the company to remotely turn off power transmission to the grid as needed. The utility has gone full steam ahead with its own plans to build utility-scale solar, approving 110 MW on July 27, 2017.

Cyanotech has a 0.5 MW solar array on its algae farm at the Natural Energy Laboratory of Hawaii.

In October, 2018, Hawaii Electric Companies announced they were negotiating contracts on seven new solar farms to total 260 MW, each incorporating four hours of battery storage: These would be three projects on Oahu, two projects on Maui and two projects on Hawaii. In March 2019, six projects (totalling 247 MW and almost 1 GWh of battery storage) were approved, priced at 8-10c/kWh.

Sunrun is establishing a virtual power plant on Oahu which would use the energy stored in 1000 batteries located in individual houses with rooftop solar panels to deliver power in times of high energy demand on the grid. This system is expected to be online in 2020. These types of services provide not only additional power to the power grid but also add grid stability.

=== Kauai ===
Kauai has rapidly adopted solar. In 2009, oil provided 91% of the island's electricity. In 2015, solar provided 15% with other renewables providing another 22% with oil providing 63%. Diesel usage was expected to be reduced by 10 million U.S. gallons (38 thousand cubic meters) in 2016 compared to 2008. On some days in 2016, solar power provided 77% of the electricity generation on Kauai.

When it opened on November 2, 2015 on Kauai, the 12MW Anahola project was the largest solar project in Hawaii. It has 59,000 panels on 60 acres (24 hectares) of land and is expected to supply up to 20% of the island's momentary electricity demand and up to 5% of the annual demand. The Anahola project also incorporates a 6MW lithium-ion battery. The 12 MW Kapaia solar plant is connected to a 13 MW / 52 MWh battery, and the power is priced at 13.9 c/kWh. A 2018 project for 28 MW solar with 20 MW / 100 MWh batteries is priced at 11 c/kWh. A 44MW solar farm with batteries to be completed in 2019 will bring the island to 70% renewable electricity while a pumped-storage hydro facility is under consideration which could bring the island to 90% renewable by 2023.

== Statistics ==
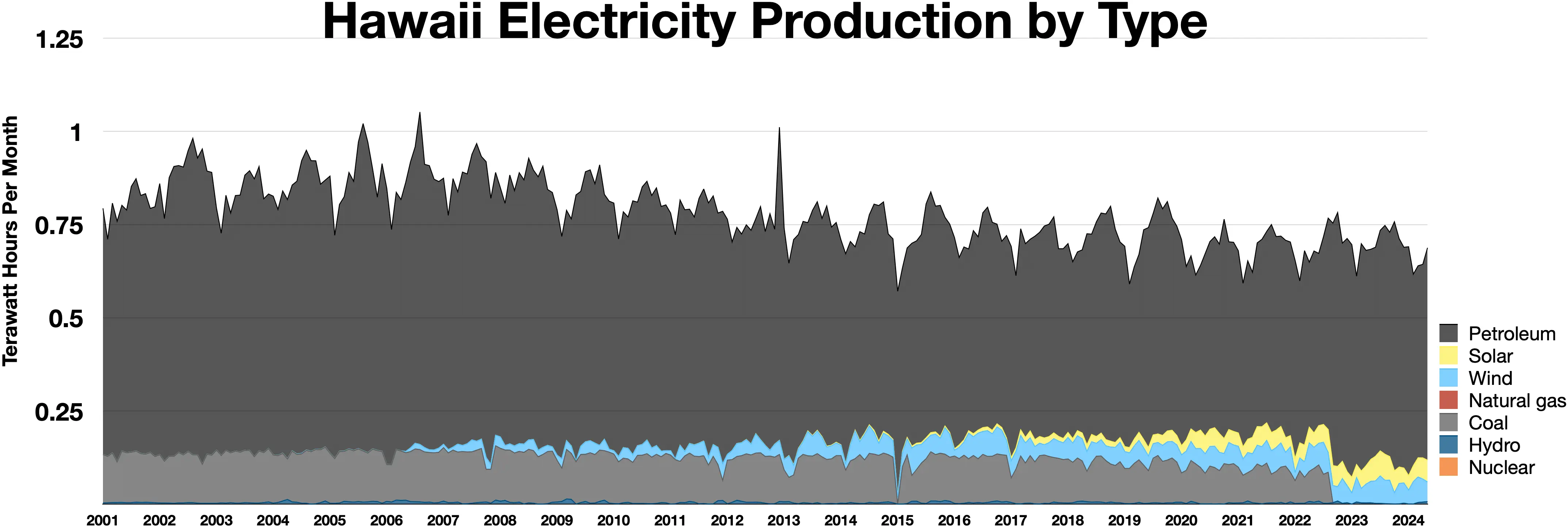
Hawaii electricity production by type

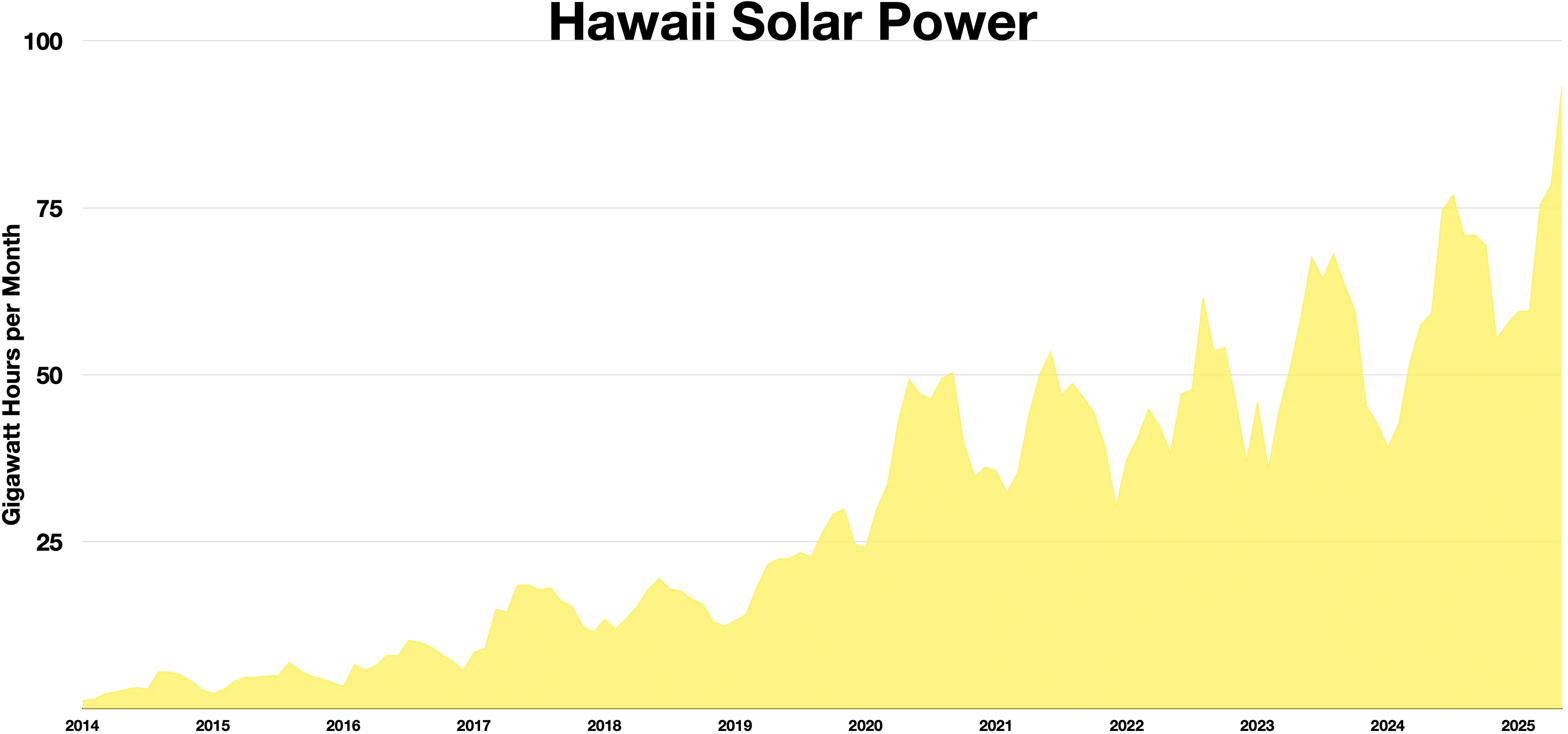
Hawaii solar power from 2014 to 2025

In 2012, a typical solar system in Hawaii paid for itself in only four years, and returned a profit of over four times the cost over its life. Hawaii's 35% ($5000.00 Maximum) state tax credit is the second highest in the country, behind Louisiana. Hawaii offers a feed-in tariff, but it does not meet the normal definition of a feed-in tariff, as it is less than the retail cost of electricity, and is therefore simply a power purchase agreement. The Oahu Wind Integration Study released a report detailing the impact on the Oahu grid and found that 500 MW of wind and 100 MW of solar power could provide Oahu up to 25% of its electricity while eliminating the need to burn approximately 2.8 million barrels of low sulfur fuel oil and 132,000 tons of coal each year.

In 2010, Hawaii generated 56 GWh of energy by photovoltaics; this rose to 2051 GWh by 2023.

This was only 0.07% of the state's total electricity generation in 2007 but had risen to 19.5% by 2024.

Grid-connected PV capacity (MW)
Year	Capacity	Installed	% change
2007	4.5	2.9	181%
2008	13.5	8.6	200%
2009	26.2	12.7	94%
2010	44.7	18.5	71%
2011	85.2	40.5	91%
2012	200	114	134%
2013	358	159	80%
2014	447	151	25%
2015	564	117	26%
2016	674	110	20%
2017	819	145	21.5%
2018	944	125	15.2%
2019	1,311.7	367.7	38.8%
2020	1,413.2	101.5	7.7%
2021	1,468.2	55	3.8%
2022	1,560	91.8	6.3%
2023	1,808	248	15.9%

Utility scale solar generation in Hawaii (GWh)
Year	Total	Jan	Feb	Mar	Apr	May	Jun	Jul	Aug	Sep	Oct	Nov	Dec
2015	55	2	3	4	5	5	5	5	7	6	5	4	4
2016	88	3	7	6	6	8	8	10	10	9	8	7	6
2017	174	8	9	15	14	19	19	18	18	16	15	12	11
2018	185	13	12	14	15	18	20	18	18	16	16	13	12
2019	267	13	14	18	22	22	22	23	23	26	29	30	25
2020	483	24	30	34	43	49	47	46	49	50	40	35	36
2021	520	34	32	39	48	53	54	50	50	48	43	39	30
2022	556	38	41	45	43	39	48	48	62	54	54	47	37
2023	643	42	35	47	49	59	66	68	70	64	59	44	40
2024	706	41	43	51	54	54	71	73	66	69	68	57	59
2025	968	59	59	76	78	93	94	106	99	98	80	70	56

Small scale solar generation in Hawaii (GWh)
Year	Total	Jan	Feb	Mar	Apr	May	Jun	Jul	Aug	Sep	Oct	Nov	Dec
2015	633	42	43	51	55	59	59	61	60	56	53	46	48
2016	760	52	54	62	66	71	71	72	73	67	63	54	55
2017	971	69	67	81	85	92	91	94	92	85	78	68	69
2018	1,029	74	71	86	90	96	98	99	96	89	83	73	74
2019	1,111	78	76	92	98	104	100	109	106	97	92	79	80
2020	1,210	84	87	99	107	114	113	115	115	106	97	86	87
2021	1,273	92	90	107	115	122	122	123	120	109	100	91	82
2022	1,329	97	95	112	117	125	125	127	125	114	106	93	93
2023	1,408	98	95	115	120	132	131	132	136	124	118	104	103

== Major solar installations in Hawaii ==
- December 2008: DuPont completed a solar power installation on Kauai that was expected to average 80 kW.
- December 2008: Sunetric, the largest solar installation company in the state, completed the largest roof-mount solar power installation in Hawaii at Kona Commons shopping mall.
- 2009: Sopogy completed construction on Hawaii's first concentrating solar power project. The project located at the Natural Energy Laboratories of Hawaii is a 2 MW solar thermal project interconnected into the Hawaiian Electric Industries grid under a Power Purchase Agreement.
- 2009: La Ola Solar Farm on Lanai was dedicated in January, with a design capacity of 1.5 MW (1.2 MW_{AC}). After operating at 600KW due to variable cloud cover, in September 2010 Xtreme Power announced plans to incorporate their battery storage technology to bring the system up to design capacity. It is the first photovoltaic power plant in the world to include battery storage.
- 2011: The Kapaa Solar Farm was completed, a 1.21 MW photovoltaic array, the largest in Hawaii, and the first on the island of Kauai.
- 2011: Kapolei Sustainable Energy Park on Oahu, 1.18 MW
- 2012: Port Allen Solar Facility on Kauai, 6 MW photovoltaic array with 3 MW battery storage
- 2012: Pearl City Peninsula Solar, Pearl Harbor Navy Base, 1.23 MW
- 2012: Kalaeloa Solar Power II, 5 MW, a photovoltaic array on Oahu
- 2013: Kalaeloa Renewable Energy Park, 5 MW, a photovoltaic array on Oahu
- 2014: Koloa (Grove Farm) 12 MW photovoltaic array, opened in July 2014 on Kauai
- 2015: Anahola, 12 MW photovoltaic array with 6 MW battery storage on Kauai, can produce 20% of Kauai's power during peak production.
- 2016: Waihonu Solar Farm North, 5MW and Waihonu Solar Farm South, 1.5 MW, Oahu
- 2017: Waianae Solar, 40 MW_{DC} (27.6 MW_{AC}), Oahu
- 2017: Kapaia solar project, 13 MW, with 52 MWh Tesla battery, on Kauai, to provide electricity only during the evenings
- 2017: Waipio Solar, Pearl Harbor Navy Base, 13.3 MW_{DC} (11 MW_{(AC)})
- 2017: Aloha Solar, 5 MW_{AC}, at Nanakuli, Oahu
- 2018: Kihei Solar Farm, 2.9 MW, Maui
- 2018: Ku'ia Solar, 2.8 MW, Maui
- 2019: Lāwa’i Solar (AES), 28 MW with 100 MWh storage, Kauai
- 2019: Waipio Solar project, 45.9 MW, Oahu
- 2019: West Loch Solar, 20 MW, Oahu
- 2019: Kawailoa Solar project, 49 MW, Oahu
- 2019: Lanikuhana Solar, 15 MW, Oahu, with 150 sheep in an agrivoltaic project
- 2020: Mililani Tech Solar I, 0.27MW, Oahu, first community solar project in Hawaii
- 2021: Kekaha Solar + Storage project, Kauai, 19 MW, with 70 MWh battery storage, on U.S. Navy Missile Range facility, can operate as a separate microgrid
- 2022 - Mililani I Solar, 39MW with 156MWhr storage
- 2023: Waiawa Solar, 36 MW, Oahu with 36 MW battery
- 2023: Waikoloa Solar, 30MW with 120MWhr storage, Hawaii
- 2024: West O‘ahu Solar, 12.5 MW solar and 12.5MW (50 MWh) battery
- 2024: Kūpono Solar, 42 MW + 168 MWh storage, Oahu
- 2024: Kuihelani Solar, Maui , 60MW with 240MWhr storage, the largest solar farm in the state, provides 15% of Maui's electricity
- Hawaii - Hale Kuawehi, 30MW with 120MWhr storage

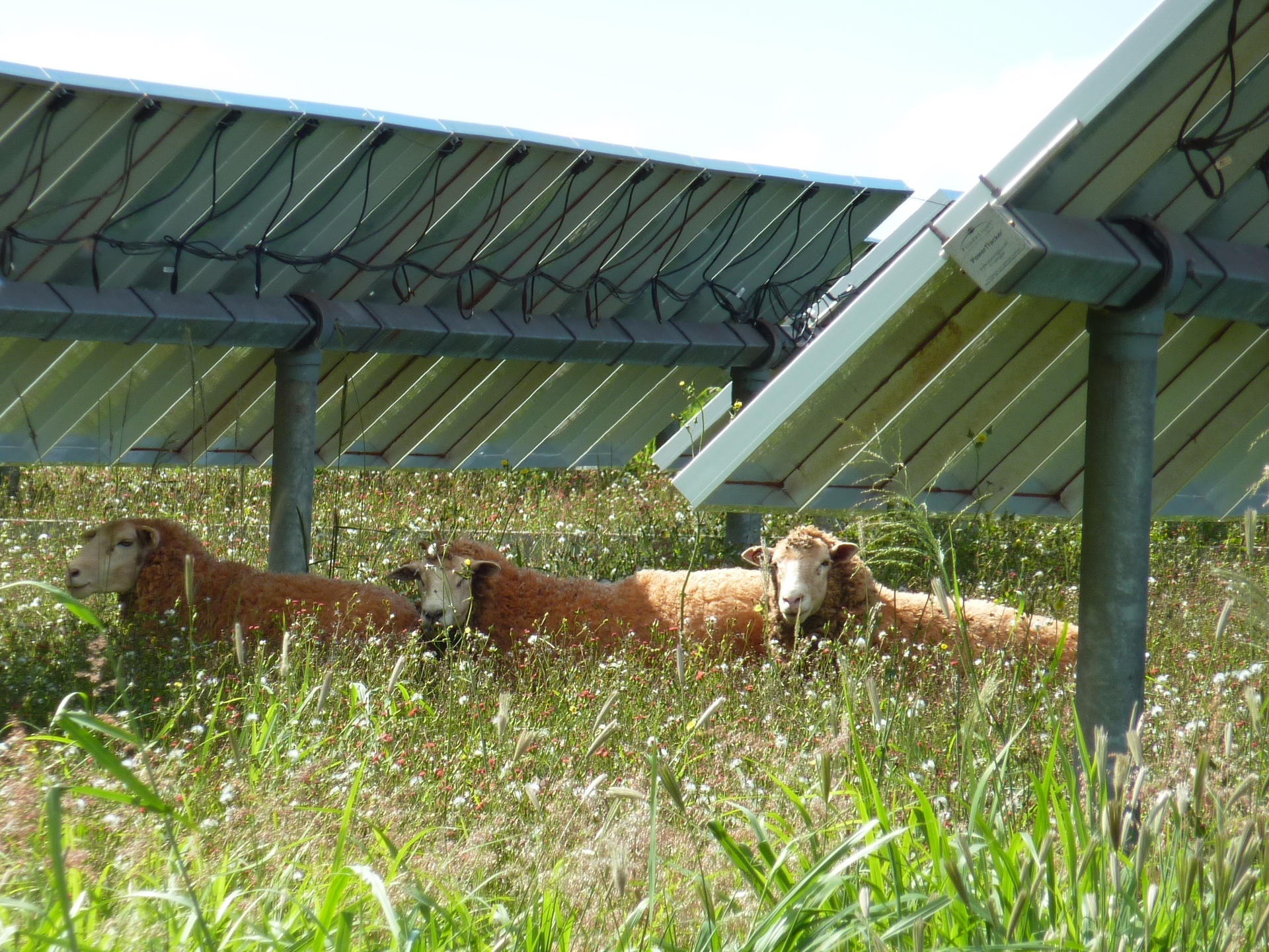
Sheep used for weed control at La Ola solar farm on Lanai. An example of agrivoltaics.

=== Projects under development ===
- Molokai – Pālā‘au Solar, 2.2 MW with a 10.1 MWhr battery
- Molokai – Kualapu‘u Solar, 0.250 MW with a 1 MWh battery
- Oahu - Ho'ohana Solar 1, 52MW with 208MWhr storage
- Oahu - Mahi Solar and Storage, 120 MW solar + battery, expected completion 2027
- Oahu - Makana La Oahu, 80 MW solar + battery, expected completion 2027
- Oahu - Waiawa Phase 2 Solar, 30 MW + 240 MWh storage
- Oahu - Mountain View Solar, 7 MW + 35 MWh storage
- Oahu - Puuloa Solar 6MW solar + battery, expected completion 2026
- Hawaii - Keamuku Solar, 86 MW solar + battery, expected completion 2030
- Hawaii - Puako Solar, 60 MW, solar + battery, expected completion 2028
- Hawaii - Kaiwiki Solar, 55 MW solar + battery, expected completion 2028
- Maui - Kuihelani Phase 2 Solar, 40 MW solar + battery, expected completion 2027
- Maui - Pulehu Solar & Storage, 20 MW solar + battery, expected completion 2027

=== Canceled projects ===
- Lanai - Lānaʻi Solar, 17.6 megawatts of solar energy with 3 MW reserved for the shared solar program, paired with a 73 megawatt-hour battery
- Molokai - Molokai New Energy Partners, 2.7 MW with 3 MWh battery, to be completed in 2019
- Oahu – Ka La Nui Solar Farm, 15 MW
- Oahu – Waiawa Solar, 50 MW
- Oahu – Mililani South Solar Park, 20 MW
- Oahu – IC Sunshine, 5 MW
- Oahu – Hoohana Solar, 20 MW

== See also ==
- Wind power in Hawaii
- Energy in Hawaii
- Solar power in the United States
- Renewable energy in the United States
