= Holaniku at Keahole Point =

Solar power plant on the island of Hawaiʻi

- Country: United States
- Location: Kona District, Hawaii
- Coordinates: 19°42′54″N 156°2′7″W
- Status: Operational
- Construction began: January 1, 2006
- Commission date: March 16, 2009
- Owner: Keahole Solar Power

Solar farm
- Type: CSP
- CSP technology: Parabolic trough
- Site area: 3 acres (12,141 m^{2})

Power generation
- Units operational: 1,000
- Nameplate capacity: 2 MW
- Capacity factor: 2%

Holaniku at Keahole Point is a 2MW micro-scaled concentrated solar power plant in the Kona District (west coast) of the island of Hawaiʻi. It is located in the Natural Energy Laboratory of Hawaii at Keahole Point.

Holaniku at Keahole Point is the first commercial solar thermal power plant to be built using solar collectors manufactured by Sopogy. The project was developed by Keahole Solar Power, LLC. an Engineering, Procurement, and Contracting (EPC) company. The plant contains over 1,000 Sopogy MicroCSP SopoNova parabolic trough solar collectors. The power plant uses the sun's heat to create steam. Most of the steam created is used onsite for other experimental uses, equating to only 0.5MW maximum that can be utilized to generate electricity. Little, if any, electrical power leaves the site and enters the state electrical grid.

== See also ==
- List of concentrating solar thermal power companies
- List of photovoltaic power stations
- List of solar thermal power stations
- Renewable energy in the United States
- Renewable portfolio standard
- Solar power in the United States
- Solar power in Hawaii
