= Sunetric =

Hawaian power company

- Type: Private
- Industry: Solar Energy
- Founded: 2004
- Founder: Sean Mullen and Beth Ann Mullen
- Headquarters: Kailua, Hawaii, U.S.
- Area served: Hawaiian Islands
- Key people: Sean Mullen (Founder), Alex Tiller (CEO)
- Products: Photovoltaic installations
- Owner: Sean Mullen (Founder and majority shareholder)
- Number of employees: 80+ (2010)
- Website: sunetric.com

Sunetric is a Hawaii-based photovoltaic solar power company that performs consultation, design, and installation of photovoltaic systems for residential, commercial, military, and non-profit customers. Sunetric operates on all of the Hawaiian islands and in several states in the continental US. The company was founded in 2004 as Suntech Hawaii by Sean Mullen. Alex Tiller is the company's CEO. The company handles system consulting, design, and installation, and remains responsible for maintenance, monitoring, and repairs.

Sunetric Capital, LLC is a separate entity that provides funding via capital investment for the Sunetric Power Plan, a Power Purchase Agreement designed by Mullen and Tiller whereby the company pays for the up-front costs of commercial projects and acts as owner and maintainer while customers (host) pay for the electricity generated by the renewable energy system. This reduces the initial cost to the business-owner or nonprofit entity.

Sunetric's push for photovoltaic installations is of particular import to the State of Hawaii, which, despite having already reached grid parity, relies on fuel imports for 90% of its energy needs, making it an ideal candidate for energy independence. Photovoltaic customers in Hawaii qualify for both a 35% state tax rebate and a 30% federal tax rebate on all photovoltaic installations.

According to the Honolulu Department of Planning and Permitting photovoltaic permit records, Sunetric performs, on average, the installation and activation of 40% (the majority market share) of net-metered photovoltaic systems in Hawaii. Since its founding in 2004, the company has performed approximately 3,583 residential solar power installations and approximately 109 commercial installations, totaling over 60 megawatts throughout the islands.

In December 2008, Sunetric completed both the largest roof-mounted photovoltaic installation in Hawaii on top of Kona Commons shopping mall and the second-largest solar farm in Hawaii at Wilcox Memorial Hospital on Kauai. The Wilcox Memorial Hospital installation comprises 2,190 solar panels connected to 3 solar inverters with a rating of 504 kilowatts.

Since 2006, the company has installed more than 2 megawatts of photovoltaic systems for military bases in Hawaii, including Schofield Barracks, Fort Shafter, Hickam AFB, Bellows AFB, and Aliamanu Military Reservation. The company is responsible for a photovoltaic system used to power the hydrogen fuel cell plant at Hickam Air Force Base.

== SunPower ==
In early 2010, Sunetric became Sunpower's first Accredited Elite Dealer. Sunpower is a manufacturer of high-efficiency solar cells and modules.

== Suniva ==
In late 2011, Sunetric became the First and Exclusive distributor / installer of Suniva Solar Modules, a high-efficiency manufacturer of solar cells and modules. Suniva has developed patented low-cost methods to produce high-efficiency and high-reliability modules.

In February 2012, Sunetric also became Suniva's first Master Installer Certified contractor, having installed over 3,000 Suniva modules.

== See also ==
- Solar power in Hawaii
