= AES Barbers Point Plant =

Former coal-fired power plant in Oahu, Hawaii

- Country: United States
- Location: near Kalaeloa, Hawai'i
- Coordinates: 21°18′12″N 158°06′22″W
- Status: Decommissioned
- Commission date: May 1992
- Decommission date: September 2022
- Owner: AES Hawaii

Thermal power station
- Primary fuel: Subbituminous coal, tires
- Turbine technology: Steam turbine
- Cooling source: closed-loop, cooled by forced air convection

Power generation
- Nameplate capacity: 203 MWe

AES Barbers Point Plant was a medium-size coal-fired electrical power station located in the south-west corner of the Hawaiian island of Oahu. Owned and operated by AES, the plant was the only coal-fired power plant in the state of Hawaii and was the state's leading single source of toxic pollutants. AES Barbers Point Power Plant consisted of a single unit on the grounds of Campbell Industrial Park, had a year-around capacity of 180 MWe, and in 2006 represented about 11% of Oahu's commercial electricity supply.

The plant closed on September 1, 2022, as part of a state goal to reduce greenhouse gas emissions. AES indicated that the facility could be repurposed to burn biofuels instead of coal, though such a conversion could take years to complete.

== Fuel sources ==
While in operation, the AES Barbers Point Power Plant burned approximately 650,000 tons of subbituminous coal each year. The coal was imported from Indonesia via a marine terminal at the Barbers Point Harbor. From there, coal was taken to the plant by a 1.6-mile (2.6 km) long conveyor system.

In addition to coal, the plant used alternate fuel sources, such as old tires and used motor oil, to help power the plant. The plant also burned carbon from Board of Water Supply filters.

The ash waste product created by AES was used in concrete mixes. In negotiations between Hawaiian Electric Company and AES in 2014, it was asked that the plant be converted to run partly on biomass.

== Environmental impact ==
AES introduced limestone early into the coal-combustion process, filtering out harmful sulfur dioxide early. Most coal plants use industrial scrubbers to remove harmful pollutants late in the combustion process, which have a higher cost, but are much more efficient, removing as much as 98% of SO_{2}, compared to the 75% removal rate at AES.

According to U.S. Environmental Protection Agency data, the AES plant was the leading source of toxic pollutants in the State of Hawaii, producing 662,599.80 pounds (300,550.21 kg) in toxic releases in 2013. This represented a pollutant increase for the plant of more than 100% from 2012.

== Exemption from fossil fuel tax ==
In 2015 the Hawaii State Legislature passed, and Governor David Ige signed a bill that applied the state's tax on petroleum products to all other fossil fuels. The tax specifically exempted coal-powered utilities that operated under power purchase agreements that were in effect before June 30, 2015. The exemption had the effect of exempting the AES Barbers Point Power Plant from the fossil fuel tax. Environmental groups criticized this move, questioning why coal-fired power plants should be exempted when all other types of fossil fuels, including petroleum, propane, and liquified natural gas, would be subject to the expanded tax.
