= Cellana (company) =

American bioproduct company

Cellana, Inc.
- Formerly: HR BioPetroleum (2004–11)
- Company type: Private
- Industry: Omega-3 supplements, plant-based proteins, Energy
- Founded: 2004; 22 years ago in Kailua-Kona, Hawaii
- Founders: C. Barry Raleigh, Ph.D. Mark Huntley, Ph.D.
- Headquarters: Kailua-Kona and San Diego, U.S.
- Key people: Martin A. Sabarsky, CEO; Avery Kramer, VP of Operations
- Products: ReNew algae, omega-3, algae oil, animal feed
- Number of employees: 15
- Website: cellana.com

Cellana, Inc. is an American company which develops of algae-based bioproducts for high-value nutrition, ink, and bioenergy applications, including Omega-3 nutraceutical applications, sustainable ink, aquaculture and animal feeds, human food ingredients, pigments, specialty chemicals, and biofuels. The company, with offices in Hawaii and San Diego, has received (or has been a member of consortia that have received) multiple multimillion-dollar grants from the United States Department of Energy and United States Department of Agriculture.

KDF is located on a 2.5-hectare (6.2-acre) parcel of land leased from the Natural Energy Laboratory of Hawaii Authority (NELHA), which is located on the west shore of the island of Hawaii. NELHA pipes in a constant supply of fresh ocean water. NELHA was originally built to support a DOE project for ocean thermal energy conversion, and it continues to employ the project's seawater supply pipes to support a variety of research projects and commercial enterprises, including facilities that currently grow and harvest microalgae for pharmaceuticals and nutritional supplements. Cellana's facility grows only non-genetically modified, marine microalgae species using proprietary technology.

== History ==
Cellana, Inc. was founded in 2004 as "HR BioPetroleum, Inc." and changed its name to Cellana, Inc. in May 2011. On January 31, 2011, Cellana LLC, a joint venture company formed by Royal Dutch Shell and HR BioPetroleum in 2007, became a wholly owned subsidiary of HR BioPetroleum, Inc./Cellana, Inc. Shell had previously announced on December 11, 2007, that it entered into a joint venture with HR BioPetroleum to, among other things, build and operate a demonstration facility in Hawaii for growing algae as a source of biofuels. This 2.5-hectare facility, known as the Kona Demonstration Facility (KDF), was completed and commissioned in 2009.

The original goal of the facility was to cultivate algae in photobioreactors and open raceway ponds filled with seawater using a proprietary process, then harvest the algae and extract oil for conversion into fuels such as biodiesel and utilize the residual high protein algae meal for additional co-products.

In 2018, Cellana and POS Bio-Sciences announced the signing of a letter of intent for the joint development and commercialization of high-value EPA Omega-3 oils from Cellana's algae biomass. In December 2016, the United States Department of Energy published a funding opportunity announcement in which Cellana's lead commercial algae strains KA32 and CO46, and the biomass yields demonstrated from these strains as part of the DOE-funded Algae Testbed Public-Private Partnership (ATP3), were designated as DOE's "State of Technology" for the photosynthetic algae sector in the United States. In 2013, Cellana and Neste Oil, the world's largest refiner of renewable diesel, announced the signing of a multi-year, commercial-scale off-take agreement for algae-based biocrude oil.

In 2024, Cellana and PhytoSmart, a producer of algae-based pet supplements, signed a merger agreement, pursuant to which PhytoSmart will become a wholly owned subsidiary of Cellana upon closing of the merger. PhytoSmart's first commercial products — whole algae pet supplements containing DHA and EPA Omega-3 oils, are sold on Amazon and directly on the company's website, www.PhytoSmart.com.
