= Hawaiian Electric Industries =

American utility company

Hawaiian Electric Industries, Inc.
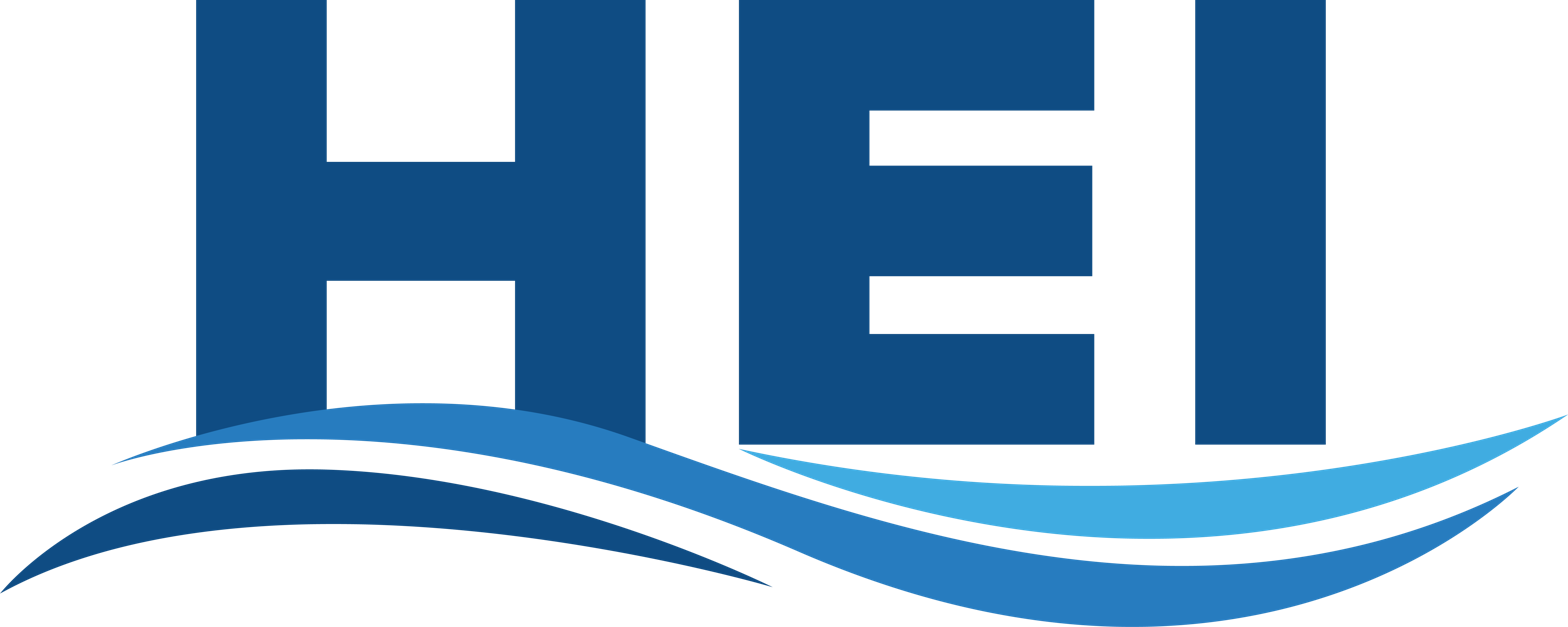
- Type: Public
- Traded as: NYSE: HE; Russell 2000 component; S&P 600 component
- Founded: October 13, 1891; 135 years ago
- Headquarters: Honolulu, Hawaii, U.S.
- Revenue: ▼US$3.09 billion (2025)
- Operating income: ▲US$235 million (2025)
- Net income: ▲US$123 million (2025)
- Total assets: ▼US$8.92 billion (2025)
- Total equity: ▲US$1.61 billion (2025)
- Number of employees: 2,675 (2025)
- Subsidiaries: Hawaiian Electric Company, Inc. Hawai'i Electric Light Company, Inc. Maui Electric Company, Limited; Pacific Current LLC
- Website: hei.com; hawaiianelectric.com

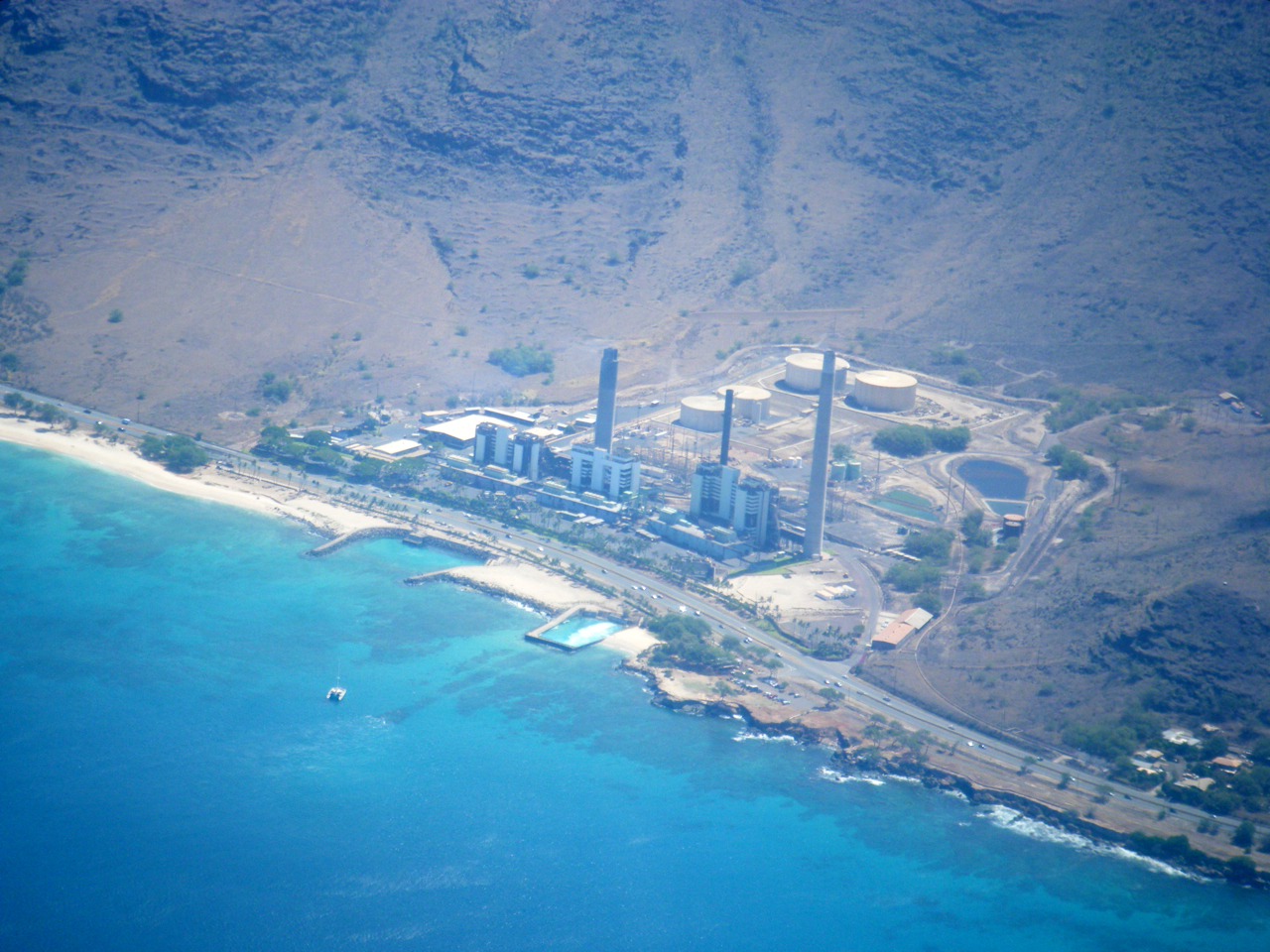
HECO power plant at Kahe Point in West Oahu

Hawaiian Electric Industries, Inc. (HEI) is the largest supplier of electricity in the U.S. state of Hawaii, supplying power to 95% of Hawaii's population through its electric utilities: Hawaiian Electric Company serving Oahu, Hawai'i Electric Light Company serving The Big Island, and Maui Electric Company serving Maui, Lanai and Molakai.

Hawaiian Electric Company (abbreviated HECO and pronounced HEE-coh), Hilo Electric Light Company (later renamed Hawai'i Electric Light Company, abbreviated HELCO and pronounced HEL-coh), and Maui Electric Company (abbreviated MECO and pronounced MEE-coh) employ more than 2,000 people. Approximately 20,000 Hawaii residents are shareholders of HECO’s parent company, Hawaiian Electric Industries. The company is headquartered in Honolulu.

The island of Kauai is the only Hawaiian island not supplied by HEI. Instead, the consumer-owned Kauai Island Utility Cooperative manages that island's electricity.

== History ==
Hawaiian Electric Company incorporated on October 13, 1891. Thus, Hawaiian Electric Company began while the independent country of the Kingdom of Hawaii existed. Within about 16 years, the utility had 2,500 customers on Oahu. By 1914 HECO had started rural service to the windward side of the island and was marketing electric products like refrigerators and flat irons. In 1937 HECO broke ground on its second power plant, and transmission lines soon crisscrossed Oahu.

=== War and statehood ===
During World War II, HECO power plants linked to US military bases, generating more than one million kilowatt hours of electricity each day. (= > 42 MW average power).

Hawaii became a US state in 1959, and by then Oahu was entirely electrified. HECO opened a 116 MW plant in downtown Honolulu in 1954. The state's first reheat steam turbine generator went on line at Kahe on the west coast of Oahu. Today, Kahe is the state's largest plant with a total generating capacity of 650 MW.

=== Island expansion ===
HECO purchased Maui Electric Company in 1968. In 1970, HECO acquired the Hawaii Island's Hilo Electric Light Company. In 1988 MECO acquired the Lāna‘i City power plant on the island of Lānaʻi, and in 1989, Molokai Electric Company on the island of Molokaʻi. Hawaiian Electric Industries, Inc. (HEI) was created as a holding company for these various utilities in 1983. In 2013, HECO began working with Siemens to develop a self-healing grid in eastern Oʻahu and Waikīkī to ensure a reliable electrical supply.

On December 4, 2014, NextEra Energy tendered an offer to purchase HEI for $4.3 billion (equivalent to $5.6 billion in 2024). The sale required approval by the Hawaii Public Utilities Commission. On July 18, 2016, it was announced that the merger was cancelled after the Public Utilities Commission disapproved the deal. The merger included plans to convert HEI's oil-fired generating plants to run on natural gas, which were to use liquified natural gas imported from a British Columbia plant of FortisBC. The upgrades were cancelled as they were dependent upon approval of the merger.

On December 24, 2019, HECO announced that it would begin operating under a single name with its subsidiaries MECO and HELCO—Hawaiian Electric.

=== Maui wildfires ===
On August 8, 2023, brush fires ignited on various parts of Maui. Fires in Lahaina and Upcountry caused widespread damage to populated areas, and the Lahaina fire was responsible for at least 102 deaths and an estimated $5.5 billion in damage. Power lines owned by Hawaiian Electric were blown down and over 12,000 people on Maui were left without power. Investigations are currently underway to officially determine what caused the fire, and they are currently looking into whether downed power lines and decisions by Hawaiian Electric were the cause of the deadly wildfires. Hawaii was experiencing high winds and was under a red flag warning when the wildfires broke out, which Hurricane Dora passing to the south may have contributed to.

After the catastrophic and deadly wildfires, Hawaiian Electric's stock severely plummeted approximately 40%, its lowest since 2010, after it was facing a class action lawsuit that alleged that Maui’s devastating wildfires were caused by the utility’s energized power lines that were knocked down by strong winds, and that it chose not to shut off its power lines ahead of the Maui wildfires, despite knowing the safety risks of sparking a fire in those kind of conditions. It also stated that Hawaiian Electric still refused to shut down power lines despite it knowing that some of its power lines were knocked out by the heavy, high speed winds. On August 23, it was reported that Hawaiian Electric had no procedure in place for turning off the grid — a common practice in other fire-prone states.

In July 2024, a tentative agreement was reached and Hawaiian Electric Industries, along with the State of Hawaii, Maui County, Kamehameha Schools and others would agree to pay thousands of plaintiffs and victims over $4 billion to settle the lawsuits.

== Generation ==
In 2023, power handled by HEI was 33.3% renewable. Hawai‘i Island set a record for HEI, generating a peak of 92.3% renewable power on April 25, 2023. In 2023 HECO generated 10.2 TWh, of which 3.4 TWh was renewable. The remaining generation, 6.8 TWh, came from oil.

Hawaiian Electric supports the adoption of electric vehicles. The company's goal is to have the majority of vehicles in Hawaii be electric vehicles by 2045. As of November 2018, EVs were 1% of all vehicles. Hawaiian Electric filed a road map with the state.

List shows HEI-owned power plants. Totals include power purchased from independent plant owners of various types and distributed solar.

=== Oahu ===
Oil-fired generators at Hawaiian Electric Kahe Power Plant in Kapolei on the Waianae Coast

HEI's total firm generating capability in 2023 is 1,614.5 megawatts serving 306,978 customers. Non-firm capacity was 987.6 megawatts. In 2022, 28% of power came from renewable resources, compared to 25% in 2020.

Oil	Megawatts (MW)
Waiau	499
Kahe	651
CIP	130
Solar	MW
West Loch Solar	20

=== Maui/Lanai/Molokai ===
Total firm generating capability in 2022 was 273.1 megawatts serving 73,933 customers. Non-firm capacity was 212.2 MW. 35.6% came from renewable resources, compared to 40.8% in 2020.

Oil	MW
Maalaea	212.1
Kahului	37.6
Lanai	9.4
Molokai	12.0
Hana (Dispersed generation)	2.0

=== Hawaii ===
Total firm generating capability in 2022 was 280.5 megawatts serving 88,757 customers. Non-firm capacity was 168.6 MW. 47.9% came from renewable resources, compared to 34.7% in 2020.

HELCO power plants (oil)	MW
Hill	34.7
Puna	36.7
Keahole	77.6
Kanoelehua	21.0
Shipman	15.2 – Decommissioned in December 2015
Waimea	7.5
Dispersed generation	5.0
Hydropower	MW
Pu‘u‘eo Hydro	3.4
Waiau Hydro	1.1

== Electric vehicles ==
Through a cooperative effort with HECO, High Technology Development Corporation (HTDC), an agency of the State of Hawai’i, initiated the Hawai’i Electric Vehicle Demonstration Project (HEVDP) consortium to develop an electric vehicle industry in Hawai’i. The islands had about 5,000 rechargeable vehicles as of 2017.

== Plans ==
In 2015, the Hawaii State Legislature amended the State's Renewable Portfolio Standards to establish the nation's first goal of 100% renewable energy:

Year	RPS %
2020	30%
2030	40%
2040	70%
2045	100%

Hawaiian Electric has indicated in its Power Supply Improvement Plan that it will achieve these goals ahead of schedule. From 2021, HEI transitioned away from cost of service to Performance Based Regulation.

== See also ==
- Energy in Hawaii
- Wind power in Hawaii
- Solar power in Hawaii
