= Cyanotech =

Cyanotech Corporation
- Company type: Public
- Traded as: OTCQB: CYAN; Nasdaq: CYAN (prior to 2024)
- Industry: Dietary supplements
- Founded: 1983; 43 years ago
- Founder: Gerry Cysewski
- Headquarters: Kailua Kona, Hawaii, United States
- Products: Bioastin, Spirulina
- Website: www.cyanotech.com

Cyanotech Corporation is a micro-algae producing company leasing land in the Natural Energy Lab of Hawaii on the Kona Coast of the island of Hawaii. The company produces BioAstin® Natural Astaxanthin and Hawaiian Spirulina Pacifica.

== History ==
Cyanotech was co-founded in 1983 by Gerry Cysewski. The Bioastin brand was approved by the FDA as the first generally recognized as safe product containing Astaxanthin in 1999.
