= Kauaʻi Island Utility Cooperative =

Electric cooperative in Hawaiʻi

- Type: Cooperative
- Industry: Electric utility
- Founded: 1905 (as Kauaʻi Electric); November 1, 2002 (formed as a cooperative)
- Headquarters: Līhuʻe, Kauaʻi, Hawaiʻi, United States
- Key people: Allan A. Smith, Chairman; David Bissell, CEO
- Products: Electricity
- Revenue: $154.9 million (2019)
- Number of employees: 145
- Website: www.kiuc.coop

Kauaʻi Island Utility Cooperative (KIUC) is an electric cooperative located on the island of Kauaʻi in Hawaiʻi. With roughly 38,695 member-owners represented by a nine-member board of directors, it is the only electric cooperative in the state of Hawaii.

== Energy history ==
In the 1970s, Kauaʻi burned sugar cane waste to supply most of their electricity.

As of 2008, the majority of the Kauaʻi's electricity was produced by importing liquid petroleum, costing $69.3 million in 2006 and $83 million in 2007. By 2011, 92% of KIUC's power came from petroleum.

As of 2019, KIUC's fuel mix was 47.2% fossil fuels, 10.5% hydroelectric, 9.9% biomass and 32.5% solar. KIUC has successfully integrated large-scale solar into its grid so that, during daylight hours on most days, 100 percent of its generation comes from renewable sources. In March 2017, KIUC commissioned a 13 MW solar and 13 MW / 52 MWh battery project for 13.9¢/kWh. In December 2018, KIUC commissioned a 28 MW solar and 20 MW / 100 MWh battery is priced at 11¢/kWh. A proposed solar-charged water pumping system will supply power throughout the night.

== Corporate history ==
Kauaʻi Electric was incorporated in 1905 as a subsidiary of McBryde Sugar in order to construct a 2.4 MW hydroelectric plant on the Wainiha River. Kauaʻi Electric merged with Lihue Plantation's Waiahi Electric Company early in the 1950s. Kauaʻi Electric became a division of Citizens Utilities Company in 1969. In the late 1990s, Citizens Utilities announced its intentions to divest from the electric utility business and a group of business leaders from Kauaʻi joined to found the Kauaʻi Island Utility Cooperative in 1999. KIUC purchased Kauaʻi Electric Company on 1 November 2002 for $215 million.

In December 2009, KIUC participated in hearings regarding its plan to minimize the effects its operations have on three endangered Hawaiian birds, the ʻuaʻu, the ʻaʻo, and the band-rumped storm-petrel.
