= Outrigger Resorts & Hotels =

Honolulu-based luxury hotel chain

- Industry: Hotel
- Founded: 1947; 79 years ago
- Founder: Roy and Estelle Kelley
- Headquarters: Hawaii
- Number of locations: 31
- Area served: Hawaii, Asia, Oceania
- Key people: Jeff Wagoner, President and CEO
- Website: www.outrigger.com

OUTRIGGER Resorts & Hotels is a Honolulu-based hotel chain and management company that operates resorts, hotels, and vacation condo properties in Hawaii, the Asia-Pacific region, and the islands of the Indian Ocean.

== History ==
The company was founded by Roy and Estelle Kelley, who opened their first hotel in 1947. Roy Kelley was an architect for Charles William Dickey and worked on many of Honolulu's landmark buildings, including the Immigration Station, Montegue Hall at Punahou School, the main building of the old Halekulani Hotel, and the former Waikiki Theater.

In 1963, Roy Kelley obtained the leasing rights to the former Outrigger Canoe Club site in Waikiki, which was owned by the Queen Emma Foundation and leased through the Waikiki Development Corporation. The Outrigger Canoe Club relocated to a new clubhouse site at the toe of Diamond Head, and Kelley developed the Outrigger Waikiki on the leased property.

In 1967, the OUTRIGGER Waikiki On The Beach hotel opened and became the first property to operate under the OUTRIGGER name. During the 1970s, the company expanded its hotel operations across Hawaiʻi. In 1982, OUTRIGGER acquired the Prince Kūhiō Hotel, its first property. By 1986, the company's room count exceeded 7,000, making it the largest hotel chain in Hawaiʻi at that time. In 1989, OUTRIGGER took over the Royal Waikoloan Hotel, and in 1993, the Kauaʻi Hilton was rebranded as the OUTRIGGER Kauaʻi Beach Hotel. In 1996, OUTRIGGER opened its first hotel outside the United States, the OUTRIGGER Marshall Islands Resort.

In 1999, OUTRIGGER spun off 15 properties to form OHANA Hotels and Resorts, a three-star hotel brand, while retaining the OUTRIGGER name for higher-end properties. By 2018, there were only two remaining OHANA Hotels.

By 2014, the hotel chain operated 11,000 rooms in 40 hotels worldwide and added 2 Fiji hotels to its list of properties. The company’s portfolio during this period included both owned and managed resort properties, as well as condominium resort properties operating under management agreements.

In 2014, OUTRIGGER Resorts & Hotels expanded into the Indian Ocean with the opening of the OUTRIGGER Mauritius Beach Resort on January 30, 2014. The resort is located in Bel Ombre on the southwest coast of Mauritius. A grand opening ceremony for the property was held on April 16, 2014. The resort marked the company’s first property in the Indian Ocean and represented an expansion beyond its established operations in Hawai‘i, Fiji, and parts of Asia.

OUTRIGGER entered the Maldives market in 2015 with the opening of the OUTRIGGER Konotta Maldives Resort on August 01, 2015. The resort was located in the Gaafu Dhaalu Atoll in the Maldives.

In 2022, the company expanded its presence in the country through the acquisition of the OUTRIGGER Maldives Maafushivaru Resort. The property was acquired, renovated, and rebranded by OUTRIGGER, reopening under the company’s management on April 01, 2022.

In March 2016, OUTRIGGER sold its four Australian hotels to the Mantra Group. In November 2016, the company entered into an agreement to be acquired by an affiliate of KSL Capital Partners, a Denver-based private equity firm focused on travel and leisure investments. At that time, OUTRIGGER's portfolio consisted of 37 hotels, condominiums, and vacation resort properties that were owned, operated, or managed by the company.

Jeff Wagoner was appointed president and chief executive officer, effective April 26, 2018. Scott Dalecio, co-founder and chief executive officer of KSL Resorts, who had served as interim chief executive officer since early 2017, was appointed executive chairman.

In January 2019, the company was reorganized and started working under OUTRIGGER Hospitality Group.The reorganization aligned the company’s resort and hotel management operations with other hospitality services, including condominium vacation rental management and destination retail management across its Hawaiʻi properties.

In 2020, OUTRIGGER announced an agreement to acquire the former Sheraton Kona Resort & Spa at Keauhou Bay on Hawaiʻi Island. The transaction was completed in the following year, when the property was rebranded as the OUTRIGGER Kona Resort & Spa.

In May 2023, the company received Green Seal certification for its sustainability initiatives. OUTRIGGER became the first company in Hawaii and the first hospitality brand outside the mainland US to receive the certification. In July 2023, the company purchased the Kā‘anapali Beach Hotel and its sister property, Plantation Inn, on Maui. The hotel was subsequently renamed the OUTRIGGER Kā‘anapali Beach Resort. In late August 2023, OUTRIGGER finalized the acquisition of Kauaʻi Beach Resort & Spa and rebranded it as OUTRIGGER Kauaʻi Beach Resort & Spa.

OUTRIGGER acquired Zeavola Resort in April 2025, marking its fourth location in Thailand. Following the acquisition, it’s being transformed and rebranded as OUTRIGGER Phi Phi Island Resort opening April 2026.

== Operating resorts and hotels ==
OUTRIGGER operates resorts and hotel properties in Hawaiʻi on the islands of Oʻahu, Maui, Kauaʻi, and Hawaiʻi Island. Outside Hawaiʻi, the company operates and manages resort properties in locations within the Asia-Pacific region, including the Fiji Islands, and Thailand, and has maintained resort operations in parts of the Indian Ocean region, such as the Maldives.

The company currently manages one property on the island of Oʻahu – Embassy Suites by Hilton Waikiki Beach Walk.

The company also manages condominium vacation rental properties through its Hawaii Vacation Condos by OUTRIGGER program. The platform manages privately owned residential units within resort and condominium complexes while providing centralized reservations, distribution, housekeeping, and property management services.

The company has also been involved in the management of retail and mixed-use spaces associated with its resort properties in Hawaiʻi, including resort retail areas connected to hotel complexes in Waikīkī and other resort districts.

== Other ventures and partnerships ==
In 2024, OUTRIGGER partnered with Cirque du Soleil Entertainment Group to present ʻAuana, a resident stage production at the OUTRIGGER Waikiki Beachcomber Hotel. The production features acrobatic performances, live music, and theatrical staging, and draws on Hawaiian cultural references in its choreography, costuming, and narrative structure. The production presented in a theatre space within the hotel.

OUTRIGGER properties host different food, beverage, and entertainment venues that are independently owned or managed. This includes Duke’s Waikiki and Hula Grill Waikiki restaurants at the OUTRIGGER Waikiki Beach Resort, operated in partnership with TS Restaurants, as well as the Blue Note Hawaiʻi live music venue located on the same property.

OUTRIGGER properties are also associated with other third-party businesses, including Maui Brewing Company locations, Blue Hawaiian tour operations, and Monkeypod Kitchen restaurants.
