= Eyman =

Eyman may refer to

- Eyman (surname)
- Arizona State Prison Complex – Eyman, a U.S. state prison
- Jessie Eyman–Wilma Judson House in Honolulu, Hawaiʻi
