= Waikiki Parc =

Luxury hotel in Honolulu, Hawaii

Coordinates: 21°16′41.81″N 157°49′50.38″W

This hotel has been renamed Halepuna Waikiki by Halekuna.

Waikiki Parc was a boutique hotel located in Honolulu, Hawaii, since renovated and rebranded as Halepuna Waikiki by Halekulani. The hotel contained 297 studio units. In the renovation that was redusced to 284 hotel rooms and 4 suites. The hotel features a rooftop heated swimming pool and fitness room and is the luxury sister property of Halekulani located just across the street on Gray's Beach in Waikiki.
