= ʻAuana (Cirque du Soleil show) =

Cirque du Soleil show

- Company: Cirque du Soleil
- Genre: Contemporary circus
- Show type: Resident show
- Date of premiere: December 17, 2024
- Location: Outrigger Waikīkī Beachcomber Hotel, Honolulu, Hawaii

Creative team
- Co-Creator & Director: Neil Dorward
- Cultural Creative Producer: Aaron J. Salā
- Costume Designer: Carrington Manaola Yap
- Choreographer: Kumu Hula Hiwa Vaughan
- Director of Production: John S. Barnett
- Production Design: Ravi Chandwani & Ryan Dilley
- Set Designer: Simon Guilbault
- Lighting Designer: Hugo Mercier-Bosseny
- Composer: Evan Duffy
- Props Designer: Tamlyn Wright
- Sound Designer & Head of Audio: Yianni Epivatinos
- Acrobatic Performance Designer: Philippe Aubertin
- Acrobatic Equipment Designer: Ewen Seagel
- Makeup Designer: Heidi Doucet
- Hair Designer: Vanessa Ashley

Other information
- Preceded by: Songblazers (2024)
- Succeeded by: Alizé (2025)
- Official website

ʻAuana is a Cirque du Soleil show at the Outrigger Waikīkī Beachcomber Hotel in Honolulu, Hawaii. It is a contemporary circus performance featuring acrobats, gymnasts, and other skilled performers. The show combines the traditional acrobatic and athletic performances of Cirque du Soleil with Hawaiian storytelling and dance. The show is Cirque du Soleil’s first ever resident production in Hawaii.

== History ==
In April 2023, Cirque du Soleil and Outrigger Hospitality Group announced that the existing showroom venue at the Outrigger Waikiki Beachcomber Hotel would be renovated to host a then-unnamed sit-down Cirque du Soleil production. In September 2024, tickets for the new production went on sale with preview performances to begin on December 5, 2024, and an official premiere date of December 17, 2024.

== Set and technical information ==
The theater housing ʻAuana previously hosted the Magic of Polynesia Show and The Don Ho Show. The show is performed in a 20,000-square-foot theater with 784 seats, making the venue the smallest to ever host a Cirque du Soleil residence production.

== Acts ==
The show contains the following acts:

- Holo Moana - Russian Swing
- The Golden Age of Waikiki - Icarian Games & Juggling, inspired by Hawai'i tourism industry from the 1920s through 1940s
- Hina - Goddess of the Moon - Aerial Lyra
- Nalu - A Tribute to Surf Culture - Rola Bola, performed on a surfboard
- Aloha ʻAina - Love for the Land - Sand Painting
- Mamala - The Surf Rider - Water Bowl
- Fire & Volcanoes - Pele's Brothers - Wheel of Life

=== Reserve acts ===
- Jump rope (October 2025 - Present)

=== Retired acts ===
- Juggling (December 2024 - August 2025)

== Music ==
The music for ʻAuana is composed by Evan Duffy, who also composed the music for Mad Apple. The official sountrack was released as a studio album by Cirque du Soleil and BMG Rights Management (BMG) on July 17, 2026.

The tracks on the official soundtrack are listed below:

1. Ka'i 'AUANA
2. Ala Moe
3. Hānau ka Moana
4. Kele ka Moana
5. Holunape ka Niu
6. Pō Mahina
7. Ka Nalu
8. Kai Māmala
9. Māui Kolohe
10. Pua Naupaka
11. Aloha 'Āina
12. Māui Ki'iki'i
13. Pele 'Ai Honua
14. Mimilo
15. Ke Ānuenue
16. Ho'i 'AUANA

== Critical reception ==
Honolulu Star-Advertiser, "Cirque du Soleil is known internationally for the mesmerizing aerialists and world-class specialty acts that make its show audience favorites. '‘Auana,' the Hawaii-themed Cirque show that officially opened Tuesday at the Outrigger Waikiki Beachcomber Hotel, checks off both of those boxes in impressive style."

HONOLULU Magazine, "Cirque du Soleil: ‘Auana at the Outrigger Waikīkī Beachcomber Hotel is a dazzling world-class production that intertwines Cirque’s signature artistry and acrobatics with Native Hawaiian elements."

Beat of Hawaii, "For Hawaii visitors and residents alike, ‘Auana is a decidedly fresh way to experience Hawaii’s stories through a new lens. The show honors the islands’ cultural heritage while delivering Cirque du Soleil’s artistry. It’s a rare blend of entertainment and cultural celebration that feels familiar and extraordinary at the same time."

Orange County Register, "[T]he Diamond Head-sized effort it took to bring '‘Auana' to Hawaii was evident in all 80 minutes of this heartfelt and heart-stopping production."

BuzzFeed, "The show did not disappoint, delivering a beautiful fusion of Hawaiian culture and circus magic."
