= Wailuku Civic Center Historic District =

Historic district in Hawaii, United States

- U.S. National Register of Historic Places
- U.S. Historic district
- Hawaiʻi Register of Historic Places
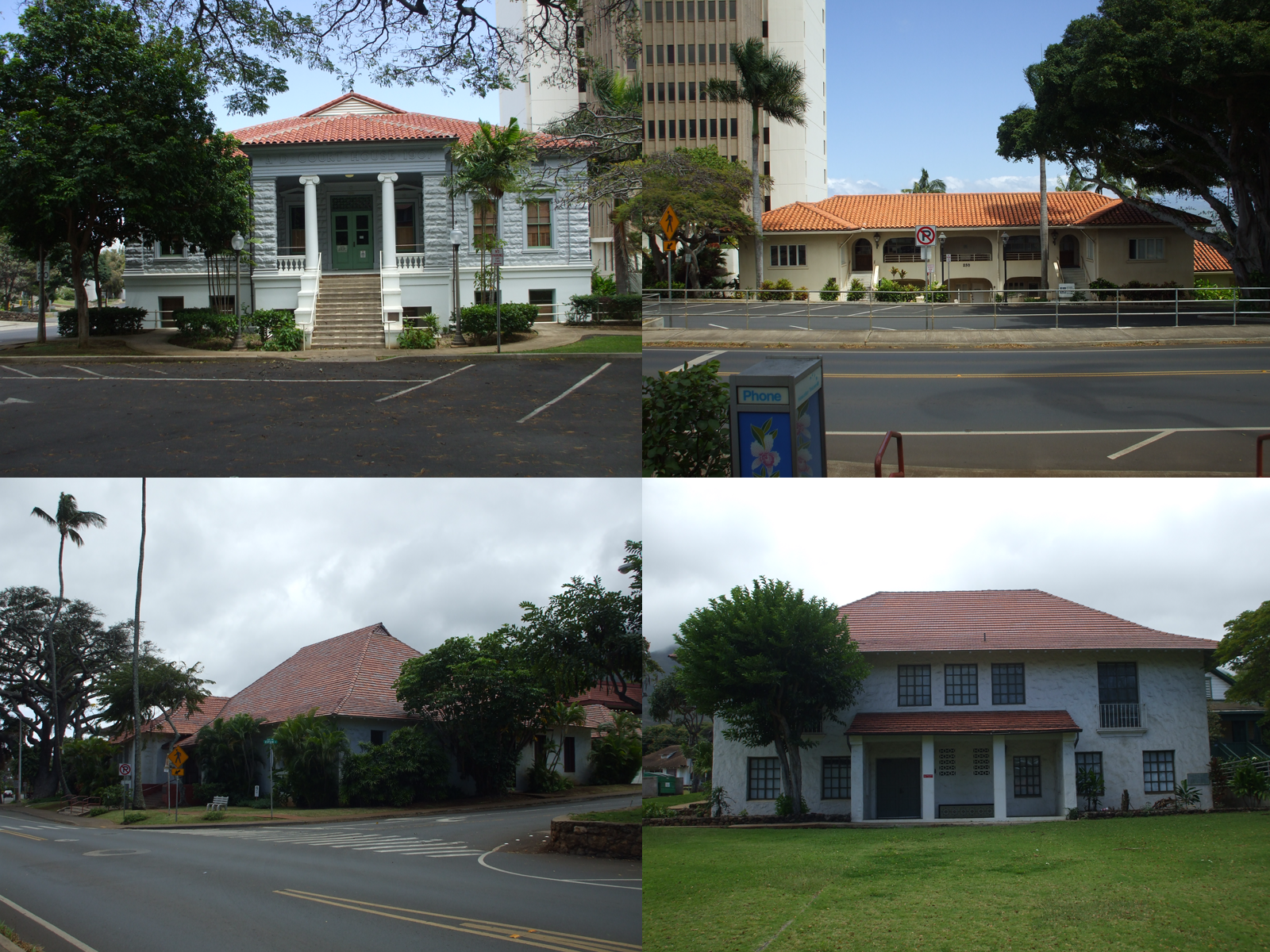
- The four buildings that make up the district, March 2010.

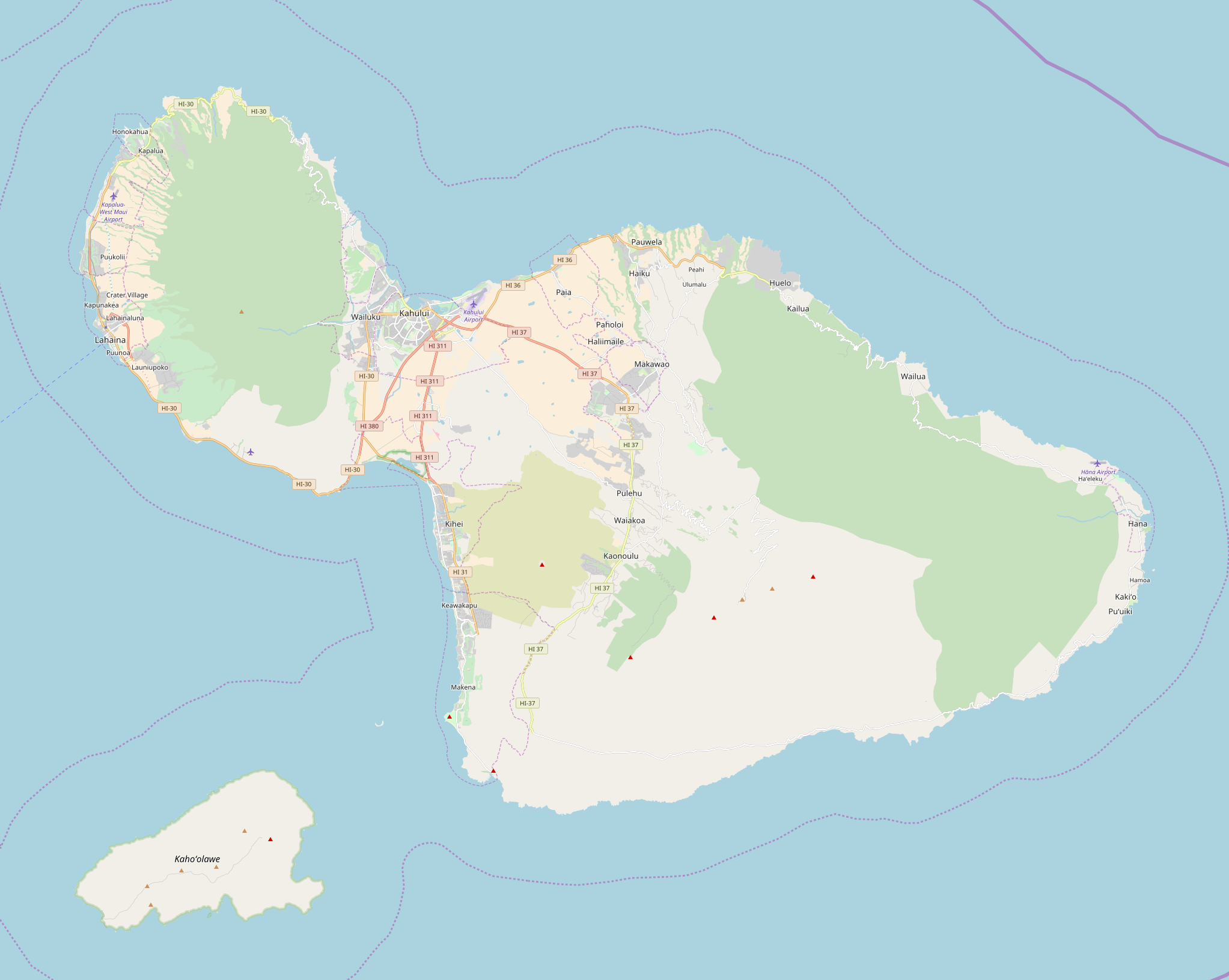
- Location within Maui Location within Hawaii
- Location: 150 South High Street (Courthouse); 250 South High Street (Old Police Station); 251 High Street (Library); 2264 Aupuni Street (Territorial Building)
- Coordinates: 20°53′25″N 156°30′26″W
- Area: 40 acres (160,000 m^{2}); 4 buildings
- Built: 1907 (Courthouse); 1925 (Old Police Station); 1928 (Library); 1931 (Territorial Building)
- Architect: Henry Livingston Kerr (Courthouse); William D'Esmond (Police Station); C.W. Dickey (Library/Territorial Building)
- Architectural style: Beaux-Arts (Courthouse); Mediterranean Revival (Old Police Station); Mediterranean Revival/Hawaiian (Library/Territorial Building)
- NRHP reference No.: 86001624
- HRHP No.: 50-50-04-01616

Significant dates
- Added to NRHP: August 20, 1986
- Designated HRHP: September 17, 1985

The Wailuku Civic Center Historic District is a group of four historic buildings and one non-contributing property in Wailuku, Maui Hawaii that currently house the governmental offices of both the County of Maui and the State of Hawaii. The historic buildings were built during a time span from 1901 to 1931. They incorporate several architectural styles and two of the four historic buildings were designed and built by Hawaii-based architect C.W. Dickey. The non-contributing property houses most of the County of Maui's main offices.

== Old Wailuku Courthouse ==
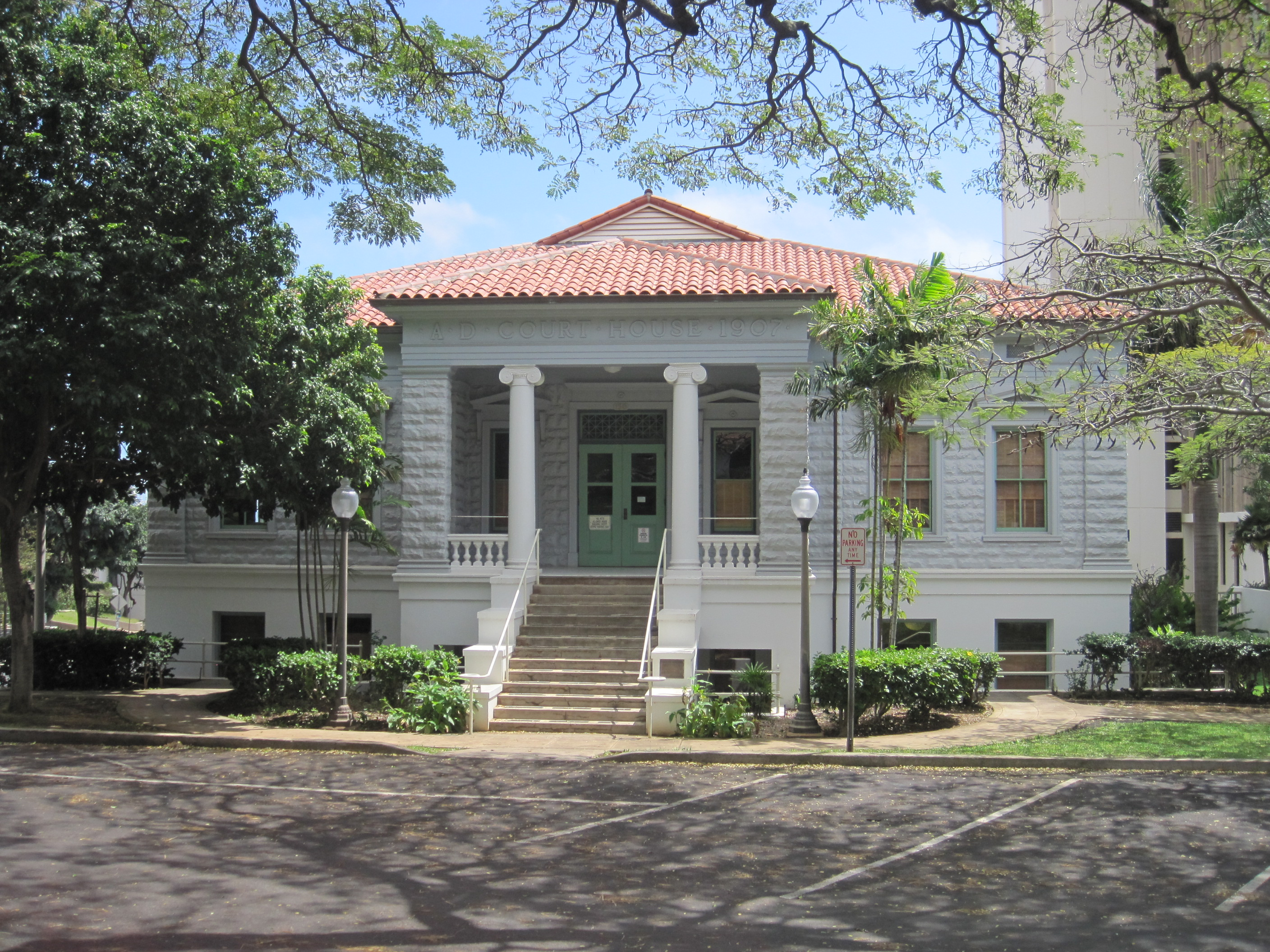

The Courthouse was built in 1907, allowing the court to move in 1908 from an inadequate facility just across the street (where the current Territorial Building now stands), which had been built in 1880. The old Courthouse was then used as Maui County's Town Hall.

Designed by Henry Livingston Kerr, the design incorporates Beaux-Arts architecture. The 7,000-square-foot (650 m^{2}), 68-foot (21 m) by 52-foot (16 m) structure is built of concrete block cast-like stone^{[a]} set upon a below-grade reinforced foundation that also houses another floor of office space. The "cast stone" was created onsite and patterned randomly to prevent repetition. This was deemed more economical than hauling quarried stone, though the blocks were just as difficult to install at 400 lb (180 kg) each. The current hipped wood-framed roof was installed in 1929, replacing the original flat roof which had been leaking. In 1962, a further 5,000 square feet (460 m^{2}) was added to the courthouse, which included the addition of a basement.

The building's use as a courthouse ended when a new Circuit Court building was built just down the street. Bought by the County of Maui, it currently houses the offices of the Prosecuting Attorney.

== Kalana Pakui Building/Old Police Station ==
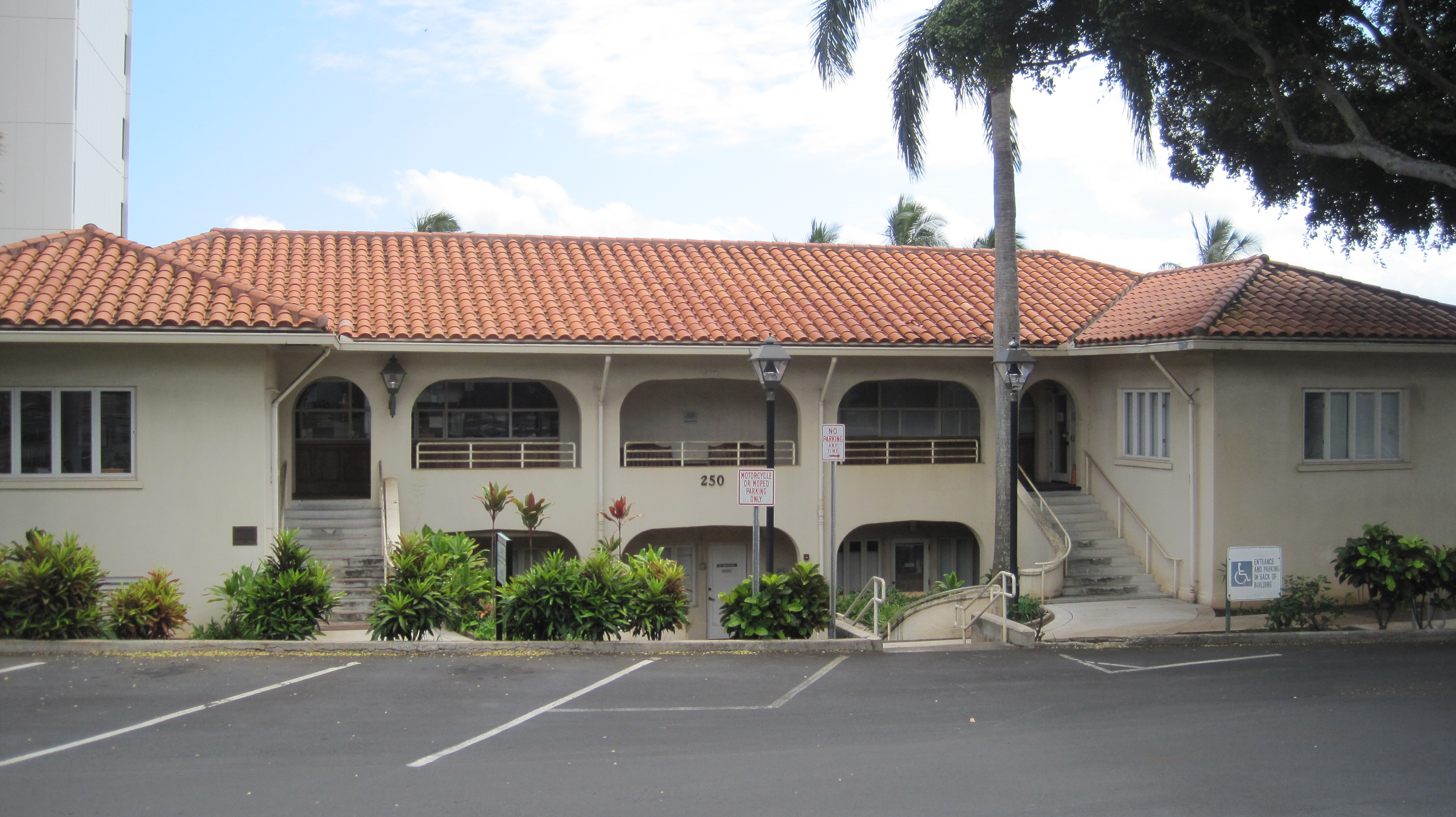

The Kalana Pakui Building was built in 1925 and designed by Maui architect William D'Esmond, incorporating Mediterranean Revival Style architecture. The building is built using reinforced concrete. It is two stories with one floor below grade, with a u-shaped floorplan. Arcaded lanais run across the main body of the building, with steps accentuated by curvilinear concrete railings, and capped by a low-pitched hip roof of Spanish tile. The building was originally used as a County Office Building, then as a police station; it is currently used as the Planning Department Offices for Maui County.

== Wailuku Library ==
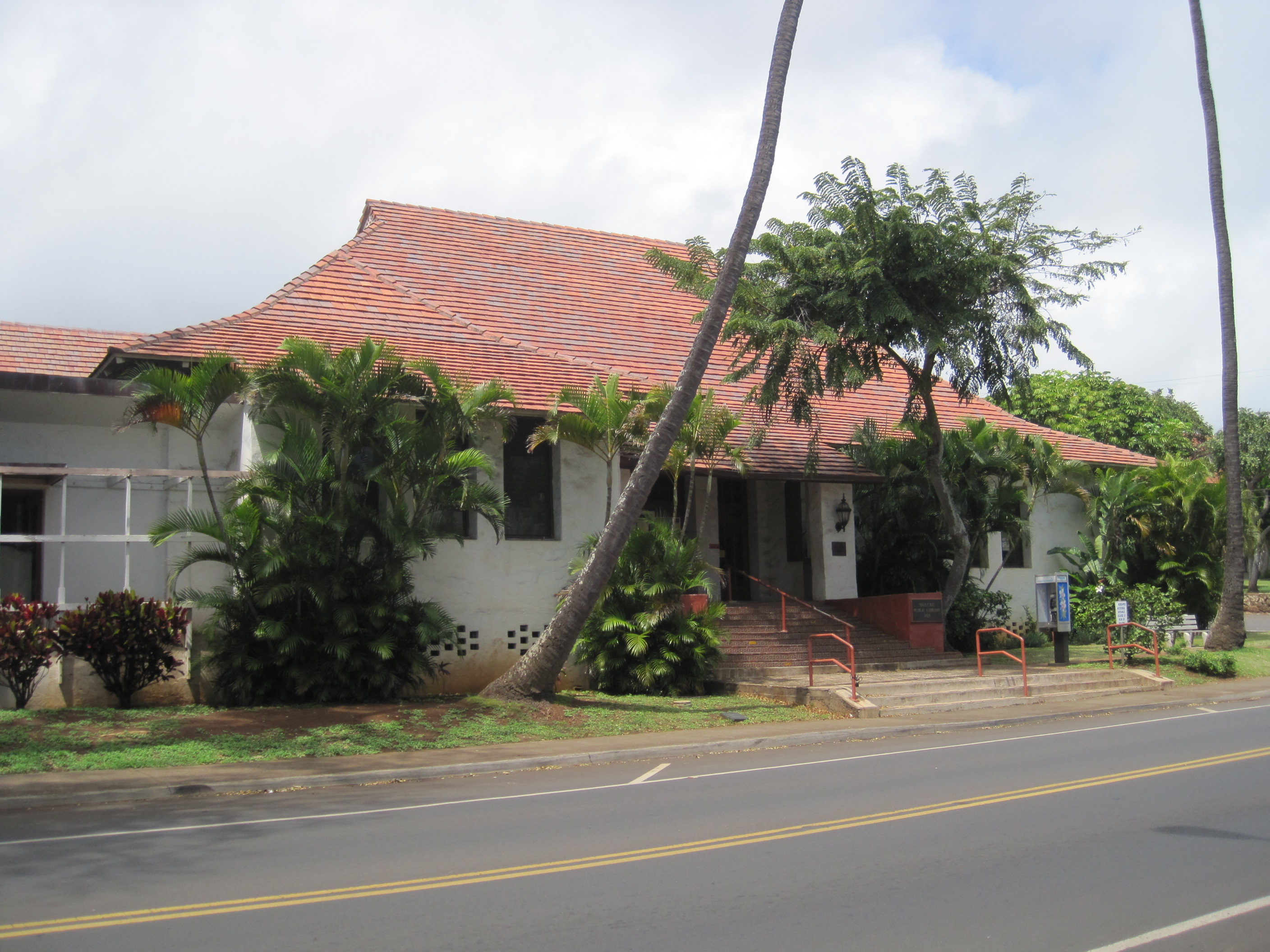

The current Wailuku Library was built in 1928 to replace another building on the same site used by the Maui County Free Library, which was created by the Maui Women's Club in 1919 as the first Library on Maui. Designed by Hawaii-based architect C.W. Dickey, the building incorporates both Mediterranean Revival & Hawaiian architecture cues. It is a single story asymmetrical building with a prominent double-pitched hip roof, which shelters the main building. The entryway features a tiled drinking fountain with a Silversword tiled motif. Two wings, each with lower but equally dramatic double-pitched hip roofs, extend to the right rear and left of the building. The walls are plastered, and contain long, thin casement windows. A large Monkey-Pod Tree sits to the west of the Library; it is the first site of Maui's first public telephone in 1878.

The library, operated by the Hawaii State Library System, is open Monday-Friday, and houses a Bookmobile.

== Territorial Building ==
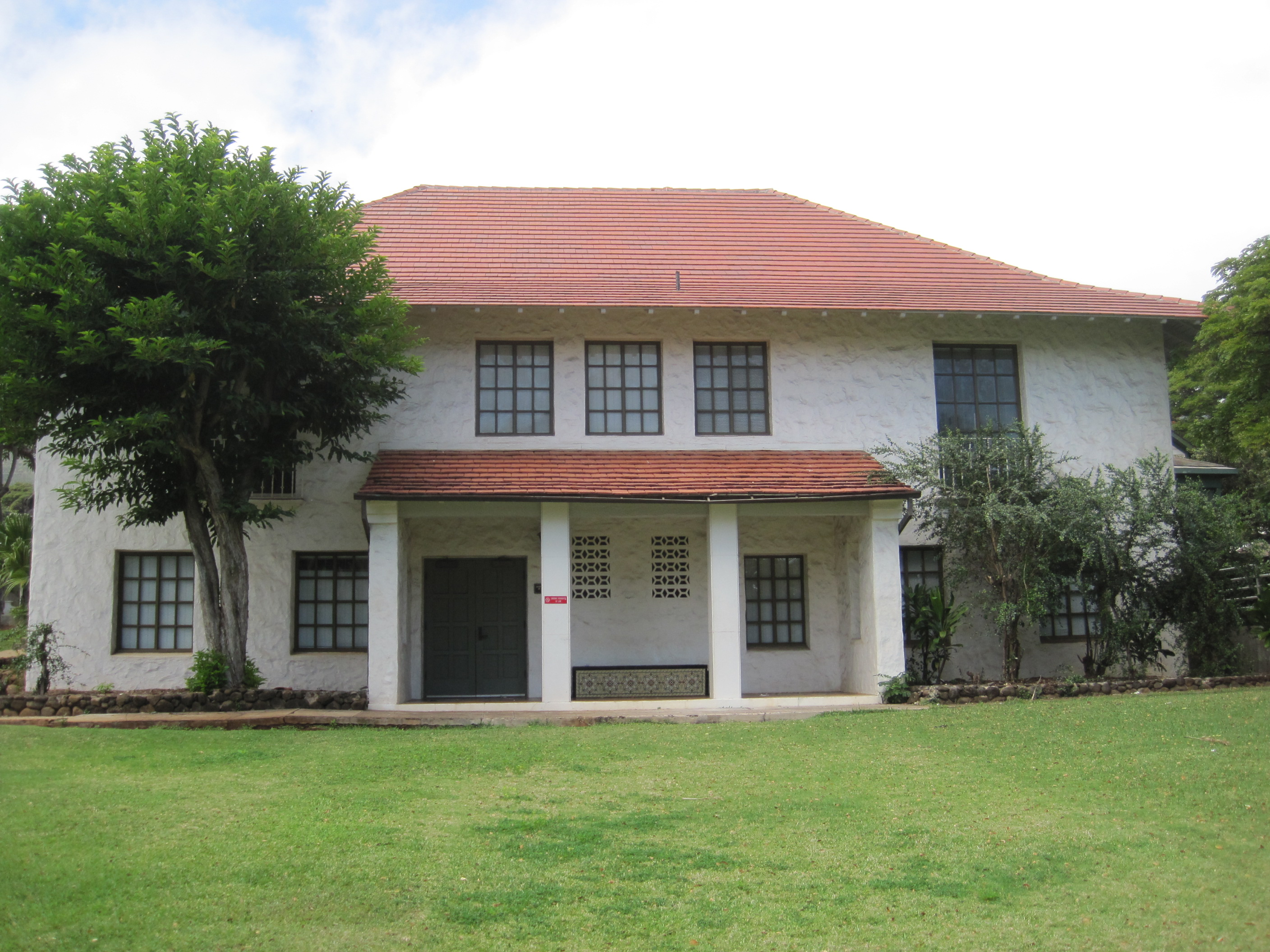

The Territorial Building was built in 1931, on the site of the former Courthouse/Town Hall for Maui next to the Ka'ahumanu Church. Designed by Hawaii-based architect C.W. Dickey, the building incorporates both Mediterranean Revival & Hawaiian architecture cues. The two-story stucco-covered stone building features a similar double-pitched hip roof like the library, with the addition of overhanging eaves and exposed rafters. A central entryway has a shed roofed lanai with decorative tiled elements, including a Spanish tile bench. Wrought-iron mock balconies, with French Doors, are to either side of the entryway lanai.

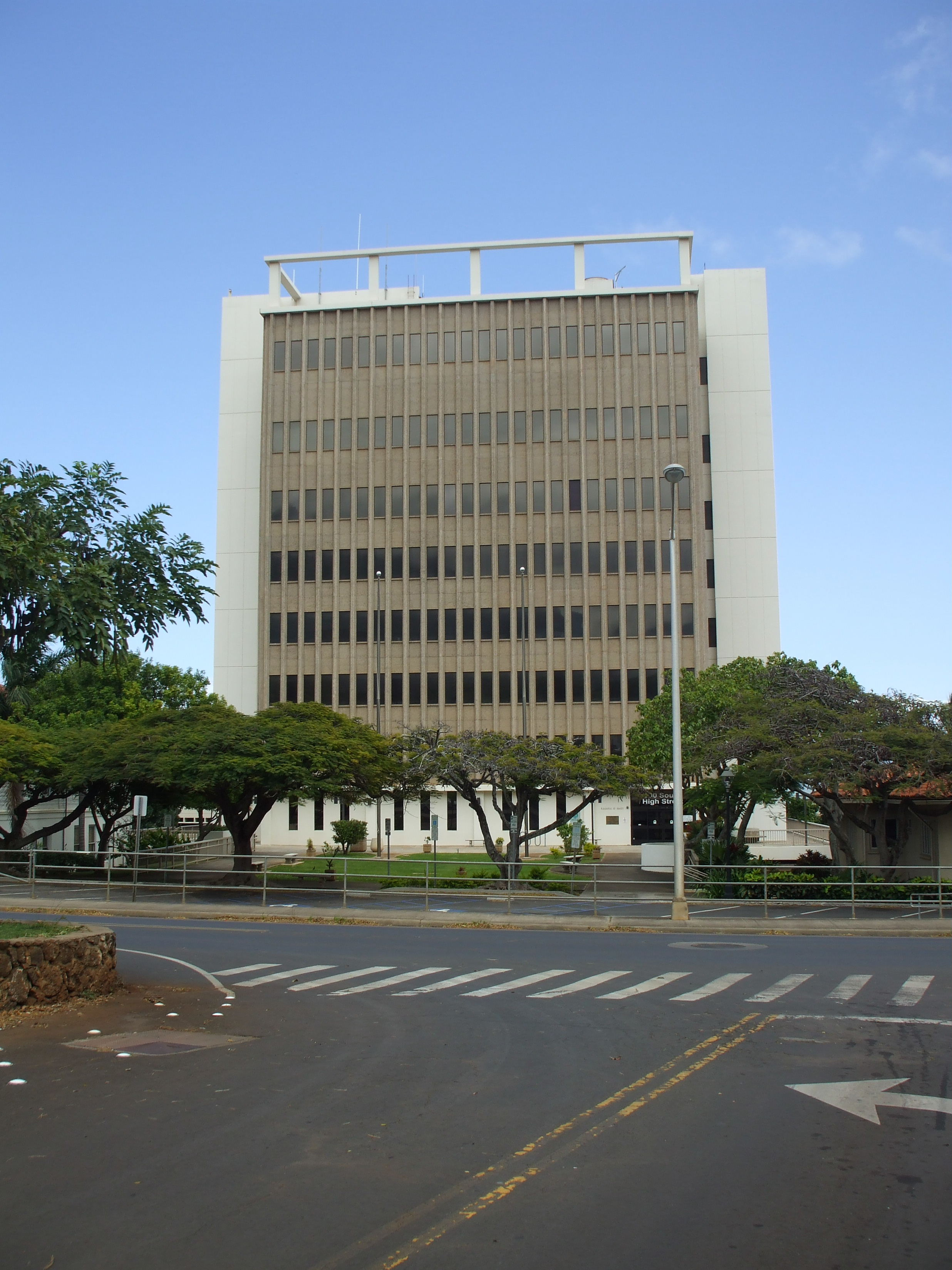
Kalana O Maui County Building, in between the Courthouse (lower left hand corner of the county building) and Kalana Pakui Building/Old Police Station (lower right hand corner of the county building).

It currently houses the Governor of Hawaii's Liaison office among other state offices.

== Kalana O Maui County Building ==
Within the historic district is the Kalana O Maui County Building of Maui, which is situated between the Courthouse and Old Police Station. The nine-story building, built in 1972, occupies a site formerly occupied by a firehouse and jail. It is listed as part of the historic district as a non-contributing property.

== Notes ==
- a. According to the NRHP nomination form: ...constructed of cast hollow concrete block which mimetically perpetuates distressed stone. Whereas the Pohaku entry states: ...was built of smooth-finished, poured-in-place concrete walls up to the second floor level and rusticated concrete blocks above.
