= Stangenwald Building =

First high-rise building in Honolulu

Coordinates: 21°18′30.5″N 157°51′45.5″W

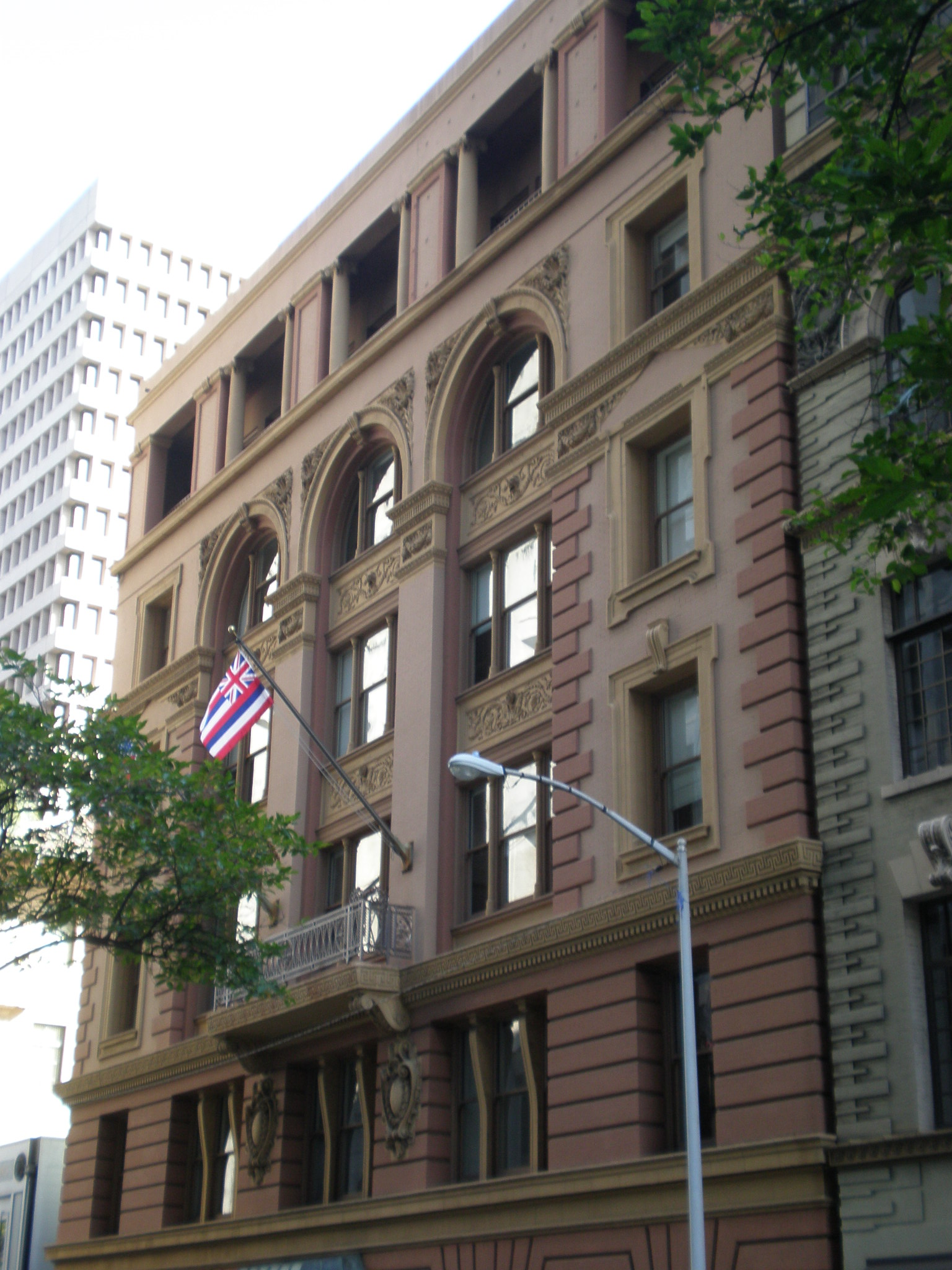
Stangenwald Building

The Stangenwald Building at 119 Merchant Street, in downtown Honolulu, Hawaii was the city's first high-rise office building, with its own law library, and one of the earliest electric elevators in the (then) Territory when it was built in 1901. It was also advertised as "fireproof" because it was built of concrete, stone, brick, and steel, with no wood except in the windows, doors, and furniture, and because it had fireproof vaults and firehoses on every floor. Fireproofing was an important selling point because of the fire that had devastated nearby Chinatown the previous year.) Apart from a few exceptional structures like Aloha Tower (1926) and Honolulu Hale (1929), it remained the tallest building in Honolulu for half a century, until the building boom of the 1950s.

Young local architect C.W. Dickey designed it with features of Italianate architecture: arched windows, terra cotta ornaments, and a wide balcony with fine grillwork above the entrance. Every floor had a unique exterior. The interior vestibule and hall were decorated with mosaic tile floors and marble panelling, while the stairways had slate and marble steps. In 1980, another local architect, James K. Tsugawa, completed an award-winning restoration.

Dr. Hugo Stangenwald (1829–1899) was an Austrian physician and pioneer photographer who arrived in Honolulu in 1853. In 1869, he bought the 5,303-square-foot (492.7 m^{2}) property and built his medical offices there, in partnership with Dr. Gerrit P. Judd next door. Not long before he died, he leased the land to a group who planned a fine structure to match the quality of the Judd Building (1898) next door, designed by Oliver G. Traphagen, who had just arrived from Duluth, Minnesota.
