= Charles W. Dickey =

American architect (1871–1942)

Charles William “C.W.” Dickey (6 July 1871 – 25 April 1942) was an American architect famous for developing a distinctive style of Hawaiian architecture, including the double-pitched Dickey roof. He was known not only for designing some of the most famous buildings in Hawaiʻi—such as the Alexander & Baldwin Building, Halekulani Hotel, Kamehameha Schools campus buildings—but also for influencing a cadre of notable successors, including Hart Wood, Cyril Lemmon, Douglas Freeth, Roy Kelley, and Vladimir Ossipoff.

== Biography ==
Dickey was born in Alameda, California. His maternal grandfather, William P. Alexander, was an early missionary to Hawaii. His mother was Anne Alexander (1843–1940), whose brother Samuel Thomas Alexander founded Alexander & Baldwin with Henry Perrine Baldwin who was married to his aunt Emily Alexander. His father was Charles Henry Dickey (1841–1932). He grew up in Haʻikū on Maui, but he returned to California for schooling. After finishing high school in Oakland, California, he obtained a B.A. in architecture from the Massachusetts Institute of Technology in 1894, then worked with Clinton Briggs Ripley (1896–1900) and E.A.P. Newcomb (1901–1905) in Honolulu, Hawaii, before returning to open his own firm in Oakland. He died in Honolulu, Hawaiʻi

== Work ==
His initial designs in Hawaiʻi were eclectic. Influences of the then popular Richardsonian Romanesque style can be seen in Punahou School's Pauahi Hall (1894–96), the Bishop Estate Building on Merchant Street (1896), the Irwin Block (Nippu Jiji building) on Nuuanu Street (1896), and Progress Block on Fort Street (1897) in Downtown Honolulu, the last now occupied by Hawaii Pacific University. One of his finest early designs was the Italianate Stangenwald Building (1901) on Merchant Street. Many of these are contributing properties to the Merchant Street Historic District.

Even while in Oakland, Dickey continued to design for clients in Hawaiʻi. Dickey’s California firm designed the plantation office building for the Hawaiian Commercial and Sugar Company (HC&S) at Puunene, Maui in 1917 (and his Honolulu firm designed renovations to the building ten years later). HC&S, a division of Alexander & Baldwin, Inc., was the last remaining sugar plantation in Hawaii when it closed in 2016. In 1920, he reopened an office in Honolulu, in partnership with Hart Wood, and then returned for good in 1925. This time he felt a stronger need to adapt his buildings to the local environment, declaring in 1926: "Hawaiian architecture is a type distinctive to itself and Mediterranean styles must be adapted to fit local conditions before they are at all suited to the islands." He favored larger open spaces and fewer walls, to allow the tradewinds to circulate, and roofs with projecting eaves in order to keep rain out without having to close the windows.

The shape of the roof and the projecting eaves became such a Dickey trademark that it became known locally as the "Dickey roof": a hip roof with a "double-pitch", that is, a shallower pitch at the eaves, as can be seen on the house he constructed in 1926. So many other architects have adapted this roof style over the years that it has now become a stereotypical feature of a "Hawaiian sense of place."

During the 1920s, Dickey designed guest cottages in Waikiki for the Halekulani Hotel that attempted to replicate the charm of Hawaiian grass houses. In 1930, he completed the hotel's Honeymoon Cottage, and in 1931 its main building. In 1931, he designed the Immigration Station (construction completed in 1934) at Honolulu Harbor while a young architect from California and new to Honolulu, Val Ossipoff, was working for Dickey. He designed the Waikiki Theatre in 1936. In 1940, he designed another new hotel at the edge of the Kīlauea volcano for Greek businessman George Lycurgus called the Volcano House.

== Gallery ==
Dickey designs on National Register of Historic Places

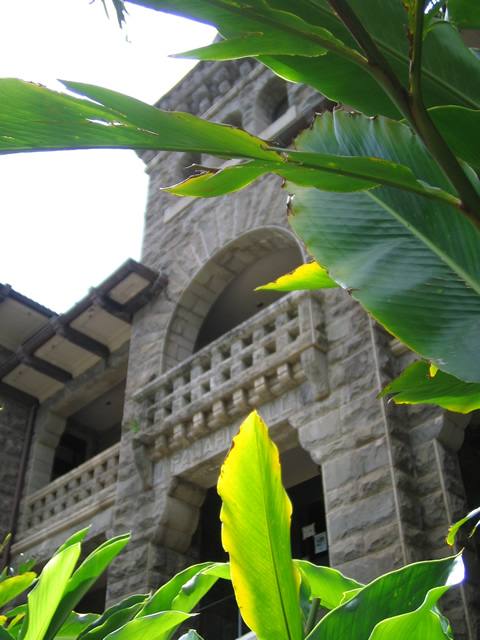
Pauahi Hall, 1894–96

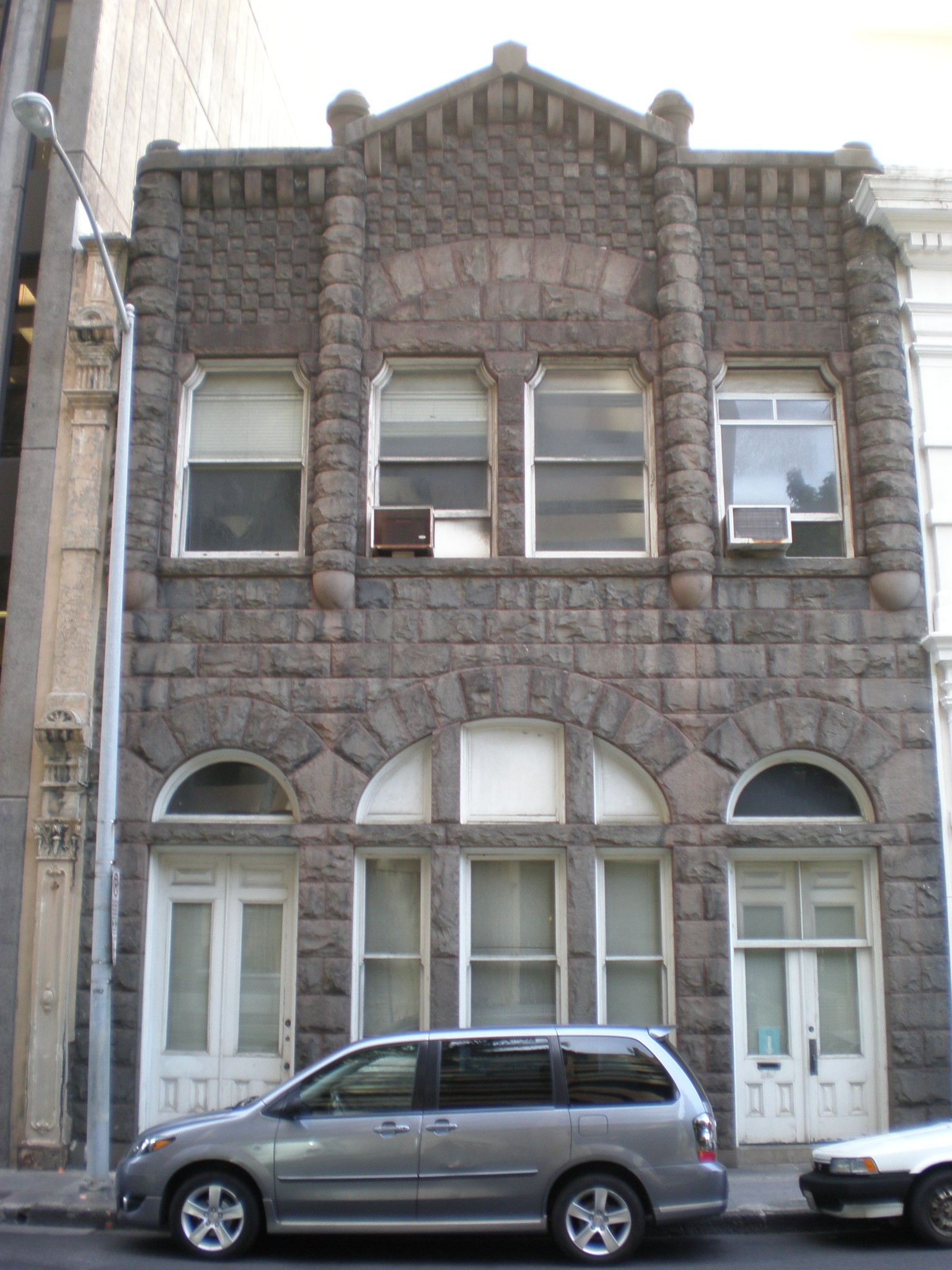
Bishop Estate Building, 1896 (with Ripley)

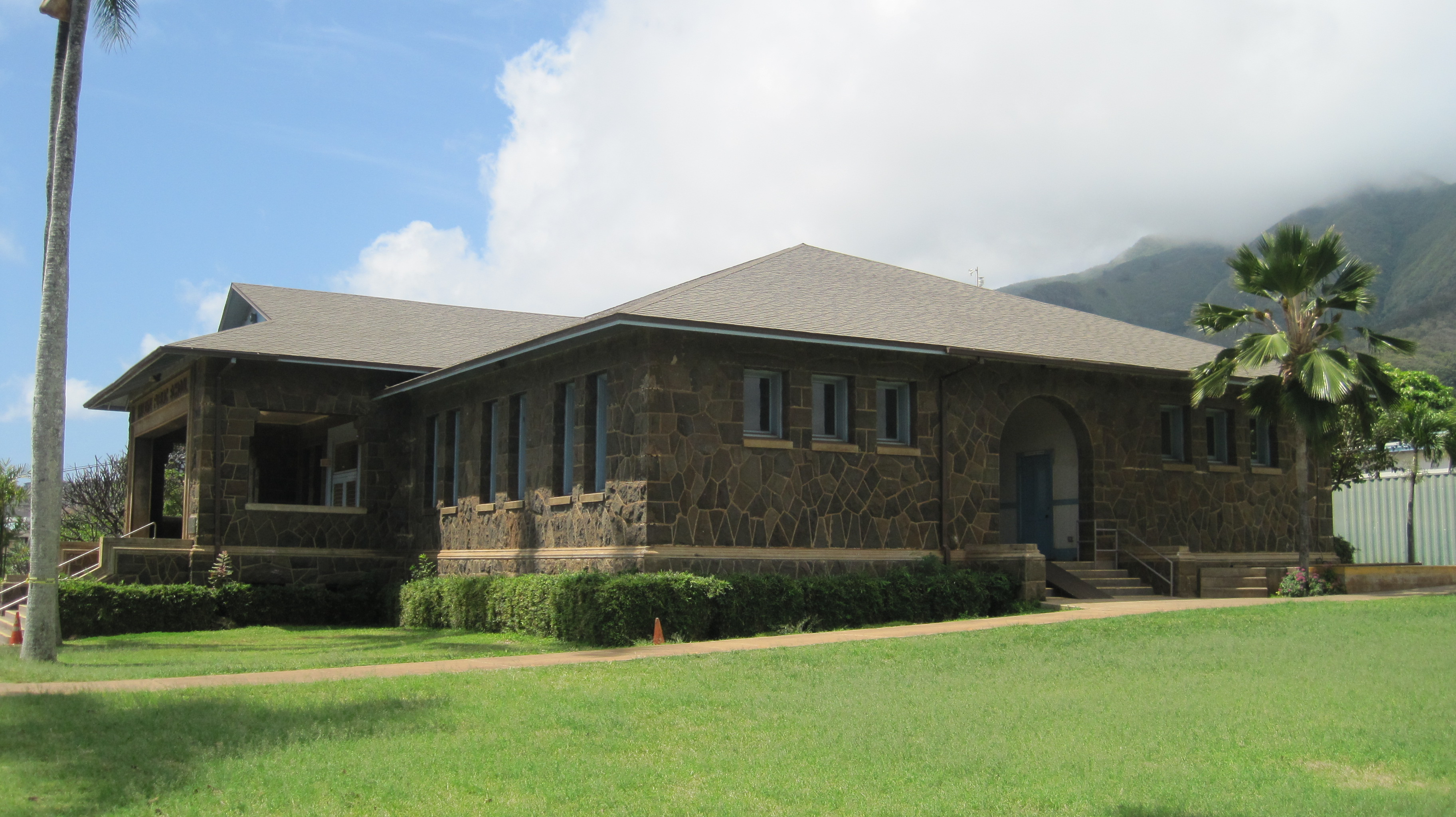
Wailuku School, 1904 (with Newcomb)

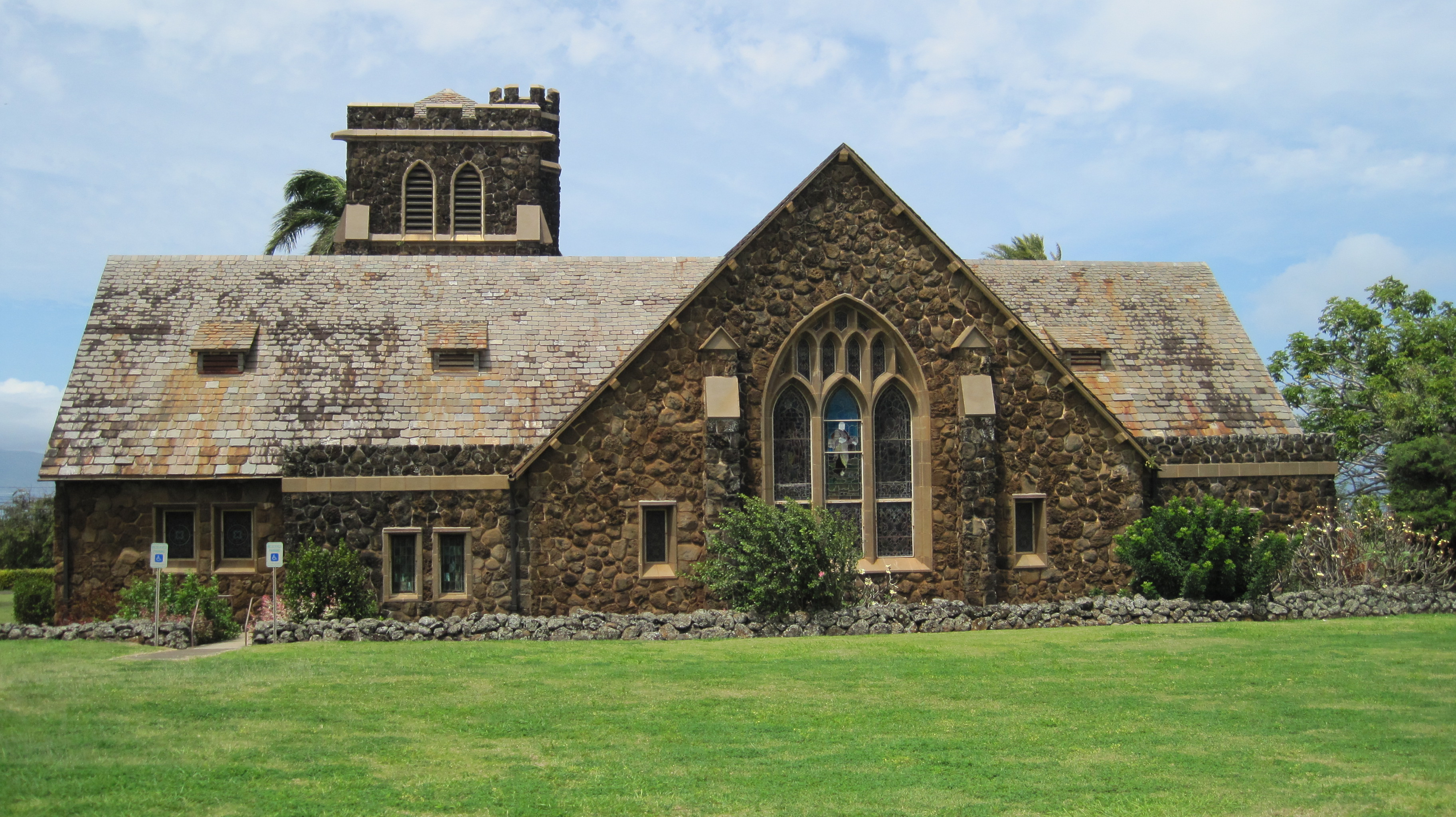
Makawao Union Church, Maui, 1916

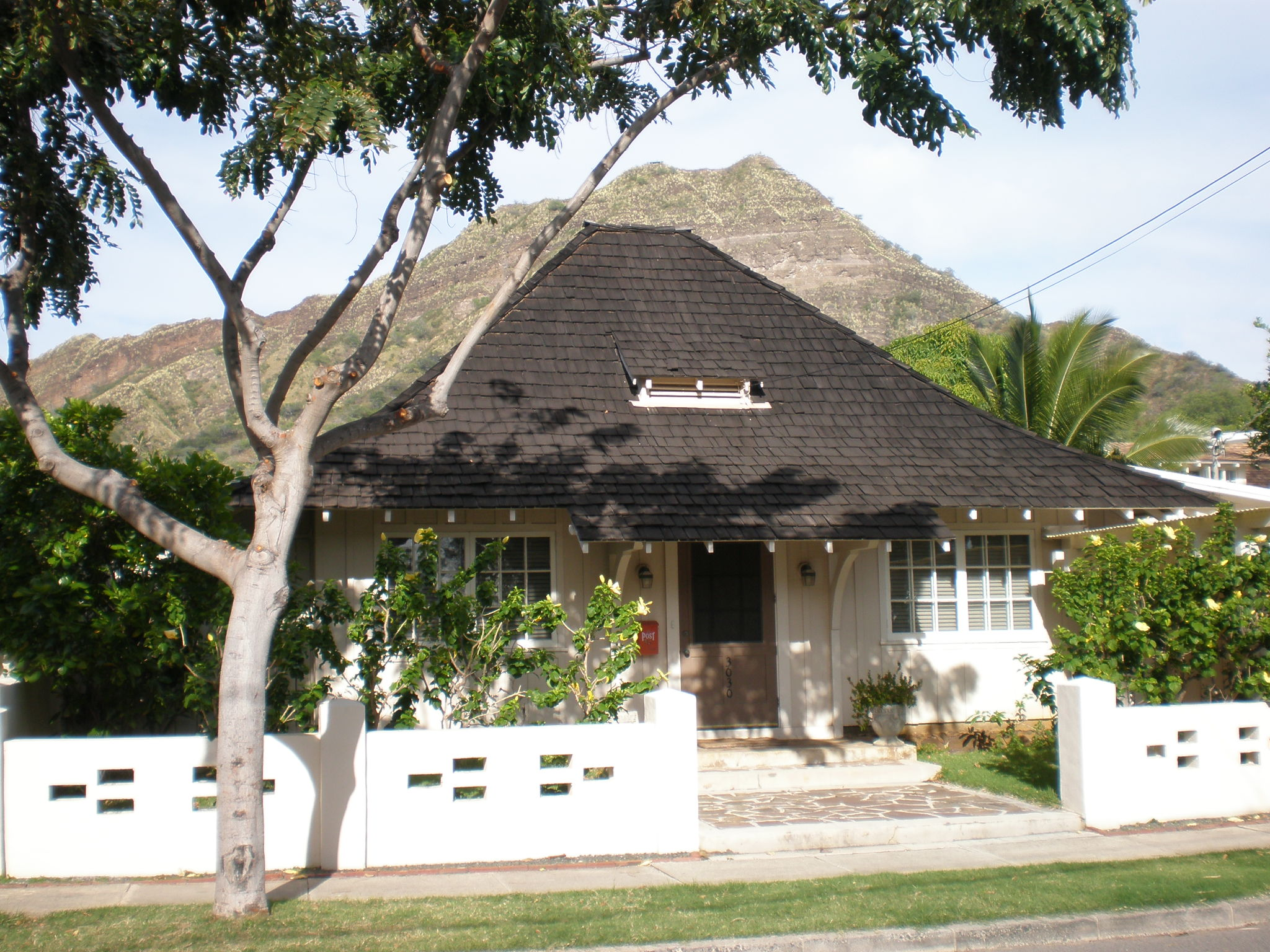
C.W. Dickey House, 1926

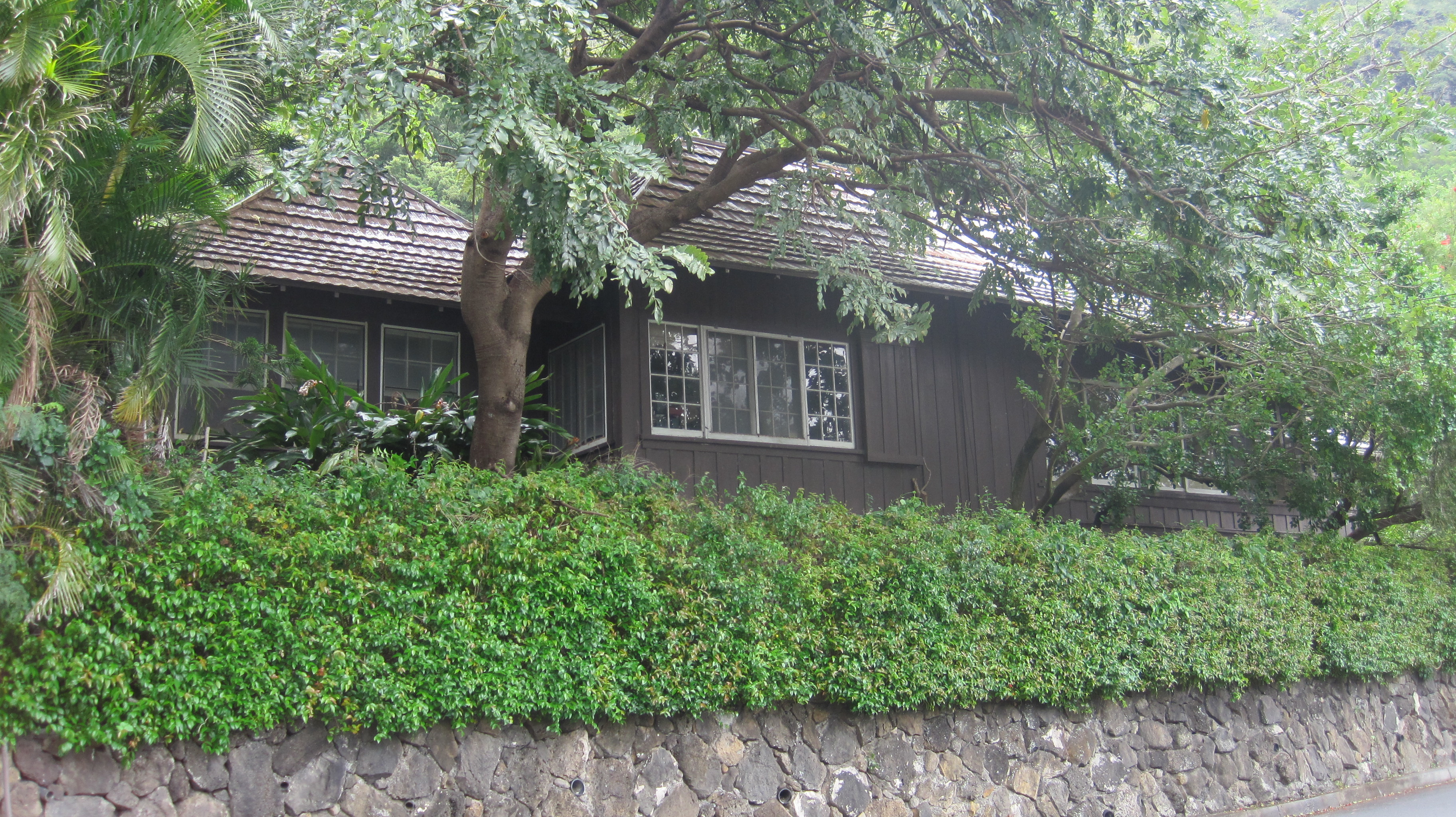
Jessie Eyman–Wilma Judson House, 1926

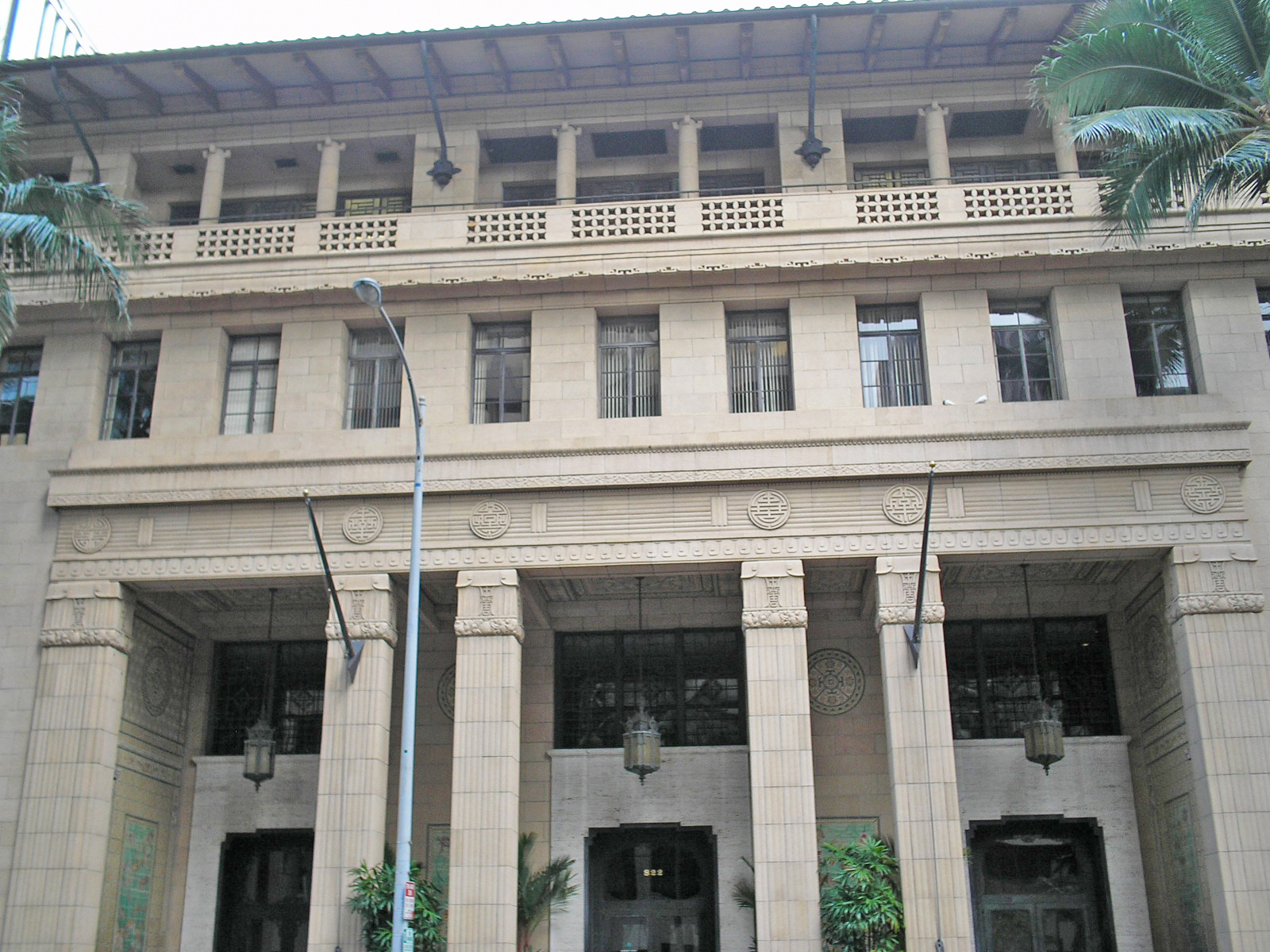
Alexander & Baldwin Building, 1926-29 (with Wood)

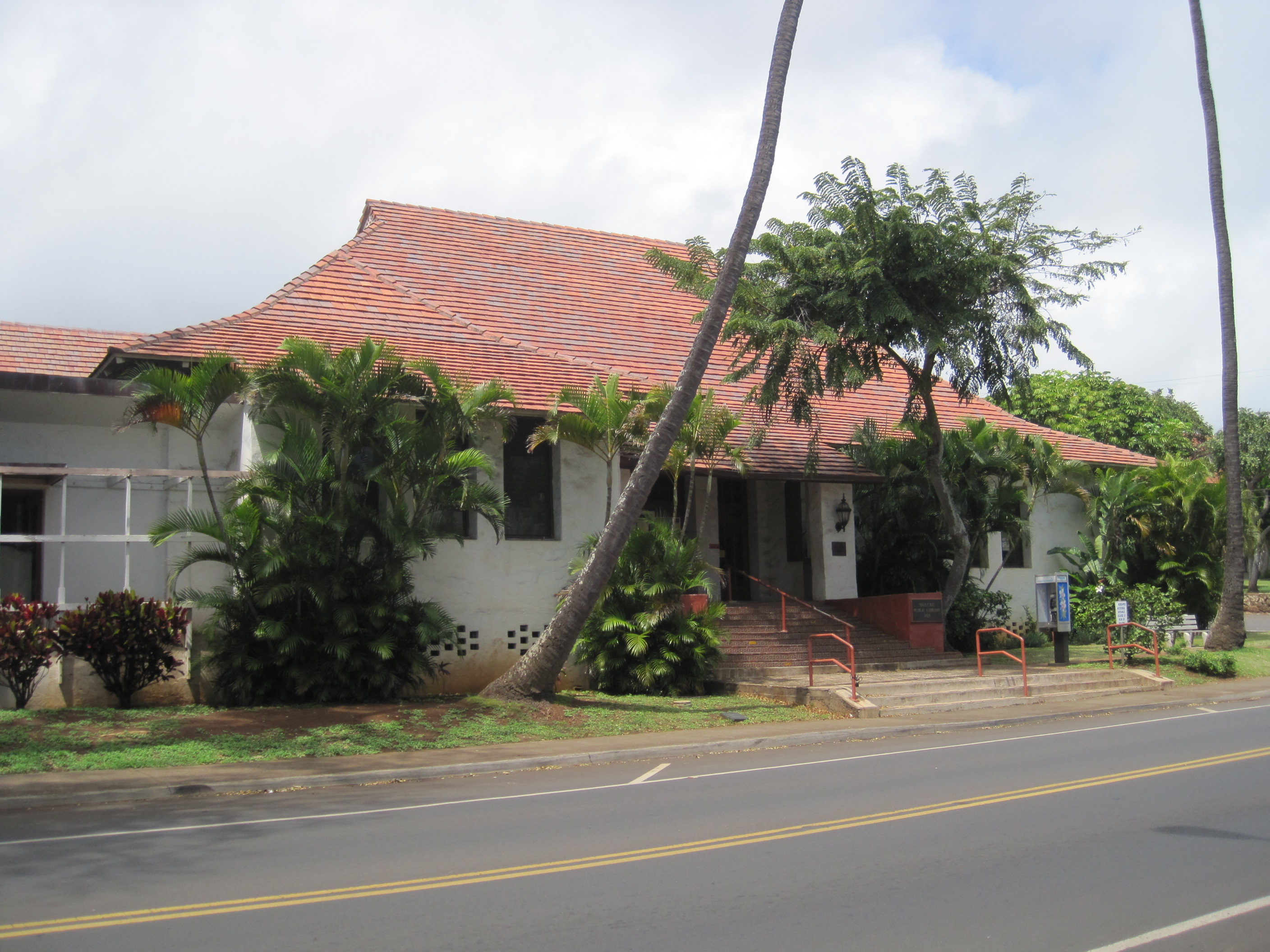
Wailuku Library, Maui, 1928

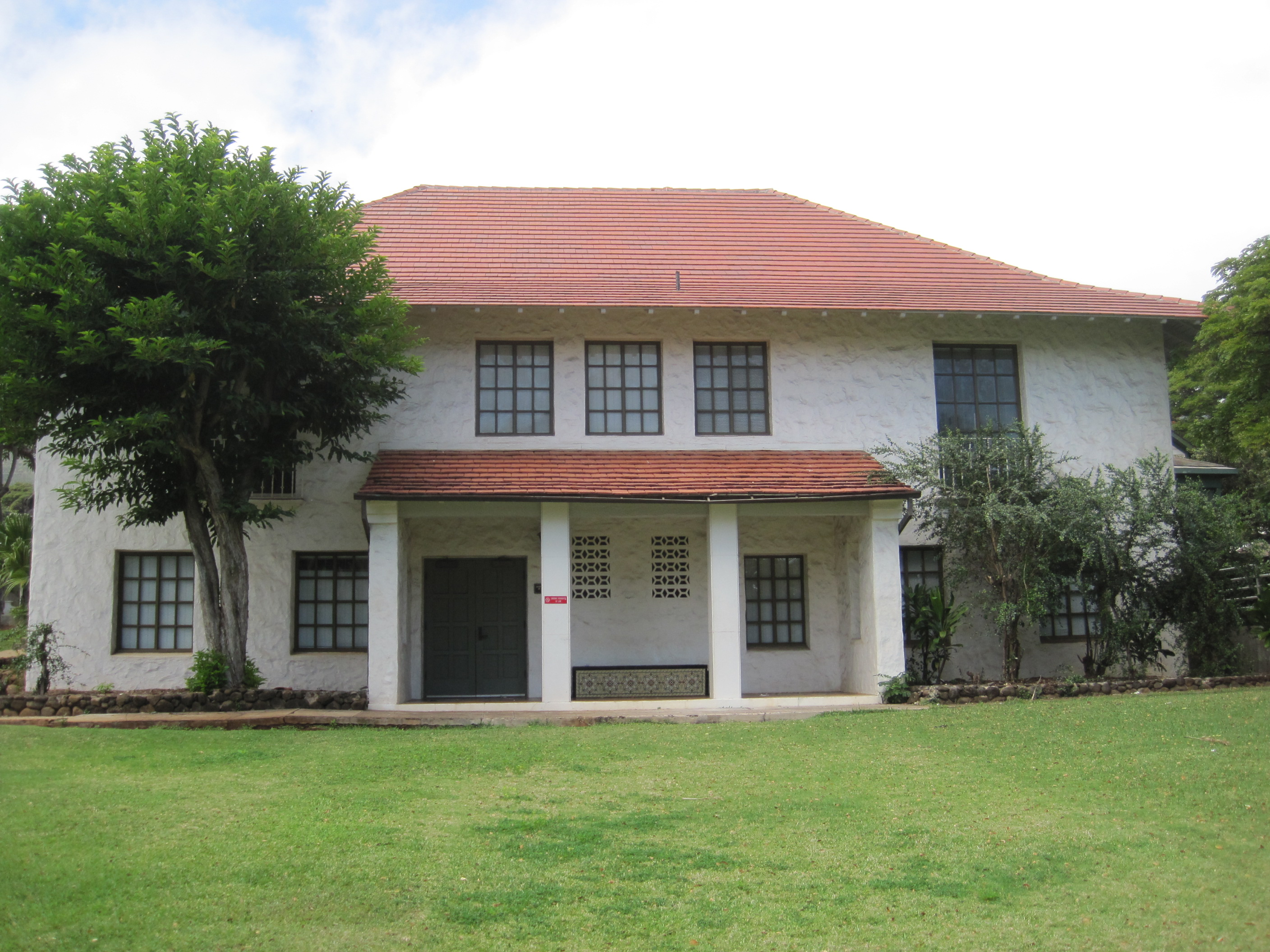
Territorial Office Building, Wailuku, 1931

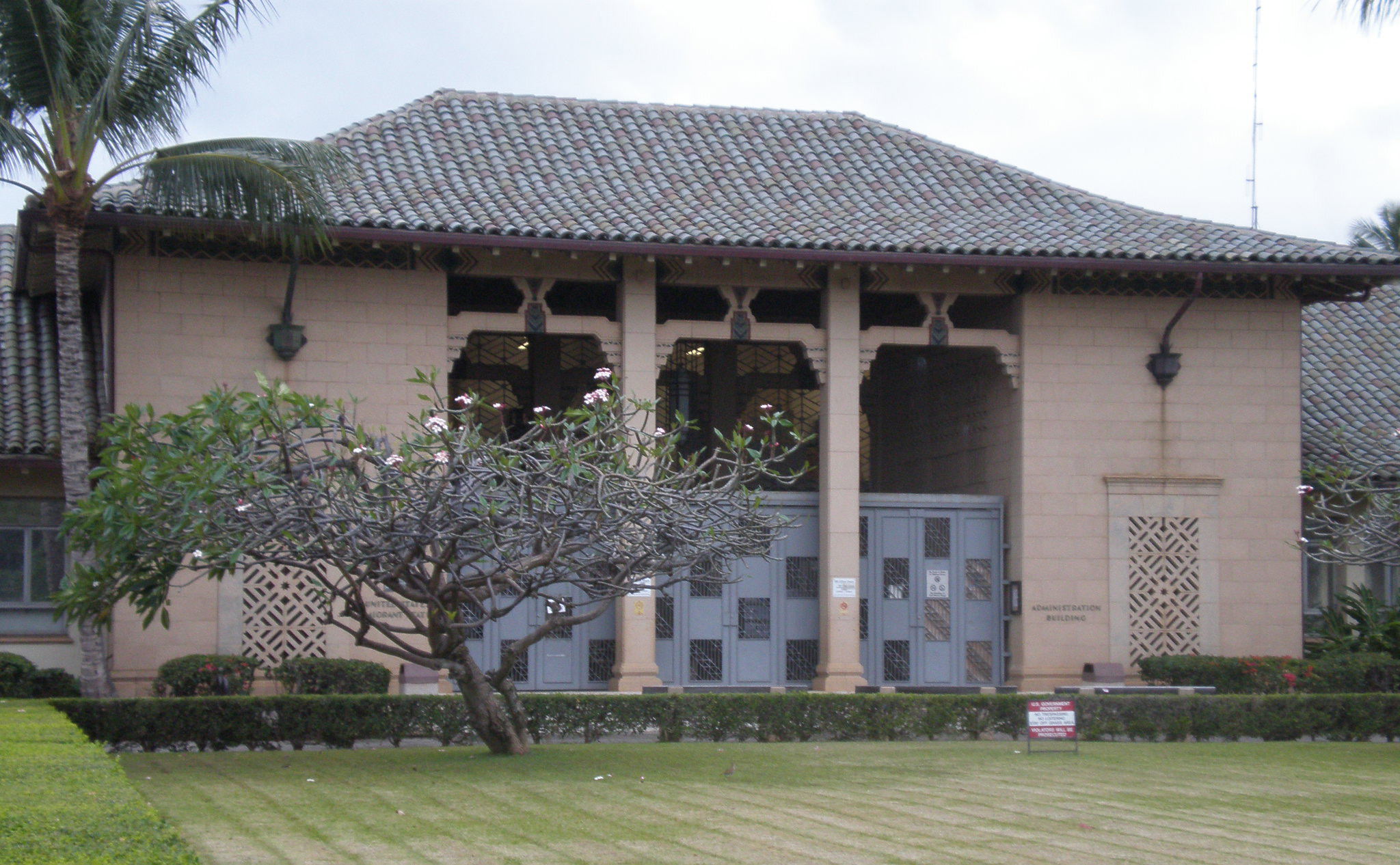
U.S. Immigration Office, 1931

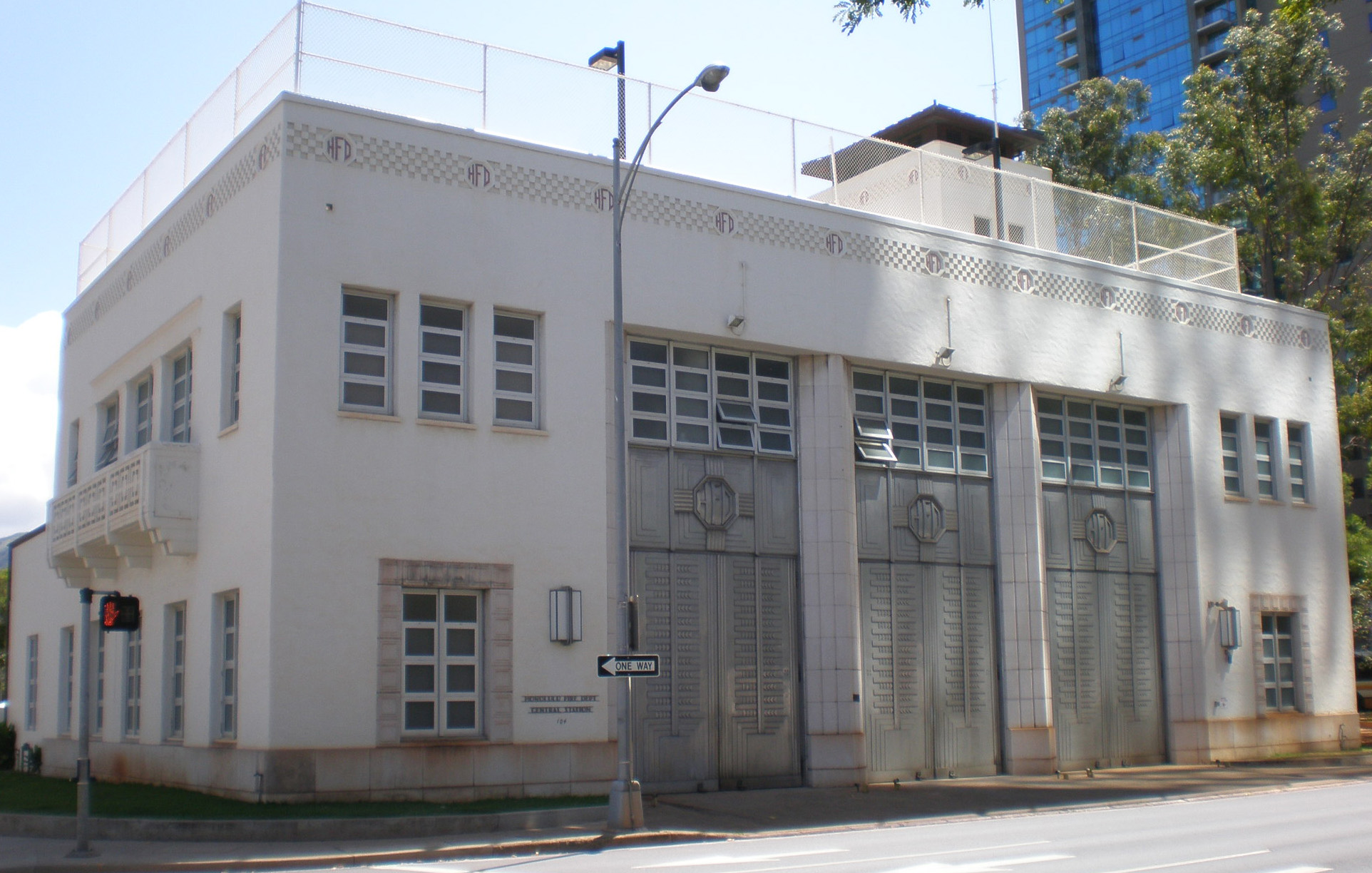
Central Fire Station, 1934

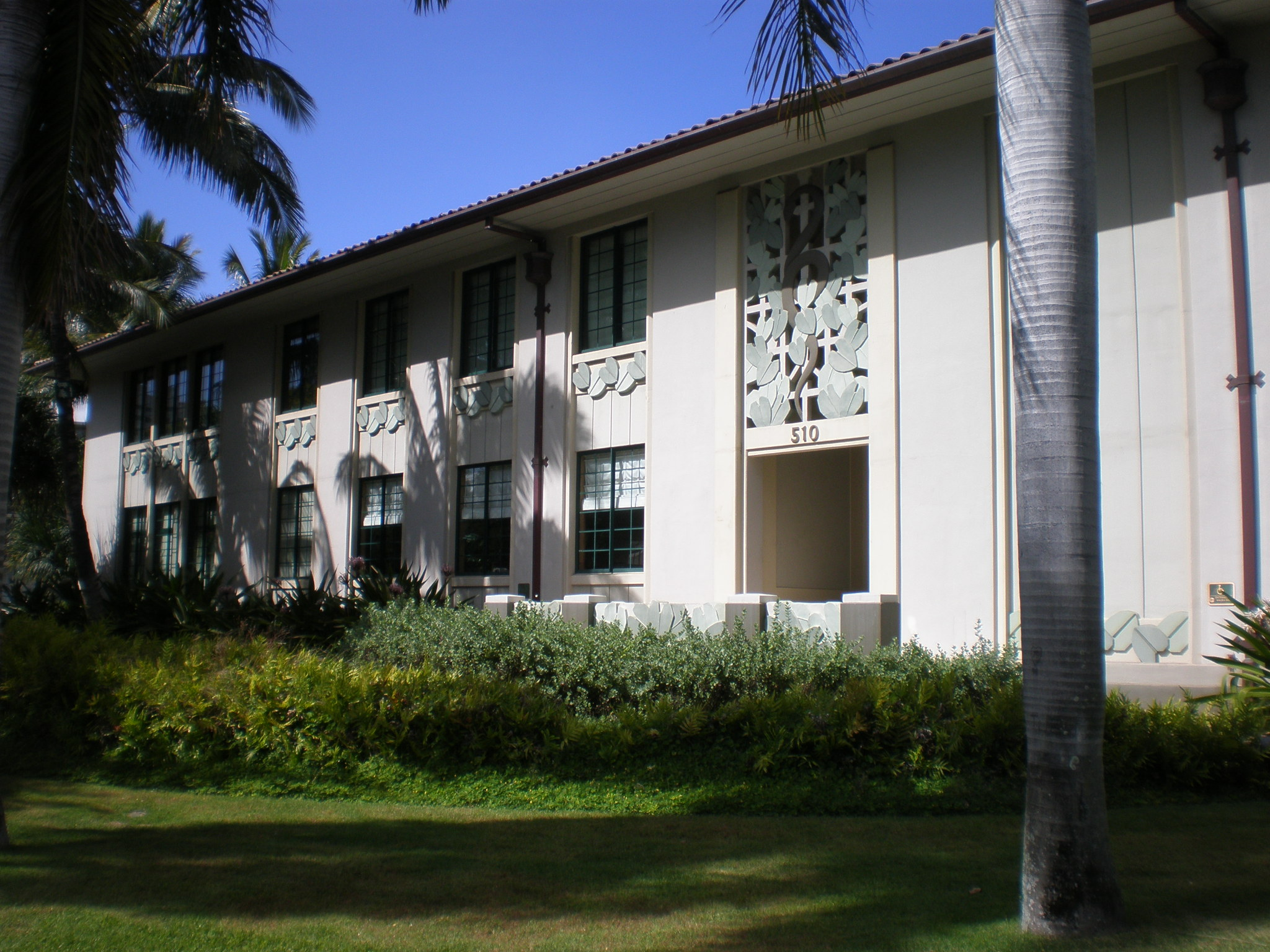
Mabel Smyth Memorial Building, 1941
Other Dickey designs

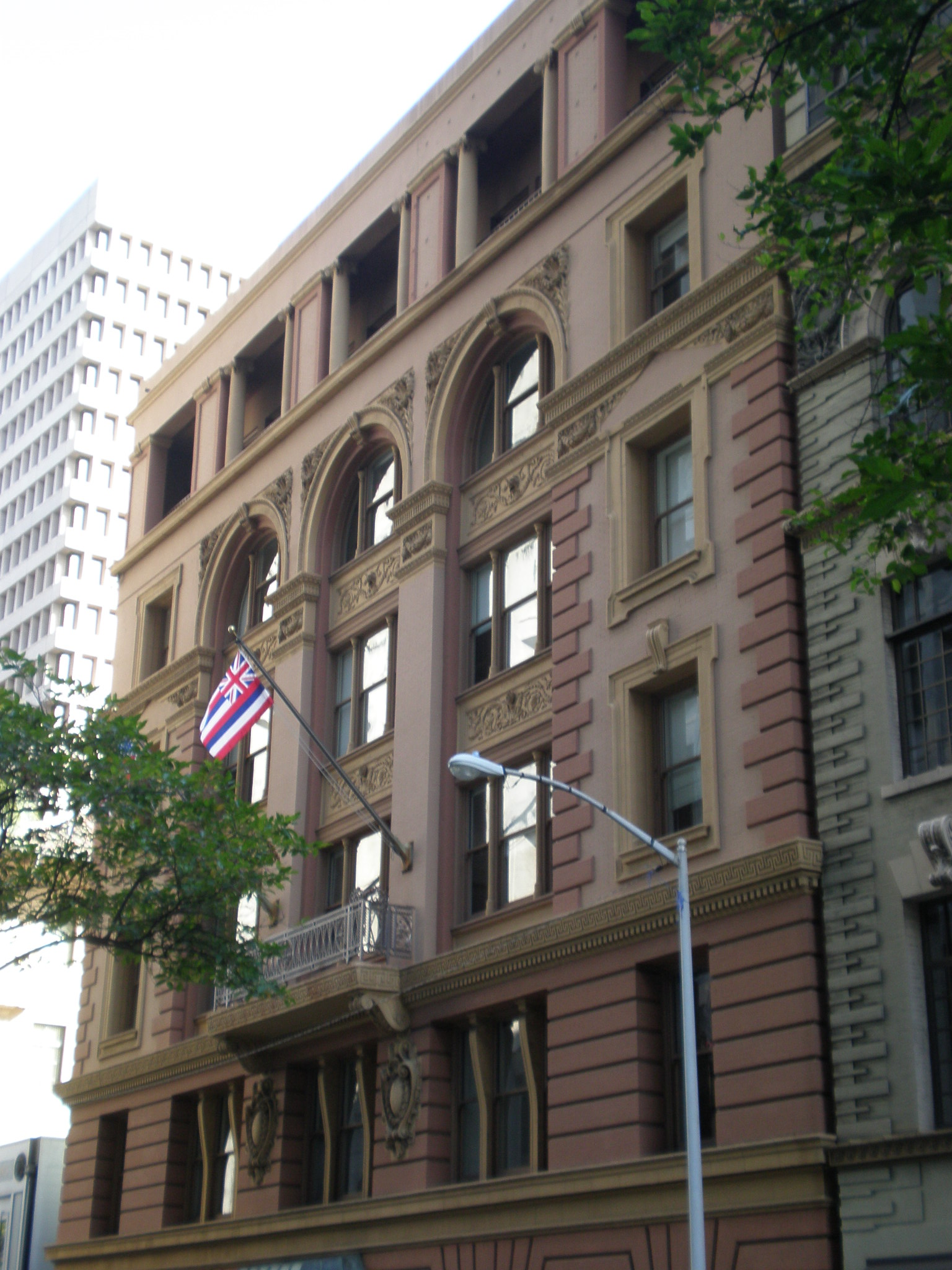
Stangenwald Building, 1901

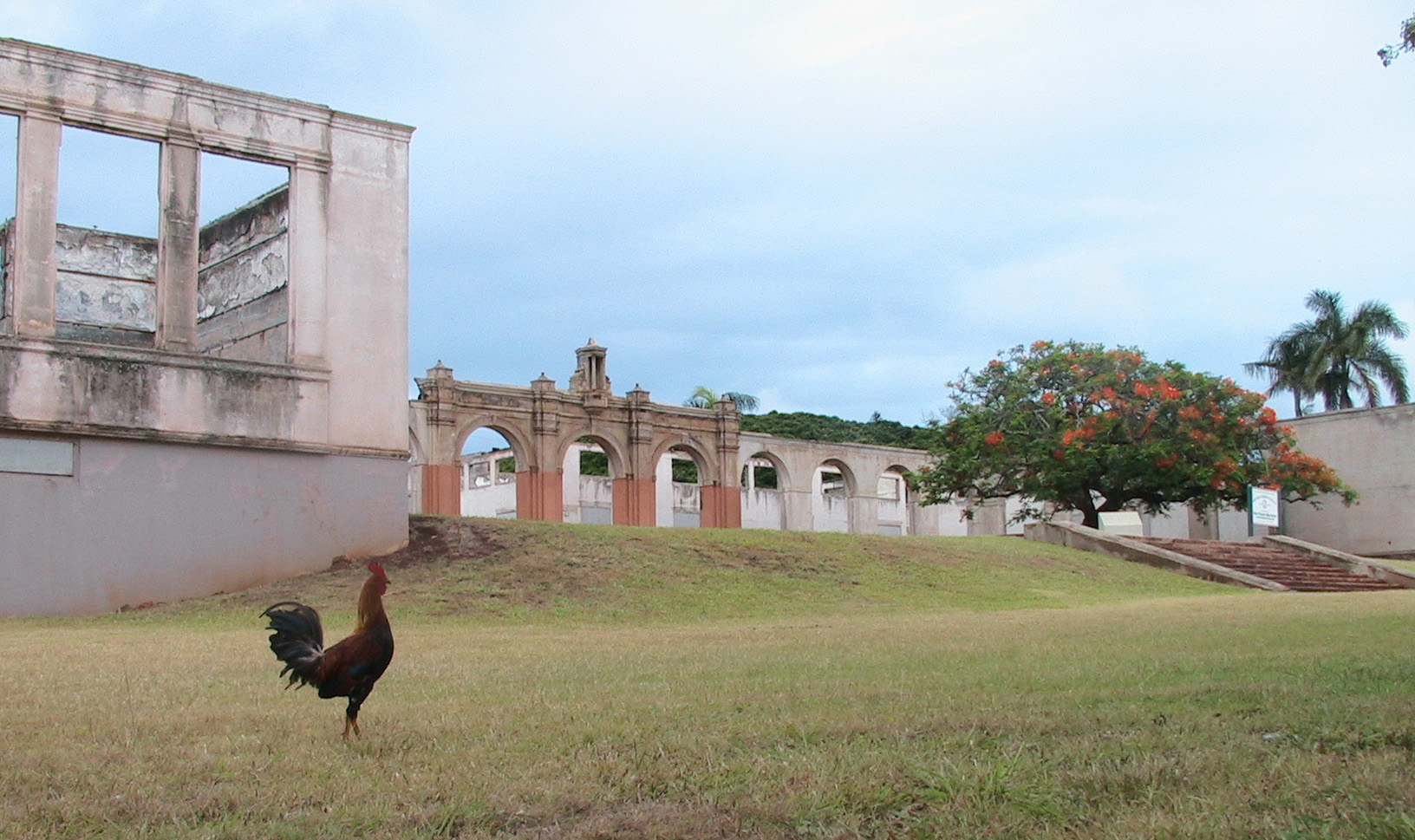
Old Maui High School (ruins), 1921

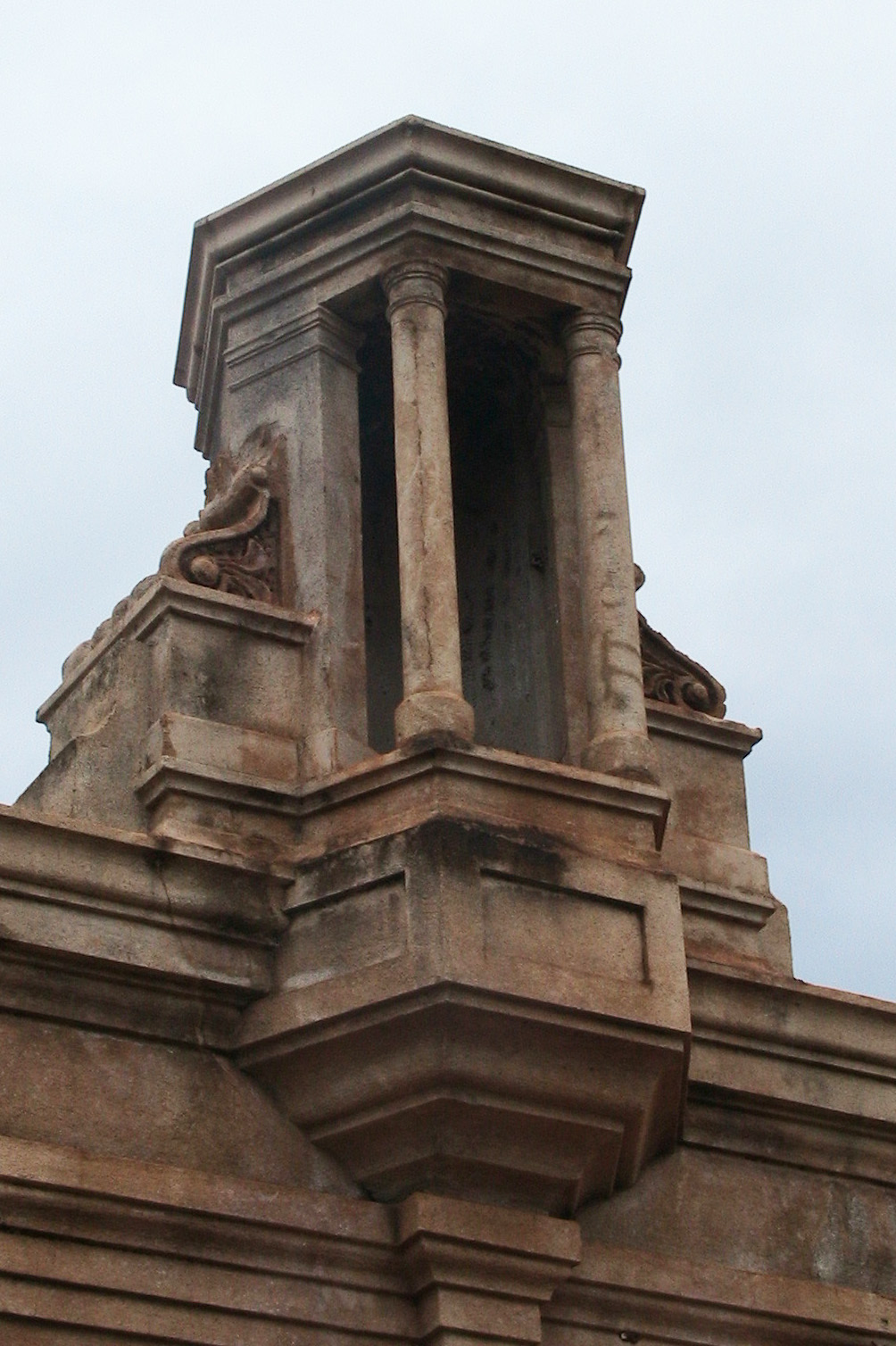
Detail of Old Maui High School façade

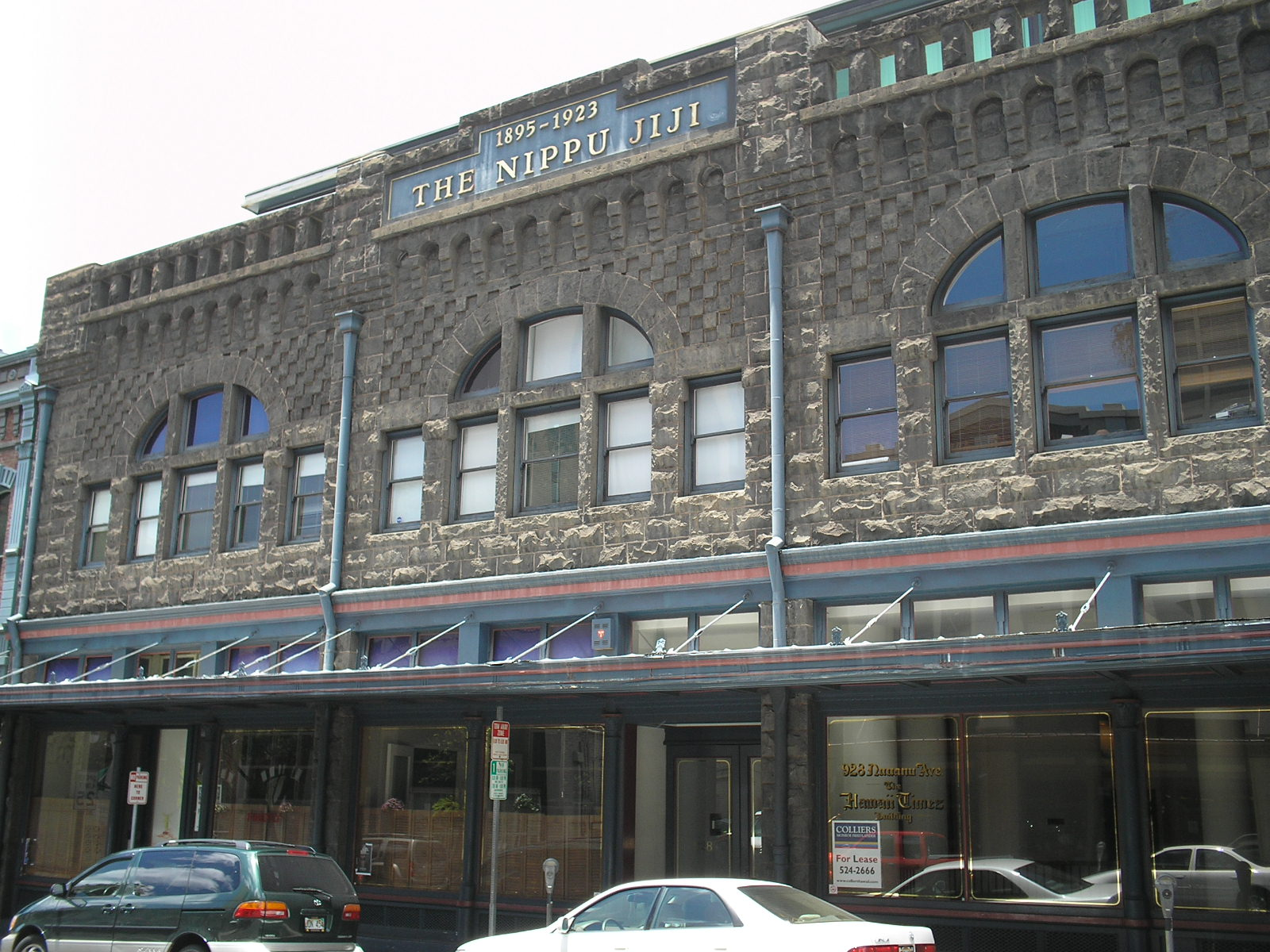
Irwin Block, 1897 (with Ripley); bought by Nippu Jiji (1895-1985) in 1923

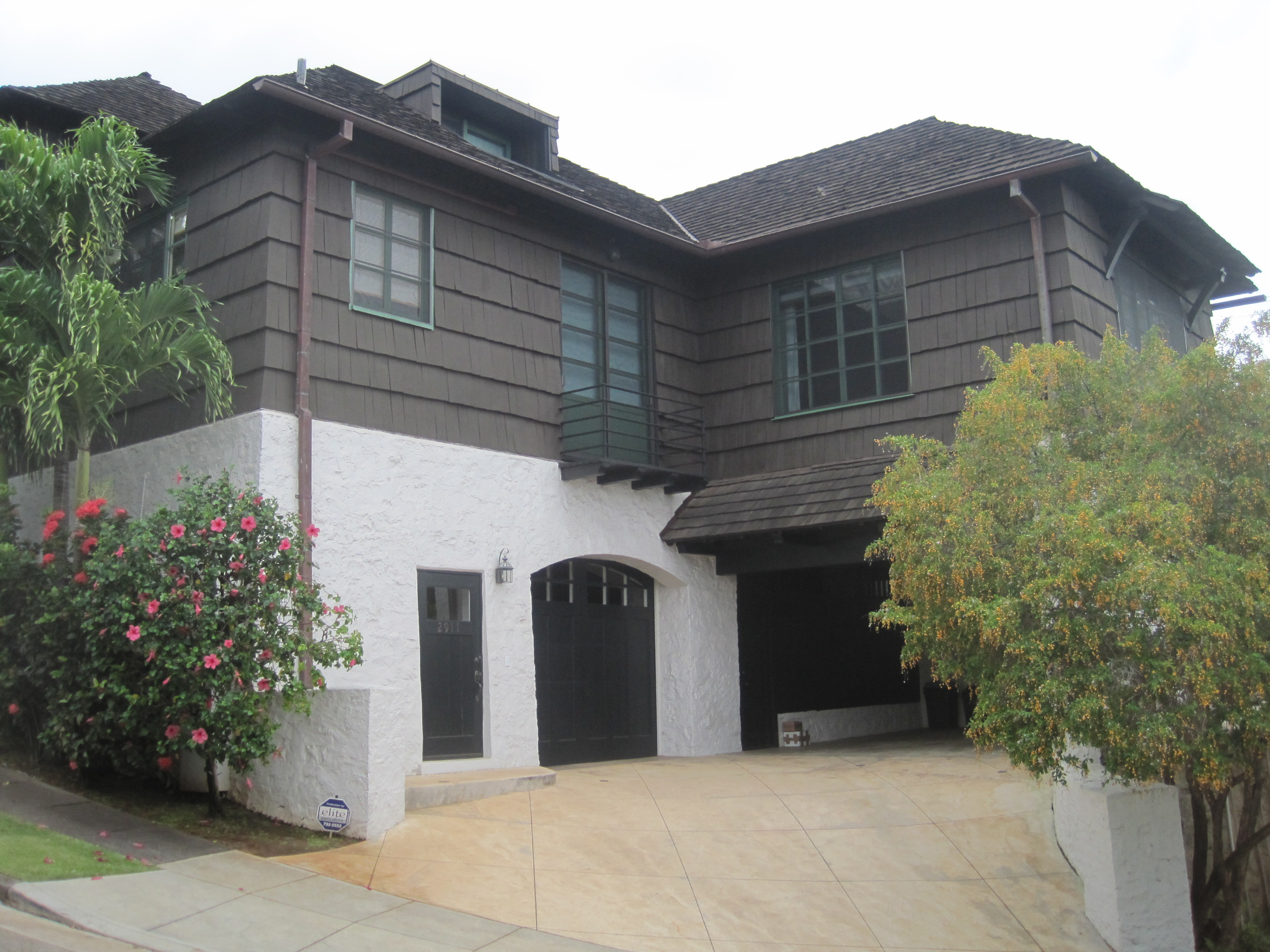
Dickey's home, 2911 Makalei Place, 1932

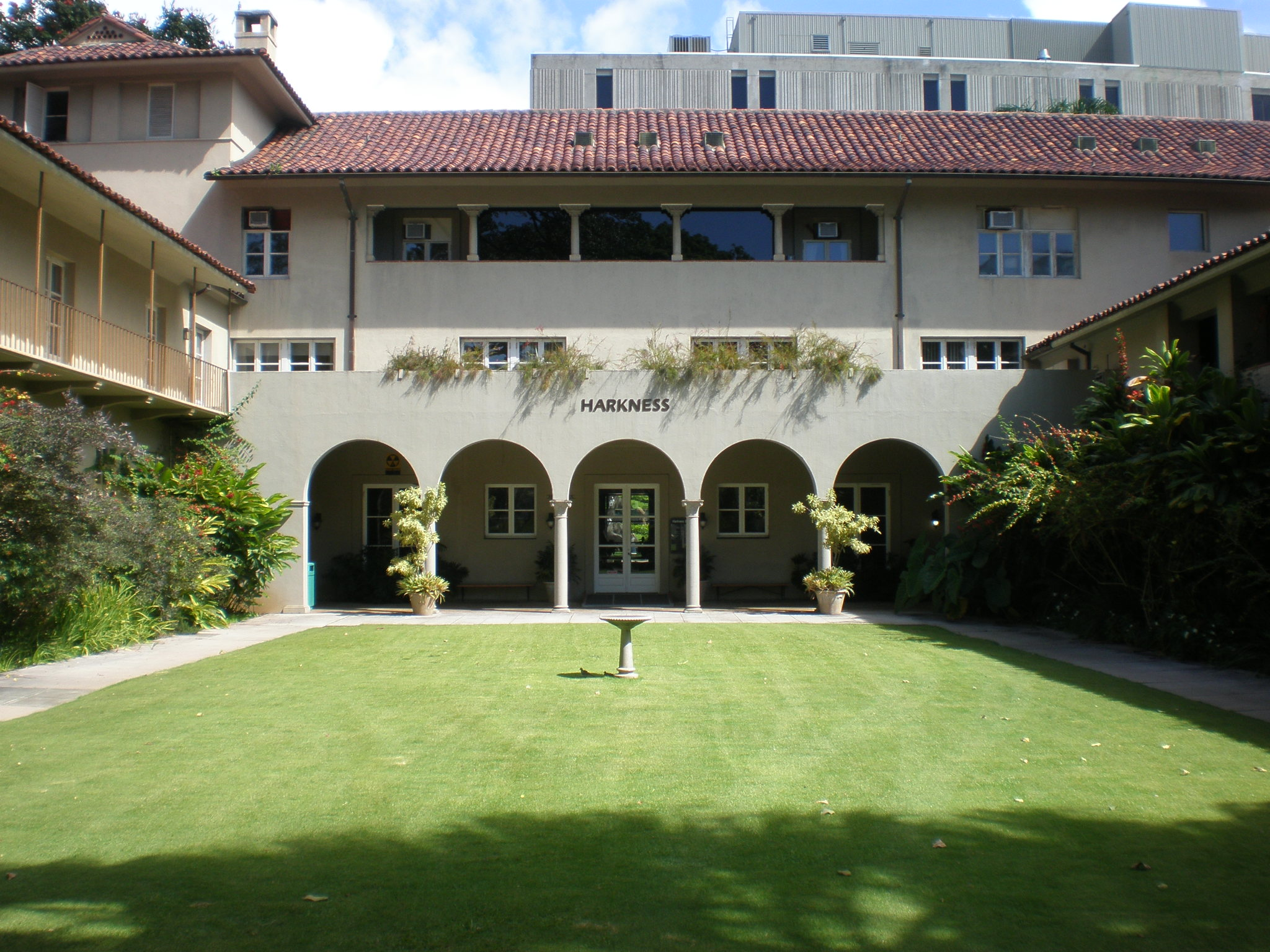
Harkness Nurses Home, Queen's Medical Center, 1932

== Family tree ==
Alexander & Baldwin family tree

William P. Alexander (1805–1884)	Mary Ann McKinney (1810–1888)	Amos Starr Cooke (1810–1871)	Juliette Montague (1812–1896)	Dwight Baldwin (1798–1886)	Charlotte Fowler (1805–1873)	J. W. Smith (1810–1887
David Dwight Baldwin (1831–1912)	W. O. Smith (1848–1929)
William D. Alexander (1833–1913)	Abigail Baldwin (1847–1912)	Samuel T. Alexander (1836–1904)	Martha Eliza Cooke	Ann Elizabeth Alexander (1843–1940)	Henry P. Baldwin (1842–1911)	Emily Whitney Alexander (1846–1943)
Agnes Alexander (1875–1971)	Annie Montague Alexander (1867–1950)	C.W. Dickey (1871–1942)	Belle Dickey (1880–1972)	James Dole (1877–1958)	Henry Alexander Baldwin (1871–1946)	Ethel Frances Smith (1879–1967)
J. Walter Cameron (1895–1976)	Francis Baldwin (1904–1996)
Colin C. Cameron (1927–1992) (Kapalua)
