= United States Immigration Office (Honolulu) =

- U.S. Immigration Office
- U.S. National Register of Historic Places
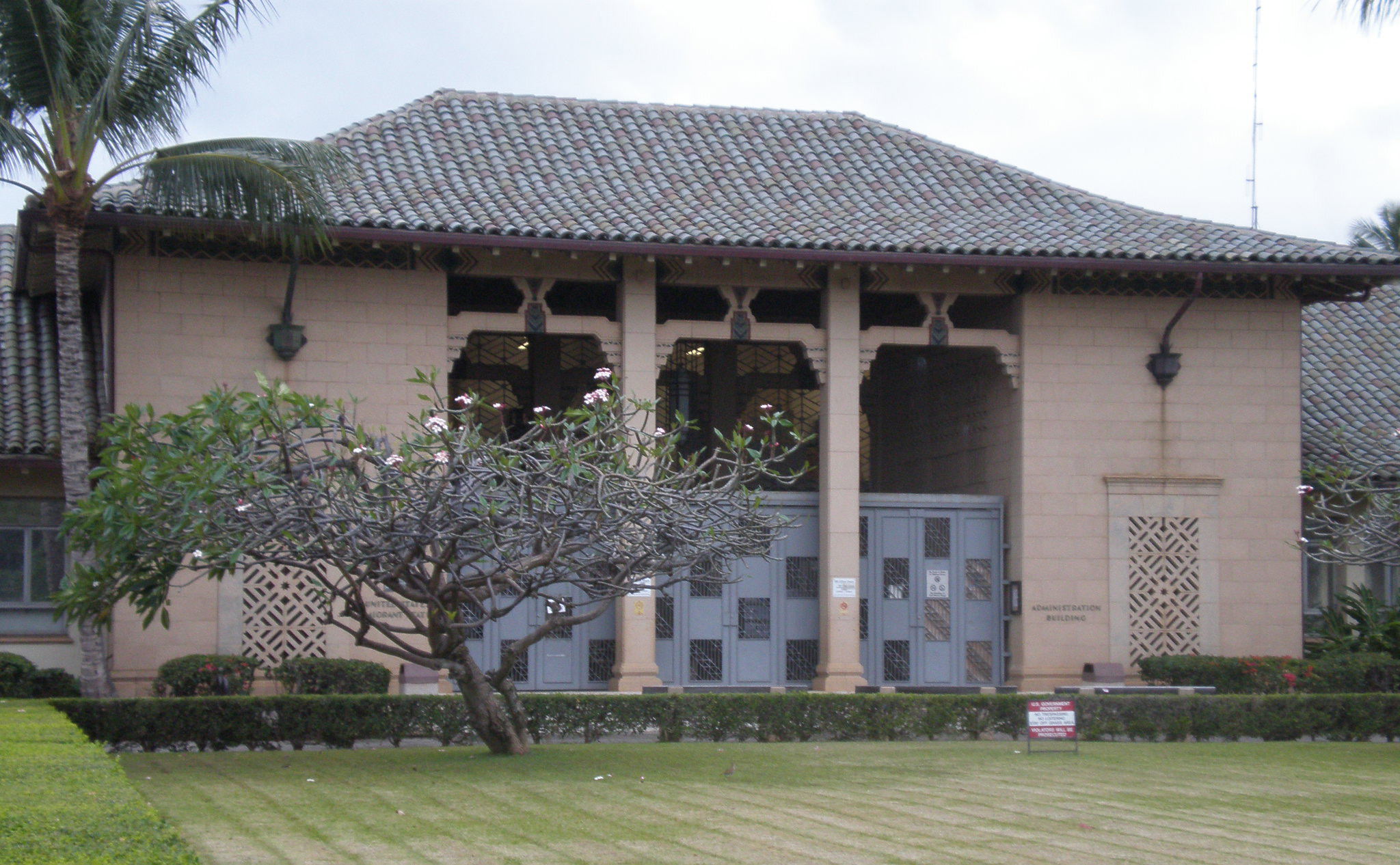
- Main building

- Location within Hawaii
- Location: 595 Ala Moana Blvd., Honolulu, Hawaii
- Coordinates: 21°17′59″N 157°51′50″W
- Built: 1934
- Architects: Dickey, C.W.; Cayton, Herbert C.
- NRHP reference No.: 73000664
- Added to NRHP: August 14, 1973

The U.S. Immigration Office in Honolulu, Hawaii was constructed in 1934 based on a design by C.W. Dickey and Herbert C. Cayton. It was listed on the National Register of Historic Places in 1973.

Dickey was raised on Maui and became the acknowledged master of what became known as the "territorial style" of Hawaiian architecture. He had earlier designed the Alexander & Baldwin Building in downtown Honolulu, but felt that the somewhat similar design of the Immigration building "summed up his work." Similar renditions of the tiled, double-pitched, hipped "Dickey roof" with wide eaves can be found all over the islands, especially after its revival on many new buildings during the 1980s and 1990s. Other elements of the Dickey style include balanced proportions, open areas designed to provide natural light and ventilation, and decorative details such as the inlaid compass on the waiting room floor and floral patterns on the terra cotta ceiling tiles.

The site was a reception center for aliens arriving by ships during the various waves of immigration of laborers to the islands. The site is also recognized for the central role it had as a processing and internment site during World War II. The Honouliuli Internment Camp, near Ewa and Waipahu, is the other site on the island of Oahu that has met the criteria for national significance. The site contained an office building and apartments for the employees of the U.S. Immigration and Naturalization Service and their families.

Owned and managed by the General Services Administration, the complex must be returned to state control if declared surplus by the federal government. As of 2014, the building houses Homeland Security Investigations, a branch of U.S. Immigration and Customs Enforcement in the Department of Homeland Security and the State of Hawai‘i Department of Health.

A special resource study and environmental assessment released by the National Park Service in August 2015 determined that the Honouliuli Internment Camp historic site is a feasible addition to the national park system conditional upon securing public access to the site. However, the U.S. Immigration Station complex is not a feasible addition because the complex is currently used by the aforementioned governmental departments.

== Gallery ==
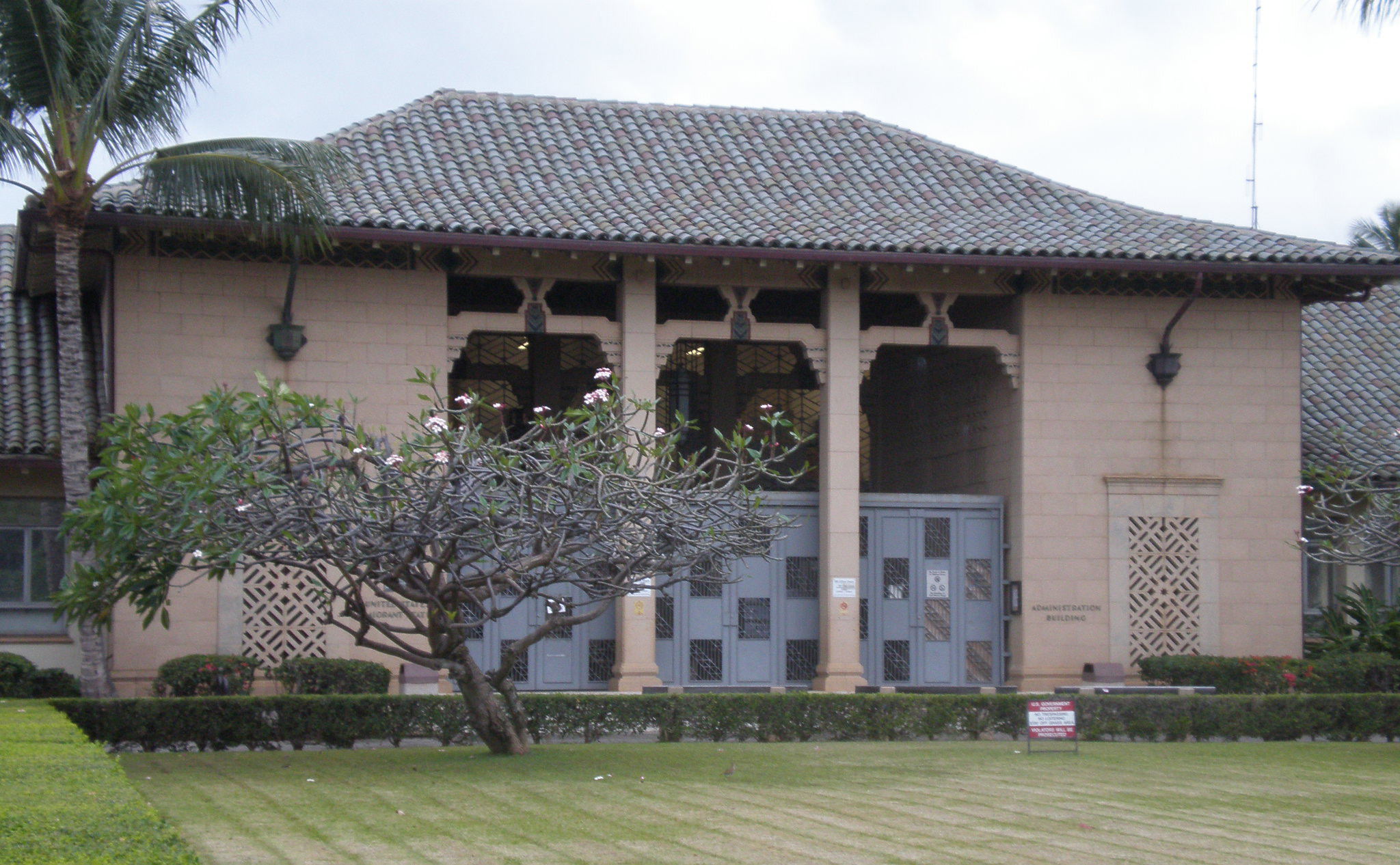
Main entrance

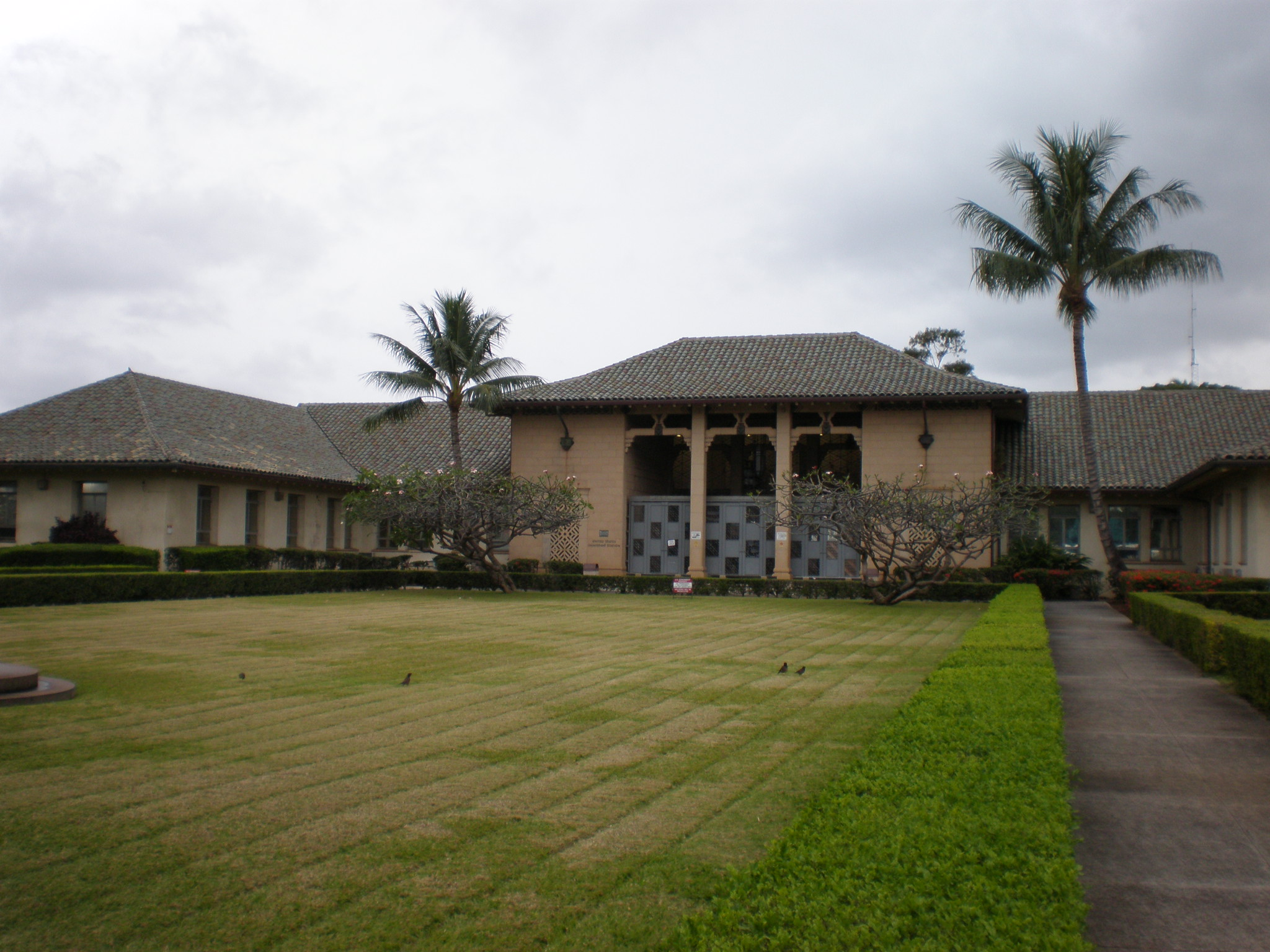
Front lawn
