= Eyman (surname) =

Eyman is an Old English surname. Notable people with the surname include:

- Frank Eyman (1898–1984), American prison warden
- Scott Eyman (born 1951), American author, book editor, and art critic
- Tim Eyman (born 1965), American political activist and businessman
