= Jessie Eyman–Wilma Judson House =

Historic house in Hawaii, United States

- U.S. National Register of Historic Places
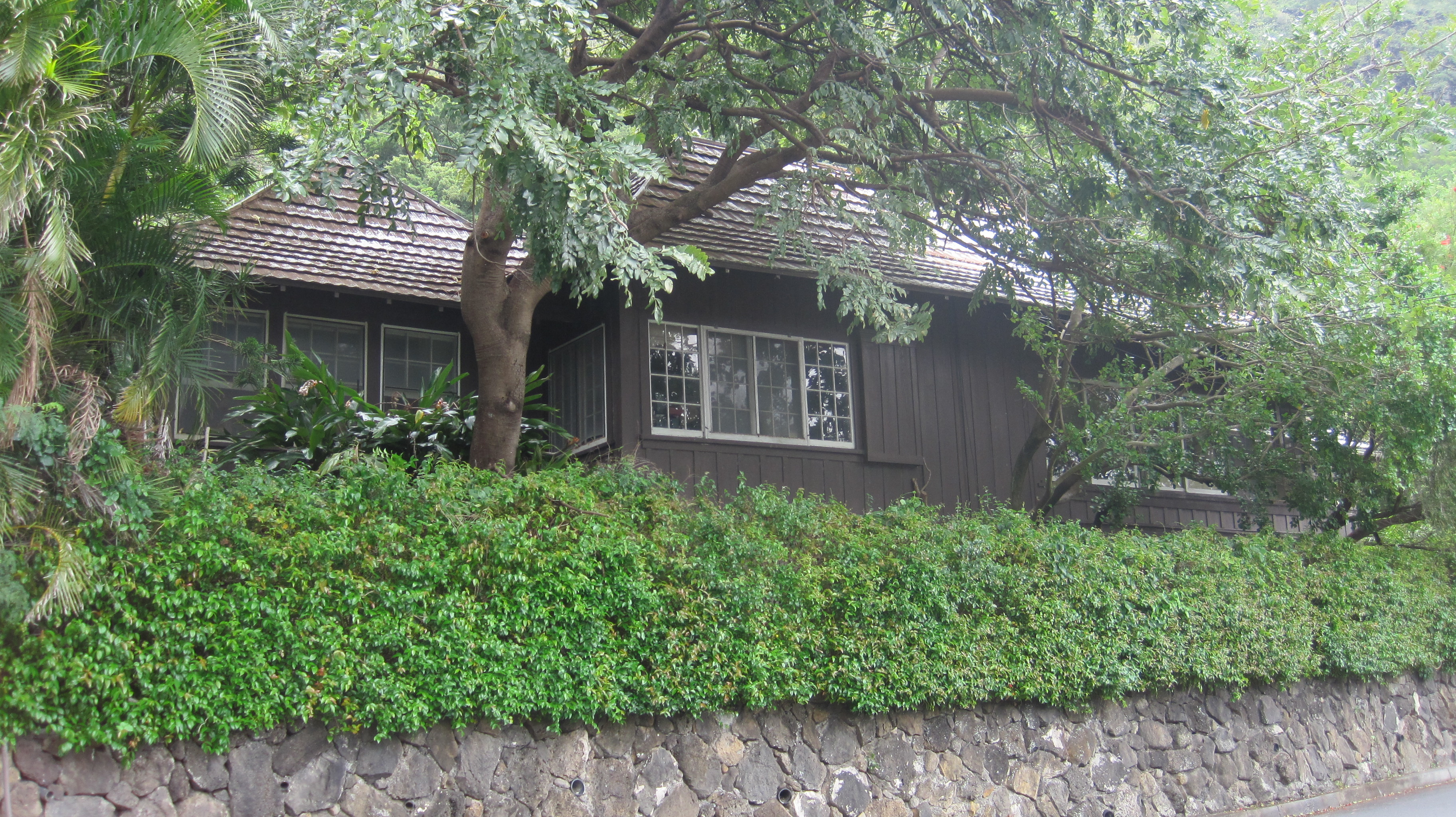
- Front elevation

- Location within Hawaii
- Location: 3114 Paty Dr., Honolulu, Hawaii
- Coordinates: 21°18′53″N 157°48′12″W
- Area: 0.2 acres (0.081 ha)
- Built: 1926
- Architect: C.W. Dickey
- Architectural style: "Hawaiian"
- NRHP reference No.: 86001621

The Jessie Eyman–Wilma Judson House at 3114 Paty Drive in Honolulu, Hawaiʻi, was one of the earliest residences designed by C.W. Dickey in his "Hawaiian style" after he finally returned to the islands for good in 1925. It was built in 1926 for Jessie Eyman and Wilma Judson, two nurses who arrived from Illinois in 1925. The house was added to the National Register of Historic Places in 1986.

The house sits on a sharply triangular hillside lot overlooking Manoa Valley at the intersection of Alani Drive (below) and Paty Drive (above, formerly Dillingham Drive). Its "Hawaiian style" architecture includes Dickey's trademark double-pitched hip roof with overhanging eaves, ample windows, and an enclosed lanai at the south-facing entrance. The single-story house, one-room deep, with board-and-batten siding, wraps around an open courtyard in the rear. One wing off the living room contains two bedrooms and a bath. The dining room and kitchen occupy the right rear wing, near a maid's quarters and a garage on the south side.

The original owners lived in the house until 1940, when Judson sold her share to Eyman, who sold the house in 1943. As nurses, they set up the first Physicians Telephone Exchange in the Territory. Judson also worked many years for Dr. Forrest Joy Pinkerton, who founded the Blood Bank of Hawaiʻi and the Pan-Pacific Surgical Association. Eyman managed the Mabel Smyth Memorial Building from the time it was built in 1941 until she retired in 1952.

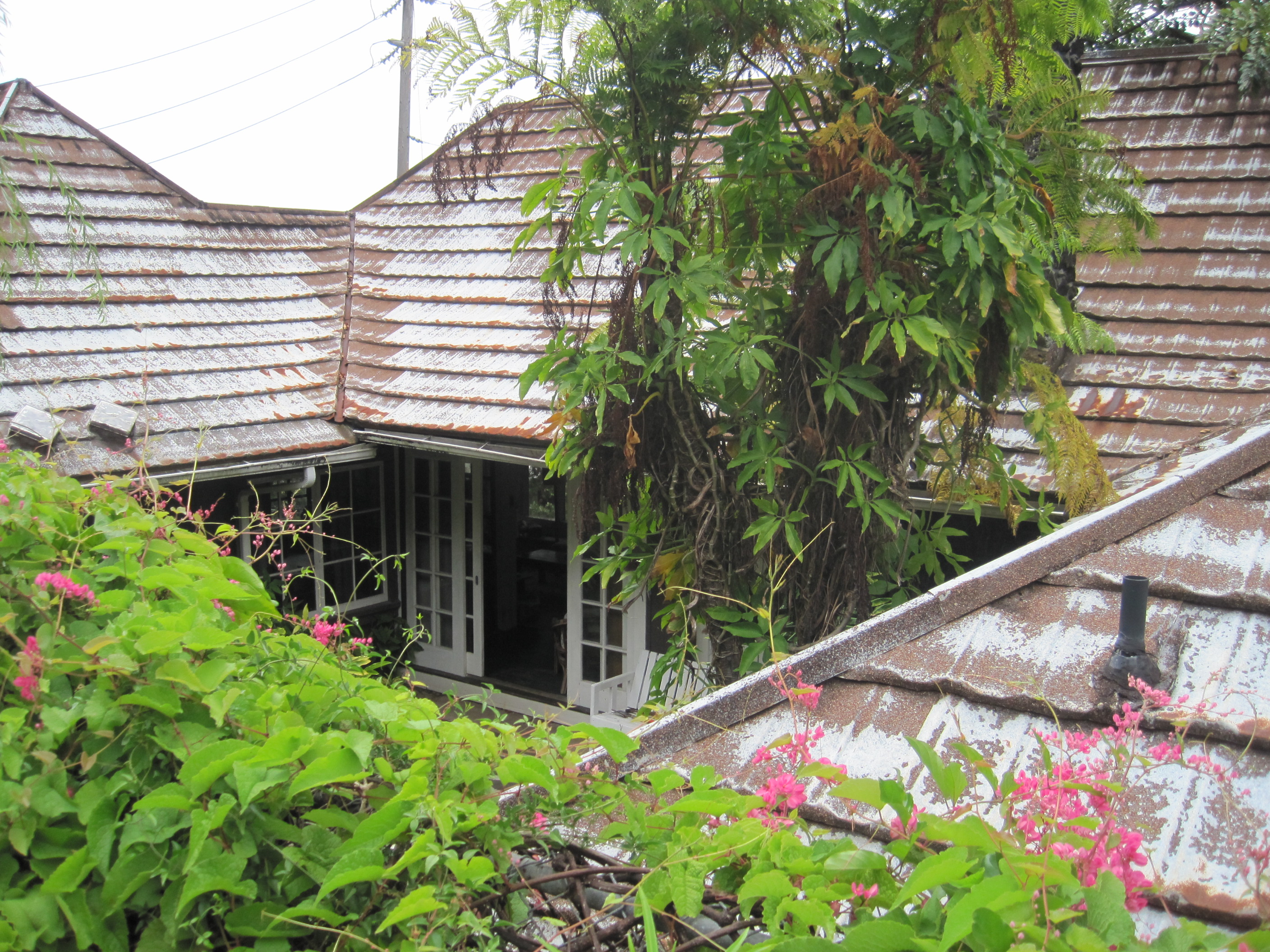
Rear courtyard

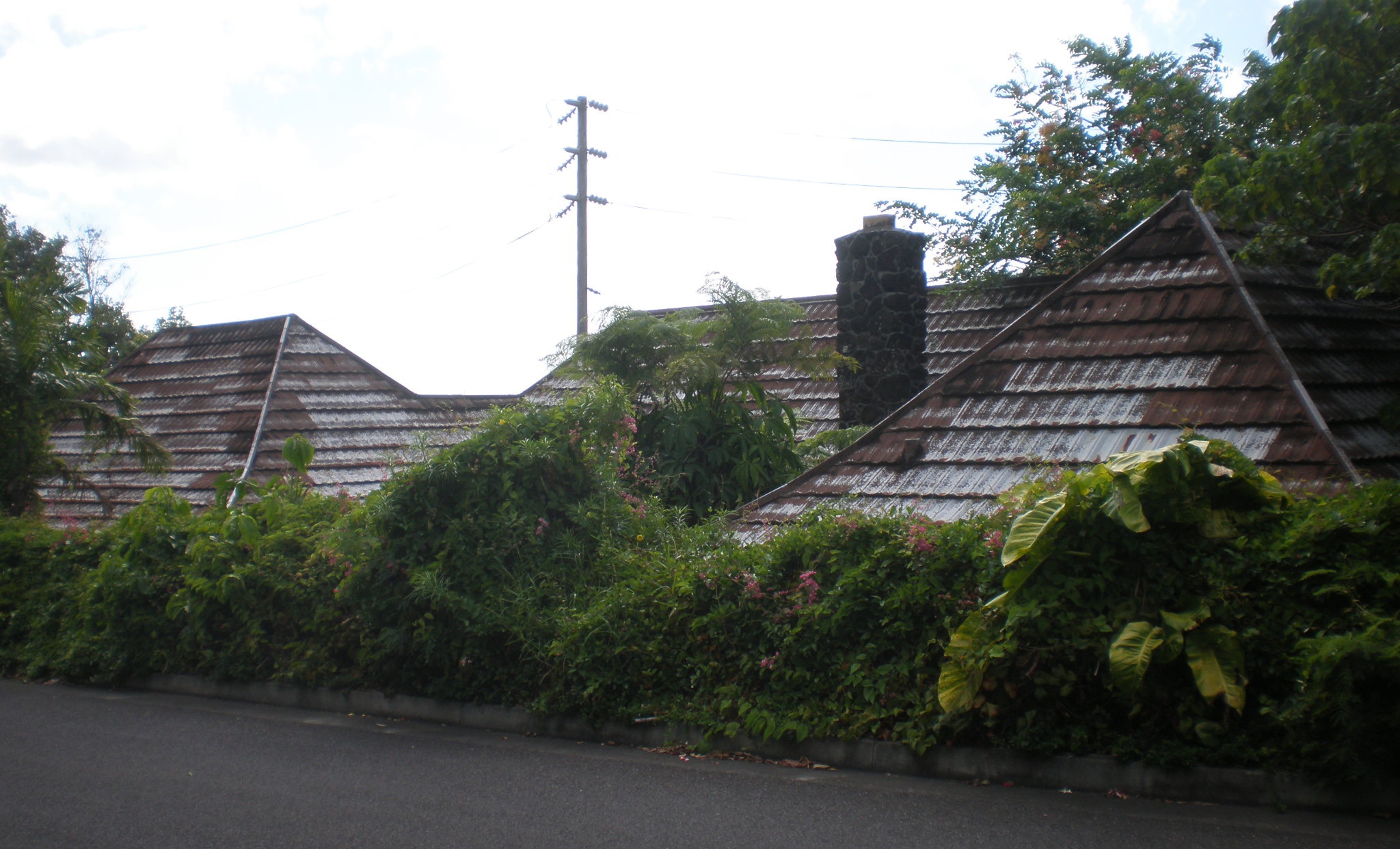
Dickey rooflines
