= Halekulani (hotel) =

Hotel in Honolulu, Hawaii, United States

Coordinates: 21.277878°N 157.831931°W

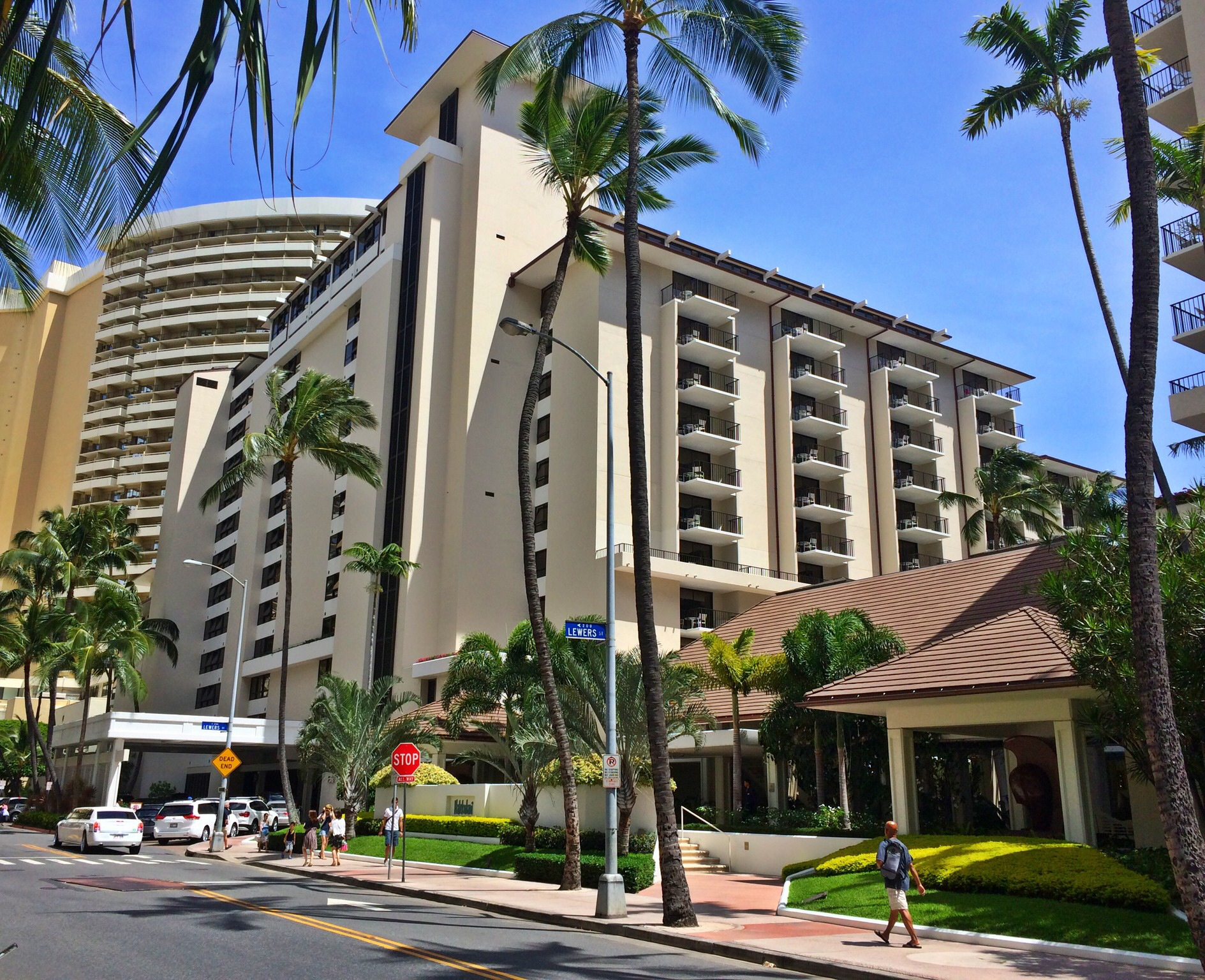
- Part of the hotel campus (foreground) from Kalia Road
- Alternative names: Halekūlani

General information
- Location: 2199 Kalia Road; Waikiki, Honolulu, Hawai'i
- Opening: 1984
- Operator: Halekulani Corporation

Design and construction
- Architects: Killingsworth and Associates

Other information
- Number of rooms: 453
- Number of suites: 42
- Number of restaurants: 3
- Parking: Valet

Website
- http://www.halekulani.com

Halekulani (var. Halekūlani) is an oceanfront luxury hotel on Waikiki Beach in Honolulu, Hawaii. The current hotel was built in 1984, and contains 453 rooms in five buildings on 5 acres (20,000 m^{2}) of property.

The name Halekūlani is a combination of Hawaiian words (hale + kū + lani) meaning "House Befitting Heaven". It is commonly spelled "Halekulani" without the macron (kahakō).

The hotel and corporation has been owned and operated by the Japanese company Mitsui Fudosan since their purchase and subsequent redevelopment of the historic property in 1981.

== History ==
In 1883, businessman Robert Lewers built a two-story house on the site of the modern hotel's main building. In 1907, Lewers leased the property to journalist Edward Irwin, who converted it to a hotel called the Hau Tree. It was purchased in 1917 by Juliet and Clifford Kimball, who established it as Halekulani. The Kimballs enlarged the resort over the years, purchasing a neighboring plot of land and adding additional buildings, including a central building designed by C.W. Dickey, and built in 1931.

Admiral Kimmel, CinC of the US Pacific Fleet, dined at the hotel on the evening of 6 December 1941, the night before the Japanese attack on Pearl Harbor. After the Kimballs' deaths, their heirs sold the hotel to the Norton Clapp family in 1962 for $4.2 million.

The original Halekulani was a plain residential hotel, more an informal grouping of simple bungalows on simple landscaping, offering inexpensive, unpretentious accommodations, with simple food. Later it grew into a more conventional hotel with numerous buildings containing several rooms each and two restaurants; one being the House Without a Key made famous by the Earl Derr Biggers novel of the same name. The other was the Coral Tree Lanai. In 1978, the Clapps announced their intention to replace the aging collection of structures with a modern luxury hotel.

On January 15, 1981 the hotel was purchased by Mitsui Fudosan USA and incorporated as the Halekulani Corporation, a U.S. based company. The current 453-room hotel structure opened in 1984.

== Facilities ==
Halekulani has received numerous awards, including a World's Best 2005 award from Travel & Leisure magazine. It received Four Stars from Mobil Travel Guide and a AAA Four Diamonds rating. The hotel is a member of The Leading Hotels of the World, a marketing and trade associations geared toward luxury hotels.

There are three restaurants on the property – House Without a Key, Orchids, and La Mer. It is also the home of SpaHalekulani and the Lewers Lounge.

== Halekulani company ==
Halekūlani hired luxury hospitality executive Peter Shaindlin as COO in 2003. He has overseen continual improvements to the brand, as well as construction of the Halekūlani Okinawa hotel, on Okinawa Island, Japan, in 2019. Additionally, the corporation acquired the boutique Waikiki Parc hotel across the street, and has rebranded it as Halepuna Hotel Waikiki.

Mitsui also owns the Imperial Hotel group in Japan and their half-dozen properties serve as hotel partners to the Halekūlani properties in Hawaii and Okinawa.

== Notable features ==
- The swimming pool's bottom is covered in 1.2 million South African glass mosaic tiles that form a distinctive design in the shape of a Cattleya orchid.
- A century-old Kiawe tree in the outside area of House Without a Key
- Mahiole (Feathered helmet), a pair of 1983 stone sculptures by Charles W. Watson
