= Eleanor Fitchen =

American conservationist

Eleanor Beach Fitchen (October 9, 1912 in Manhattan – April 20, 2009) was an American conservationist, preservationist and philanthropist. From her earliest years until her death in April 2009, Eleanor led a rewarding and memorable life and left a legacy that included the founding of several not-for-profit organizations, the conservation of hundreds of acres of open space, the creation of two historic districts, the restoration and preservation of half-dozen century old structures and the respect and admiration of hundreds of individuals.

== Parents ==
Eleanor's father was renowned sculptor Chester Beach and her mother, acclaimed nature artist Eleanor Hollis Murdock Beach. The couple met in France where Mr. Beach was studying sculpture and Miss Murdock was studying painting. They married in 1910 and settled in Rome for two years where their first daughter, Beata, was born. The couple returned to America in 1912 moving into an apartment on West 96th Street where daughters Eleanor and Natalie were born. After Natalie's birth in 1913, the family moved into a brownstone on East 17th Street where Chester Beach established a large sculpture studio to practice his art.

== Early Education ==
Eleanor spent her formative years in Manhattan, where she and her sisters attended Friends Seminary for their early education. Eleanor's experiences at Friends Seminary helped to mold her character and values, profoundly influencing her; and through her, all those she touched.

== Summers in the Country ==
The family spent summers in the upstate New York towns of North Salem and Southeast where Eleanor developed an attachment for rural communities that she would cherish and protect for all of her days. It was at this time that Chester Beach met Erastus Tefft, a Wall Street financier with a country estate on Starr Ridge Road. Tefft wanted portrait busts of his daughters and, in 1915 he traded the artist a 10-acre (40,000 m^{2}) parcel of his Starr Ridge property for the sculptures. That year, Chester Beach began construction of a garage and studio on the property and the next summer the family moved to it.

== "Oldwalls" ==
Using that structure for a base of operations, the Beach family began construction of the main house that would become the family home for the rest of the century and beyond. Construction materials came from the stone walls that crisscrossed the property's old farm fields with the huge foundations stones being dragged into place by a team of oxen. The property was named Oldwalls to memorialize its construction materials and it stands today as an integral part of the Starr Ridge/Starr Lea Historic district.

== Europe ==
Eleanor went through the tenth grade at Friends Seminary before the family returned to Europe in 1927. The three girls attended boarding school in Lausanne, Switzerland, while Chester and Mrs. Beach settled again in Rome for two years. Chester needed to be near the marble quarries of Carrara, Italy that provided the raw materials for a large fountain and zodiac statues group for the new terrace at the Cleveland Museum of Art.

During the summer of 1929, the family walked through Switzerland and Germany, staying in small inns along the way. Two walking canes on which they carved the names of the towns they visited are cherished Fitchen family treasures. Around the top of each one is carved "walk, climb, live."

== Vassar College ==
The family returned to America in time for Eleanor to start at Vassar College in the fall of 1930. She was the first Beach or Murdock to attend college, graduating in 1934. Her degree in Archeology proved valuable to her avocations of preservation and restoration. While at Vassar, Eleanor met Paul Fitchen.

== The Woman's Prison Association ==
In NYC she had a long-term involvement with the Women's Prison Association and was on the board of its Hopper Home, a half way house for recently released offenders, for which she created a fund raising thrift shop. Her involvement with prisoners here helped establish her credentials for a work release program she would establish later, in Putnam County.

== Early Married Life ==
Eleanor and Paul were married in the Beach's 17th Street brownstone on December 29, 1934, which was their primary residence until Paul retired in 1967. Their first home was an apartment overlooking Gramercy Park where their first child, Douglas, was born in 1936 and their second, Ellen, in 1939. In 1940, accommodations in the brownstone were rearranged for the growing family. Chester and Mrs. Beach moved into an apartment on the top floor and the Fitchens took over the lower floors where their third child Anne, was born in 1943.

Following in the footsteps of the three Beach children, the three Fitchen children attended Friends Seminary for their early education. The family spent weekends and summers at Oldwalls in Southeast where three generations worked side by side from 1945 to 1947 to build a small stone cottage that would become home to the Fitchens when in Southeast.

== Burma ==
In 1951, while an officer at the Federal Reserve Bank of New York, Paul Fitchen was invited by the Union Bank of Burma (now Myanmar) to live in Rangoon (now Yangon) for a year to help establish decimal currency and a central bank law for that newly independent country. He flew directly there in July while Eleanor led the children, aged 15, 12, and 8, through Europe and Egypt from where they took a freighter for a slow voyage on to Burma.

Upon her return from Rangoon, Eleanor Fitchen was active with the Asia Society in New York City. She worked to welcome artists and writers to America, helping them with exhibitions and tours and finding studio or living facilities. Eleanor went to great lengths to locate and catalog old Burmese manuscripts which were held by American universities.

== The Fitchens at Oldwalls ==
Chester Beach died in 1956 and, following the death of his wife Eleanor in 1965, occupancy of the Oldwalls property fell to the Fitchens, who continued to use it as a weekend and summer residence. On Paul's retirement as Executive Director of the New York Clearing House in 1967 they relocated to the main house at Oldwalls, where they lived for the remainder of their lives.

== Eleanor's Boys ==
Eleanor and Judge Tuttle established a work release program of court designated community service for youthful offenders though an arrangement made with the Putnam County Sheriff's office. "Her boys" worked alongside her every weekend for twenty years maintaining old cemeteries, creating pocket parks and restoring buildings. Although Eleanor retired from the program at the age of 80, it remains an active and rewarding component of the Putnam County Sheriff's convict rehabilitation program.

At Eleanor's memorial, one of her granddaughters related that "when working in Boston as a catering manager, I was sitting with clients at a menu-tasting making small talk. One of the men mentioned that he was from Brewster, New York, so I said 'Oh, my grandmother lives there.' He asked who she was and I said 'Eleanor Fitchen.' He stopped eating, put down his fork and said with awe 'Your grandmother changed my life.' He had been one of 'her boys' and after his time working with her, decided that his life was going to be more than picking up garbage and went on to work many years with American Airlines."

== The Non-Profit Organizations ==
Soon after moving to Southeast, Eleanor joined the executive board of the Southeast Museum and its Landmarks Preservation Committee. Eleanor saw the value of incorporating the group into an independent not-for-profit that is today's Landmarks Preservation Society of Southeast [LPSS]. In its new incarnation, the LPSS was able to raise the funds needed to restore the Walter Brewster House, the Old Southeast Church and its adjacent school house. Eleanor then spearheaded the campaigns to add these and other Putnam County structures to the New York State Landmarks and National Register of Historic Places. She actively promoted beautification throughout the Village of Brewster, the Town of Southeast and the county of Putnam, NY.

== Preserving Natural Resources ==
With the advent of Interstate 684 and Interstate 84, Eleanor and Paul grew concerned about the abrupt loss of vast acres of woodland and natural habitat. In 1969, the couple founded Southeast Open Spaces, Inc. [SOS] to preserve and protect natural resources through ownership of sensitive lands, property easements and environmental education. As demand grew for a county-wide land trust and properties were acquired outside of the Town of Southeast, the name of the organization was changed to Save Open Spaces, Inc., and then to Putnam County Land Trust: Save Open Spaces, Inc. (PCLT). It is now one of the oldest land trusts in New York State with an inventory of more than 500 acres (2.0 km^{2}) of diverse habitat with nearly every parcel accessible to the public via well maintained trails.

== Lobbying for Open Space ==
Eleanor and Paul lobbied local and national politicians to promote an important bill under consideration by the United States Congress in 1988. H.R. 4127^{[unfit]} was introduced and passed in the 2nd session of the 100th Congress, to establish the American Heritage Trust, for purposes of enhancing the protection of the nation's natural, historical, cultural, and outdoor recreational heritage. This bill would help to preserve historic homes and properties, open space, nature preserves, important architecture and landmarks by providing public funding. Eleanor gained the support of the Putnam County Executive and Putnam County Legislature to advocate for its passage in Washington, D.C.

== The 1814 Courthouse ==
Eleanor's efforts and leadership were instrumental in saving the Putnam County Courthouse in Carmel, New York. She worked with elected and appointed officials to identify the scope of work, to earmark the funding for the project and to identify and engage the skilled historical restoration contractor to execute the task. The courthouse was closed from 1988 through 1994 while the restoration effort progressed to completion.

== Eleanor a widow at 77 ==
In August 1990, Paul Fitchen died at home, age 88, following cancer surgery.

== Concerned Residents of Southeast ==
Eleanor continued her community involvement and in 1996, local opposition to the construction of a massive multi-screen theater and parking lot on Route 6 in Southeast led Eleanor Fitchen to organize others to form the Concerned Residents of Southeast [CRSE]. The project was believed to have significant environmental consequences to the water supply for New York City because of its proximity to the East Branch Reservoir. Eleanor was CRSE's co-founder and first president. The organization continues to conduct non-partisan research into local development and endeavors to educate the community regarding various types of development projects. CRSE remains a significant voice for local citizens and another tribute to Eleanor's determination to preserve the community for the people.

== Eleanor dies at 96 ==
Eleanor Fitchen died at home on April 20, 2009 at the age of 96. She was predeceased by her husband in 1990; by sister Beata Porter (wife of artist, Vernon Porter) in November 2007; and by her son Douglas Beach Fitchen of Ithaca, NY in 2008. Her sister Natalie Redway died soon after her in June 2009. Her daughter Ellen Tappan of Wolfeboro, NH, died in 2011. Her surviving daughter Anne Burton lives in London, England, by eleven grandchildren and fourteen great grandchildren. The memorial service held in her honor at the Old Southeast Church on June 20, 2009, was attended by nearly all of her family members from all over the world and by numerous friends from all walks of life.

== State Senate Recognition ==
Oldwalls, the Fitchen Family home in Southeast, is in New York State's 40th Senate district. Senator Vincent Leibell, who represented the district at the time of Eleanor's death, introduced a bill to the state senate: Resolution J1855 "Mourning the death of Eleanor Fitchen, distinguished citizen and devoted member of her community." It is a tribute to the life of this great woman and it recounts for posterity an anecdote known to most residents of Putnam County: "Devoted to safeguarding pieces of the past, Eleanor Fitchen once locked herself and a granddaughter in the Old Southeast Church on Route 22 to prevent its destruction." Her strategy succeeded. It drew the press and local radio and overwhelming public support and it preserved the church which stands today, the oldest house of worship in Putnam County.

== The Fitchen Papers, a legacy ==
Eleanor's generosity continued after her death. Her daughters, Elli and Anne, gathered together countless papers, booklets, correspondence, leaflets, posters and other ephemera of Eleanor's lifetime of community involvement. These were donated to the Brewster Village Historian's Office, the Southeast Museum, the Landmarks Preservation Society of Southeast and the Putnam County Land Trust. Many of these documents are one-of-a-kind, previously unpublished essays about local historical figures, places, events or structures. Many were written by county, town or village historians of Putnam County spanning the latter half of the 20th century. Others were written by descendants of those who experienced "history" first hand. Many of these documents will be published here on Wikipedia, indexed by their authors or titles but categorized as "The Fitchen Papers."
