= Paul Fitchen =

American banker

Paul Russell Fitchen (October 7, 1901 in Ithaca, New York – August 25, 1990 in Brewster, New York) was an American banker. He graduated Williams College and the Harvard School of Business Administration to begin a career in banking.

Fitchen served for 23 years with the Federal Reserve Bank of New York in banking relations and as an examiner and then with the bank's cash and check handling operations.

Paul met Eleanor Beach, daughter of renowned sculptor Chester Beach, while she was attending Vassar College. Eleanor and Paul were married in the Beach's 17th Street brownstone on December 29, 1934, which was their primary residence until Paul retired in 1967. Their first home was an apartment overlooking Gramercy Park where their first child, Douglas, was born in 1936 and their second, Ellen, in 1939. In 1940, accommodations in the brownstone were rearranged for the growing family. Chester and Mrs. Beach moved into an apartment on the top floor and the Fitchens took over the lower floors where their third child Anne, was born in 1943.

In 1951, while an officer at the Federal Reserve Bank of New York, Paul Fitchen was invited by the Union Bank of Burma (now Myanmar) to live in Rangoon (now Yangon) for a year to help establish decimal currency and a central bank law for that newly independent country. He flew directly there in July while Eleanor led the children, aged 15, 12, and 8, through Europe and Egypt from where they took a freighter for a slow voyage on to Burma.

From 1957 until his retirement in 1967, Mr. Fitchen was executive director of the New York Clearing House Association at 100 Broad Street.

He was active in civic affairs and was chairman of the Town of Southeast's first Conservation Commission. He and his wife, Eleanor Fitchen, founded and organized Southeast Open Spaces (SOS), a nonprofit Putnam County land trust, where he became its first president. As the role of the organization changed to protect properties in neighboring towns, the name was changed to Save Open Spaces and then to The Putnam County Land Trust, Save Open Spaces, Inc.

Paul was also the president of the Brewster Public Library on Main Street in the Village of Brewster

Paul Fitchen died at his home in Brewster, N.Y. at age 88, following cancer surgery
