= Betty Waldo Parish =

American painter

- Born: Betty Waldo Parish (Note: There is uncertainty as to her birth name. See the Personal life and family section below.); 1910; Cologne
- Died: 1986 (aged 75–76)
- Spouse(s): Edward Stanhope Leonard, Whitney Darrow Jr., Richard Comyn Eames

Betty Waldo Parish (1910–1986) was an American printmaker and painter who exhibited with nonprofit organizations, including the Fine Arts Guild, the Pen and Brush Club, and the National Association of Women Artists, as well as commercial galleries. Best known for her etchings and woodcuts in a modernist representational style, she was also a watercolorist and oil painter and it was an oil painting of hers, "The Lower Lot," that won her the first of quite a few prizes during her career.

== Early life and training ==
After graduating from the Horace Mann School for Girls in New York, Parish attended the New School for Social Research and studied at the School of the Art Institute of Chicago, the Grand Central School of Art, and the Académie Julian in Paris. In 1930 or shortly before, she joined the Art Students League where she worked with Kenneth Hayes Miller, John Sloan, Reginald Marsh, Eugene Speicher, and Anne Goldthwaite. In the late 1930s or early 1940s she also attended the school at the Spokane Art Center.

== Career in art ==
In May 1932 Parish was one of some 200 artists who showed in the first Washington Square Outdoor Art Exhibition and in June she and eight other artists showed again at an outdoor gallery behind the Gotham Book Mart on 47th Street. (Note: The first Washington Square Outdoor Art Exhibition took place between May 28 and June 6, 1932. Participation was free of all charges and artists were able to keep all proceeds from any sales they made. The event was organized by a group calling itself the Artists' Aid Committee, having Vernon C. Porter as its leader. Each artist was given about ten feet of sidewalk space. They lined up along the south and west sides of Washington Square Park and spilled over onto Fourth and Macdougal Streets. The exhibition proved to be a success both for the artists and the city's residents, who enjoyed the country-fair-like atmosphere. Although much changed in organization event continues to be popular into the 21st-century.) In 1933 Parish was a founding member and officer of the Fine Arts Guild, a group that held exhibitions of members' works at Grant Studios and other galleries. (Note: The Fine Arts Guild was organized in March 1933 at the Grant Studios in Brooklyn Heights. It aimed to exhibit "worthwhile works of art," "regardless of style, school, or trend," to the buying public. Guild members were to be "artists of established merit." Dr. George de Cornell was its executive director. In addition to Parish, who was secretary, officers included Harry Leroy Taskey, Paul W. Fuerstenberg, and Herman Trunk.) Reviewing this show, the critic, Howard Devree, singled out a painting of hers called "Black Tower," calling it "grimly impressive." After appearing in group shows later in 1933 and early in 1934, Parish was given a solo exhibition in a gallery at the Eighth Street Playhouse. (Note: The gallery, sometimes called the Lounge Gallery and sometimes the Playhouse Gallery, was located in the Eighth Street Playhouse in Greenwich Village. Originally called the Film Guild Cinema, the playhouse was the first theater built exclusively to show movies. In 1933 it began giving exhibitions in joint sponsorship with Vernon C. Porter's Artists' Aid Committee. The committee selected artists who had difficulty finding places in which to show their work and charged them no fee of any kind. By 1938, 120 artists, including Parish, had been given their first solo exhibitions there.)

During the remainder of the 1930s Parish continued to exhibit exhibited etchings, woodblocks, and watercolors in the Washington Square outdoor exhibits and Fine Arts Guild. Her work also appeared in group shows at places such as the Corcoran Gallery and the galleries of the Municipal Art Committee. (Note: Mayor Fiorello La Guardia established the Municipal Art Committee in the fall of 1934 to provide employment for New York's musicians, performers, artists, and other out-of-work arts workers. Groups of artists submitted applications to the committee and its galleries' exhibitions were changed every two months.) She also joined and began appearing in annual exhibitions of the National Association of Women Painters and Sculptors. In 1939 she was awarded a prize in the National Association of Women Painters and Sculptors fiftieth anniversary exhibition. An image of the prize-winning painting, a landscape called "The Lower Lot," appeared with the New York Times article describing the show. During the late 1930s she made prints as an employee of the Federal Art Project of the Works Progress Administration.

She continued to show in group exhibitions during the 1940s, mostly those of the women's association, by then renamed the National Association of Women Artists. She showed a panoramic painting called "Washington Square South" in the 1942 show, which was, without explanation, called the 50th anniversary exhibition. (Note: The association was originally called the Woman's Art Club. It was founded at the end of 1889 and held its first annual exhibition in 1890. Since there were years when the society did not hold an annual exhibition, neither 1939 nor 1942 was actually the year of the 50th annual.) In the mid-1940s she joined the Pen and Brush Club and began to show in its group exhibitions. (Note: The Pen & Brush Club was founded in 1894 by sisters, Janet C. and Mary Lewis, as a social club for women writers and artists. Members were required to be professionals in their fields. Ida Tarbell was its president for 30 years.) In 1944 the club awarded her first prize in the oil paintings category and in 1947 gave her an honorable mention. In 1941, 1942, and 1943 she exhibited with the American Society of Etchers and in 1943 was awarded a prize for work by a non-member.

In the early 1950s she won further recognition from the New York Society of Women Artists and the Pen and Brush Club. In the late 1950s and the 1960s her work appeared in retrospective solo exhibitions in places such as the Utica Public Library and the Rural Supplementary Education Center in Stamford, New York. She was given posthumous solo exhibitions at the Sylvan Cole Gallery (1988) and the Susan Teller Gallery (1988) as well as one group (2005) and one duo exhibition (2009) at the Teller Gallery.

=== Artistic style and critical reception ===
Betty Waldo Parish, Thompson Memorial, Vassar College, 1932, wood engraving, 10 x 7 inches

Betty Waldo Parish, Country Barn, lithograph in colors, about 1936, 12 1/4 x 16 3/4 inches

Vineyard Haven (Martha's Vineyard), 1945, wood engraving, 9 x 15 inches

Betty Waldo Parish, Four Figures, 1950, wood engraving printed in black and sepia, 10 x 15 inches

Parish was a skillful printmaker and painter who worked in a modernist representational style on subjects that were predominantly landscapes, cityscapes, figures, and still lifes. "Thompson Memorial, Vassar College," shown at left, illustrates her handling of a landscape in woodblock early in her career. "Country Barn," shown at right, illustrates her handling of color lithography at about the same time. "Vinyard Haven (Martha's Vinyard)," shown at left, illustrates her handling of a seascape in woodblock late in her career. "Four Figures," shown at right, illustrates her handling of figures in woodblock late in her career.

Critics in general singled out her work as being exceptional and worthy of attention but did not discuss its style, technique, or other artistic attributes. Howard Devree, the only critic with a major New York newspaper to discuss her work in any detail, limited himself to generalizations. Along with other artists in a group show, he said in 1933 that her work was free from "freakishness and imitation" and (as already noted) later that year called one of her paintings "grimly impressive." In 1940 he said a painting called "Priston Road" was "forceful" and in 1941 he praised one of her prints for its "meticulous detail." In 1933 a critic for the New York Sun named Parish as one of a group whose works "edged to the fore" and accomplished "more or less engagingly what the artist set out to do." In 1940 a critic for an out-of-town paper called her work outstanding and said of one: "It is a fine example of modern treatment of landscape, exhibiting a fine sense of design with excellent color." The critic added, "Miss Parish's work is fresh, and her approach to her subject is modern."

== Personal life and family ==
Betty Waldo Parish was born in Cologne in 1910. Although she used Betty as her forename and sources of 1925 or later give that name, public records show her name as Elizabeth before that date. Her father was William Francis Parish (1874-1939), an engineer who specialized in machine lubricants and who was known for his work in military aviation and in developing synthetic oils. He was a U.S. citizen traveling in Germany when Betty Waldo Parish was born. Her mother was Josephine Driggs Parish (born about 1882). The two were married in Boston in 1904. Betty Waldo Parish had a sister, Helen K. Parish (born about 1913) and a brother William W. Parish (born about 1922). In 1930 she married Edward Stanhope Leonard (born about 1902), an illustrator. In 1935 that marriage ended in divorce and in 1938 she married Whitney Darrow Jr. (1909-1999), a New Yorker cartoonist. In 1942, after divorcing Darrow, she married Richard Comyn Eames, a farm equipment specialist and breeder of collies, ponies, and horses. Eames and Parish had two children, Richard Comyn Eames II (1945-1997), a sculptor whose professional name was Dickon Eames, and Elizabeth Parish Eames Roebling (born 1947), a journalist with the Inter Press Service. Sometime after the birth of the two children, Richard Comyn Eames moved to St. Croix, Virgin Islands, while Parish remained in New York. He did not attend the weddings of either child, both held in 1967.

Parish died in 1986.
