= Edna Allyn =

American librarian in Hawaii (1861–1927)

Edna Isabel Allyn (April 5, 1861 – June 7, 1927) was an American librarian, she was the first librarian of what is now the Hawaii State Library.

== Early life and education ==
Allyn was born on April 15, 1861, in Wellington, Ohio, U.S..

Allyn graduated from Hiram College in 1882, and became a public schoolteacher. She then earned a master's degree in Latin from Columbia University in 1902. After working in the Iowa State Industrial School's library, Allyn decided to study library science at Western Reserve University in 1905. After completing her education, she became the librarian of the Brooklyn sub-branch of the Cleveland Public Library.

== Hawaii ==
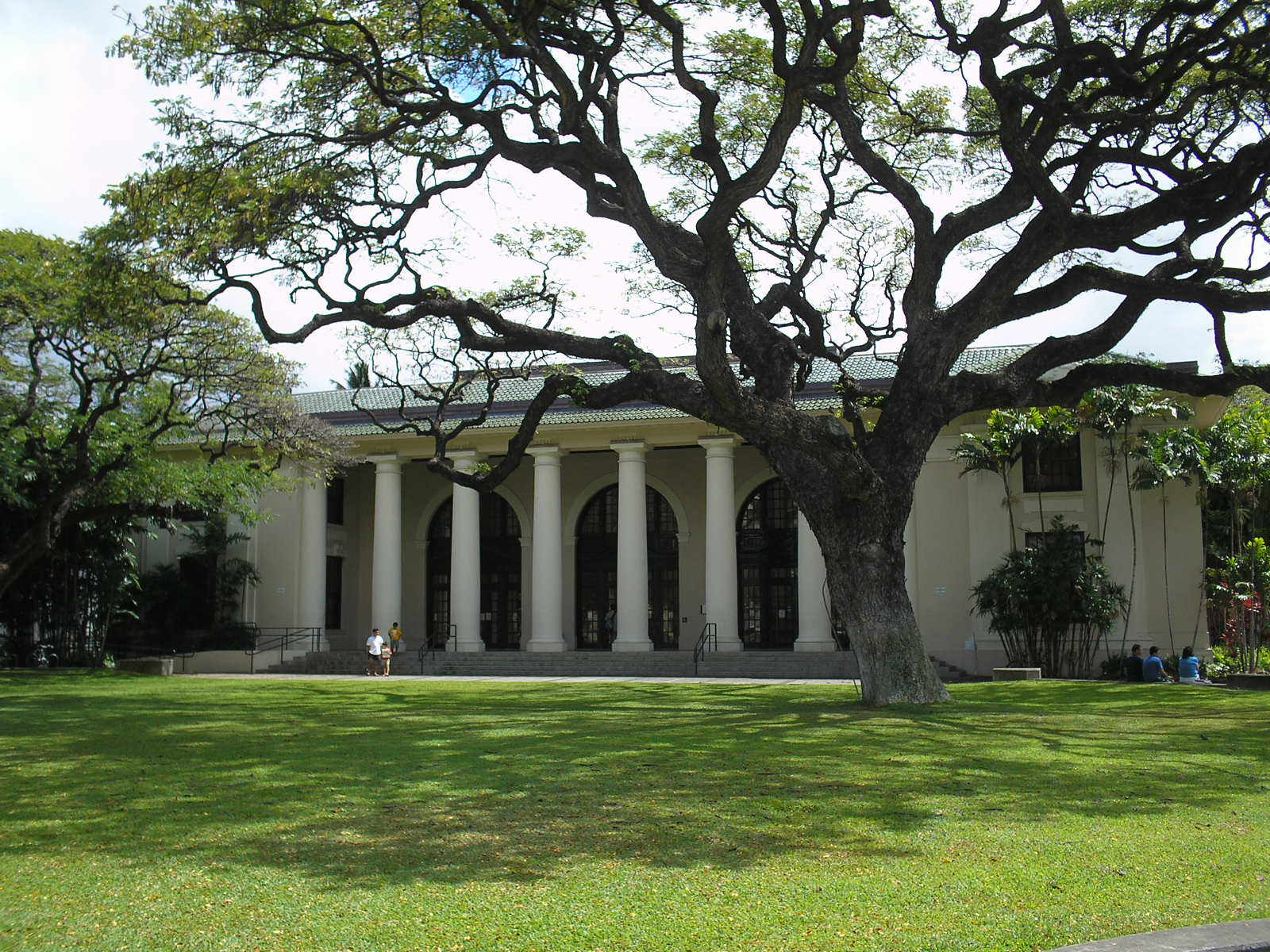
Hawaii State Library

Allyn became the librarian of the Honolulu Library and Reading Room Association, a subscription library, in 1907. When the Hawaii State Library was built in 1913, the Honolulu Library and Reading Room Association's collections formed the base of the new library's collection, so Allyn became the head librarian there.

During her tenure as librarian, Allyn changed the library from a subscription-based to a free public library, and expanded it to 350,000 books. In 1921, Allyn worked with the territorial government to create county libraries on each island. This became the foundation of the Hawaii State Library System.

What Allyn was especially known for was her commitment to working with children. She invited specialists from the mainland to give lectures and training sessions on storytelling and children's literature. Allyn also worked with local schools, including offering courses for teachers as a Department of Public Instruction program in 1919 and 1920. The children's room at the Hawaii State Library was created according to her plans, and was named after her when it was completed after her death. She died on June 7, 1927.
