= Doanesburgh, New York =

Coordinates: 41°26′16″N 73°34′31″W

Doanesburgh is an extinct locality in Putnam County, in the U.S. state of New York.

A post office called Doanesburgh was established in 1839, and remained in operation until 1855. The community was named after Benjamin Doane, an early settler.

== See also ==
- Old Southeast Church (Brewster, New York)
