= Juliette May Fraser =

Hawaiian American artist (1887–1983)

- Born: January 27, 1887; Honolulu, Kingdom of Hawaii
- Died: July 31, 1983 (aged 96); Honolulu, Hawaii, U.S.
- Resting place: O'ahu Cemetery, Honolulu, Hawaii, U.S.
- Education: Wellesley College (BA), Art Students League of New York, John F. Carlson School of Landscape Painting
- Known for: Painting, printmaking, muralist, illustrator
- Movement: Hawaiian Modernism

Juliette May Fraser (January 27, 1887 – July 31, 1983) was an American painter, muralist, illustrator, and printmaker in Hawaii.

== Early life and education ==
Juliette May Fraser was born on January 27, 1887, in Honolulu, Kingdom of Hawaii (now Hawaii, U.S.). Her parents were Nina Lee (née Dexter), and Charles Edward Fraser; her mother was a teacher and the first principal of Ka'iulani School, and her father worked as an accountant. She attended Punahou School, a college-prep high school in Honolulu.

After graduating from Wellesley College with a degree in art in 1915, she returned to Hawaii for several years. She continued her studies with Eugene Speicher and Frank DuMond at the Art Students League of New York and at the John F. Carlson School of Landscape Painting in Woodstock, New York.

== Career ==
Kana Wrestling the Turtle (1954) by Fraser, fresco on canec (sugarcane fiber-base insulation board manufactured by Hawaiian Cane Products Inc.), Hawaii State Art Museum

After her education Fraser returned to Hawaii to teach, like her parents who had both come to Hawaii as educators.

Fraser designed the Hawaii Sesquicentennial half dollar in honor of the 150th anniversary of Captain James Cook landing in the Hawaiian islands, which was sculpted by Chester Beach and issued in 1928.

In 1934, during the Great Depression, Fraser was invited to create a work of art for the Hawaii State Library by the Works Progress Administration's Federal Art Project. For three months she received US$35 a week to work on the project. When the funds ran out for the project, she continued on her own until ten murals were completed.

Fraser also created charcoal and conte murals for the 1939 Golden Gate International Exposition's Hawaii Building in San Francisco (now installed in lobby of the Hamilton Library, University of Hawaii at Manoa). Additionally she also made murals for the Ypapandi (or Ypapanti) Chapel on Chios Island in Greece.

During World War II, she worked for the U.S. military in designing camouflage.

In January 1978, the State of Hawaiʻi and Gov. George Ariyoshi presented her with the Order of Distinction for Cultural Leadership award.

She died at the age of 96 on July 31, 1983, in Honolulu.

== Collections ==
Huakaʻi-po, (c. 1952) linocut by Fraser

The Fine Arts Museums of San Francisco; Hawaii State Art Museum; Hawaii State Library; Honolulu Museum of Art; Isaacs Art Center; Library of Congress in Washington, D. C.; Metropolitan Museum of Art; Nelson-Atkins Museum of Art in Kansas City, Missouri; and University of Hawaii at Manoa, are among the public collections holding works by Fraser.

== Publications ==
- Colum, Padraic (1924). At the Gateways of the Day. Juliette May Fraser (illustrations). New Haven, CT: Hawaiian Legend & Folklore Commission, Yale University Press.
- Colum, Padraic (1925). The Bright Islands. Juliette May Fraser (illustrations). Hawaiian Legend & Folklore Commission, Yale University Press.
- Armitage, George Thomas (1944). Ghost Dog and Other Hawaiian Legends. Juliette May Fraser (illustrations). Honolulu, Hawaii: Advertiser Publishing Co.
- Pratt, Helen Gay (1948). Skippy's Picnic: Outdoors in Hawaii. Juliette May Fraser (illustrations). New York City: Scribner.
- Pratt, Helen Gay (1963). The Hawaiians: An Island People. Rosamond S. Morgan (illustrations), Juliette May Fraser (illustrations). Rutland, VT: Charles E. Tuttle Co.
