= Hiroki Morinoue =

American Hawaiian painter (born 1947)

- ヒロキ モリノーエ
- 'Butterfly Kimono' (2006), woodcut by Morinoue
- Born: 1947 (age 78–79); Kealakekua, Territory of Hawaii (now U.S.)
- Education: California College of Arts and Crafts (BFA)
- Occupations: Painter, printmaker

Hiroki Morinoue (born 1947, Japanese: ヒロキ モリノーエ) is an American Hawaiian visual artist, of Japanese descent. His artwork fuses western Impressionism with modern Japanese design. Morinoue lives in Holualoa, on the Big Island of Hawaii.

== Early life and education ==
Morinoue was born in 1947, in Kealakekua, Territory of Hawaii; and was raised near Holualoa, formerly a major coffee plantation town in the mountains above Kailua-Kona on the Big Island of Hawaii. Japanese workers were imported from Japan at the turn of the 20th century to Hawaii to work the plantations. Although the coffee plantations are gone, Holualoa remains a major producer and exporter of Kona coffee from a cooperative of private growers. In addition, a large artist colony has taken hold in the town itself.

Morinoue studied at the California College of Arts and Crafts (now California College of the Arts) in Oakland, California, where he received his BFA degree in 1973. Later, while in Japan, Morinoue studied with a master sumi-e artist and a master of woodblock printing.

== Works ==
It was Morinoue's seemingly abstract paintings of calm water on textured wood or woodblock prints that propelled him to prominence. The play of light on pebbles at the bottom of a creek or pond, bubbles, ripples, or the reflection on the surface of water are combined with a Japanese sense of balance and design in intense shades of aqua, black and blue creating art of refined, serene elegance. Subsequent works show a trend towards abstract art, experimentation in warmer palettes, rougher strokes, various subject matters and media such as ceramics and photography.

Hiroki Morinoue can be seen in several public and private collections in the USA (particularly in Hawaii) and Japan.

== Collections ==
- Hawaii State Library, Hawaii
- Hawaii Convention Center, Honolulu, Hawaii
- Hawaii State Foundation on Culture and the Arts, Honolulu, Hawaii
- Honolulu Council on Culture and the Arts, Hawaii
- Honolulu Museum of Art, Honolulu, Hawaii
- Honolulu Museum of Art Spalding House, Honolulu, Hawaii
- Achenbach Foundation for Graphic Arts, San Francisco, California
- National Park Collection, Maryland
- Mori Art Museum, Tokyo, Japan
- City of Fujisawa, Kanagawa, Japan
- Boulder Museum of Contemporary Art, Colorado
- Ross Art Collection, University of Michigan, Ann Arbor, Michigan
