= Hawaiʻi State Library =

Building in Honolulu, Hawaii

- U.S. National Register of Historic Places
- U.S. Historic district – Contributing property
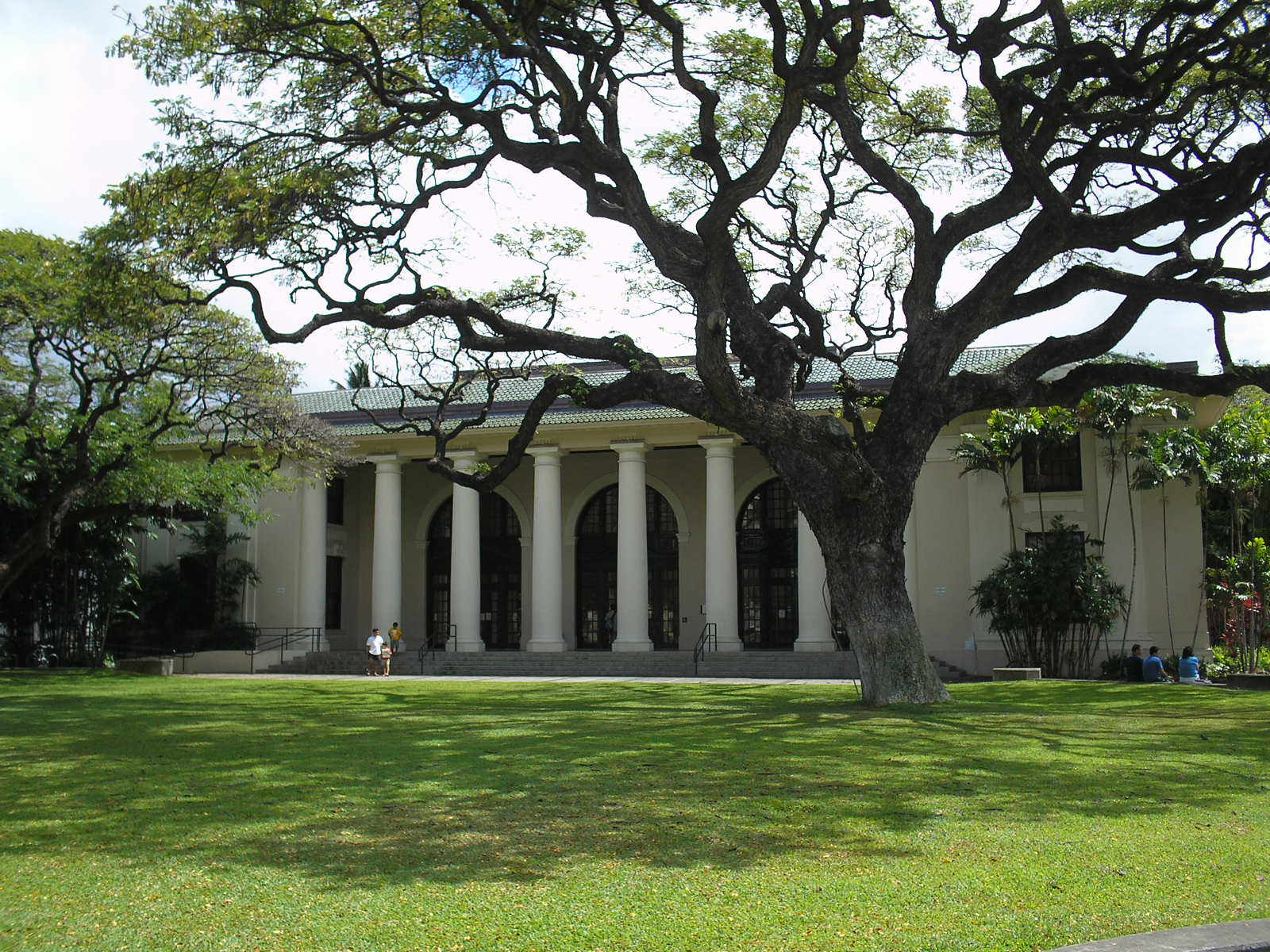
- Front facade
- Location: 478 S. King St., Honolulu, Hawaii, USA
- Coordinates: 21.30591°N 157.85746°W
- Built: 1911–1913
- Architect: Henry D. Whitfield
- Part of: Hawaii Capital Historic District
- NRHP reference No.: 78001020

Significant dates
- Opened: February 1, 1913
- Added to NRHP: 12/01/1978

The Hawaiʻi State Library is a historic building in Honolulu, Hawaii, United States, that serves as the seat of the Hawaiʻi State Public Library System, the only statewide library system and one of the largest in the United States. The Hawaiʻi State Library building is located in downtown Honolulu, adjacent to ʻIolani Palace and the Hawaiʻi State Capitol. Originally funded by Andrew Carnegie, the building was designed by architect Henry D. Whitfield. Groundbreaking took place in 1911 and construction was completed in 1913. In 1978, the building was added to the National Register of Historic Places, as a contributing property within the Hawaii Capital Historic District.

The building holds over 525,000 cataloged books. The entire Hawaiʻi State Public Library System has a collection of over 3 million books. Nearby is the Hawaiʻi State Archives which holds book collections of historical significance to Hawaii. The Edna Allyn Children's Room houses murals by artist Juliette May Fraser depicting Hawaiian legends while the garden courtyard features a mosaic of ocean currents by Hiroki Morinoue. Barbara Hepworth's cast bronze sculptures, named Parent I and Young Girl, greet visitors at the lawn in front of the building.

== History ==
Before the Hawaiʻi State Library was constructed, library facilities were provided by the Honolulu Library and Reading Room Association, founded in 1879 by the Kingdom of Hawaiʻi. Prior to this, the site was the location of Hāliʻimaile, the residence of Boki and Liliha and later, Victoria Kamāmalu and her father and brothers before they ascended Kamehameha IV and Kamehameha V. Hawaii's royalty (King Kalakaua, Queen Kapiolani, Queen Emma, and Princess Bernice Pauahi Bishop) gave both financial support and their personal book collections to the association. King Kalakaua also provided tax exemptions and a land grant for a permanent site in downtown Honolulu.

The Hawaiʻi State Library was funded by a grant from Andrew Carnegie. The Library met the government-related requirements for the grant with the cooperation of Walter F. Frear. Edna Allyn was the head librarian when it opened in 1913.

In 1921, the County Library Law established separate libraries on the islands of Kauaʻi, Maui, and Hawaiʻi, under minimal supervision by the Library of Hawaii, which restricted its services to Oʻahu. Even so, the latter quickly outgrew its quarters. In 1927, the Territorial legislature approved funding to expand and renovate the building. Construction was completed in 1930. Architect C.W. Dickey tripled its size by new wings to create an open-air courtyard in the center.

After statehood in 1959, the Hawaii State Legislature created the Hawaii State Public Library System, the only statewide system in the United States, with the Hawaii State Library building as its flagship branch. Throughout the 1970s and 1980s, the library continued to outgrow its facility. In 1990, it funded a second major renovation and expansion, which was completed in 1992. The renovations addressed air-conditioning, roofing, asbestos removal, plumbing, better access for the handicapped, and landscaping, while the expansion added a large wing to the rear of the building that blended well with the older wings.

== Library development in Hawaii ==
The library system of Hawaii State Library, which was established in June 1965, called for a new concept of organization that had to be created by the state librarian. This system would provide complete service to all aspects of society. Ideas were sourced from other established libraries and organizations, then integrated to create best practices for the library system. Although the Library System is an independent State agency, the state librarian is appointed by the Board of Education, and reports directly to the Superintendent of Education. Other government agencies that the state librarian reports to are the seven appointed School Advisory Councils, the four Library Advisory Commissions, and others that are engaged in education. The state librarian is responsible for the operation, planning, programming, and budgeting of all public libraries within the State; however, there are no local funds in Hawaii, and as such, the governor and legislature approve the funding and budget of the State Library.

== Gallery ==
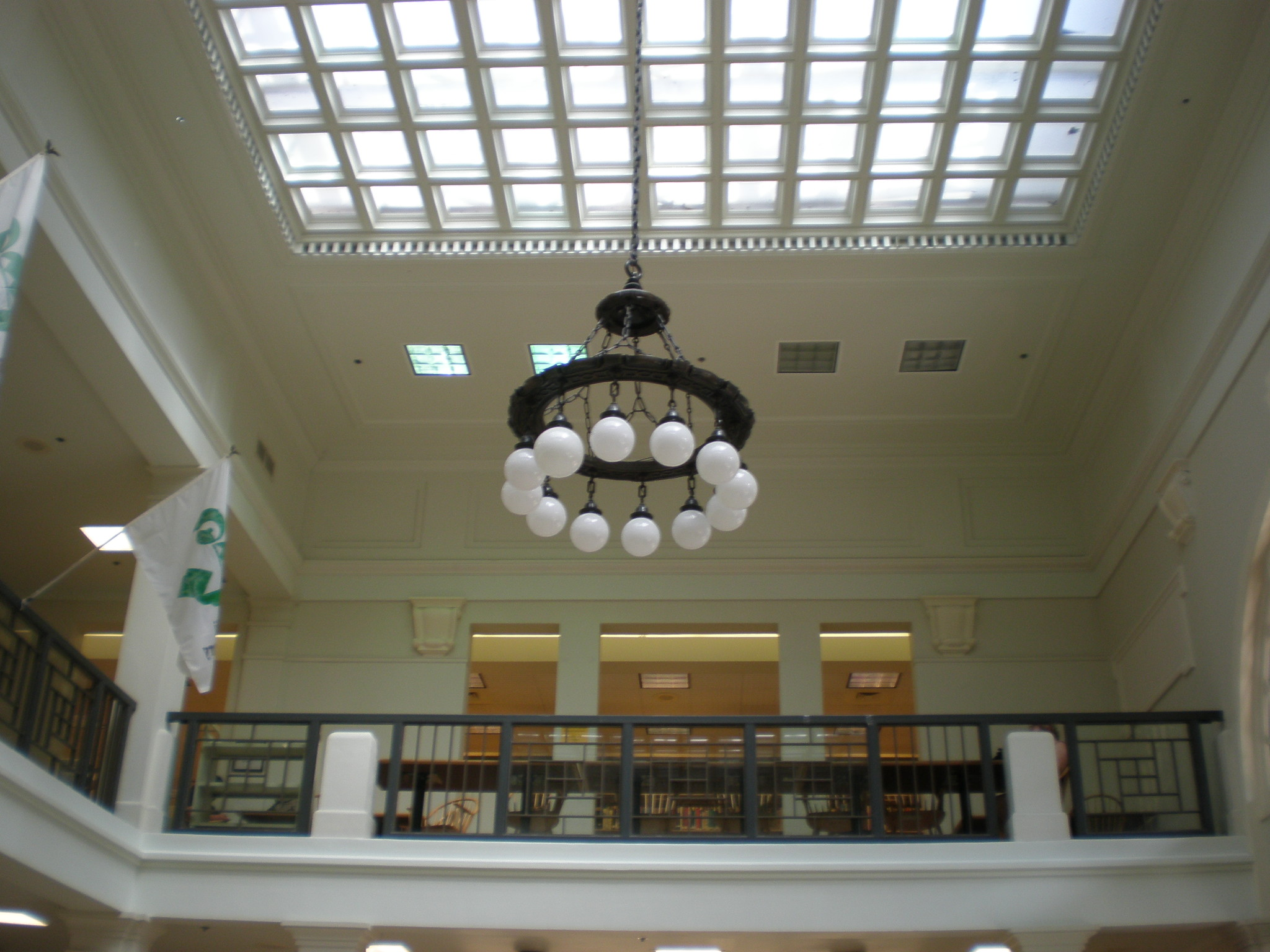
Skylight & chandelier above foyer

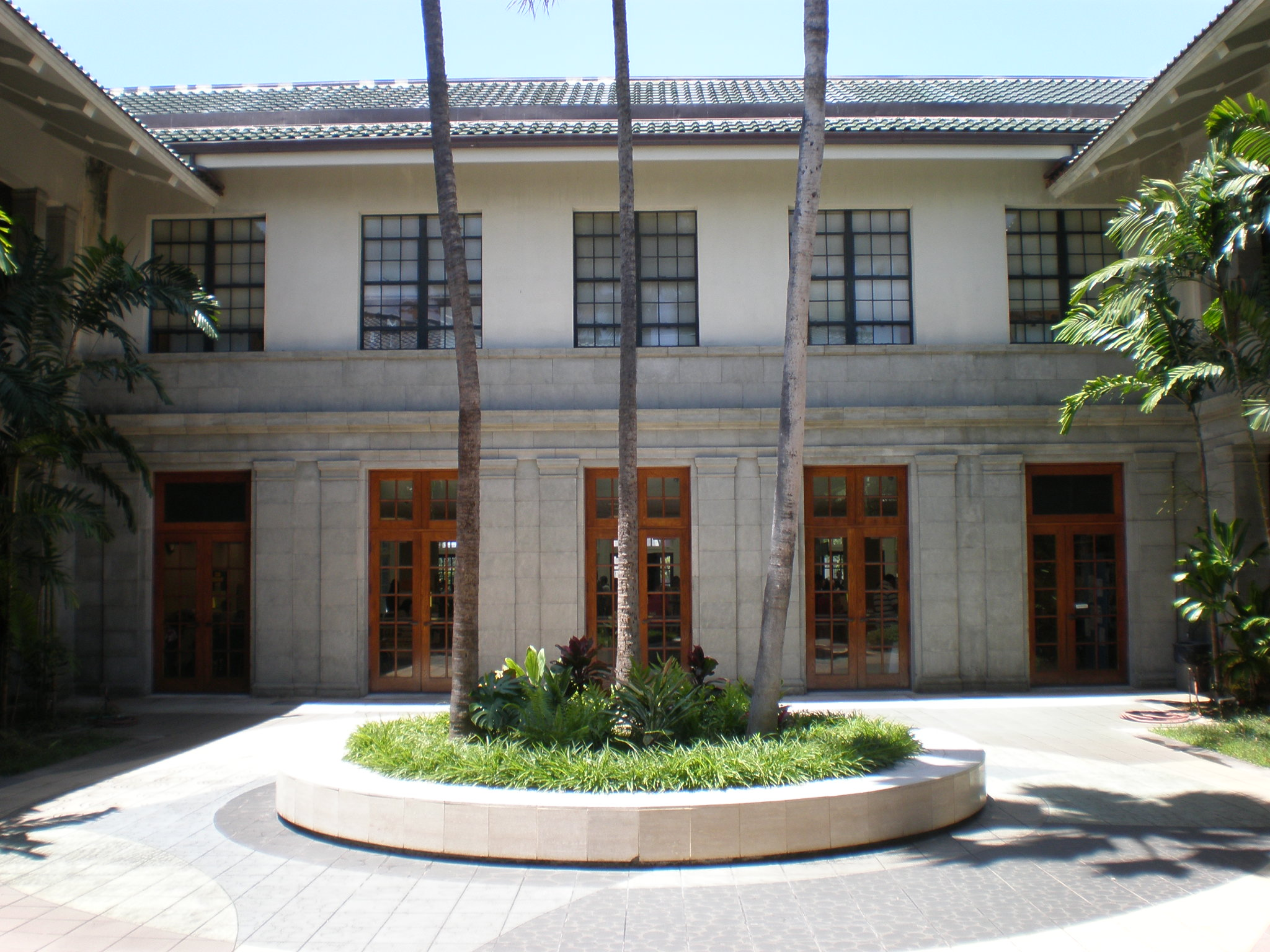
Interior courtyard facing front

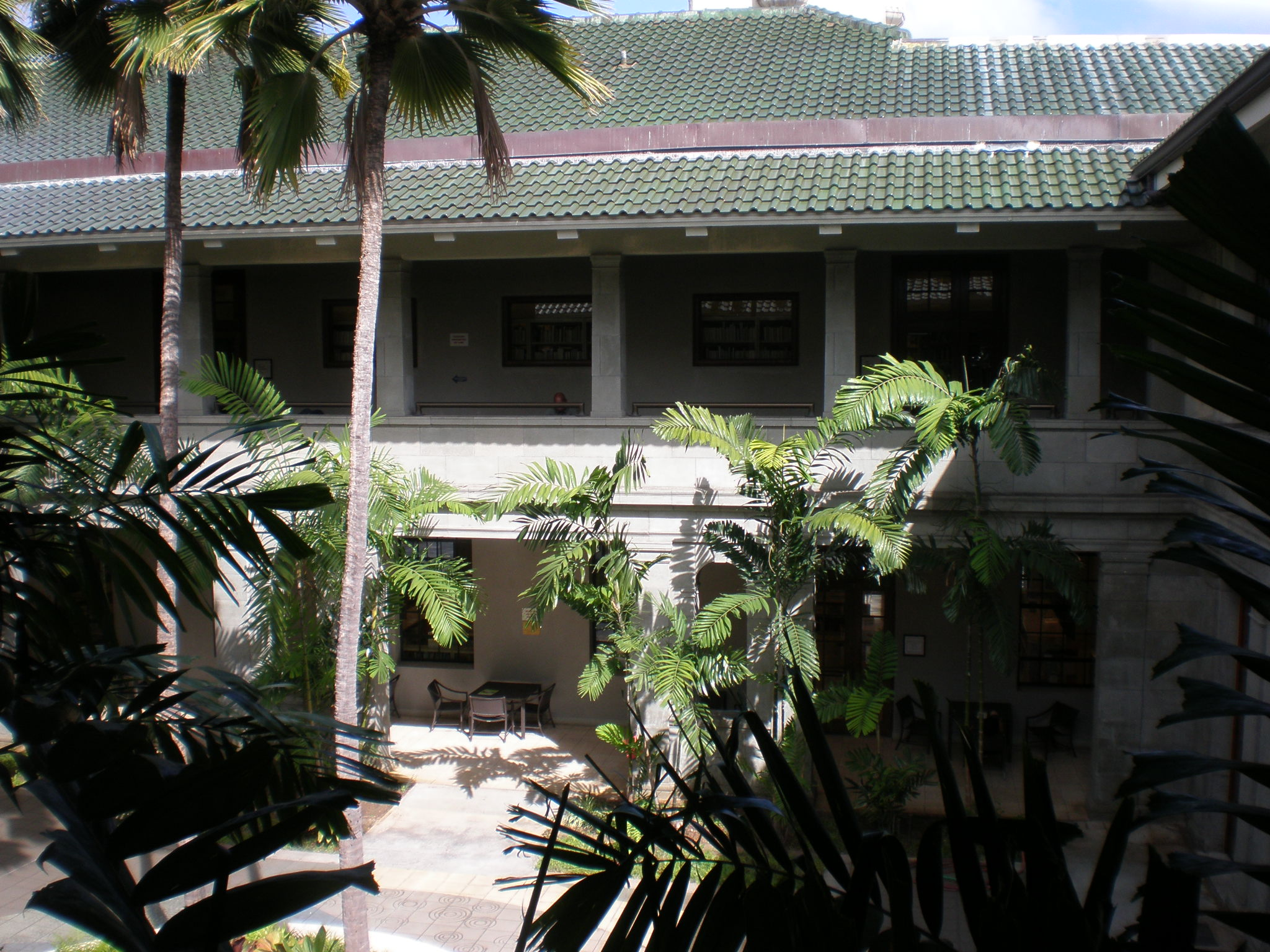
View of rear annex across courtyard

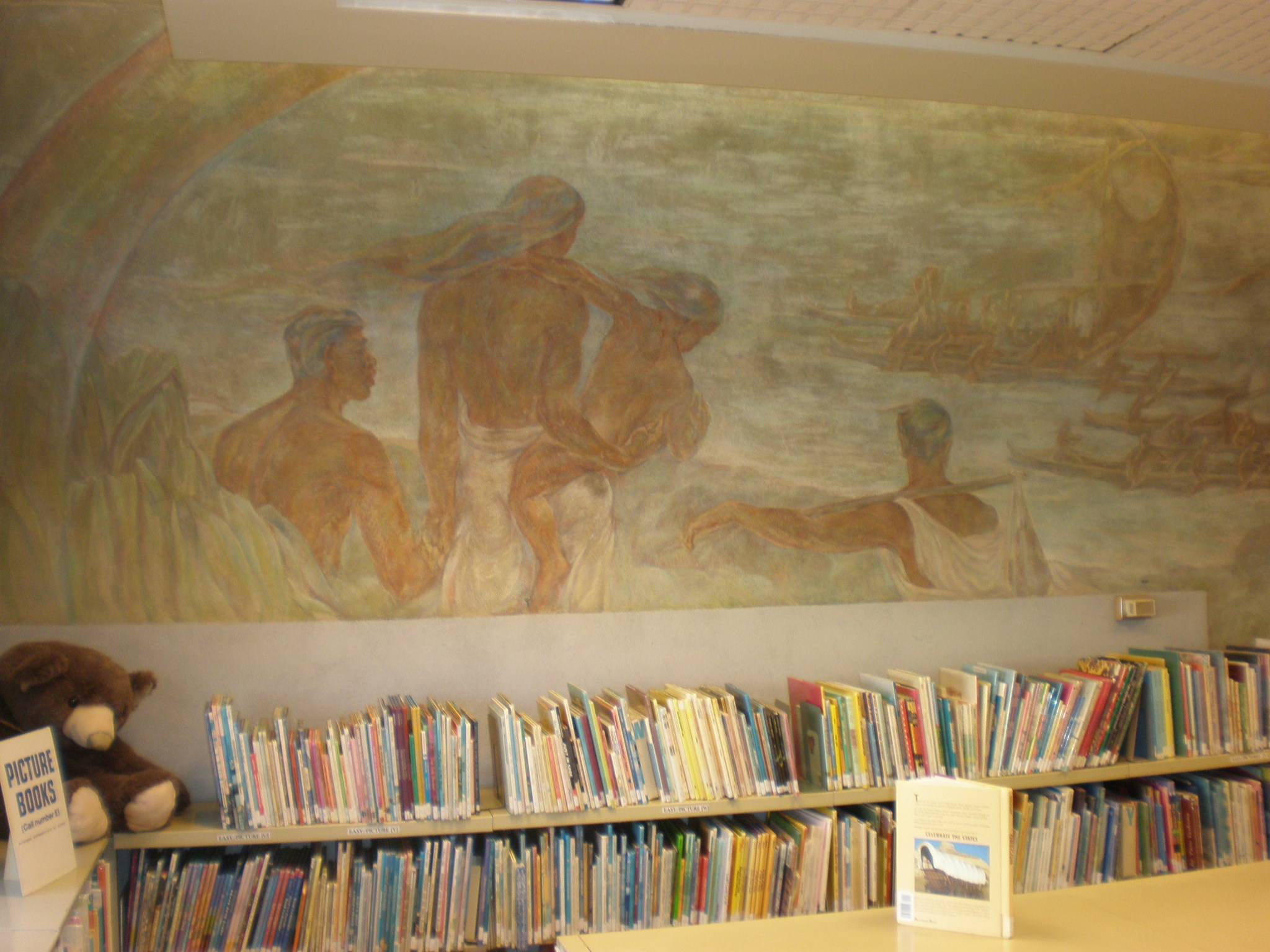
Juliette May Fraser murals in children's room

== See also ==
- List of libraries in the United States
