= Old Southeast Church (Brewster, New York) =

Historic church in New York, United States

- U.S. National Register of Historic Places
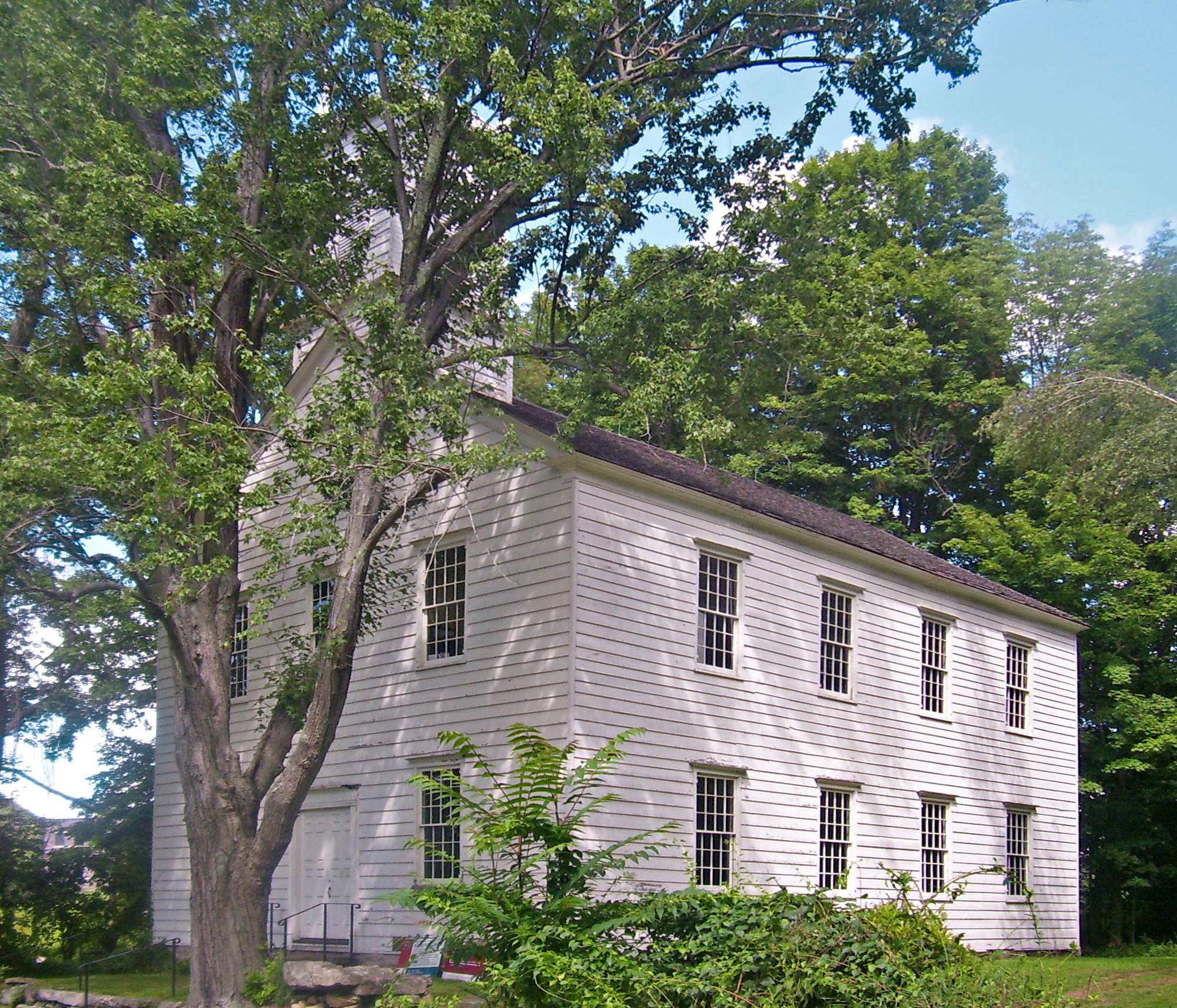
- Front (west) elevation, partially obscured by foliage, and south profile, 2008
- Location: Southeast, NY
- Nearest city: Danbury, CT
- Coordinates: 41°25′53″N 73°34′27″W
- Built: 1793-94
- NRHP reference No.: 72000903
- Added to NRHP: 1972

The Old Southeast Church is located at the end of a short dirt road leading from NY 22 in the Town of Southeast, New York, United States, a few miles north of the village of Brewster. It is a wooden building formerly used by a Presbyterian congregation. Built in the late 18th century and later modified following a fire, it is the oldest house of worship in Putnam County. Today many of its materials are intact but it is the subject of ongoing preservation efforts.

It and a small one-room schoolhouse nearby are the few remaining buildings from the former hamlet of Doanesburgh, once the commercial center of eastern Putnam County. In 1972 it was listed on the National Register of Historic Places, the first property in the county to be so listed. It is currently owned by the Landmarks Preservation Society of Southeast and is used occasionally as a cultural center.

== Building ==
The church is a two-story, three-by-four-bay building sided in white clapboard. It is regularly fenestrated with 12-over-12 double-hung sash windows in all bays. The gabled roof has a projecting steeple on the west end, right over the main entrance.

That entrance leads to a vestibule and then inside to the sanctuary. It features wainscoting beneath the chair rail as well as paneling on the gallery parapet, and painted and grained pews. The gallery and ceiling are supported by Doric columns, and the original 19th-century light fixtures.

== History ==
The first church in the area was built of logs in the late 1730s. In 1761, a small frame meeting house was built to strict standards for such buildings, measuring 50 by 38 feet (15 by 12 m) with the entrance south of the pulpit. Three decades later, in 1793, the congregation decided to expand again and was authorized to use as much or as little of the meetinghouse as necessary to build a newer building. It was completed the following year.

In 1830 the building was severely damaged in a fire. When it was rebuilt, a number of alterations were made to both interior and exterior. The entrance was moved to its present location, the belfry built and the balcony reoriented. Two brick chimneys were also dismantled and can be seen only from the inside.

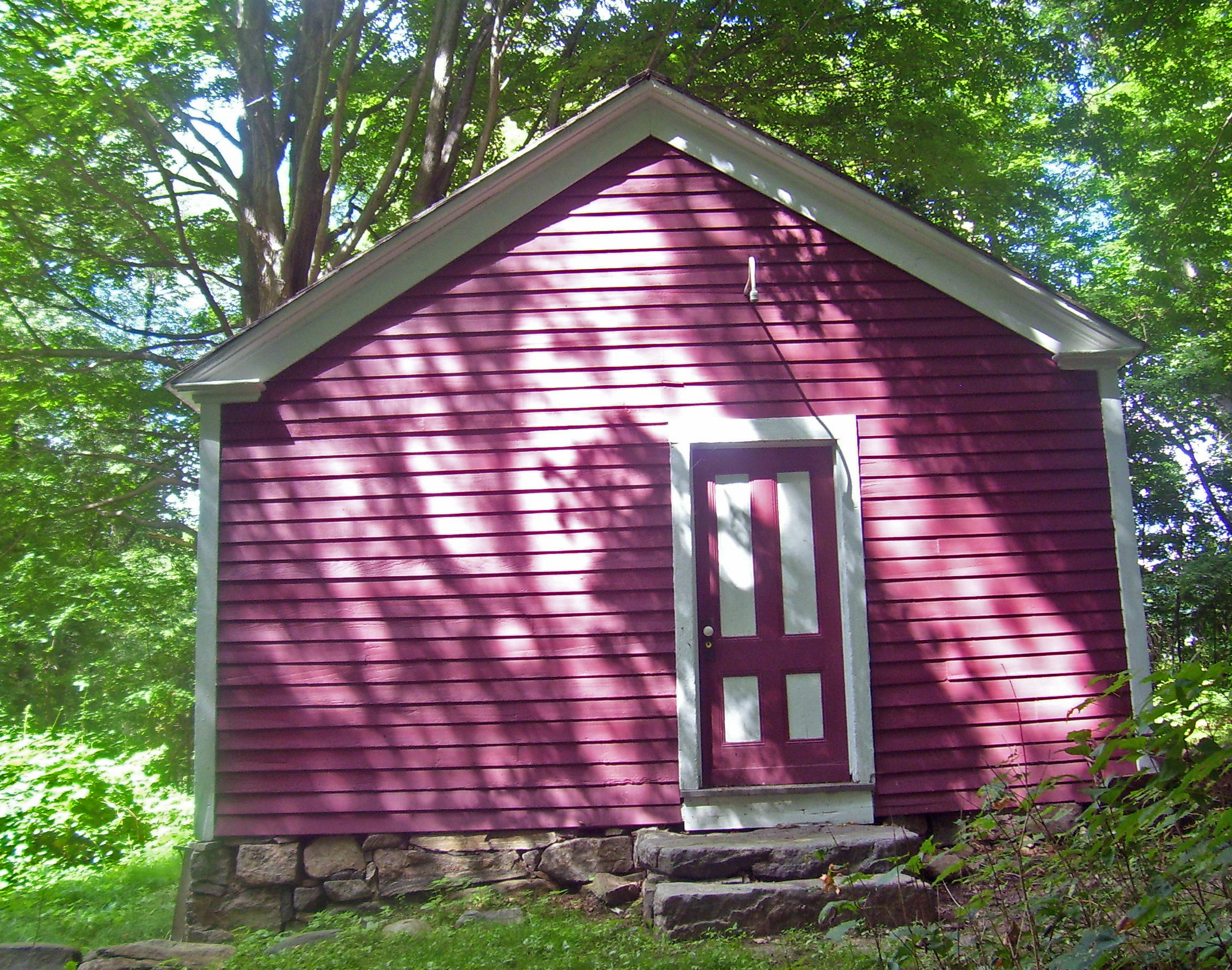
The schoolhouse

At the time it was built, the church was in the middle of the hamlet of Doanesburgh, then the commercial center of eastern Putnam County. In the mid-19th century, the New York and Harlem Railroad was built, connecting the region more directly to New York City. It chose a route that bypassed Doanesburgh for the Great Swamp, passing through Brewster, currently still in use as far north as Wassaic by Metro-North's Harlem Line. Brewster prospered and grew while Doanesburgh diminished, and the church and school are among the few remnants today.
