= Hawaiʻi State Public Library System =

Statewide public library system in Hawaii

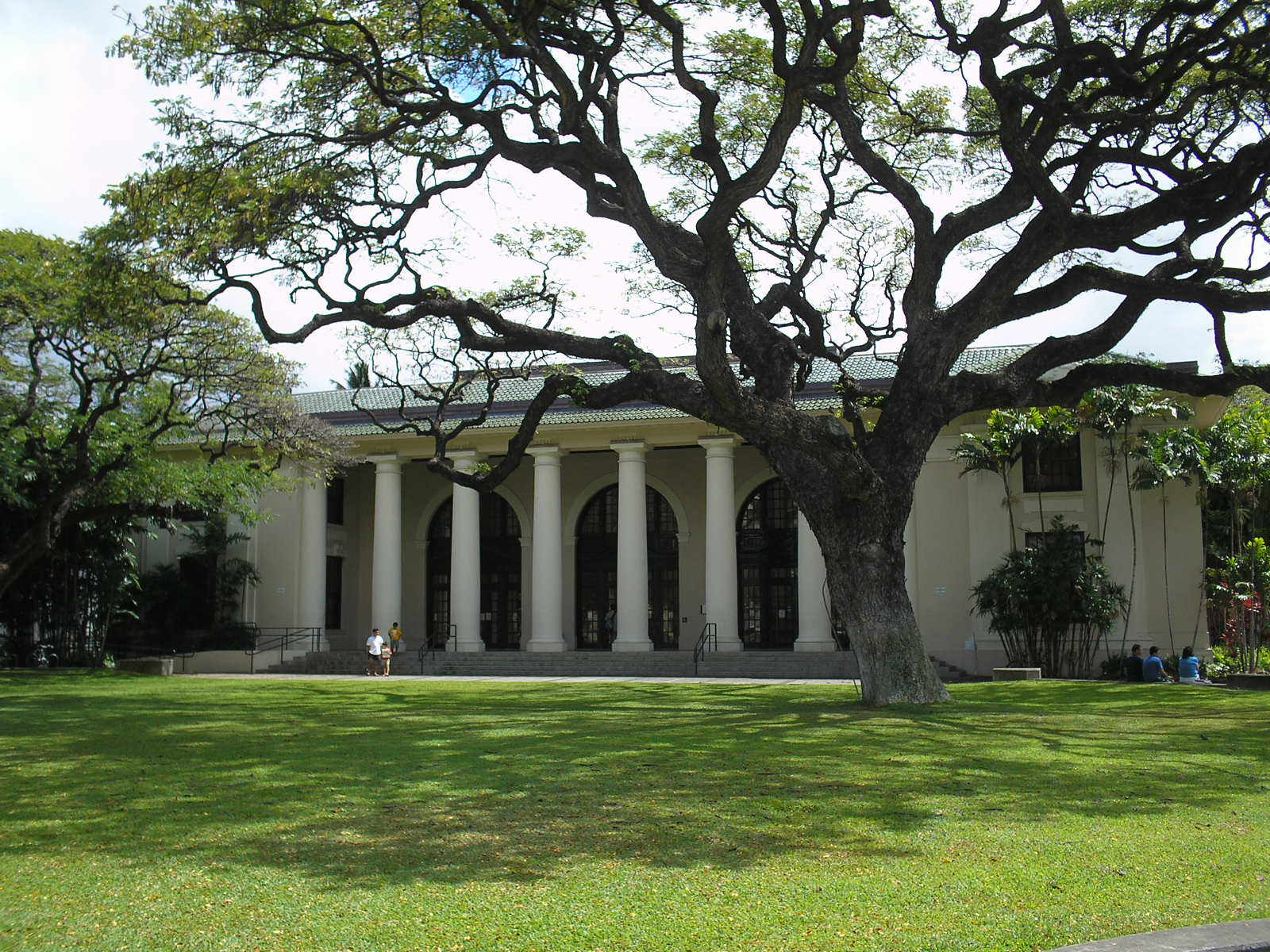
Hawaii State Library in Honolulu

The Hawaiʻi State Public Library System (HSPLS) is the only statewide public library system in the United States.

The system has 51 libraries on all the major Hawaiian Islands: Big Island of Hawaiʻi, Kauaʻi, Lānaʻi, Maui, Molokaʻi and Oʻahu. The system's collection of books and other library materials totals over three million. There is one library for the blind and physically handicapped, located on Oʻahu. The Hawaiʻi State Public Library System is headed by the Hawaiʻi State Librarian, currently Stacey Aldrich, who reports to the Hawaii Board of Education.

The flagship Hawaiʻi State Library, built in 1911 and designed by architect Henry D. Whitfield, was funded in part by industrialist and philanthropist Andrew Carnegie. It is a historic downtown Honolulu building.

== Early years ==
In 1879, the Honolulu Library and Reading Room Association was formed. The HLRRA was Hawaii's second subscription library and was supported by the Hawaiian royal family. King Kalakaua, Queen Kapionlani, Queen Emma, and Princess Bernice Pauahi Bishop gave financially and donated their personal book collections to the association. King Kalakaua gave tax exemptions and a land grant for a site in downtown Honolulu.

== First library of Hawaii ==
The Hawaii Library and Reading Room Association served the people of Hawaii for 34 years, and in 1909 signed an agreement with the trustees of the Library of Hawaii to contribute the collection of 20,000 printed materials, furnishings, and funds toward the new library. The trustees obtained a $100,000 grant from the Andrew Carnegie Foundation for the new library building. The cornerstone was laid on October 21, 1911, and the first day the library opened was February 1, 1913. The front columns identify the building as a Carnegie library, and the total cost of the building was $127,000 with the territorial legislature providing the additional $27,000. During the next 10 years the library grew rapidly, and in 1927 the legislation appropriated $300,000 to expand and renovate the original building. The expansion was designed by C.W. Dickey and included the addition of two wings creating a quadrangle with an open-air courtyard in the middle. In 1978, the building was designated a historic site and was added to the National Register of Historic Places. In 1990, the State Legislature passed funding for a second renovation. The updated building now includes air conditioning, a new roof, new plumbing, handicapped access, landscaping, and another large wing successfully blending in with the existing building.

== List of public libraries in the system ==
- Hawaiʻi County – Hawaii (island) (12)
  - North Kohala Public Library
  - Hilo Public Library
  - Honokaʻa Public Library
  - Kailua-Kona Public Library
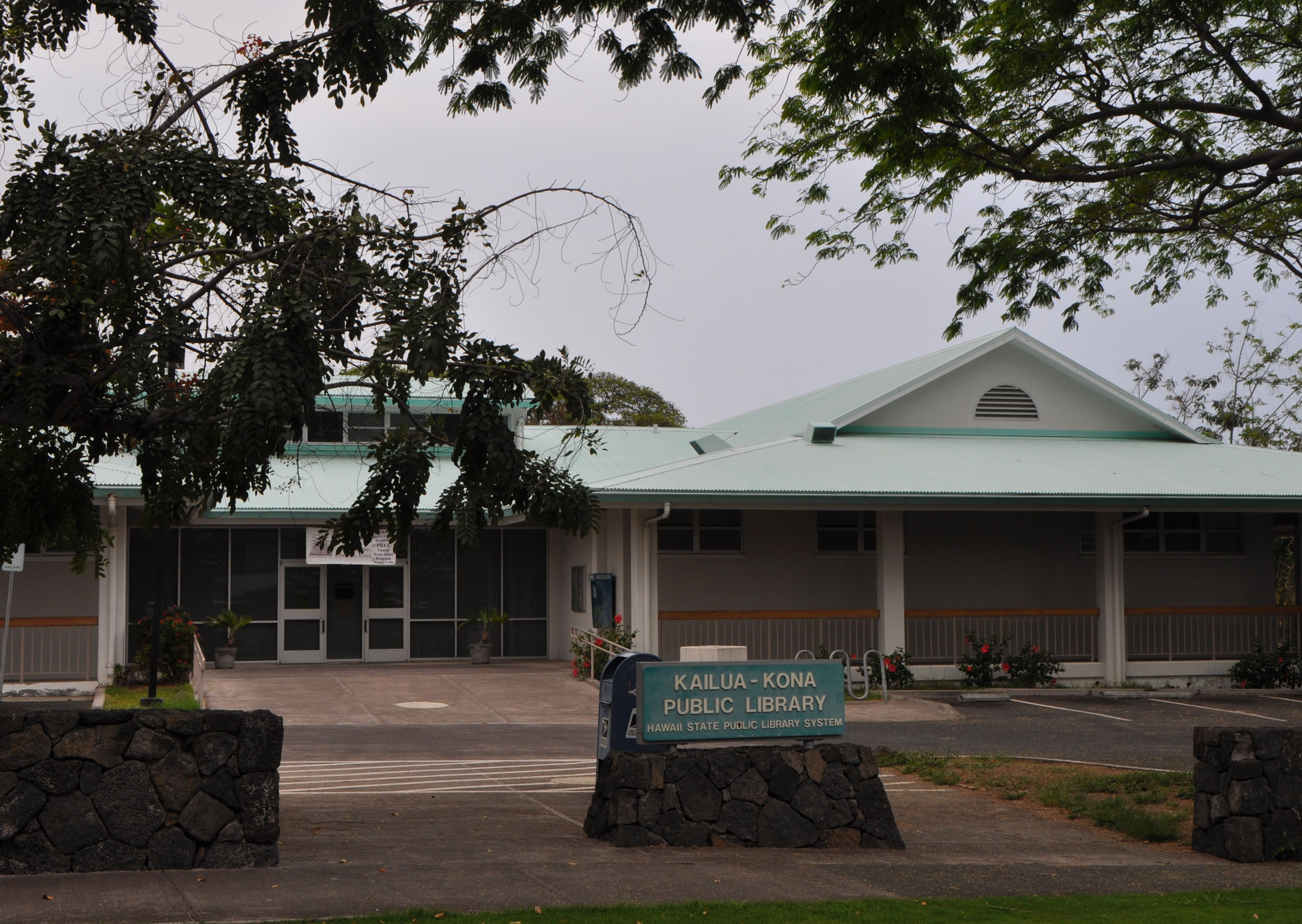
    Kailua-Kona Public Library
  - Keaʻau Public and School Library
  - Kealakekua Public Library
  - Laupāhoehoe Public and School Library
  - Mountain View Public and School Library
  - Nāʻālehu Public Library
  - Pāhala Public and School Library
  - Pāhoa Public and School Library
  - Thelma Parker Memorial Public and School Library
- Kauaʻi County (6)
  - Hanapēpē Public Library
  - Kapaʻa Public Library
  - Kōloa Public and School Library
  - Līhuʻe Public Library
  - Princeville Public Library
  - Waimea Public Library
- Maui County - Lānaʻi (1)
  - Lānaʻi Public and School Library

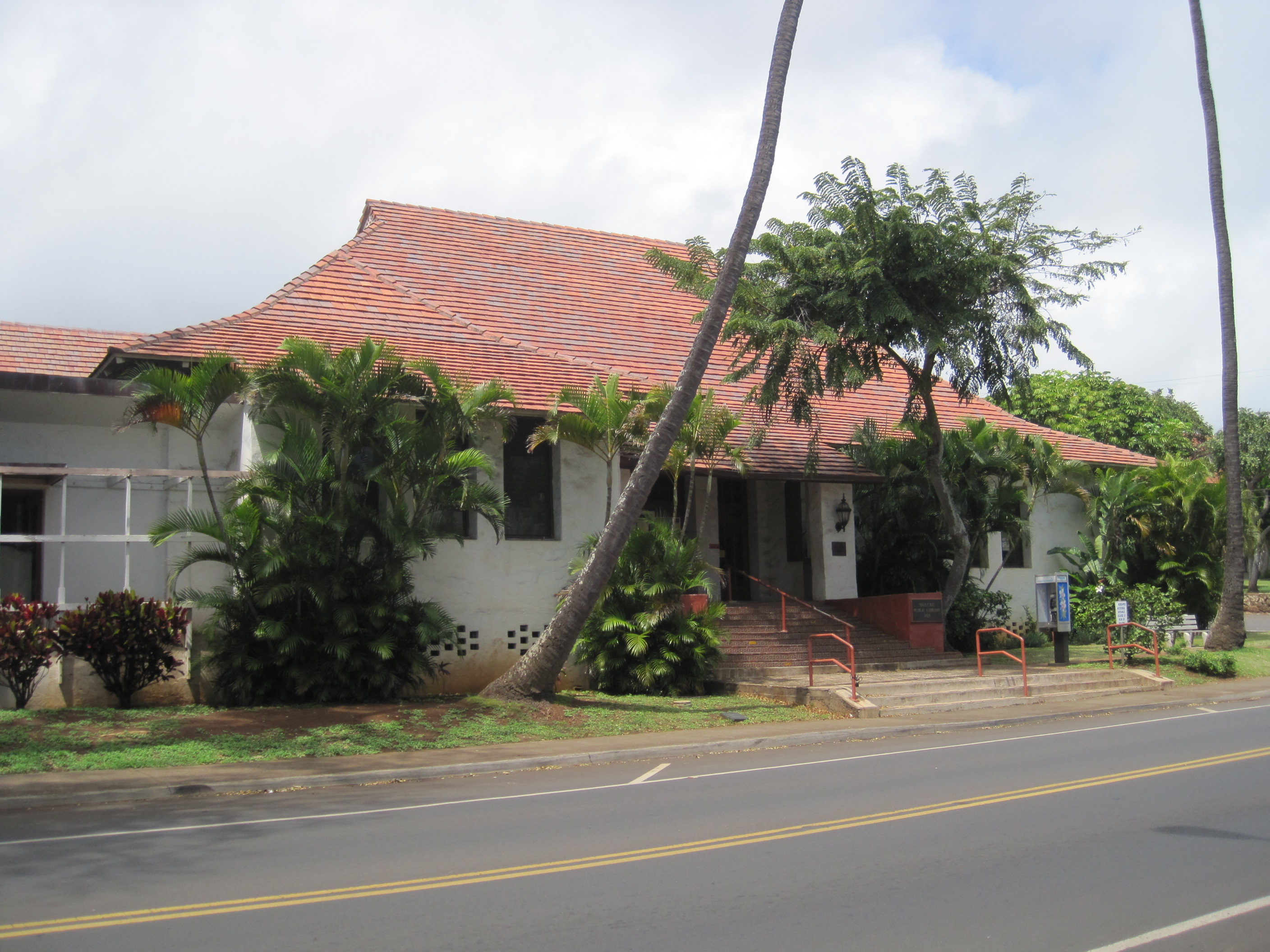
Wailuku Public Library, designed in 1928 by Charles William Dickey.

- Maui County - Maui (6)
  - Hana Public and School Library
  - Kahului Public Library
  - Kīhei Public Library
  - Lahaina Public Library
  - Makawao Public Library
  - Wailuku Public Library
- Maui County - Molokaʻi (1)
  - Molokaʻi Public Library

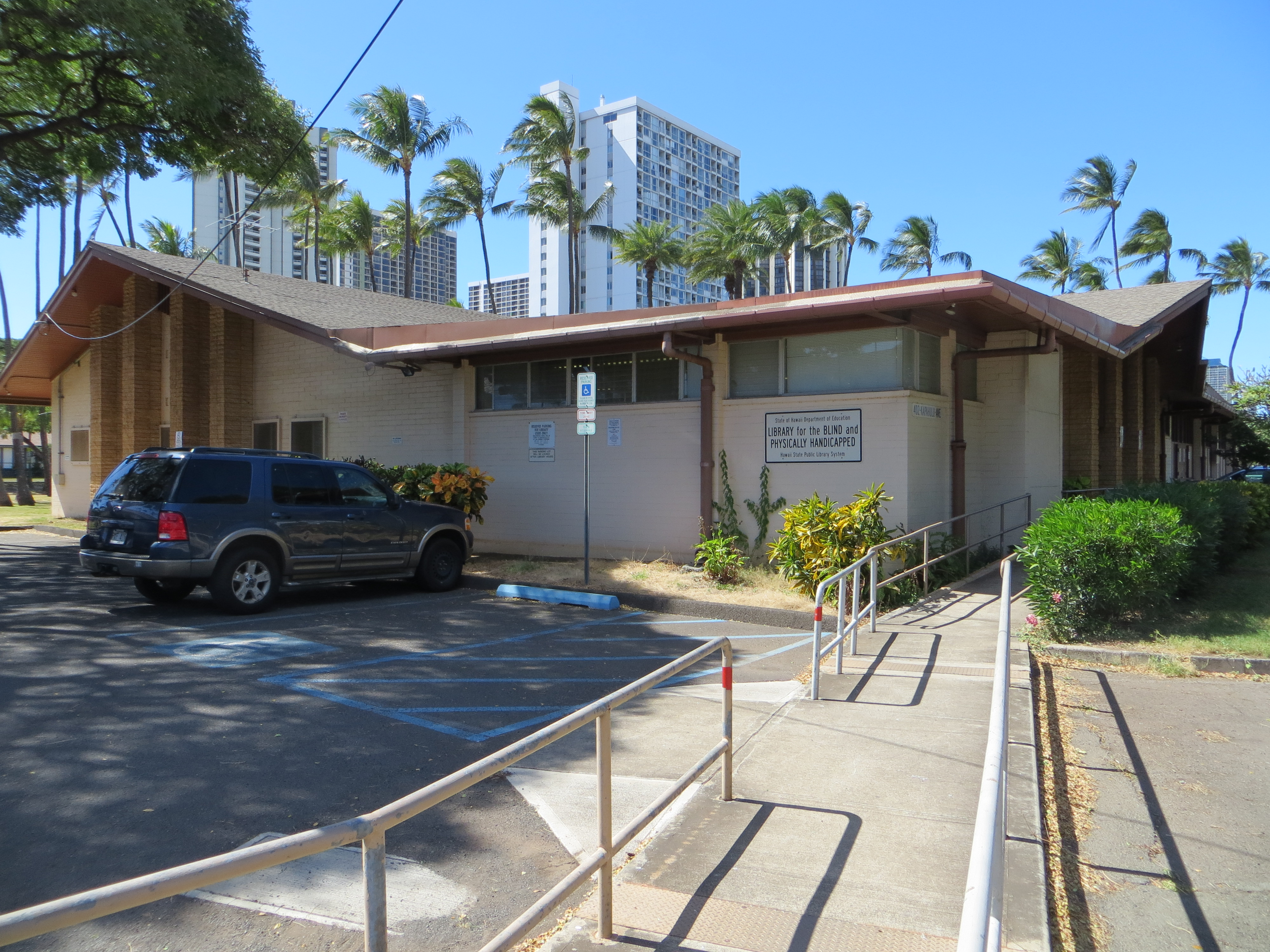
Library for the Blind and Print Disabled

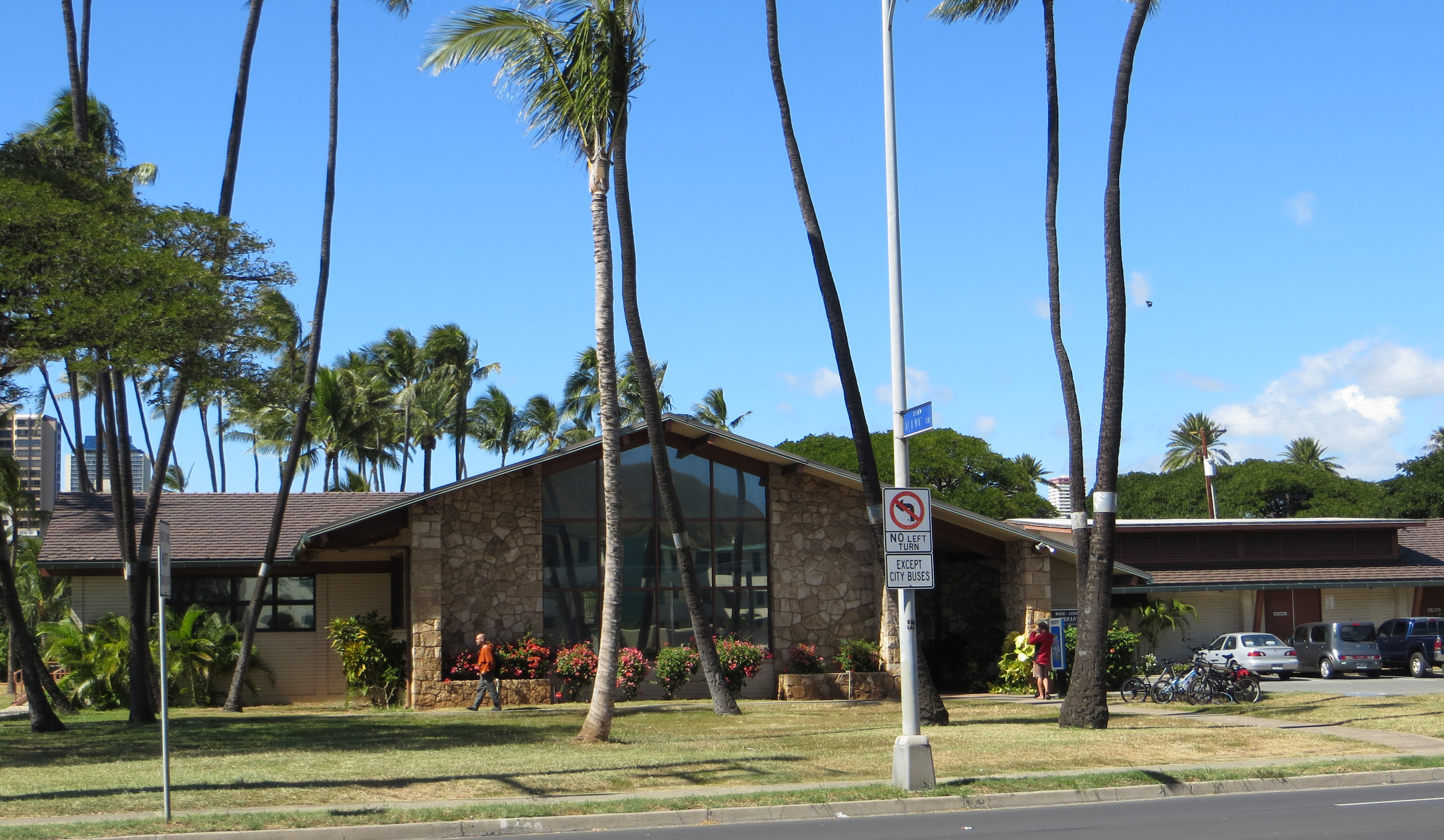
Waikiki-Kapahulu Public Library

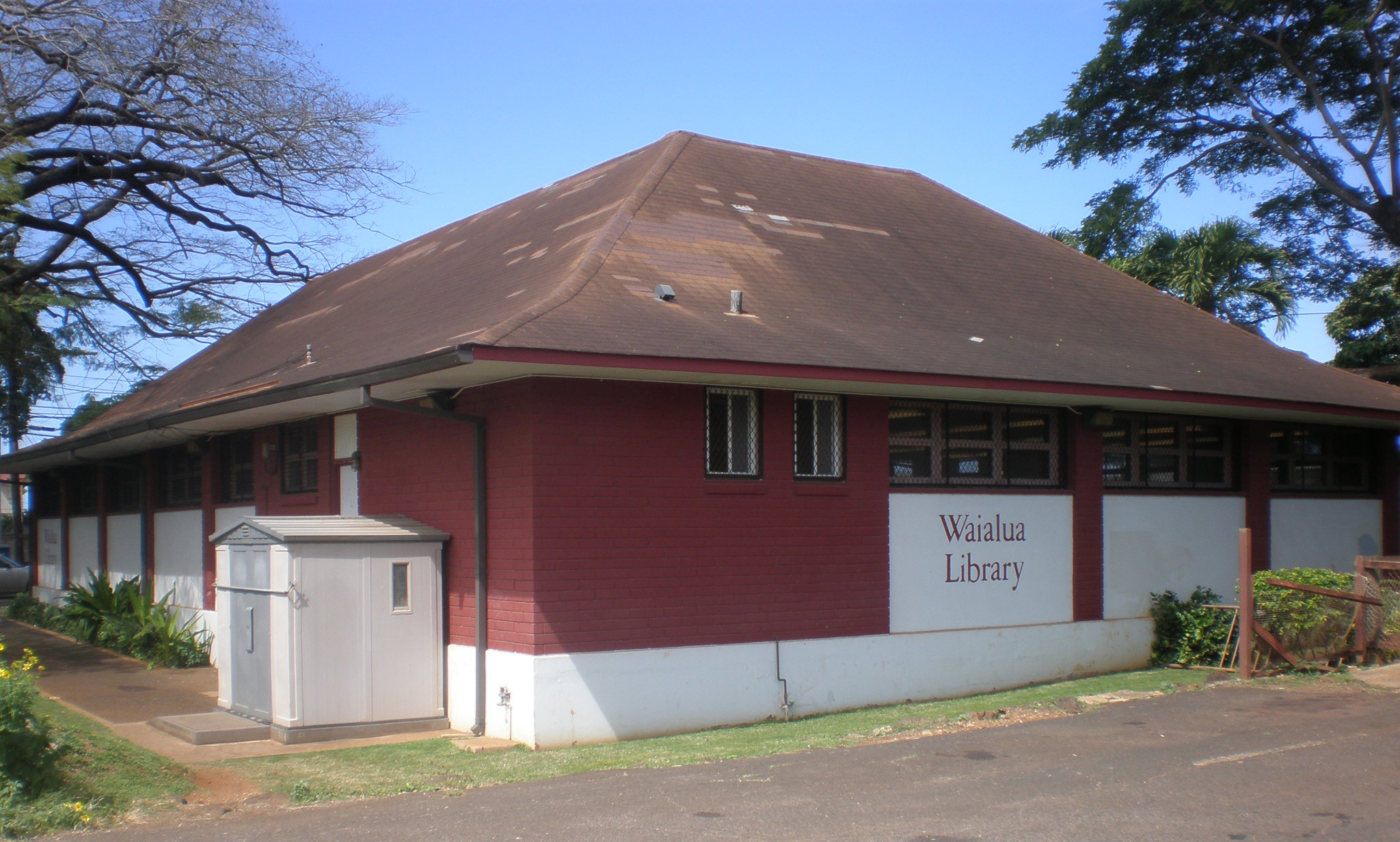
Waialua Public Library building, Waialua, HI, USA

- City and County of Honolulu – Oʻahu (25)
  - ʻAiea Public Library
  - ʻĀina Haina Public Library
  - ʻEwa Beach Public and School Library
  - Hawaiʻi Kai Public Library
  - Hawaiʻi State Library
  - Kahuku Public and School Library
  - Kailua Public Library
  - Kaimukī Public Library
  - Kalihi-Pālama Public Library
  - Kāneʻohe Public Library
  - Kapolei Public Library
  - Library for the Blind and Print Disabled
  - Liliha Public Library
  - Mānoa Public Library
  - McCully-Mōʻiliʻili Public Library
  - Mililani Public Library
  - Nānākuli Public Library
  - Pearl City Public Library
  - Salt Lake-Moanalua Public Library
  - Wahiawā Public Library
  - Waialua Public Library
  - Waiʻanae Public Library
  - Waikīkī-Kapahulu Public Library
  - Waimānalo Public & School Library
  - Waipahu Public Library
