= Chester Beach =

American sculptor (1881–1956)

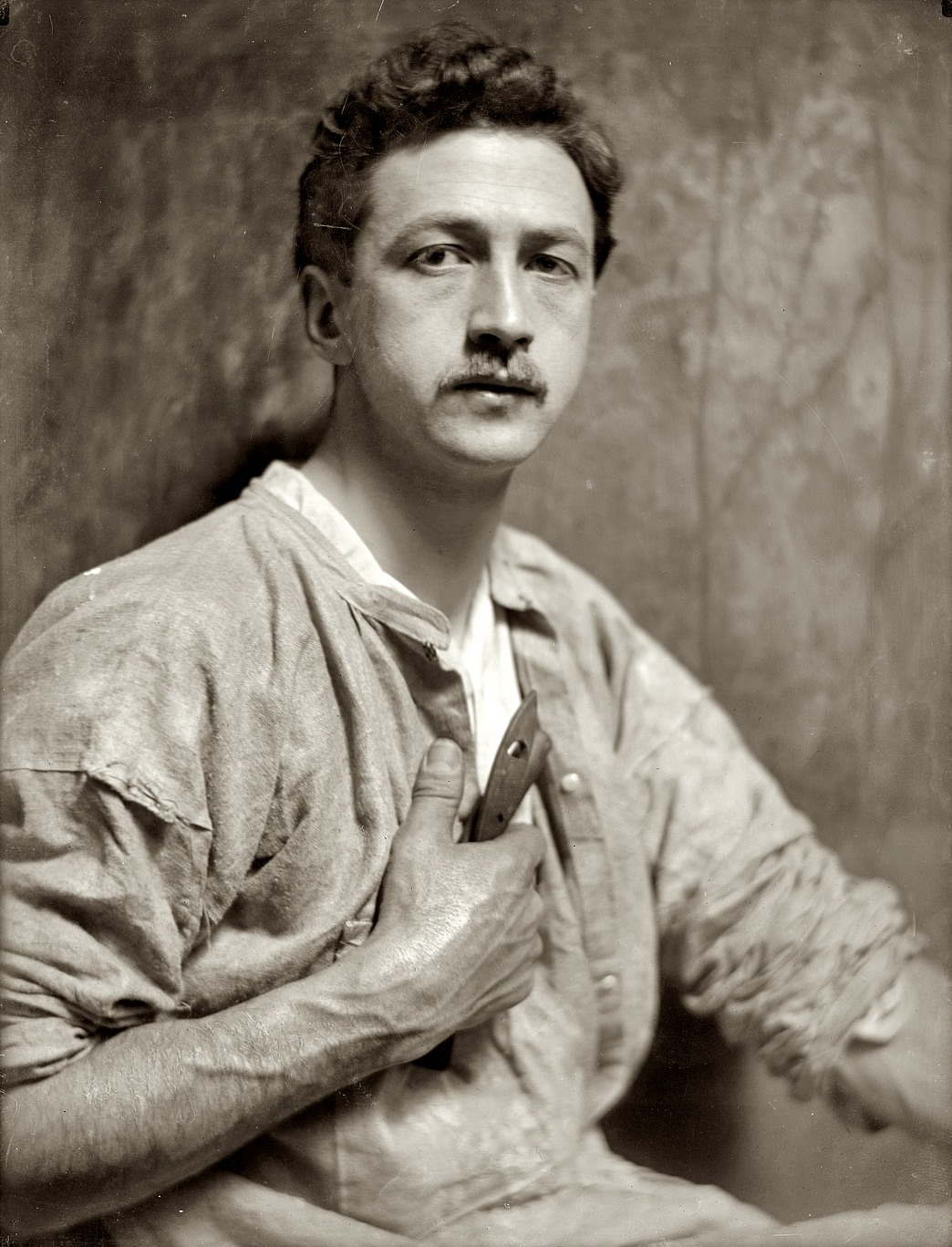
- Beach in 1910. Photo by Gertrude Käsebier.
- Born: May 23, 1881; San Francisco, California
- Died: August 6, 1956 (aged 75); Brewster, New York

Chester A. Beach (May 23, 1881 – August 6, 1956) was an American sculptor who was known for his busts and medallic art.

== Early life ==
Beach was born in San Francisco, California. He studied initially at the California School of Mechanical Arts and worked as a jewelry designer immediately afterward, while continuing his art studies at the Mark Hopkins Institute of Art. In 1903 he moved to New York City and in May 1904, he moved to Paris to study at the École des Beaux-Arts as well as under the tutelage of Raoul Verlet at the Académie Julian.

== Career ==
He returned to the U.S. in 1907 and quickly gained a following for his representations of allegorical and mythical figures. That year, he established his studio in Manhattan, which he maintained for the next forty-five years. He was soon elected to the National Sculpture Society, the Salmagundi Club and the American Numismatic Society. When he was selected to join the National Academy of Design, he was the youngest member at the time. He was also later selected for the National Institute of Arts and Letters.

In 1910, Beach married Eleanor Hollis Murdock, whom he had met while in France. The couple settled in Rome for two years, returning to the U.S. in 1912 with their first daughter Beata (later a painter married to Vernon Porter). Daughters Eleanor and Natalie were born in America. His first major commission came in 1915, when he designed three statues for the Panama-Pacific International Exposition, for which he received a silver medal. His 1919 submission for a medal commemorating the Treaty of Versailles was selected as the winner by the American Numismatic Society. He engraved the Hawaii Sesquicentennial half dollar, which was designed by Juliette May Fraser and issued in 1928, and designed the 1935 commemorative Hudson Sesquicentennial half dollar. His best-known busts are found in the New York University Hall of Fame. His work was also part of the sculpture event in the art competition at the 1928 Summer Olympics.

A prolific worker, Beach exhibited works yearly without fail at the National Academy of Design winter and annual exhibitions from 1907 to 1926. He was president of the National Sculpture Society from 1926 to 1927 and also taught at the Beaux-Arts Institute of Design and the Grand Central School of Art. He received the Numismatic Society's Saltus Medal in 1946 for his medallic work. In 1917 Beach built a studio in Brewster, New York on 10 acres (40,000 m^{2}) of land he acquired in trade from a local farmer for two sculptures. A year later he built a home for his family of stone from the old stone walls on the property. This became known as "Old Walls". He built an additional cottage on the property in 1947 known as "The Camp". Beach died on August 6, 1956, in Brewster, New York.

== Gallery of works ==
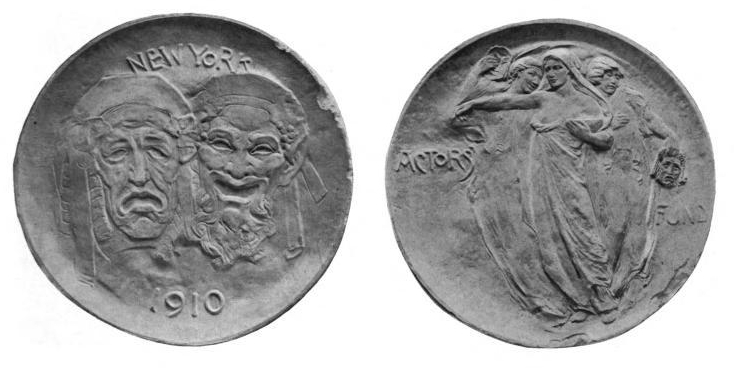
Actors Fund Medal of Honor (1910)

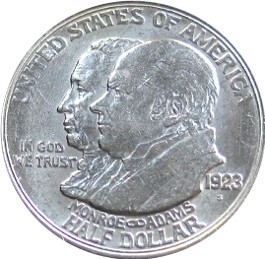
Monroe Doctrine Centennial half dollar (1923)

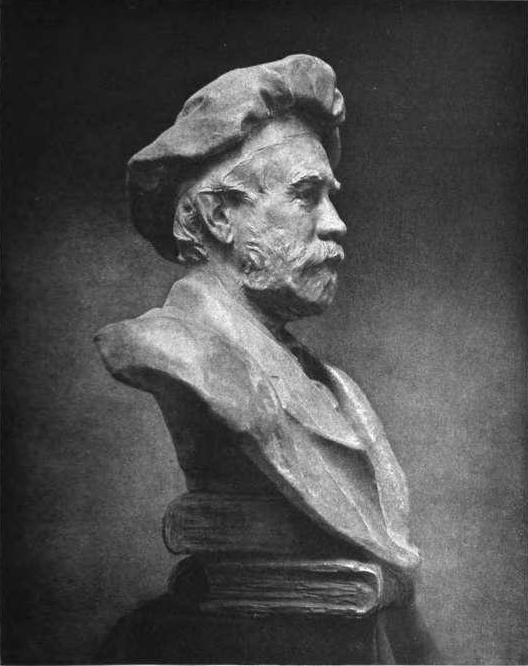
Bust of Theodore Low De Vinne

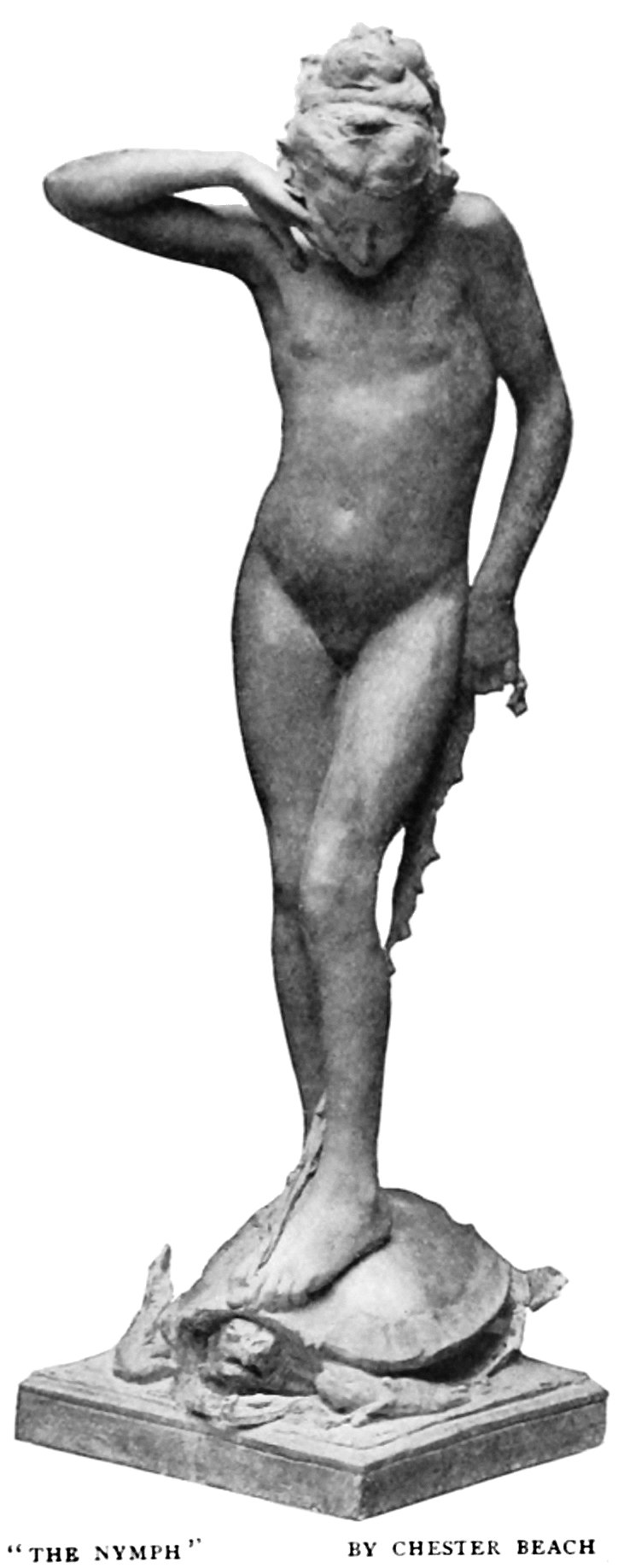
The Nymph

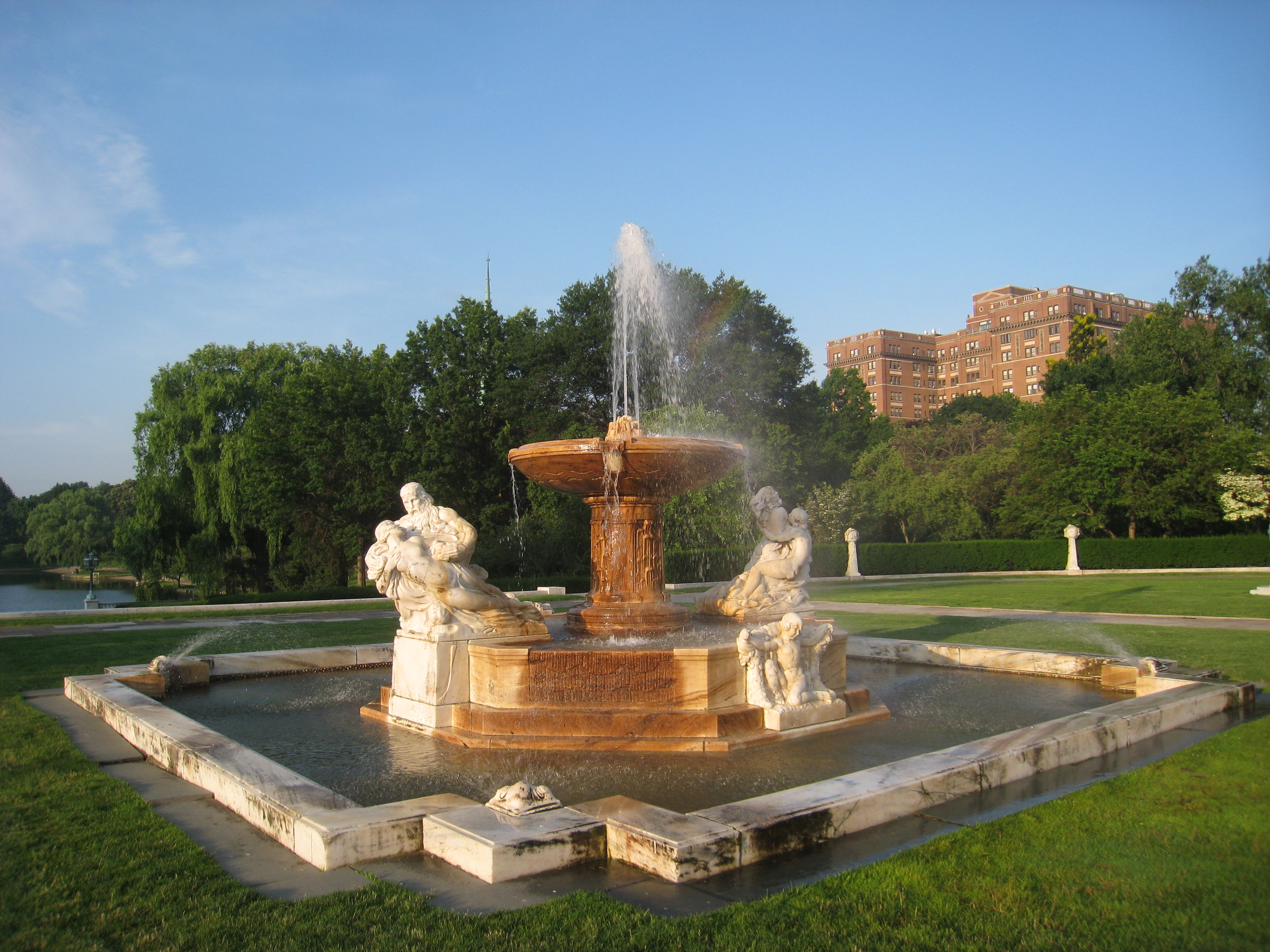
Fountain of the Waters, Cleveland Museum of Art
