= Vernon Carroll Porter =

American artist (1896–1982)

Vernon Carroll Porter (1896–1982) was an American artist, born in Cleveland, Ohio. He studied at the Art Students League, Grand Central School Academy, the Mechanics Institute, and Brooklyn Polytechnic Institute and was known for his surreal landscape oil paintings.

== Live ==
As chairman of the Artists Aid Committee, Porter started the Washington Square Outdoor Art Exhibit in 1931, with the objective of helping artists survive the Great Depression. The first exhibit, which lasted nine days, was limited to 10 artists who lived in New York. Most of the group lived below 14th Street, with the remainder residing in Brooklyn. The exhibit has since been reorganized into a nonprofit corporation for stimulating, promoting and preserving contemporary American art. The Washington Square Outdoor Art Exhibit, in the heart of Greenwich Village, has become a major annual tourist attraction while it continues to provide an exhibit area for upcoming new artists to meet with gallery owners, critics, and collectors.

From 1938 to 1947, Porter was Director of the Riverside Museum.

Porter was married to Beata Beach, painter, designer, illustrator, and etcher. She was a daughter of sculptor Chester Beach.

Porter was living in Putnam Valley, New York when he suffered a stroke and died in Peekskill Community Hospital, Peekskill, New York, August 31, 1982. His wife, Beata Porter, died in August 2007.
