= List of places in Hawaii =

Map of the United States with Hawaii highlighted

This is a list of census-designated places in Hawaii. There are no separately incorporated cities in the entire state; Honolulu County is both a city and county, and it is the sole entity considered by the U.S. Census Bureau as a municipality. There are 162 census-designated places as of the 2020 census.

== Cities, towns and villages of Hawaii ==
† County seat
†† State capital and county seat

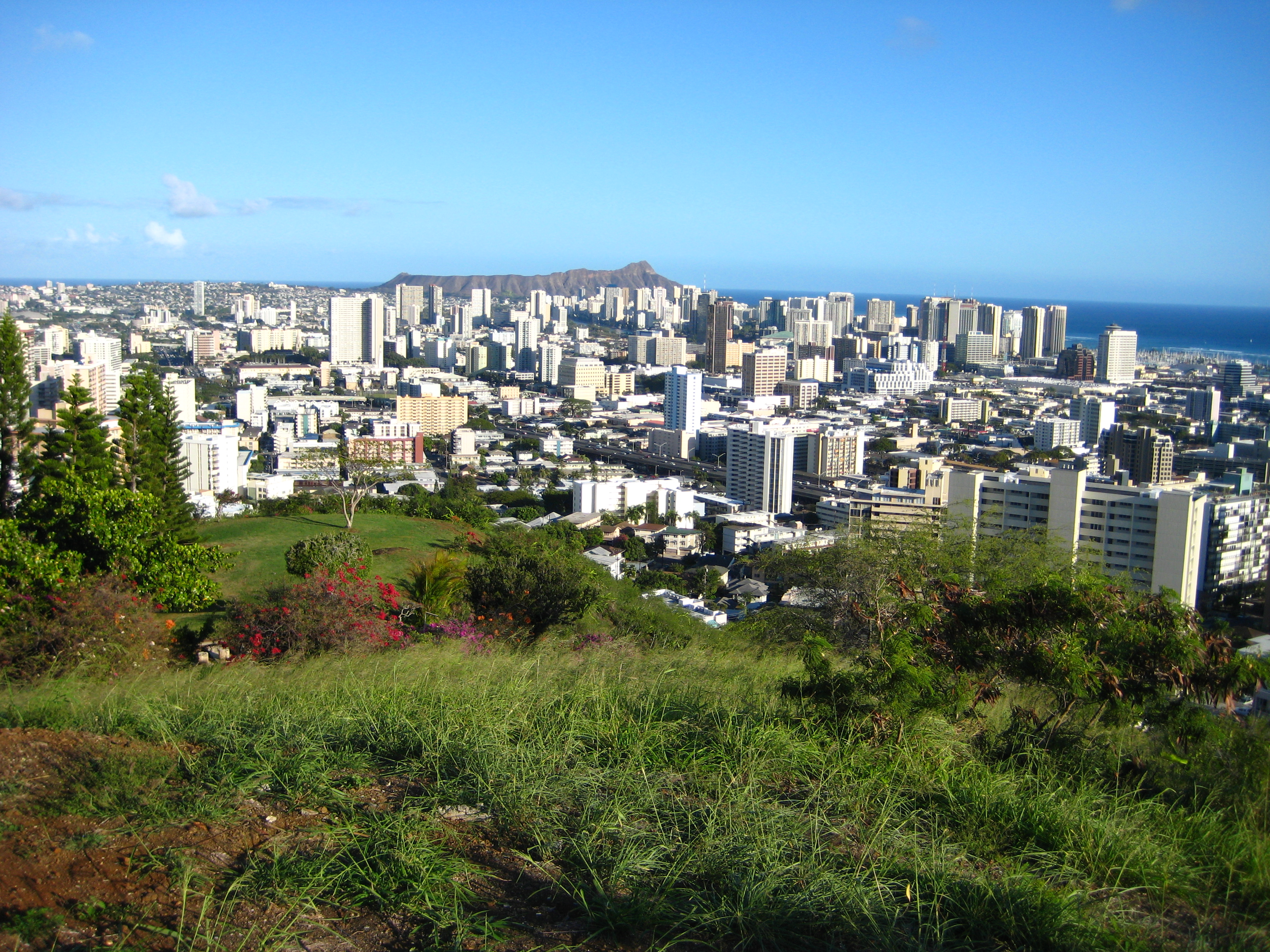
Honolulu, Capital of Hawaii

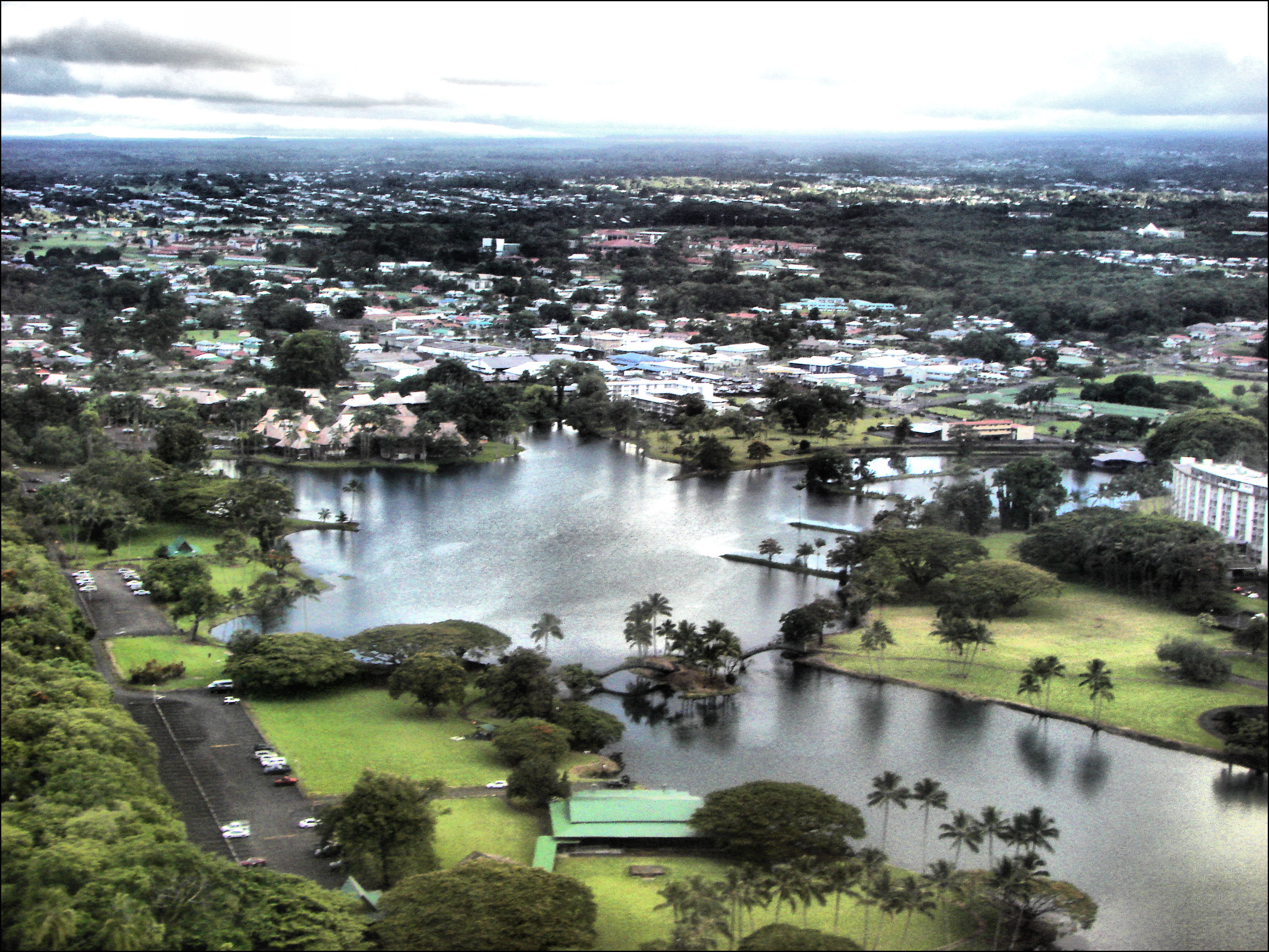
Hilo

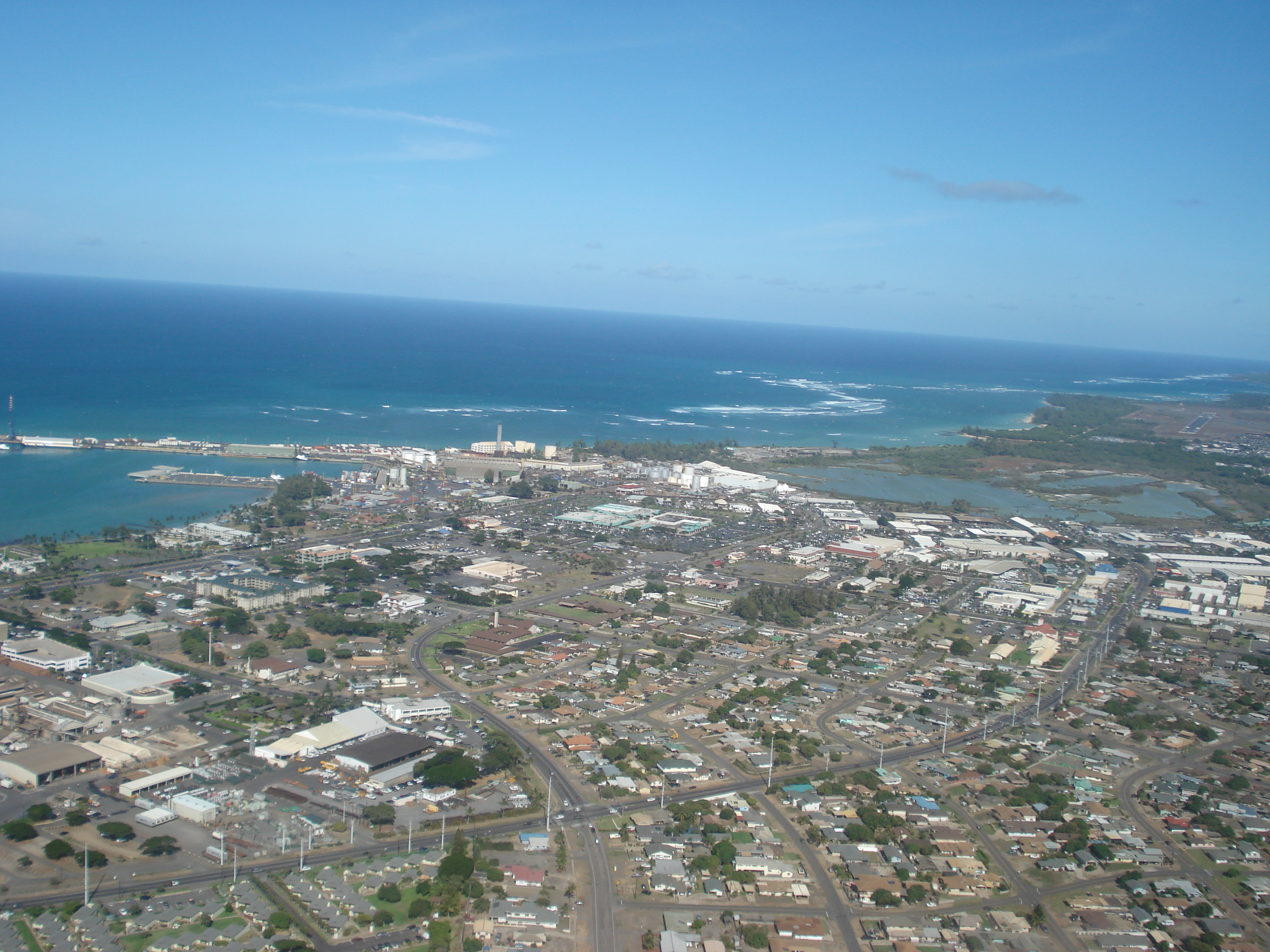
Kahului

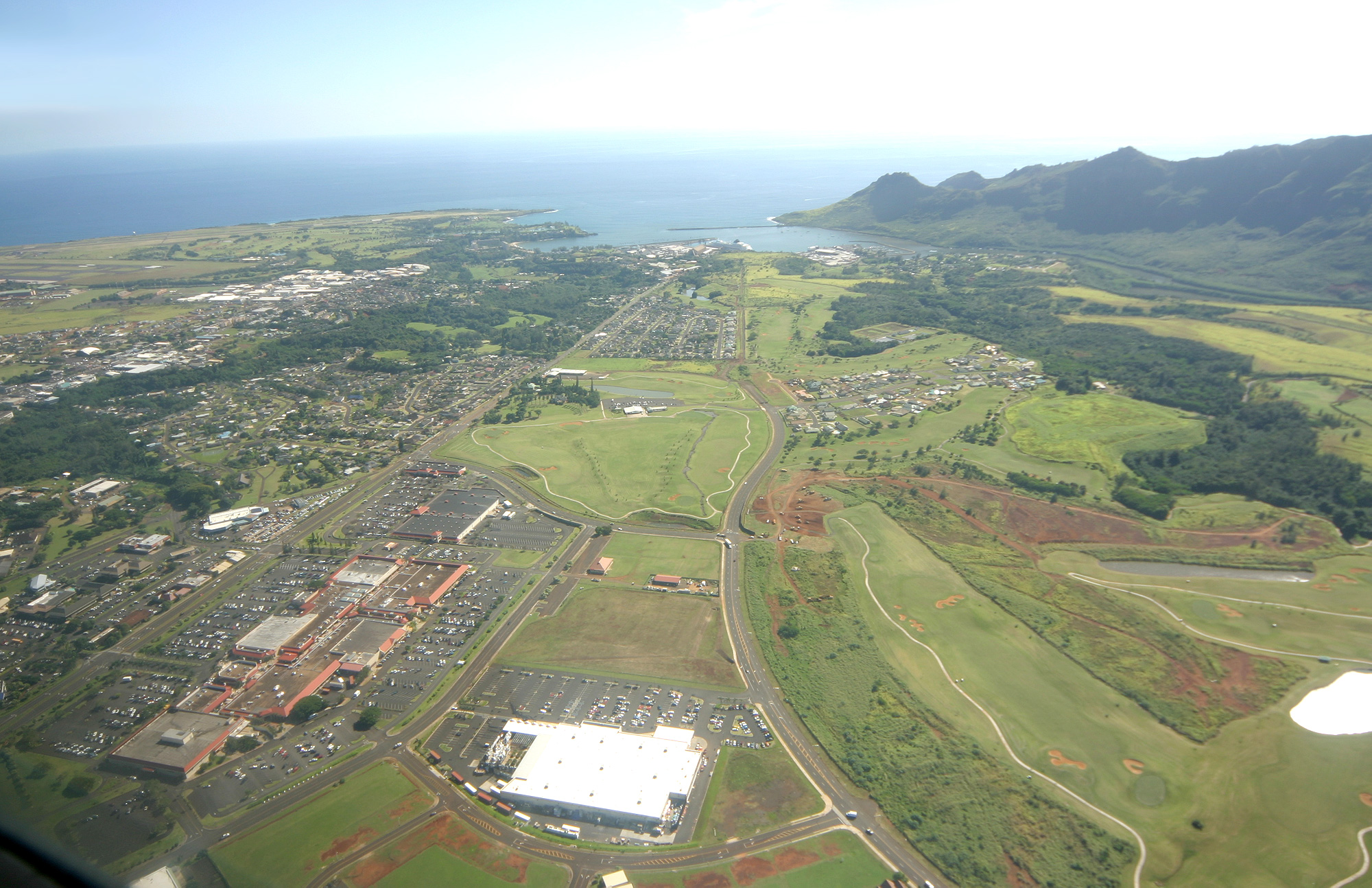
Lihue

Rank	Name	Population (2020)	County
1	Honolulu ††	350,964	Honolulu
2	East Honolulu	50,922	Honolulu
3	Pearl City	45,295	Honolulu
4	Hilo †	44,186	Hawaii
5	Waipahu	43,485	Honolulu
6	Kailua	40,514	Honolulu
7	Kaneohe	37,430	Honolulu
8	Kahului	28,219	Maui
9	Mililani Town	28,121	Honolulu
10	Ewa Gentry	25,707	Honolulu
11	Kihei	21,423	Maui
12	Kapolei	21,411	Honolulu
13	Mililani Mauka	21,075	Honolulu
14	Makakilo	19,877	Honolulu
15	Kailua-Kona	19,713	Hawaii
16	Wahiawa	18,658	Honolulu
17	Wailuku †	17,697	Maui
18	Ewa Beach	16,415	Honolulu
19	Halawa	15,016	Honolulu
20	Ocean Pointe	14,965	Honolulu
21	Hawaiian Paradise Park	14,957	Hawaii
22	Schofield Barracks	14,904	Honolulu
23	Royal Kunia	14,896	Honolulu
24	Waimalu	13,817	Honolulu
25	Waianae	13,614	Honolulu
26	Lahaina	12,702	Maui
27	Kaiminani	12,590	Hawaii
28	Nanakuli	12,195	Honolulu
29	Waipio	12,082	Honolulu
30	Kapaa	11,652	Kauaʻi
31	Maili	11,535	Honolulu
32	Aiea	10,408	Honolulu
33	Makaha	9,916	Honolulu
34	Waimea	9,904	Hawaii
35	Kaneohe Station	9,483	Honolulu
36	Waihee-Waiehu	9,234	Maui
37	Ahuimanu	8,969	Honolulu
38	Haiku-Pauwela	8,595	Maui
39	Pukalani	8,299	Maui
40	Lihue †	8,004	Kauaʻi
41	Ewa Villages	7,825	Honolulu
42	Hickam Housing	7,581	Honolulu
43	Waikele	7,509	Honolulu
44	Makawao	7,297	Maui
45	Waikoloa Village	7,104	Hawaii
46	Napili-Honokowai	7,042	Maui
47	Kula	6,942	Maui
48	Waimanalo	6,057	Honolulu
49	Wailea	6,027	Maui
50	Laie	5,963	Honolulu
51	Wailua Homesteads	5,863	Kauaʻi
52	Waipio Acres	5,531	Honolulu
53	East Kapolei	5,299	Honolulu
54	West Loch Estate	5,523	Honolulu
55	Kahaluu	5,241	Honolulu
56	Pupukea	5,130	Honolulu
57	Heeia	5,001	Honolulu
58	Kalaheo	4,996	Kauaʻi
59	Hanamaulu	4,994	Kauaʻi
60	Haleiwa	4,941	Honolulu
61	Whitmore Village	4,887	Honolulu
62	Hawaiian Ocean View	4,864	Hawaii
63	Waimanalo Beach	4,823	Honolulu
64	Kahaluu-Keauhou	4,778	Hawaii
65	Iroquois Point	4,549	Honolulu
66	Mountain View	4,215	Hawaii
67	Waialua	4,062	Honolulu
68	Hauula	4,018	Honolulu
69	Hawaiian Beaches	3,976	Hawaii
70	Kekaha	3,715	Kauaʻi
71	Ainaloa	3,609	Hawaii
72	Waikapu	3,437	Maui
73	Hawaiian Acres	3,426	Hawaii
74	Kaunakakai	3,419	Maui
75	Puhi	3,380	Kauaʻi
76	Lanai City	3,332	Maui
77	Captain Cook	3,253	Hawaii
78	Orchidlands Estates	3,165	Hawaii
79	Kilauea	3,014	Kauaʻi
80	Holualoa	2,994	Hawaii
81	Kahuku	2,852	Honolulu
82	Honokaa	2,699	Hawaii
83	Hanapepe	2,678	Kauaʻi
84	Lawai	2,578	Kauaʻi
85	Helemano	2,549	Honolulu
86	Eleele	2,515	Kauaʻi
87	Kurtistown	2,515	Hawaii
88	Paia	2,470	Maui
89	Honaunau-Napoopoo	2,416	Hawaii
90	Wheeler AFB	2,412	Honolulu
91	Kalaeloa	2,364	Honolulu
92	Wailua	2,359	Kauaʻi
93	Kealakekua	2,307	Hawaii
94	Hawi	2,268	Hawaii
95	Anahola	2,243	Kauaʻi
96	Koloa	2,231	Kauaʻi
97	Keokea	2,199	Maui
98	Princeville	2,157	Kauaʻi
99	Kualapuu	2,110	Maui
100	Waimea	2,057	Kauaʻi
101	Maunawili	2,026	Honolulu
102	Kapaau	2,008	Hawaii
103	Ko Olina	1,999	Honolulu
104	Fern Acres	1,965	Hawaii
105	Pepeekeo	1,826	Hawaii
106	Mokuleia	1,816	Honolulu
107	Nanawale Estates	1,652	Hawaii
108	Hana	1,526	Maui
109	Kaaawa	1,421	Honolulu
110	Pahala	1,403	Hawaii
111	Eden Roc	1,386	Hawaii
112	Punaluu	1,374	Honolulu
113	Omao	1,346	Kauaʻi
114	Kaloko	1,314	Hawaii
115	Poipu	1,299	Kauaʻi
116	Keaau	1,195	Hawaii
117	Olinda	1,188	Maui
118	Discovery Harbour	1,171	Hawaii
119	Papaikou	1,166	Hawaii
120	Kaanapali	1,161	Maui
121	Fern Forest	1,150	Hawaii
122-T	Wainaku	1,147	Hawaii
122-T	Laupahoehoe	1,147	Hawaii
124	Leilani Estates	1,139	Hawaii
125	Haliimaile	1,074	Maui
126	Honalo	996	Hawaii
127	Pahoa	924	Hawaii
128	Mahinahina	880	Maui
129	Naalehu	811	Hawaii
130	Royal Hawaiian Estates	790	Hawaii
131	Halaula	773	Hawaii
132	Waikoloa Beach Resort	757	Hawaii
133	Volcano	736	Hawaii
134	Waikane	728	Honolulu
135	Launiupoko	688	Maui
136	Kaumakani	672	Kauaʻi
137	Paauilo	618	Hawaii
138	Tiki Gardens	555	Hawaii
139	Haena	550	Kauaʻi
140	Seaview	512	Hawaii
141	Kapalua	495	Maui
142	Honomu	452	Hawaii
143	Hanalei	444	Kauaʻi
144	Maunaloa	435	Maui
145	Paukaa	434	Hawaii
146	Wainiha	419	Kauaʻi
147	Black Sands	416	Hawaii
148	Ualapu'e	393	Maui
149	Volcano Golf Course	363	Hawaii
150	Kalihiwai	361	Kauaʻi
151	Kawela Bay	325	Honolulu
152	Maalaea	310	Maui
153	Pakala Village	286	Kauaʻi
154	Kukuihaele	281	Hawaii
155	Puako	267	Hawaii
156-T	Makaha Valley	198	Honolulu
156-T	Waiohinu	198	Hawaii
158	Makena	196	Maui
159	Kalapana	167	Hawaii
160	Kamāʻili	157	Hawaii
161	Olowalu	100	Maui
162	Manele	7	Maui

== See also ==
- List of counties in Hawaii
- Landforms of Hawaii (bays, mountains, etc.)
