= List of Hawaii locations by per capita income =

Hawaii has the eighteenth highest per capita income in the United States of America, at $21,525 (2000). Its personal per capita income is $46,034 (2014). The information is represented in the table below.

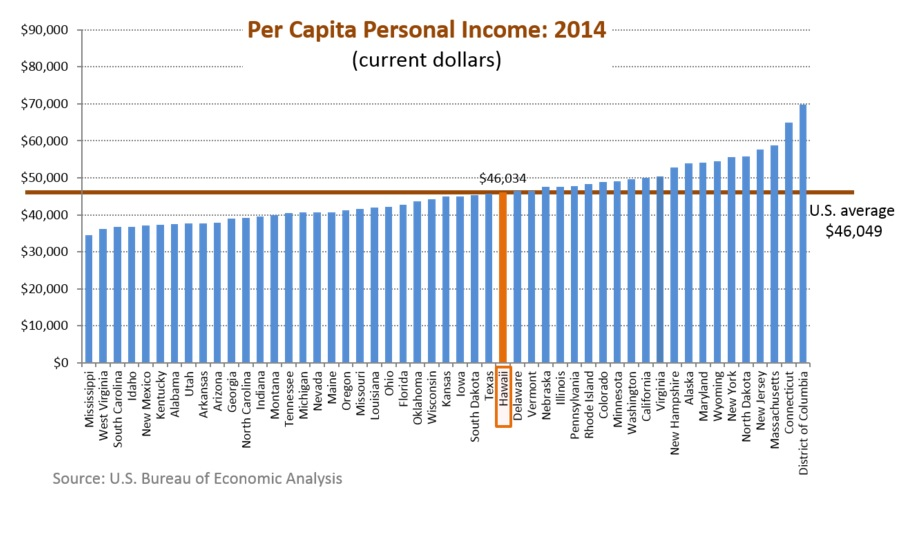

== Hawaii counties ranked by per capita income ==
Note: Data is from the 2010 United States Census Data and the 2006-2010 American Community Survey 5-Year Estimates.

| Rank | County | Per capita income | Median household income | Median family income | Population | Number of households |
|---|---|---|---|---|---|---|
| 1 | Kalawao | $43,308 | $41,806 | $79,500 | 90 | 69 |
| 2 | Honolulu | $29,516 | $70,093 | $81,370 | 953,207 | 311,047 |
| 3 | Maui | $29,180 | $63,989 | $74,465 | 154,834 | 53,886 |
| | Hawaii | $28,882 | $66,420 | $77,245 | 1,360,301 | 455,338 |
| | United States | $27,334 | $51,914 | $62,982 | 308,745,538 | 116,716,292 |
| 4 | Kauaʻi | $26,513 | $62,531 | $71,847 | 67,091 | 23,240 |
| 5 | Hawaii | $26,194 | $54,996 | $66,348 | 185,079 | 67,096 |

== Hawaii places ranked by per capita income ==
| Rank | Place | County | Per Capita Income | Median House- hold Income | Population | Number of Households |
|---|---|---|---|---|---|---|
| 1 | Kapalua | Maui County | $75,992 | $57,292 | 467 | 186 |
| 2 | Puako | Hawaii County | $63,857 | $60,250 | 772 | 215 |
| 3 | Kaanapali | Maui County | $48,506 | $79,288 | 1,375 | 537 |
| 4 | Maalaea | Maui County | $43,571 | $53,750 | 454 | 263 |
| 5 | Princeville | Kauaʻi County | $37,971 | $63,833 | 1,698 | 752 |
| 6 | Kalihiwai | Kauai County | $37,062 | $42,083 | 717 | 280 |
| 7 | Poipu | Kauai County | $35,800 | $51,442 | 1,075 | 472 |
| 8 | He'eia | Honolulu County | $33,990 | $87,528 | 4,944 | 1,557 |
| 9 | Kahaluu-Keauhou | Hawaii County | $33,067 | $52,522 | 2,414 | 1,000 |
| 10 | Maunawili | Honolulu County | $30,551 | $82,148 | 4,869 | 1,458 |
| 11 | Kailua | Honolulu County | $29,299 | $72,784 | 36,513 | 12,229 |
| 12 | Kawela Bay | Honolulu County | $28,481 | $49,167 | 410 | 189 |
| 13 | Waimalu | Honolulu County | $25,913 | $61,210 | 29,371 | 10,524 |
| 14 | Pūpūkea | Honolulu County | $25,682 | $56,146 | 4,250 | 1,455 |
| 15 | Ahuimanu | Honolulu County | $25,381 | $71,732 | 8,506 | 2,591 |
| 16 | Holualoa | Hawaii County | $25,222 | $50,492 | 6,107 | 2,383 |
| 17 | Aiea | Honolulu County | $25,111 | $71,155 | 9,019 | 2,758 |
| 18 | Napili-Honokowai | Maui County | $24,814 | $51,030 | 6,788 | 2,629 |
| 19 | Mokulē'ia | Honolulu County | $24,643 | $57,917 | 1,839 | 709 |
| 20 | Waikapu | Maui County | $24,564 | $62,813 | 1,115 | 347 |
| 21 | Waipio | Honolulu County | $24,451 | $61,276 | 11,672 | 3,974 |
| 22 | Mililani Town | Honolulu County | $24,427 | $73,067 | 28,608 | 9,010 |
| 23 | Honolulu | Honolulu County | $24,191 | $45,112 | 371,657 | 140,337 |
| 24 | Kalaoa | Hawaii County | $24,179 | $53,024 | 6,794 | 2,402 |
| 25 | Wailua Homesteads | Kauai County | $23,675 | $48,047 | 4,567 | 1,655 |
| 26 | Pukalani | Maui County | $23,662 | $62,778 | 7,380 | 2,439 |
| 27 | Kalaheo | Kauai County | $23,501 | $57,813 | 3,913 | 1,428 |
| 28 | Kāne'ohe | Honolulu County | $23,476 | $66,006 | 34,970 | 10,976 |
| 29 | Haiku-Pauwela | Maui County | $21,702 | $45,397 | 6,578 | 2,310 |
| 30 | Kalaeloa | Honolulu County | $21,083 | $65,625 | 67 | 16 |
| 31 | Lawai | Kauai County | $22,884 | $55,662 | 1,984 | 711 |
| 32 | Lihue | Kauai County | $22,619 | $44,906 | 5,674 | 2,178 |
| 33 | Paukaa | Hawaii County | $22,246 | $40,804 | 495 | 196 |
| 34 | Kahaluu | Honolulu County | $22,204 | $61,098 | 2,935 | 927 |
| 35 | Kaʻaʻawa | Honolulu County | $21,881 | $54,500 | 1,324 | 469 |
| 36 | Hālawa | Honolulu County | $21,868 | $68,519 | 13,891 | 4,142 |
| 37 | Ewa Gentry | Honolulu County | $21,833 | $61,462 | 4,939 | 1,734 |
| 38 | Pearl City | Honolulu County | $21,683 | $62,036 | 30,976 | 8,921 |
| 39 | Kihei | Maui County | $21,591 | $46,215 | 16,749 | 6,170 |
| 40 | Kealakekua | Hawaii County | $21,495 | $38,026 | 1,645 | 639 |
| 41 | Waikoloa Village | Hawaii County | $21,328 | $50,040 | 4,806 | 1,750 |
| 42 | Hanalei | Kauai County | $21,241 | $34,375 | 478 | 193 |
| 43 | Captain Cook | Hawaii County | $21,237 | $47,644 | 3,206 | 1,152 |
| 44 | Barbers Point Housing | Honolulu County | $21,083 | $65,625 | 67 | 16 |
| 45 | Makakilo | Honolulu County | $20,945 | $66,515 | 13,156 | 3,898 |
| 46 | Waimea | Hawaii County | $20,773 | $51,150 | 7,028 | 2,371 |
| 47 | Kailua | Hawaii County | $20,624 | $40,875 | 9,870 | 3,537 |
| 48 | Wailuku | Maui County | $20,503 | $45,587 | 12,296 | 4,535 |
| 49 | Wailua | Kauai County | $20,231 | $45,875 | 2,083 | 781 |
| 50 | Omao | Kauai County | $20,175 | $53,750 | 1,221 | 392 |
| 51 | Honaunau-Napoopoo | Hawaii County | $20,025 | $41,912 | 2,414 | 846 |
| 52 | Lahaina | Maui County | $19,921 | $52,984 | 9,118 | 2,599 |
| 53 | Village Park | Honolulu County | $19,579 | $70,302 | 9,625 | 2,628 |
| 54 | Wainaku | Hawaii County | $19,296 | $42,292 | 1,227 | 422 |
| 55 | Waipio Acres | Honolulu Acres | $19,251 | $49,594 | 5,298 | 1,823 |
| 56 | Kilauea | Kauai County | $19,184 | $41,313 | 2,092 | 692 |
| 57 | Punalu'u | Honolulu County | $19,067 | $32,143 | 881 | 305 |
| 58 | Volcano | Hawaii County | $18,913 | $35,977 | 2,231 | 896 |
| 59 | Waimea | Kauai County | $18,778 | $44,398 | 1,787 | 620 |
| 60 | Makawao | Maui County | $18,776 | $46,681 | 6,327 | 2,151 |
| 61 | Lanai City | Maui County | $18,668 | $43,271 | 3,164 | 1,148 |
| 62 | Paia | Maui County | $18,644 | $51,696 | 2,499 | 783 |
| 63 | Hilo | Hawaii County | $18,220 | $39,139 | 40,759 | 14,577 |
| 64 | Kahului | Maui County | $18,049 | $46,656 | 20,146 | 5,880 |
| 65 | Waihee-Waiehu | Maui County | $18,008 | $63,236 | 7,310 | 1,864 |
| 66 | Honalo | Hawaii County | $17,584 | $43,125 | 1,987 | 717 |
| 67 | Honoka'a | Hawaii County | $17,226 | $41,964 | 2,233 | 761 |
| 68 | Waialua | Honolulu County | $17,220 | $46,763 | 3,761 | 1,128 |
| 69 | Kapaau | Hawaii County | $17,131 | $45,764 | 1,159 | 405 |
| 70 | Kekaha | Kauai County | $17,117 | $41,103 | 3,175 | 1,073 |
| 71 | Hanapepe | Kauai County | $17,043 | $44,112 | 2,153 | 706 |
| 72 | Kapaa | Kauai County | $16,878 | $39,448 | 9,472 | 3,129 |
| 73 | Hawi | Hawaii County | $16,755 | $46,406 | 938 | 298 |
| 74 | Haliimaile | Maui County | $16,638 | $49,167 | 895 | 254 |
| 75 | Kurtistown | Hawaii County | $16,528 | $46,012 | 1,157 | 405 |
| 76 | Haleiwa | Honolulu County | $16,504 | $39,643 | 2,225 | 770 |
| 77 | Wahiawā | Honolulu County | $16,366 | $41,257 | 16,151 | 5,376 |
| 78 | Hawaiian Acres | Hawaii County | $16,242 | $30,039 | 1,776 | 698 |
| 79 | Hanamaulu | Kauai County | $16,233 | $48,239 | 3,272 | 902 |
| 80 | Koloa | Kauai County | $16,224 | $34,786 | 1,942 | 693 |
| 81 | Puhi | Kauai County | $16,175 | $51,563 | 1,186 | 285 |
| 82 | Waimānalo Beach | Honolulu County | $16,089 | $55,781 | 4,271 | 1,007 |
| 83 | Eleele | Kauai County | $15,873 | $46,705 | 2,040 | 626 |
| 84 | Kukuihaele | Hawaii County | $15,623 | $38,750 | 317 | 106 |
| 85 | North Koolaupoko (Waiāhole, Waikāne) | Honolulu County | $15,592 | $55,179 | 726 | 188 |
| 86 | Leilani Estates | Hawaii County | $15,522 | $31,541 | 1,046 | 415 |
| 87 | Hawaiian Paradise Park | Hawai County | $15,417 | $36,300 | 7,051 | 2,426 |
| 88 | Kualapuu | Maui County | $15,373 | $37,422 | 1,936 | 564 |
| 89 | Hawaiian Ocean View | Hawaii County | $15,218 | $26,125 | 2,178 | 941 |
| 90 | Honomu | Hawaii County | $15,190 | $30,179 | 541 | 193 |
| 91 | Hickam Air Force Base | Honolulu County | $15,039 | $42,298 | 5,471 | 1,632 |
| 92 | Fern Forest | Hawaii County | $14,958 | $24,519 | 480 | 222 |
| 93 | 'Ewa Beach | Honolulu County | $14,807 | $57,073 | 14,650 | 3,305 |
| 94 | Hana | Maui County | $14,672 | $50,833 | 709 | 191 |
| 95 | Keaau | Hawaii County | $14,657 | $39,722 | 2,010 | 608 |
| 96 | Waipahu | Honolulu County | $14,484 | $49,444 | 33,108 | 7,566 |
| 97 | Whitmore Village | Honolulu County | $14,315 | $52,308 | 4,057 | 940 |
| 98 | Makaha | Honolulu County | $14,267 | $35,674 | 7,753 | 2,388 |
| 99 | Kaunakakai | Maui County | $14,201 | $34,492 | 2,726 | 867 |
| 100 | Kaumakani | Kauai County | $14,024 | $34,583 | 607 | 207 |
| 101 | Halaula | Hawaii County | $13,882 | $47,250 | 495 | 149 |
| 102 | Anahola | Kauai County | $13,829 | $41,771 | 1,932 | 549 |
| 103 | Lā'ie | Honolulu County | $13,785 | $50,875 | 4,585 | 903 |
| 104 | Papaikou | Hawaii County | $13,782 | $37,031 | 1,414 | 475 |
| 105 | Orchidlands Estates | Hawaii County | $13,748 | $27,083 | 1,731 | 587 |
| 106 | Paauilo | Hawaii County | $13,477 | $34,659 | 571 | 191 |
| 107 | Waianae | Honolulu County | $13,348 | $46,717 | 10,506 | 2,595 |
| 108 | Iroquois Point | Honolulu County | $13,257 | $44,200 | 2,462 | 675 |
| 109 | Mountain View | Hawaii County | $13,229 | $26,860 | 2,799 | 959 |
| 110 | Mā'ili | Honolulu County | $13,185 | $45,786 | 5,943 | 1,359 |
| 111 | Pepeekeo | Hawaii County | $13,037 | $27,946 | 1,697 | 623 |
| 112 | Marine Corps Base Hawaii | Honolulu County | $12,983 | $34,757 | 11,827 | 2,332 |
| 113 | 'Ewa Villages | Honolulu County | $12,883 | $51,451 | 4,741 | 1,178 |
| 114 | Hauula | Honolulu County | $12,684 | $38,190 | 3,651 | 891 |
| 115 | Pahoa | Hawaii County | $13,850 | $33,333 | 962 | 314 |
| 116 | Waimānalo | Honolulu County | $12,493 | $47,594 | 3,664 | 849 |
| 117 | Wheeler Army Airfield | Honolulu County | $12,364 | $32,485 | 2,829 | 739 |
| 118 | Kahuku | Honolulu County | $12,340 | $39,135 | 2,097 | 509 |
| 119 | Schofield Barracks | Honolulu County | $12,316 | $33,788 | 14,428 | 2,965 |
| 120 | Makaha Valley | Honolulu County | $12,215 | $27,446 | 1,289 | 426 |
| 121 | Laupāhoehoe | Hawaii County | $11,896 | $29,250 | 473 | 178 |
| 122 | Fern Acres | Hawaii County | $11,876 | $31,250 | 756 | 267 |
| 123 | Nā'ālehu | Hawaii County | $11,755 | $31,750 | 919 | 290 |
| 124 | Nānākule | Honolulu County | $11,690 | $45,352 | 10,814 | 2,324 |
| 125 | Nanawale Estates | Hawaii County | $11,524 | $35,703 | 1,073 | 356 |
| 126 | Pahala | Hawaii County | $11,450 | $30,243 | 1,378 | 443 |
| 127 | Hawaiian Beaches | Hawaii County | $11,267 | $28,467 | 3,709 | 1,192 |
| 128 | Ainaloa | Hawaii County | $11,109 | $25,698 | 1,910 | 632 |
| 129 | Eden Roc | Hawaii County | $9,902 | $15,658 | 451 | 186 |
| 130 | Pakala Village | Kauai County | $9,846 | $24,464 | 478 | 150 |
| 131 | Maunaloa | Maui County | $9,032 | $22,232 | 230 | 65 |
