= Tiki Gardens, Hawaii =

Unincorporated community in Hawaii, United States

- Census-designated place
- Location within Hawaii Location within Pacific Ocean
- Coordinates: 19°32′0″N 154°59′54″W
- Country: United States
- State: Hawaii
- County: Hawaii

Area
  - Total: 1.72 sq mi (4.45 km^{2})
  - Land: 1.72 sq mi (4.45 km^{2})
  - Water: 0 sq mi (0.00 km^{2})
- Elevation: 620 ft (190 m)

Population (2020)
  - Total: 555
  - Density: 322.8/sq mi (124.63/km^{2})
- Time zone: UTC-10 (Hawaii–Aleutian Time Zone)
- ZIP Codes: 96749 (Keaau); 96778 (Pahoa)
- Area code: 808
- FIPS code: 15-70280
- GNIS feature ID: 2806904

Tiki Gardens is an unincorporated community and census-designated place (CDP) in Hawaii County, Hawaii, United States. It is on the eastern side of the island of Hawaii and is bordered to the north by Orchidlands Estates, to the south by Ainaloa, and to the west by Hawaiian Acres.

As of the 2020 census, Tiki Gardens had a population of 555.

Tiki Gardens was first listed as a CDP prior to the 2020 census.

== Demographics ==
Historical population
Census	Pop.	Note	%±
2020	555		—
U.S. Decennial Census
