= Pāʻauhau, Hawaii =

Unincorporated community in Hawaii, United States

Pāʻauhau
- Unincorporated community
- Location within Hawaii
- Coordinates: 20°05′07″N 155°26′26″W
- Country: United States
- State: Hawaii
- County: Hawaiʻi
- Elevation: 420 ft (130 m)
- Time zone: UTC-10 (Hawaii-Aleutian)
- Area code: 808
- GNIS feature ID: 362920

Pāʻauhau is an unincorporated community on the island of Hawaiʻi in Hawaiʻi County, Hawaiian Islands. Pāʻauhau is located near the north coast of the island, 2 miles (3.2 km) east-northeast of Honokaʻa.

== History ==
The ancient Hawaiian village in the area was Pāʻauhau, which means "tribute enclosure" in the Hawaiian language.

In 1878 Rufus Anderson Lyman and his family moved to the Hāmākua district and opened a sugarcane plantation. His business partners were Samuel Parker, William G. Irwin, and Claus Spreckels. It was headquartered at coordinates 20°5′9″N 155°26′6″W, on a cliff about 300 feet (100m) above the ocean. Fields reached up the slopes of Mauna Kea, with an innovative transportation system. After the cane was loaded onto a rail car, the full car rolled down to the edge of the cliff by gravity, and pulled an empty car uphill on a parallel track. A small railroad then transported the cane to the mill, along what is now called "Lower Cane Haul Road". It became one of the first fully irrigated plantations in 1911. A small town for worker housing grew up above the mill. Lyman opened the first post office in Hāmākua and served as its postmaster. The company was sold to Honokaʻa Sugar Company in 1972, and it shut down in 1994.

== See also ==
- List of places in Hawaii
