= Royal Hawaiian Estates, Hawaii =

Unincorporated community in Hawaii, United States

- Census-designated place
- Location within Hawaii Location within Pacific Ocean
- Coordinates: 19°26′34″N 155°10′58″W
- Country: United States
- State: Hawaii
- County: Hawaii

Area
  - Total: 2.92 sq mi (7.57 km^{2})
  - Land: 2.92 sq mi (7.57 km^{2})
  - Water: 0 sq mi (0.00 km^{2})
- Elevation: 2,940 ft (900 m)

Population (2020)
  - Total: 790
  - Density: 270.3/sq mi (104.38/km^{2})
- Time zone: UTC-10 (Hawaii–Aleutian Time Zone)
- ZIP Code: 96785 (Volcano)
- Area code: 808
- FIPS code: 15-68807
- GNIS feature ID: 2806900

Royal Hawaiian Estates is an unincorporated community and census-designated place (CDP) in Hawaii County, Hawaii, United States. It is on the eastern side of the island of Hawaii and is bordered to the north by Hawaii Route 11 and to the east by the community of Fern Forest.

As of the 2020 census, Royal Hawaiian Estates had a population of 790.

Royal Hawaiian Estates was first listed as a CDP prior to the 2020 census.

== Demographics ==
Historical population
Census	Pop.	Note	%±
2020	790		—
U.S. Decennial Census
