= Mauna Loa Estates, Hawaii =

Unincorporated community in Hawaii, United States

Mauna Loa Estates
- Census-designated place
- Location within Hawaii Location within Pacific Ocean
- Coordinates: 19°25′41″N 155°13′9″W
- Country: United States
- State: Hawaii
- County: Hawaii

Area
  - Total: 1.84 sq mi (4.76 km^{2})
  - Land: 1.84 sq mi (4.76 km^{2})
  - Water: 0 sq mi (0.00 km^{2})
- Elevation: 3,580 ft (1,090 m)

Population (2020)
  - Total: 1,057
  - Density: 575.4/sq mi (222.16/km^{2})
- Time zone: UTC-10 (Hawaii–Aleutian Time Zone)
- ZIP Code: 96785 (Volcano)
- Area code: 808
- FIPS code: 15-50375
- GNIS feature ID: 2806898

Mauna Loa Estates is an unincorporated community and census-designated place (CDP) in Hawaii County, Hawaii, United States. It is on the eastern side of Kilauea on the island of Hawaii and is bordered to the north, across Hawaii Route 11, by the community of Volcano.

As of the 2020 census, Mauna Loa Estates had a population of 1,057.

Mauna Loa Estates was first listed as a CDP prior to the 2020 census.

== Demographics ==
Historical population
Census	Pop.	Note	%±
2020	1,057		—
U.S. Decennial Census

=== 2020 census ===
As of the 2020 census, Mauna Loa Estates had a population of 1,057. The median age was 50.4 years. 15.0% of residents were under the age of 18 and 29.7% of residents were 65 years of age or older. For every 100 females there were 102.5 males, and for every 100 females age 18 and over there were 101.3 males age 18 and over.

0.0% of residents lived in urban areas, while 100.0% lived in rural areas.

There were 492 households in Mauna Loa Estates, of which 18.5% had children under the age of 18 living in them. Of all households, 44.3% were married-couple households, 22.8% were households with a male householder and no spouse or partner present, and 26.2% were households with a female householder and no spouse or partner present. About 33.1% of all households were made up of individuals and 17.1% had someone living alone who was 65 years of age or older.

There were 613 housing units, of which 19.7% were vacant. The homeowner vacancy rate was 1.4% and the rental vacancy rate was 18.1%.

Racial composition as of the 2020 census
Race	Number	Percent
White	541	51.2%
Black or African American	8	0.8%
American Indian and Alaska Native	13	1.2%
Asian	71	6.7%
Native Hawaiian and Other Pacific Islander	123	11.6%
Some other race	9	0.9%
Two or more races	292	27.6%
Hispanic or Latino (of any race)	102	9.6%
