= Mountain View, Hawaii =

Census-designated place in Hawaii, U.S.

- Census-designated place
- Location in Hawaii County and the state of Hawaii
- Coordinates: 19°32′23″N 155°8′29″W
- Country: United States
- State: Hawaii
- County: Hawaii

Area
  - Total: 54.95 sq mi (142.32 km^{2})
  - Land: 54.95 sq mi (142.31 km^{2})
  - Water: 0.0039 sq mi (0.01 km^{2})
- Elevation: 1,434 ft (437 m)

Population (2020)
  - Total: 4,215
  - Density: 76.7/sq mi (29.62/km^{2})
- Time zone: UTC-10 (Hawaii-Aleutian)
- ZIP code: 96771
- Area code: 808
- FIPS code: 15-53300
- GNIS feature ID: 0362495

Mountain View is a census-designated place (CDP) in Hawaii County, Hawaii, United States located in the District of Puna. As of the 2020 census, Mountain View had a population of 4,215.

== Geography ==
Mountain View is located on the east side of the island of Hawaii, also known as the Big Island, at 19°32′23″N 155°8′29″W (19.539730, -155.141348). It is bordered by Kurtistown to the northeast, Hawaiian Acres to the east, Fern Acres and Eden Roc to the southeast, Fern Forest to the south, and Volcano to the southwest. Hawaii Route 11 runs through the southeast side of the community, leading north 15 miles (24 km) to Hilo and southwest 15 miles to Hawaii Volcanoes National Park.

According to the United States Census Bureau, the CDP has a total area of 55.8 square miles (144.4 km^{2}), all of it land.

== Climate ==
Climate data for Mountain View
Month	Jan	Feb	Mar	Apr	May	Jun	Jul	Aug	Sep	Oct	Nov	Dec	Year
Record high °F (°C)	87 (31)	86 (30)	85 (29)	83 (28)	84 (29)	90 (32)	85 (29)	88 (31)	87 (31)	87 (31)	84 (29)	87 (31)	90 (32)
Mean daily maximum °F (°C)	74.8 (23.8)	74.1 (23.4)	73.4 (23.0)	73.8 (23.2)	75 (24)	76.9 (24.9)	77.2 (25.1)	78.1 (25.6)	78.7 (25.9)	78.2 (25.7)	76 (24)	74.5 (23.6)	75.9 (24.4)
Daily mean °F (°C)	65.8 (18.8)	65.4 (18.6)	65.3 (18.5)	66.1 (18.9)	67.2 (19.6)	68.7 (20.4)	69.4 (20.8)	70.1 (21.2)	70.0 (21.1)	69.6 (20.9)	68.0 (20.0)	66.3 (19.1)	67.7 (19.8)
Mean daily minimum °F (°C)	56.8 (13.8)	56.6 (13.7)	57.2 (14.0)	58.4 (14.7)	59.3 (15.2)	60.5 (15.8)	61.6 (16.4)	62.1 (16.7)	61.3 (16.3)	60.9 (16.1)	59.9 (15.5)	58 (14)	59.4 (15.2)
Record low °F (°C)	43 (6)	38 (3)	45 (7)	47 (8)	49 (9)	49 (9)	52 (11)	52 (11)	51 (11)	48 (9)	47 (8)	42 (6)	38 (3)
Average rainfall inches (mm)	12.69 (322)	16.99 (432)	20.88 (530)	21.14 (537)	15.62 (397)	9.69 (246)	12.88 (327)	15.29 (388)	9.92 (252)	12.84 (326)	19.79 (503)	17.87 (454)	185.6 (4,714)
Average precipitation days	19	20	25	26	27	25	27	27	23	24	23	23	289
Source: WRCC

== Demographics ==
Historical population
Census	Pop.	Note	%±
2000	2,799		—
2010	3,924		40.2%
2020	4,215		7.4%
U.S. Decennial Census

=== 2020 census ===
As of the 2020 census, Mountain View had a population of 4,215. The median age was 39.0 years. 25.2% of residents were under the age of 18 and 16.9% of residents were 65 years of age or older. For every 100 females there were 100.3 males, and for every 100 females age 18 and over there were 98.4 males age 18 and over.

0.0% of residents lived in urban areas, while 100.0% lived in rural areas.

There were 1,428 households in Mountain View, of which 32.8% had children under the age of 18 living in them. Of all households, 45.9% were married-couple households, 23.0% were households with a male householder and no spouse or partner present, and 22.1% were households with a female householder and no spouse or partner present. About 25.9% of all households were made up of individuals and 12.1% had someone living alone who was 65 years of age or older.

There were 1,604 housing units, of which 11.0% were vacant. The homeowner vacancy rate was 2.7% and the rental vacancy rate was 8.1%.

Racial composition as of the 2020 census
Race	Number	Percent
White	1,038	24.6%
Black or African American	15	0.4%
American Indian and Alaska Native	20	0.5%
Asian	579	13.7%
Native Hawaiian and Other Pacific Islander	785	18.6%
Some other race	72	1.7%
Two or more races	1,706	40.5%
Hispanic or Latino (of any race)	715	17.0%

=== 2010 census ===
At the 2010 census, there were 3,924 people in 1,318 households residing in the CDP. The population density was 69.3 inhabitants per square mile (26.8/km^{2}). There were 1,510 housing units at an average density of 26.7 per square mile (10.3/km^{2}). The racial makeup of the CDP was 24.90% White, 0.38% African American, 0.71% American Indian and Alaska Native, 16.00% Asian, 9.89% Native Hawaiian and Pacific Islander, 1.68% from other races, and 46.43% from two or more races. Hispanic or Latino of any race were 20.41% of the population.

Of the 1,318 households, 34.6% had children under the age of 18 living with them. The average household size was 2.98.

In the Mountain View CDP the population was spread out, with 29.6% under the age of 18, 8.8% from 18 to 24, 12.4% from 25 to 34, 18.0 from 35 to 49, 21.5% from 50 to 64, and 9.7% 65 or older. For every 100 females, there were 96.9 males. For every 100 males there were 103.2 females.

=== Income and poverty ===
The median household income was $26,860 and the median income in 2000 for a family was $33,750. Males had a median income in 2000 of $24,250 versus $22,135 for females. The per capita income for the CDP in 2000 was $13,229. About 23.6% of families and 30.3% of the population were below the poverty line in 2000, including 45.7% of those under age 18 and 5.0% of those age 65 or over.

== Education ==
The statewide school district is the Hawaii State Department of Education, and it covers Hawaii County. Mountain View Elementary School is in the community.

The Hawaii State Public Library System operates the Mountain View Public and School Library.
