= Volcano Golf Course, Hawaii =

Unincorporated community in Hawaii, United States

- Census-designated place
- Location within Hawaii Location within Pacific Ocean
- Coordinates: 19°26′28″N 155°16′45″W
- Country: United States
- State: Hawaii
- County: Hawaii

Area
  - Total: 0.93 sq mi (2.40 km^{2})
  - Land: 0.93 sq mi (2.40 km^{2})
  - Water: 0 sq mi (0.00 km^{2})
- Elevation: 4,010 ft (1,220 m)

Population (2020)
  - Total: 363
  - Density: 391.4/sq mi (151.11/km^{2})
- Time zone: UTC-10 (Hawaii–Aleutian Time Zone)
- ZIP Code: 96785 (Volcano)
- Area code: 808
- FIPS code: 15-72350
- GNIS feature ID: 2806905

Volcano Golf Course is an unincorporated community and census-designated place (CDP) in Hawaii County, Hawaii, United States. It is directly north of Kilauea on the island of Hawaii and is bordered to the north and east by the community of Volcano and to the south by Hawaii Volcanoes National Park.

As of the 2020 census, Volcano Golf Course had a population of 363.

The community was first listed as a CDP prior to the 2020 census.

== Demographics ==
Historical population
Census	Pop.	Note	%±
2020	363		—
U.S. Decennial Census
