= Helemano, Hawaii =

- Census-designated place
- Location within Hawaii
- Coordinates: 21°32′9″N 158°1′11″W
- Country: United States
- State: Hawaii
- County: Honolulu

Area
  - Total: 0.46 sq mi (1.20 km^{2})
  - Land: 0.46 sq mi (1.20 km^{2})
  - Water: 0 sq mi (0.00 km^{2})
- Elevation: 1,099 ft (335 m)

Population (2020)
  - Total: 2,549
  - Density: 5,480.5/sq mi (2,116.04/km^{2})
- Time zone: UTC-10 (Hawaii–Aleutian Time Zone)
- ZIP Code: 96786 (Wahiawa)
- Area code: 808
- FIPS code: 15-13970
- GNIS feature ID: 2804359

Helemano is a census-designated place (CDP) in Honolulu County, Hawaii, United States. It is north of the center of the island of Oahu, 9 miles (14 km) southeast of Waialua and 25 miles (40 km) northwest of Honolulu.

As of the 2020 census, Helemano had a population of 2,549.

The community was first listed as a CDP prior to the 2020 census.

== Demographics ==
Historical population
Census	Pop.	Note	%±
2020	2,549		—
U.S. Decennial Census

=== 2020 census ===
As of the 2020 census, Helemano had a population of 2,549. The median age was 23.9 years. 27.6% of residents were under the age of 18 and 1.8% of residents were 65 years of age or older. For every 100 females there were 118.8 males, and for every 100 females age 18 and over there were 127.2 males age 18 and over.

0.0% of residents lived in urban areas, while 100.0% lived in rural areas.

There were 832 households in Helemano, of which 44.8% had children under the age of 18 living in them. Of all households, 78.5% were married-couple households, 11.9% were households with a male householder and no spouse or partner present, and 7.9% were households with a female householder and no spouse or partner present. About 11.2% of all households were made up of individuals and 1.0% had someone living alone who was 65 years of age or older.

There were 994 housing units, of which 16.3% were vacant. The homeowner vacancy rate was 0.0% and the rental vacancy rate was 7.1%.

Racial composition as of the 2020 census
Race	Number	Percent
White	1,212	47.5%
Black or African American	373	14.6%
American Indian and Alaska Native	39	1.5%
Asian	106	4.2%
Native Hawaiian and Other Pacific Islander	127	5.0%
Some other race	210	8.2%
Two or more races	482	18.9%
Hispanic or Latino (of any race)	622	24.4%
