= Eden Roc, Hawaii =

Census-designated place in Hawaii, United States

- Census-designated place
- Location in Hawaii County and the state of Hawaii
- Coordinates: 19°29′40″N 155°6′20″W
- Country: United States
- State: Hawaii
- County: Hawaii

Area
  - Total: 6.40 sq mi (16.57 km^{2})
  - Land: 6.40 sq mi (16.57 km^{2})
  - Water: 0 sq mi (0.00 km^{2})
- Elevation: 1,788 ft (545 m)

Population (2020)
  - Total: 1,386
  - Density: 216.7/sq mi (83.66/km^{2})
- Time zone: UTC-10 (Hawaii-Aleutian)
- Area code: 808
- FIPS code: 15-06325
- GNIS feature ID: 1852576

Eden Roc is a census-designated place (CDP) in Hawaiʻi County, Hawaiʻi, United States, located in the District of Puna. As of the 2020 census, Eden Roc had a population of 1,386.

== Geography ==
Eden Roc is located on the eastern side of the island of Hawaii at 19°29′40″N 155°6′20″W (19.494564, -155.105427). It is bordered to the east by Fern Acres, to the north by Mountain View, and to the west by Fern Forest. It is 3 miles (5 km) south of Hawaii Route 11 at a point 16 miles (26 km) south of Hilo and 13 miles (21 km) northeast of Hawaiʻi Volcanoes National Park.

According to the United States Census Bureau, the Eden Roc CDP has a total area of 6.4 square miles (16.6 km^{2}), all of it land.

== Demographics ==
Historical population
Census	Pop.	Note	%±
2020	1,386		—
U.S. Decennial Census

=== 2020 census ===
As of the 2020 census, Eden Roc had a population of 1,386. The median age was 41.2 years. 23.3% of residents were under the age of 18 and 18.1% of residents were 65 years of age or older. For every 100 females there were 116.2 males, and for every 100 females age 18 and over there were 114.3 males age 18 and over.

0.0% of residents lived in urban areas, while 100.0% lived in rural areas.

There were 528 households in Eden Roc, of which 23.9% had children under the age of 18 living in them. Of all households, 37.7% were married-couple households, 32.6% were households with a male householder and no spouse or partner present, and 23.3% were households with a female householder and no spouse or partner present. About 35.4% of all households were made up of individuals and 15.0% had someone living alone who was 65 years of age or older.

There were 629 housing units, of which 16.1% were vacant. The homeowner vacancy rate was 2.9% and the rental vacancy rate was 4.5%.

Racial composition as of the 2020 census
Race	Number	Percent
White	566	40.8%
Black or African American	21	1.5%
American Indian and Alaska Native	8	0.6%
Asian	38	2.7%
Native Hawaiian and Other Pacific Islander	284	20.5%
Some other race	51	3.7%
Two or more races	418	30.2%
Hispanic or Latino (of any race)	178	12.8%

=== 2010 census ===
As of the census of 2010, there were 942 people in 394 households residing in the CDP. The population density was 134.6 inhabitants per square mile (52.0/km^{2}). There were 485 housing units at an average density of 69.3 per square mile (26.8/km^{2}). The racial makeup of the CDP was 46.18% White, 0.42% African American, 0.53% American Indian & Alaska Native, 4.46% Asian, 9.98% Native Hawaiian & Pacific Islander, 0.42% from other races, and 38.00% from two or more races. Hispanic or Latino of any race were 16.24% of the population.

There were 394 households, out of which 24.8% had children under the age of 18 living with them. The average household size was 2.39.

In the CDP the population was spread out, with 25.7% under the age of 18, 7.9% from 18 to 24, 12.6% from 25 to 34, 19.7% from 35 to 49, 29.5% from 50 to 64, and 4.6% who were 65 years of age or older. For every 100 females, there were 134.9 males. For every 100 females, there were 74.1 males.

=== 2000 census ===
The median income for a household in the CDP at 2000 was $15,658, and the median income for a family at 2000 was $38,229. In the 2000 census, males had a median income of $21,146 versus $19,464 for females. The per capita income for the CDP in 2000 was $9,902. About 16.9% of families and 34.9% of the population were below the poverty line in the 2000 census, including 18.9% of those under age 18 and none of those age 65 or over.
