= Discovery Harbour, Hawaii =

Unincorporated community in Hawaii, United States

- Census-designated place
- Location within Hawaii
- Coordinates: 19°02′34″N 155°37′49″W
- Country: United States
- State: Hawaii
- County: Hawaii

Area
  - Total: 3.56 sq mi (9.22 km^{2})
  - Land: 3.56 sq mi (9.22 km^{2})
  - Water: 0 sq mi (0.00 km^{2})
- Elevation: 1,142 ft (348 m)

Population (2020)
  - Total: 1,171
  - Density: 329.0/sq mi (127.03/km^{2})
- Time zone: UTC-10 (Hawaii-Aleutian)
- ZIP code: 96772
- Area code: 808
- GNIS feature ID: 2631653

Discovery Harbour is an unincorporated community and census-designated place on the island of Hawaii in Hawaii County, Hawaii, United States. Its population was 1,171 as of the 2020 census. The community is located near the island's southern tip, south of Hawaii Route 11. It is the southernmost populated place in the 50 states of the U.S., surpassing Naalehu by 5.4 miles (8.7 km).

== Geography ==
Discovery Harbour is located at 19.0428930°N 155.6303920°W. According to the U.S. Census Bureau, the community has an area of 3.559 square miles (9.22 km^{2}), all of it land.

== Demographics ==
Historical population
Census	Pop.	Note	%±
2020	1,171		—
U.S. Decennial Census

=== 2020 census ===
As of the 2020 census, Discovery Harbour had a population of 1,171. The median age was 56.2 years. 13.9% of residents were under the age of 18 and 35.8% of residents were 65 years of age or older. For every 100 females there were 105.4 males, and for every 100 females age 18 and over there were 103.6 males age 18 and over.

0.0% of residents lived in urban areas, while 100.0% lived in rural areas.

There were 500 households in Discovery Harbour, of which 16.6% had children under the age of 18 living in them. Of all households, 51.6% were married-couple households, 20.0% were households with a male householder and no spouse or partner present, and 21.6% were households with a female householder and no spouse or partner present. About 32.4% of all households were made up of individuals and 19.2% had someone living alone who was 65 years of age or older.

There were 632 housing units, of which 20.9% were vacant. The homeowner vacancy rate was 1.2% and the rental vacancy rate was 9.6%.

Racial composition as of the 2020 census
Race	Number	Percent
White	673	57.5%
Black or African American	17	1.5%
American Indian and Alaska Native	1	0.1%
Asian	90	7.7%
Native Hawaiian and Other Pacific Islander	119	10.2%
Some other race	12	1.0%
Two or more races	259	22.1%
Hispanic or Latino (of any race)	88	7.5%
