= Black Sands, Hawaii =

Unincorporated community in Hawaii, United States

- Census-designated place
- Location within Hawaii
- Coordinates: 19°24′43″N 154°57′37″W
- Country: United States
- State: Hawaii
- County: Hawaii

Area
  - Total: 0.54 sq mi (1.40 km^{2})
  - Land: 0.54 sq mi (1.40 km^{2})
  - Water: 0 sq mi (0.00 km^{2})
- Elevation: 880 ft (270 m)

Population (2020)
  - Total: 416
  - Density: 770.4/sq mi (297.44/km^{2})
- Time zone: UTC-10 (Hawaii–Aleutian Time Zone)
- ZIP Code: 96778 (Pahoa)
- Area code: 808
- FIPS code: 15-02832
- GNIS feature ID: 2806891

Black Sands is an unincorporated community and census-designated place (CDP) in Hawaii County, Hawaii, United States. As of the 2020 census, Black Sands had a population of 416. It is bordered to the southeast, across Hawaii Route 130, by the community of Seaview.

Black Sands was first listed as a CDP prior to the 2020 census.

== Demographics ==
Historical population
Census	Pop.	Note	%±
2020	416		—
U.S. Decennial Census
