= Kamāʻili, Hawaii =

Unincorporated community in Hawaii, United States

Kamāʻili
- Census-designated place
- Location within Hawaii
- Coordinates: 19°26′28″N 154°55′3″W
- Country: United States
- State: Hawaii
- County: Hawaii

Area
  - Total: 7.08 sq mi (18.34 km^{2})
  - Land: 7.08 sq mi (18.34 km^{2})
  - Water: 0 sq mi (0.00 km^{2})
- Elevation: 490 ft (150 m)

Population (2020)
  - Total: 157
  - Density: 22.2/sq mi (8.56/km^{2})
- Time zone: UTC-10 (Hawaii–Aleutian Time Zone)
- ZIP Code: 96778 (Pahoa)
- Area code: 808
- FIPS code: 15-27350
- GNIS feature ID: 2806896

Kamāʻili (Hawaiian for 'the pebbles') is an unincorporated community and census-designated place (CDP) in Hawaii County, Hawaii, United States. It is on the eastern side of the island of Hawaii and is bordered to the north by Leilani Estates and to the south by Seaview.

The community was first listed as a CDP prior to the 2020 census.

== Demographics ==
Historical population
Census	Pop.	Note	%±
2020	157		—
U.S. Decennial Census
