= Seaview, Hawaii =

Unincorporated community in Hawaii, United States

- Census-designated place
- Location within Hawaii Location within Pacific Ocean
- Coordinates: 19°24′29″N 154°55′25″W
- Country: United States
- State: Hawaii
- County: Hawaii

Area
  - Total: 0.66 sq mi (1.70 km^{2})
  - Land: 0.66 sq mi (1.70 km^{2})
  - Water: 0 sq mi (0.00 km^{2})
- Elevation: 210 ft (64 m)

Population (2020)
  - Total: 512
  - Density: 778.6/sq mi (300.61/km^{2})
- Time zone: UTC-10 (Hawaii–Aleutian Time Zone)
- ZIP Code: 96778 (Pahoa)
- Area code: 808
- FIPS code: 15-69238
- GNIS feature ID: 2812709

Seaview is an unincorporated community and census-designated place (CDP) in Hawaii County, Hawaii, United States. As of the 2020 census, Seaview had a population of 512. It is on the eastern side of the island of Hawaii and is bordered to the north by Kamaili, to the northwest by Black Sands, to the southwest by Kalapana, and to the southeast by the Pacific Ocean. Hawaii Route 130 forms the northwest edge of the CDP, and Hawaii Route 137 runs along the Pacific coast in the southeast.

Seaview was first listed as a CDP prior to the 2020 census.

== Demographics ==
Historical population
Census	Pop.	Note	%±
2020	512		—
U.S. Decennial Census
