= Hawaiian Paradise Park, Hawaii =

Census-designated place in the United States

Hawaiian Paradise Park, Hawaii Paradise Park
- Census-designated place
- Nickname: HPP
- Location in Hawaii County and the state of Hawaii
- Coordinates: 19°35′25″N 154°58′33″W
- Country: United States
- State: Hawaiʻi
- County: Hawaiʻi

Area
  - Total: 15.67 sq mi (40.59 km^{2})
  - Land: 15.30 sq mi (39.63 km^{2})
  - Water: 0.37 sq mi (0.96 km^{2})
- Elevation: 140 ft (43 m)

Population (2020)
  - Total: 14,957
  - Density: 977.5/sq mi (377.43/km^{2})
- Time zone: UTC-10 (Hawaiʻi-Aleutian (HST))
- ZIP code: 96749
- Area code: 808
- FIPS code: 15-12600
- GNIS feature ID: 1867254

Hawaiian Paradise Park, also referred to as Paradise Park and known by many as HPP, is a census-designated place (CDP) in Hawaiʻi County, Hawaiʻi, United States, located in the District of Puna. As of the 2020 census, Hawaiian Paradise Park had a population of 14,957. There are also numerous historic and archeological preservation sites in the subdivision, which include Native Hawaiian petroglyphs, heiau, and burial sites.

== Geography ==
Hawaiian Paradise Park is located on the eastern side of the island of Hawaii at 19°35′25″N 154°58′33″W (19.590388, -154.975734). It is bordered to the northeast by the Pacific Ocean, to the southeast by Hawaiian Beaches, and to the southwest by Orchidlands Estates and Ainaloa. Hawaii Route 130 runs along the southwest edge of the CDP, leading northwest 5 miles (8 km) to Keaau. Hilo is 13 miles (21 km) northwest of Hawaiian Paradise Park.

According to the United States Census Bureau, the CDP has a total area of 15.6 square miles (40.4 km^{2}), of which 15.2 square miles (39.4 km^{2}) are land and 0.4 square miles (1.0 km^{2}), or 2.39%, are water. Elevations in the community range from sea level along the Pacific shore to 490 feet (150 m) in the southern corner.

== Demographics ==
Historical population
Census	Pop.	Note	%±
2020	14,957		—
U.S. Decennial Census

=== 2020 census ===
As of the 2020 census, Hawaiian Paradise Park had a population of 14,957. The median age was 41.4 years. 23.5% of residents were under the age of 18 and 19.5% of residents were 65 years of age or older. For every 100 females there were 102.2 males, and for every 100 females age 18 and over there were 100.4 males age 18 and over.

0.0% of residents lived in urban areas, while 100.0% lived in rural areas.

There were 5,132 households in Hawaiian Paradise Park, of which 33.2% had children under the age of 18 living in them. Of all households, 50.6% were married-couple households, 18.2% were households with a male householder and no spouse or partner present, and 21.0% were households with a female householder and no spouse or partner present. About 21.0% of all households were made up of individuals and 10.6% had someone living alone who was 65 years of age or older.

There were 5,745 housing units, of which 10.7% were vacant. The homeowner vacancy rate was 2.6% and the rental vacancy rate was 7.1%.

Racial composition as of the 2020 census
Race	Number	Percent
White	5,008	33.5%
Black or African American	121	0.8%
American Indian and Alaska Native	109	0.7%
Asian	2,697	18.0%
Native Hawaiian and Other Pacific Islander	1,902	12.7%
Some other race	279	1.9%
Two or more races	4,841	32.4%
Hispanic or Latino (of any race)	2,046	13.7%

=== 2010 census ===
As of the census of 2010, there were 11,404 people in 3,892 households residing in the CDP. The population density was 760.3 inhabitants per square mile (293.6/km^{2}). There were 4,526 housing units at an average density of 301.7 per square mile (116.5/km^{2}). The racial makeup of the CDP was 34.71% White, 0.78% African American, 0.61% American Indian & Alaska Native, 18.84% Asian, 11.76% Native Hawaiian & Pacific Islander, 1.05% from other races, and 32.26% from two or more races. Hispanic or Latino of any race were 14.89% of the population.

There were 3,892 households, out of which 33.0% had children under the age of 18 living with them. The average household size was 2.93.

In the CDP the population was spread out, with 27.4% under the age of 18, 8.1% from 18 to 24, 12.7% from 25 to 34, 18.9% from 35 to 49, 22.4% from 50 to 64, and 10.5% who were 65 years of age or older. For every 100 females, there were 102.1 males. For every 100 males there were 98.0 females.

=== 2000 census ===
The median income for a household in the CDP at the 2000 census was $36,300, and the median income for a family in 2000 was $38,312. Males had a median income of $35,450 versus $23,642 for females in 2000. The per capita income for the CDP in 2000 was $15,417. About 17.0% of families and 19.6% of the population were below the poverty line in 2000, including 28.1% of those under age 18 and 7.6% of those age 65 or over.
