= Kaiminani, Hawaii =

Unincorporated community in Hawaii, United States

Kaiminani
- Census-designated place
- Location within Hawaii
- Coordinates: 19°43′32″N 156°1′34″W
- Country: United States
- State: Hawaii
- County: Hawaii

Area
  - Total: 40.95 sq mi (106.06 km^{2})
  - Land: 37.21 sq mi (96.37 km^{2})
  - Water: 3.75 sq mi (9.70 km^{2})
- Elevation: 200 ft (61 m)

Population (2020)
  - Total: 12,590
  - Density: 338.4/sq mi (130.64/km^{2})
- Time zone: UTC-10 (Hawaii–Aleutian Time Zone)
- ZIP Code: 96740 (Kailua Kona)
- Area code: 808
- FIPS code: 15-23675
- GNIS feature ID: 2414061

Kaiminani is an unincorporated community and census-designated place (CDP) in Hawaii County, Hawaii, United States. It is the westernmost community on the island of Hawaii and is bordered to the east by Kaloko and to the south by Kailua-Kona.

As of the 2020 census, Kaiminani had a population of 12,590.

The community was first listed as a CDP prior to the 2020 census. It occupies most of the territory that once belonged to the Kalaoa CDP, excluding 5.65 mi² of vacation-home tracts and Kekaha Kai State Park.

== Demographics ==
Historical population
Census	Pop.	Note	%±
2020	12,590		—
U.S. Decennial Census

=== 2020 census ===
As of the 2020 census, Kaiminani had a population of 12,590. The median age was 41.3 years. 21.4% of residents were under the age of 18 and 18.6% of residents were 65 years of age or older. For every 100 females there were 98.7 males, and for every 100 females age 18 and over there were 98.5 males age 18 and over.

65.2% of residents lived in urban areas, while 34.8% lived in rural areas.

There were 4,337 households in Kaiminani, of which 31.6% had children under the age of 18 living in them. Of all households, 53.8% were married-couple households, 16.2% were households with a male householder and no spouse or partner present, and 21.0% were households with a female householder and no spouse or partner present. About 18.0% of all households were made up of individuals and 7.5% had someone living alone who was 65 years of age or older.

There were 4,774 housing units, of which 9.2% were vacant. The homeowner vacancy rate was 0.7% and the rental vacancy rate was 5.6%.

Racial composition as of the 2020 census
Race	Number	Percent
White	5,379	42.7%
Black or African American	67	0.5%
American Indian and Alaska Native	45	0.4%
Asian	1,670	13.3%
Native Hawaiian and Other Pacific Islander	1,799	14.3%
Some other race	354	2.8%
Two or more races	3,276	26.0%
Hispanic or Latino (of any race)	1,285	10.2%

== Transportation ==
Kona International Airport is in the CDP.

== Education ==
The statewide school district is the Hawaii State Department of Education, and it covers Hawaii County.
