= Kahaluʻu-Keauhou, Hawaii =

Census-designated place in Hawaii, U.S.

Kahaluʻu-Keauhou
- Census-designated place
- Location in Hawaiʻi County and the state of Hawaiʻi
- Coordinates: 19°34′32″N 155°57′38″W
- Country: United States
- State: Hawaii
- County: Hawaii

Area
  - Total: 10.28 sq mi (26.63 km^{2})
  - Land: 8.01 sq mi (20.74 km^{2})
  - Water: 2.27 sq mi (5.89 km^{2})
- Elevation: 100 ft (30 m)

Population (2020)
  - Total: 4,778
  - Density: 596.8/sq mi (230.43/km^{2})
- Time zone: UTC-10 (Hawaii-Aleutian)
- Area code: 808
- FIPS code: 15-21230
- GNIS feature ID: 2414055

Kahaluʻu-Keauhou is a census-designated place (CDP) in Hawaiʻi County, Hawaii, United States. The population was 4,778 at the 2020 census, up from 3,549 at the 2010 census.

== Geography ==
Kahaluʻu-Keauhou is located on the western side of the island of Hawaiʻi at 19°34′32″N 155°57′38″W (19.575554, -155.960522). It is bordered to the north by Holualoa, to the east by Honalo, and to the west by the Pacific Ocean. Kealakekua is 5 miles (8 km) to the south.

According to the United States Census Bureau, the Kahaluʻu-Keauhou CDP has a total area of 7.9 square miles (20.4 km^{2}), of which 5.6 square miles (14.5 km^{2}) are land and 2.3 square miles (5.9 km^{2}), or 28.89%, are water.

On the coast is the historic district of Kahaluʻu Bay.

== Demographics ==
Historical population
Census	Pop.	Note	%±
2020	4,778		—
U.S. Decennial Census

=== 2000 Census data ===
As of the census of 2000, there were 2,414 people, 1,000 households, and 661 families residing in the CDP. The population density was 407.2 inhabitants per square mile (157.2/km^{2}). There were 2,339 housing units at an average density of 394.6 per square mile (152.4/km^{2}). The racial makeup of the CDP was 65.53% White, 0.37% African American, 0.33% Native American, 11.35% Asian, 7.87% Pacific Islander, 0.79% from other races, and 13.75% from two or more races. Hispanic or Latino of any race were 4.02% of the population.

Of 1,000 households, 18.6% had children under the age of 18 living with them, 54.4% were married couples living together, 8.8% had a female householder with no husband present, and 33.8% were non-families. 24.4% of all households were made up of individuals, and 9.7% had someone living alone who was 65 years of age or older. The average household size was 2.33 and the average family size was 2.68.

In the CDP the population was spread out, with 16.4% under the age of 18, 5.0% from 18 to 24, 19.8% from 25 to 44, 36.0% from 45 to 64, and 22.7% who were 65 years of age or older. The median age was 49 years. For every 100 females, there were 101.5 males. For every 100 females age 18 and over, there were 97.0 males.

The median income for a household in the CDP was $52,522, and the median income for a family was $60,368. Males had a median income of $31,583 versus $26,389 for females. The per capita income for the CDP was $33,067. About 8.6% of families and 13.4% of the population were below the poverty line, including 35.9% of those under age 18 and 3.9% of those age 65 or over.
