= Fern Acres, Hawaii =

Census-designated place in Hawaii, United States

- Census-designated place
- Location in Hawaii County and the state of Hawaii
- Coordinates: 19°30′43″N 155°5′24″W
- Country: United States
- State: Hawaii
- County: Hawaii

Area
  - Total: 6.81 sq mi (17.63 km^{2})
  - Land: 6.81 sq mi (17.63 km^{2})
  - Water: 0 sq mi (0.00 km^{2})
- Elevation: 1,532 ft (467 m)

Population (2020)
  - Total: 1,965
  - Density: 288.7/sq mi (111.45/km^{2})
- Time zone: UTC-10 (Hawaii-Aleutian)
- Area code: 808
- FIPS code: 15-07542
- GNIS feature ID: 1852577

Fern Acres is a census-designated place (CDP) in Hawaiʻi County, Hawaiʻi, United States, located in the District of Puna. As of the 2020 census, Fern Acres had a population of 1,965.

== Geography ==
Fern Acres is located on the eastern side of the island of Hawaii at 19°30′43″N 155°5′24″W (19.511846, -155.089878). It is bordered to the east by Hawaiian Acres, to the north by Mountain View, and to the west by Eden Roc. To the south is the Puna Forest Reserve. The community is 17 miles (27 km) south of Hilo and 16 miles (26 km) east of the entrance to Hawaii Volcanoes National Park.

According to the United States Census Bureau, the CDP has a total area of 6.8 square miles (17.6 km^{2}), all of it land.

== Demographics ==
Historical population
Census	Pop.	Note	%±
2020	1,965		—
U.S. Decennial Census

=== 2020 census ===
As of the 2020 census, Fern Acres had a population of 1,965. The median age was 45.1 years. 18.5% of residents were under the age of 18 and 20.0% of residents were 65 years of age or older. For every 100 females there were 114.8 males, and for every 100 females age 18 and over there were 110.1 males age 18 and over.

0.0% of residents lived in urban areas, while 100.0% lived in rural areas.

There were 770 households in Fern Acres, of which 28.4% had children under the age of 18 living in them. Of all households, 45.8% were married-couple households, 23.4% were households with a male householder and no spouse or partner present, and 21.8% were households with a female householder and no spouse or partner present. About 25.5% of all households were made up of individuals and 13.2% had someone living alone who was 65 years of age or older.

There were 858 housing units, of which 10.3% were vacant. The homeowner vacancy rate was 1.0% and the rental vacancy rate was 4.0%.

Racial composition as of the 2020 census
Race	Number	Percent
White	805	41.0%
Black or African American	29	1.5%
American Indian and Alaska Native	7	0.4%
Asian	91	4.6%
Native Hawaiian and Other Pacific Islander	330	16.8%
Some other race	48	2.4%
Two or more races	655	33.3%
Hispanic or Latino (of any race)	241	12.3%

=== 2010 census ===
As of the census of 2010, there were 1,504 people in 594 households residing in the CDP. The population density was 238.7 inhabitants per square mile (92.2/km^{2}). There were 704 housing units at an average density of 111.7 per square mile (43.1/km^{2}). The racial makeup of the CDP was 39.30% White, 0.60% African American, 0.40% American Indian & Alaska Native, 6.58% Asian, 11.70% Native Hawaiian & Pacific Islander, 0.73% from other races, and 40.69% from two or more races. Hispanic or Latino of any race were 15.76% of the population.

There were 594 households, out of which 24.4% had children under the age of 18 living with them. The average household size was 2.53.

In the CDP the population was spread out, with 24.1% under the age of 18, 7.5% from 18 to 24, 12.0% from 25 to 34, 21.5% from 35 to 49, 25.3% from 50 to 64, and 9.5% who were 65 years of age or older. For every 100 females, there were 105.7 males. For every 100 males there were 94.6 females.

=== 2000 census ===
The median income for a household in the CDP at the 2000 census was $31,250, and the median income for a family was $32,981. Males had a median income at the 2000 census of $20,417 versus $23,250 for females. The per capita income for the CDP at the 2000 census was $11,876. About 10.9% of families and 16.4% of the population were below the poverty line at the 2000 census, including 12.4% of those under age 18 and none of those age 65 or over.
