= Kurtistown, Hawaii =

Census-designated place in Hawaii, U.S.

- Census-designated place
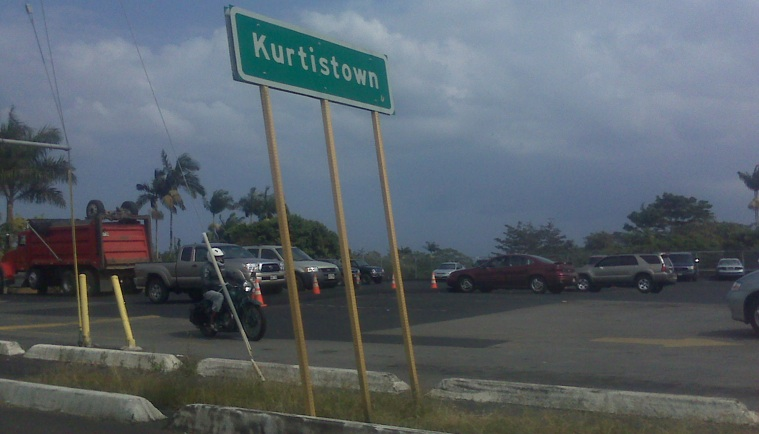
- Kurtistown welcome sign

- Location in Hawaii County and the state of Hawaii
- Coordinates: 19°35′26″N 155°4′13″W
- Country: United States
- State: Hawaii
- County: Hawaii

Area
  - Total: 7.15 sq mi (18.53 km^{2})
  - Land: 7.15 sq mi (18.53 km^{2})
  - Water: 0 sq mi (0.00 km^{2})
- Elevation: 633 ft (193 m)

Population (2020)
  - Total: 2,515
  - Density: 351.6/sq mi (135.75/km^{2})
- Time zone: UTC-10 (Hawaii-Aleutian)
- ZIP code: 96760
- Area code: 808
- FIPS code: 15-42800
- GNIS feature ID: 0361629

Kurtistown is a census-designated place (CDP) in Hawaiʻi County, Hawaiʻi, United States, in the District of Puna. As of the 2020 census, Kurtistown had a population of 2,515.

== Geography ==
Kurtistown is located on the east side of the island of Hawaii at 19°35′26″N 155°4′13″W (19.590584, -155.070142). It is bordered to the northeast by Keaʻau, to the southeast by Orchidlands Estates, to the south by Hawaiian Acres, and to the west by Mountain View. Hawaii Route 11 passes through the community, leading north 10 miles (16 km) to Hilo and southwest 20 miles (32 km) to Hawaii Volcanoes National Park.

According to the United States Census Bureau, the Kurtistown CDP has a total area of 5.9 square miles (15.4 km^{2}), all of it land.

== Demographics ==
Historical population
Census	Pop.	Note	%±
2020	2,515		—
U.S. Decennial Census

=== 2020 census ===
As of the 2020 census, Kurtistown had a population of 2,515. The median age was 44.9 years. 22.0% of residents were under the age of 18 and 22.5% of residents were 65 years of age or older. For every 100 females there were 91.3 males, and for every 100 females age 18 and over there were 92.8 males age 18 and over.

0.0% of residents lived in urban areas, while 100.0% lived in rural areas.

There were 845 households in Kurtistown, of which 34.6% had children under the age of 18 living in them. Of all households, 52.7% were married-couple households, 17.4% were households with a male householder and no spouse or partner present, and 22.1% were households with a female householder and no spouse or partner present. About 20.9% of all households were made up of individuals and 11.9% had someone living alone who was 65 years of age or older.

There were 905 housing units, of which 6.6% were vacant. The homeowner vacancy rate was 1.5% and the rental vacancy rate was 3.3%.

Racial composition as of the 2020 census
Race	Number	Percent
White	400	15.9%
Black or African American	14	0.6%
American Indian and Alaska Native	6	0.2%
Asian	825	32.8%
Native Hawaiian and Other Pacific Islander	313	12.4%
Some other race	15	0.6%
Two or more races	942	37.5%
Hispanic or Latino (of any race)	314	12.5%

=== 2010 census ===
As of the census of 2010, there were 1,298 people in 476 households residing in the CDP. The population density was 223.8 inhabitants per square mile (86.4/km^{2}). There were 532 housing units at an average density of 91.7 units per square mile (35.4 units/km^{2}). The racial makeup of the CDP was 19.49% White, 0.23% African American, 0.31% American Indian & Alaska Native, 35.82% Asian, 9.40% Native Hawaiian & Pacific Islander, 0.69% from other races, and 34.05% from two or more races. Hispanic or Latino of any race were 10.02% of the population.

There were 476 households, out of which 26.3% had children under the age of 18 living with them. The average household size was 2.73.

In the Kurtistown CDP the population was spread out, with 22.6% under the age of 18, 8.9% from 18 to 24, 8.7% from 25 to 34, 18.9% from 35 to 49, 24.7% from 50 to 64, and 16.3% who were 65 years of age or older. For every 100 females, there were 99.4 males. For every 100 males there were 100.6 females.

=== 2000 census ===
The median income for a household in the CDP at the 2000 census was $46,012, and the median income for a family in 2000 was $51,176. Males had a median income in 2000 of $35,000 versus $26,875 for females. The per capita income for the CDP in 2000 was $16,528. About 6.5% of families and 8.4% of the population were below the poverty line in 2000, including 7.2% of those under age 18 and 2.0% of those age 65 or over.
