= Nānāwale Estates, Hawaii =

Census-designated place in Hawaii, U.S.

Nānāwale Estates
- Census-designated place
- Location in Hawaii County and the state of Hawaii
- Coordinates: 19°30′26″N 154°54′49″W
- Country: United States
- State: Hawaii
- County: Hawaii

Area
  - Total: 2.53 sq mi (6.56 km^{2})
  - Land: 2.53 sq mi (6.56 km^{2})
  - Water: 0 sq mi (0.00 km^{2})
- Elevation: 420 ft (128 m)

Population (2020)
  - Total: 1,652
  - Density: 651.9/sq mi (251.71/km^{2})
- Time zone: UTC-10 (Hawaii-Aleutian)
- ZIP code: 96778
- Area code: 808
- FIPS code: 15-53975
- GNIS feature ID: 1852581

Nānāwale Estates is a census-designated place (CDP) in Hawaiʻi County, Hawaii, located in the District of Puna. The population was 1,426 at the 2010 census, up from 1,073 at the 2000 census.

== Geography ==
Nānāwale Estates is located on the east side of the island of Hawaii at 19°30′26″N 154°54′49″W (19.507139, -154.913726). It is bordered to the north by Hawaiian Beaches, to the west by Pahoa, and to the south by the Nānāwale Forest Reserve. It is 20 miles (32 km) south of Hilo.

According to the United States Census Bureau, the CDP has a total area of 2.2 square miles (5.7 km^{2}), all of it land.

== Demographics ==
Historical population
Census	Pop.	Note	%±
2000	1,073		—
2010	1,426		32.9%
2020	1,652		15.8%
U.S. Decennial Census

As of the 2010 census, there were 1,426 people in 520 households residing in the CDP. The population density was 750.5 inhabitants per square mile (289.8/km^{2}). There were 625 housing units at an average density of 328.9 per square mile (127.0/km^{2}). The racial makeup of the CDP was 36.12% White, 1.26% African American, 2.17% American Indian & Alaska Native, 15.78% Asian, 11.29% Native Hawaiian & Pacific Islander, 1.12% from other races, and 32.26% from two or more races. Hispanic or Latino of any race were 15.29% of the population.

There were 520 households, out of which 27.5% had children under the age of 18 living with them. The average household size was 2.74.

In the CDP the population was spread out, with 25.1% under the age of 18, 9.5% from 18 to 24, 12.6% from 25 to 34, 18.7% from 35 to 49, 24.0% from 50 to 64, and 10.1% who were 65 years of age or older. For every 100 females, there were 95.3 males. For every 100 males there were 104.9 females.

The median income for a household in the CDP at the 2000 census was $35,703, and the median income for a family in 2000 was $36,875. Males had a median income of $21,250 in 2000 versus $24,531 for females. The per capita income for the CDP in 2000 was $11,524. About 28.9% of families and 31.0% of the population were below the poverty line in 2000, including 38.1% of those under age 18 and 8.7% of those age 65 or over.
