= Hawaiian Beaches, Hawaii =

Census-designated place in Hawaii, United States

Hawaiian Beaches, Hawaii Waiakahiʻula
- Census-designated place
- Location in Hawaii County and the state of Hawaii
- Coordinates: 19°32′57″N 154°54′27″W
- Country: United States
- State: Hawaii
- County: Hawaii

Area
  - Total: 15.22 sq mi (39.42 km^{2})
  - Land: 15.22 sq mi (39.42 km^{2})
  - Water: 0 sq mi (0.00 km^{2})
- Elevation: 256 ft (78 m)

Population (2020)
  - Total: 3,976
  - Density: 261.2/sq mi (100.86/km^{2})
- Time zone: UTC-10 (Hawaii-Aleutian)
- ZIP code: 96778
- Area code: 808
- FIPS code: 15-12500
- GNIS feature ID: 1867252

Hawaiian Beaches is a census-designated place (CDP) in Hawaiʻi County, Hawaiʻi, United States located in the District of Puna. As of the 2020 census, Hawaiian Beaches had a population of 3,976. Its Hawaiian name is Waiakahiʻula.

== Geography ==
Hawaiian Beaches is located on the east side of the island of Hawaii at 19°32′57″N 154°54′27″W (19.549247, -154.907587). It is bordered to the north by Hawaiian Paradise Park, to the south by Pahoa and Nanawale Estates, and to the east by the Pacific Ocean. Hawaii Route 130 forms the western border of the community and leads north 18 miles (29 km) to Hilo.

According to the United States Census Bureau, the CDP has a total area of 24.9 square miles (64.5 km^{2}), of which 24.5 square miles (63.5 km^{2}) are land and 0.39 square miles (1.0 km^{2}), or 1.50%, are water.

== Demographics ==
Historical population
Census	Pop.	Note	%±
2020	3,976		—
U.S. Decennial Census

=== 2020 census ===
As of the 2020 census, Hawaiian Beaches had a population of 3,976. The median age was 46.8 years. 21.4% of residents were under the age of 18 and 24.3% of residents were 65 years of age or older. For every 100 females there were 101.5 males, and for every 100 females age 18 and over there were 98.3 males age 18 and over.

0.0% of residents lived in urban areas, while 100.0% lived in rural areas.

There were 1,509 households in Hawaiian Beaches, of which 28.2% had children under the age of 18 living in them. Of all households, 41.5% were married-couple households, 21.1% were households with a male householder and no spouse or partner present, and 28.8% were households with a female householder and no spouse or partner present. About 28.3% of all households were made up of individuals and 14.4% had someone living alone who was 65 years of age or older.

There were 1,783 housing units, of which 15.4% were vacant. The homeowner vacancy rate was 2.2% and the rental vacancy rate was 7.2%.

Racial composition as of the 2020 census
Race	Number	Percent
White	1,427	35.9%
Black or African American	27	0.7%
American Indian and Alaska Native	34	0.9%
Asian	437	11.0%
Native Hawaiian and Other Pacific Islander	628	15.8%
Some other race	87	2.2%
Two or more races	1,336	33.6%
Hispanic or Latino (of any race)	684	17.2%

=== 2000 census ===
As of the census of 2000, there were 3,709 people, 1,192 households, and 923 families residing in the CDP. The population density was 145.8 inhabitants per square mile (56.3/km^{2}). There were 1,383 housing units at an average density of 54.4 per square mile (21.0/km^{2}). The racial makeup of the CDP was 27.99% White, 0.65% African American, 0.49% Native American, 16.69% Asian, 15.45% Pacific Islander, 1.05% from other races, and 37.69% from two or more races. Hispanic or Latino of any race were 15.64% of the population.

There were 1,192 households, out of which 37.0% had children under the age of 18 living with them, 54.3% were married couples living together, 17.6% had a female householder with no husband present, and 22.5% were non-families. 17.5% of all households were made up of individuals, and 6.4% had someone living alone who was 65 years of age or older. The average household size was 3.11 and the average family size was 3.49.

In the CDP the population was spread out, with 31.7% under the age of 18, 8.5% from 18 to 24, 24.2% from 25 to 44, 24.5% from 45 to 64, and 11.2% who were 65 years of age or older. The median age was 34 years. For every 100 females, there were 98.9 males. For every 100 females age 18 and over, there were 96.7 males.

The median income for a household in the CDP was $28,467, and the median income for a family was $30,104. Males had a median income of $30,037 versus $21,886 for females. The per capita income for the CDP was $11,267. About 23.8% of families and 28.6% of the population were below the poverty line, including 38.3% of those under age 18 and 13.8% of those age 65 or over.
