= Orchidlands Estates, Hawaii =

Census-designated place in Hawaii, U.S.

- Census-designated place
- Location in Hawaii County and the state of Hawaii
- Coordinates: 19°33′39″N 155°0′45″W
- Country: United States
- State: Hawaii
- County: Hawaii

Area
  - Total: 9.71 sq mi (25.14 km^{2})
  - Land: 9.71 sq mi (25.14 km^{2})
  - Water: 0 sq mi (0.00 km^{2})
- Elevation: 518 ft (158 m)

Population (2020)
  - Total: 3,165
  - Density: 326.1/sq mi (125.89/km^{2})
- Time zone: UTC-10 (Hawaii-Aleutian)
- Area code: 808
- FIPS code: 15-58775
- GNIS feature ID: 1852582

Orchidlands Estates (also known as Orchidland or Orchid Land Estates) is a census-designated place (CDP) in Hawaiʻi County, Hawaiʻi, United States located in the District of Puna. As of the 2020 census, Orchidlands Estates had a population of 3,165.

== Geography ==
Orchidlands Estates is located on the east side of the island of Hawaii at 19°33′39″N 155°0′45″W (19.560858, -155.012566). It is bordered to the northeast by Hawaiian Paradise Park, to the south by Ainaloa, to the southwest by Hawaiian Acres, and to the northwest by Kurtistown. It is 14 miles (23 km) south of Hilo.

According to the United States Census Bureau, the CDP has a total area of 9.7 square miles (25.1 km^{2}), all of it land.

== Demographics ==
Historical population
Census	Pop.	Note	%±
2020	3,165		—
U.S. Decennial Census

=== 2020 census ===
As of the 2020 census, Orchidlands Estates had a population of 3,165. The median age was 44.5 years. 19.6% of residents were under the age of 18 and 19.3% of residents were 65 years of age or older. For every 100 females there were 103.9 males, and for every 100 females age 18 and over there were 104.0 males age 18 and over.

0.0% of residents lived in urban areas, while 100.0% lived in rural areas.

There were 1,178 households in Orchidlands Estates, of which 30.6% had children under the age of 18 living in them. Of all households, 48.5% were married-couple households, 24.4% were households with a male householder and no spouse or partner present, and 18.6% were households with a female householder and no spouse or partner present. About 24.5% of all households were made up of individuals and 11.6% had someone living alone who was 65 years of age or older.

There were 1,264 housing units, of which 6.8% were vacant. The homeowner vacancy rate was 0.6% and the rental vacancy rate was 7.6%.

Racial composition as of the 2020 census
Race	Number	Percent
White	1,087	34.3%
Black or African American	22	0.7%
American Indian and Alaska Native	17	0.5%
Asian	677	21.4%
Native Hawaiian and Other Pacific Islander	379	12.0%
Some other race	55	1.7%
Two or more races	928	29.3%
Hispanic or Latino (of any race)	361	11.4%

=== 2010 census ===
As of the census of 2010, there were 2,815 people in 1,011 households residing in the CDP. The population density was 296.3 inhabitants per square mile (114.4/km^{2}). There were 1,139 housing units at an average density of 119.9 per square mile (46.3/km^{2}). The racial makeup of the CDP was 32.01% White, 0.82% African American, 0.64% American Indian & Alaska Native, 21.74% Asian, 10.98% Native Hawaiian & Pacific Islander, 1.74% from other races, and 32.08% from two or more races. Hispanic or Latino of any race were 14.67% of the population.

There were 1,011 households, out of which 28.0% had children under the age of 18 living with them. The average household size was 2.78.

In the Orchidlands Estates CDP the population was spread out, with 25.2% under the age of 18, 10.1% from 18 to 24, 13.2% from 25 to 34, 18.3% from 35 to 49, 24.3% from 50 to 64, and 8.9% who were 65 years of age or older. For every 100 females, there were 104.1 males. For every 100 males there were 96.0 females.

=== 2000 census ===
The median income for a household in the CDP at the 2000 census was $27,083, and the median income for a family in 2000 was $31,290. Males had a median income of $32,045 in 2000 versus $24,188 for females. The per capita income for the CDP in 2000 was $13,748. About 24.1% of families and 27.6% of the population were below the poverty line in 2000, including 38.8% of those under age 18 and 18.9% of those age 65 or over.
