= Hawaiian Acres, Hawaii =

Census-designated place in Hawaii, United States

- Census-designated place
- Location in Hawaii County and the state of Hawaii
- Coordinates: 19°32′56″N 155°3′21″W
- Country: United States
- State: Hawaii
- County: Hawaii

Area
  - Total: 19.43 sq mi (50.33 km^{2})
  - Land: 19.43 sq mi (50.33 km^{2})
  - Water: 0 sq mi (0.00 km^{2})
- Elevation: 1,014 ft (309 m)

Population (2020)
  - Total: 3,426
  - Density: 176.3/sq mi (68.07/km^{2})
- Time zone: UTC-10 (Hawaii-Aleutian)
- Area code: 808
- FIPS code: 15-12450
- GNIS feature ID: 1852579

Hawaiian Acres is a census-designated place (CDP) in Hawaiʻi County, Hawaiʻi, United States located in the District of Puna. As of the 2020 census, Hawaiian Acres had a population of 3,426.

== Geography ==
Hawaiian Acres is located on the eastern side of the island of Hawaii at 19°32′56″N 155°3′21″W (19.548868, -155.055861). It is bordered to the east by Ainaloa and Orchidlands Estates, to the north by Kurtistown, to the northwest by Mountain View, and to the west by Fern Acres. To the south is the Puna Forest Reserve. The community is 15 miles (24 km) south of Hilo.

According to the United States Census Bureau, the CDP has a total area of 19.4 square miles (50.3 km^{2}), all of it land.

== Demographics ==
Historical population
Census	Pop.	Note	%±
2020	3,426		—
U.S. Decennial Census

=== 2020 census ===
As of the 2020 census, Hawaiian Acres had a population of 3,426. The median age was 44.1 years. 21.3% of residents were under the age of 18 and 19.1% of residents were 65 years of age or older. For every 100 females, there were 106.6 males, and for every 100 females age 18 and over, there were 108.1 males age 18 and over.

0.0% of residents lived in urban areas, while 100.0% lived in rural areas.

There were 1,382 households in Hawaiian Acres, of which 25.3% had children under the age of 18 living in them. Of all households, 42.8% were married-couple households, 28.1% were households with a male householder and no spouse or partner present, and 19.7% were households with a female householder and no spouse or partner present. About 28.7% of all households were made up of individuals, and 11.5% had someone living alone who was 65 years of age or older.

There were 1,569 housing units, of which 11.9% were vacant. The homeowner vacancy rate was 0.6% and the rental vacancy rate was 5.5%.

Racial composition as of the 2020 census
Race	Number	Percent
White	1,832	53.5%
Black or African American	35	1.0%
American Indian and Alaska Native	27	0.8%
Asian	242	7.1%
Native Hawaiian and Other Pacific Islander	433	12.6%
Some other race	70	2.0%
Two or more races	787	23.0%
Hispanic or Latino (of any race)	334	9.7%

=== 2000 census ===
As of the census of 2000, there were 1,776 people, 698 households, and 423 families residing in the CDP. The population density was 92.3 inhabitants per square mile (35.6/km^{2}). There were 843 housing units at an average density of 43.8 per square mile (16.9/km^{2}). The racial makeup of the CDP was 51.01% White, 1.41% African American, 0.62% Native American, 9.85% Asian, 8.67% Pacific Islander, 1.35% from other races, and 27.08% from two or more races. Hispanic or Latino of any race were 9.85% of the population.

There were 698 households, out of which 33.1% had children under the age of 18 living with them, 40.7% were married couples living together, 11.7% had a female householder with no husband present, and 39.3% were non-families. 30.5% of all households were made up of individuals, and 3.0% had someone living alone who was 65 years of age or older. The average household size was 2.54 and the average family size was 3.22.

In the CDP, the population was spread out, with 28.9% under the age of 18, 6.3% from 18 to 24, 29.7% from 25 to 44, 28.5% from 45 to 64, and 6.6% who were 65 years of age or older. The median age was 38 years. For every 100 females, there were 110.2 males. For every 100 females age 18 and over, there were 114.4 males.

The median income for a household in the CDP was $30,039, and the median income for a family was $35,726. Males had a median income of $30,385 versus $24,375 for females. The per capita income for the CDP was $16,242. About 22.5% of families and 28.1% of the population were below the poverty line, including 36.0% of those under age 18 and 22.0% of those age 65 or over.
