= ʻĀinaloa, Hawaii =

Census-designated place in Hawaii, US

ʻĀinaloa
- Census-designated place
- Location in Hawaiʻi County and the state of Hawaiʻi
- Coordinates: 19°31′33″N 154°59′38″W
- Country: United States
- State: Hawaiʻi
- County: Hawaiʻi

Area
  - Total: 1.98 sq mi (5.13 km^{2})
  - Land: 1.98 sq mi (5.13 km^{2})
  - Water: 0 sq mi (0.00 km^{2})
- Elevation: 705 ft (215 m)

Population (2020)
  - Total: 3,609
  - Density: 1,822.9/sq mi (703.81/km^{2})
- Time zone: UTC-10 (Hawaii-Aleutian)
- ZIP code: 96778
- Area code: 808
- FIPS code: 15-01085
- GNIS feature ID: 1852575

ʻĀinaloa is a census-designated place (CDP) in Hawaiʻi County, Hawaiʻi, United States, and is located in the District of Puna. The population was 3,609 at the 2020 census. The population had decreased to 2,965 at the 2010 census.

== Geography ==
ʻĀinaloa is located on the eastern side of the island of Hawaiʻi at 19°31′33″N 154°59′38″W (19.525819, -154.994022). It is bordered to the west by Hawaiian Acres, to the north by Orchidlands Estates, and to the northeast by Hawaiian Paradise Park. It is 15 miles (24 km) south of Hilo.

According to the United States Census Bureau, the CDP has a total area of 2.0 square miles (5.1 km^{2}), all of it land.

== Demographics ==
Historical population
Census	Pop.	Note	%±
2020	3,609		—
U.S. Decennial Census

At the 2010 census there were 2,965 people in 1,005 occupied households residing in the CDP. The population density was 1,647.2 per square mile (636.0/km^{2}). There were 1,165 housing units at an average density of 647.2 per square mile (249.9/km^{2}). The racial make-up was 28.8% White, 0.6% African American, 0.5% Native American & Alaska Native, 14.4% Asian, 14.7% Pacific Islander, 1.2% from other races and 39.8% from two or more races. Hispanic or Latino of any race were 19.0%.

Of the 1,005 households, 38.3% had children under the age of 18 living with them. The average household size was 2.95.

The age distribution was 30.6% under the age of 18, 8.8% from 18 to 24, 16.0% from 25 to 34, 19.3% 35 to 49, 17.2% from 50 to 64 and 8.1% 65 or older. For every 100 females, there were 102.7 males.

In 2000, the median household income was $25,698 and the median family income was $37,647. Males had a median income of $26,855 and females $26,518. The per capita income was $11,109. About 27.2% of families and 36.6% of the population were below the poverty line, including 46.9% of those under age 18 and 12.2% of those age 65 or over.
