= Hawaiʻi County, Hawaii =

County in Hawaii, United States

- County
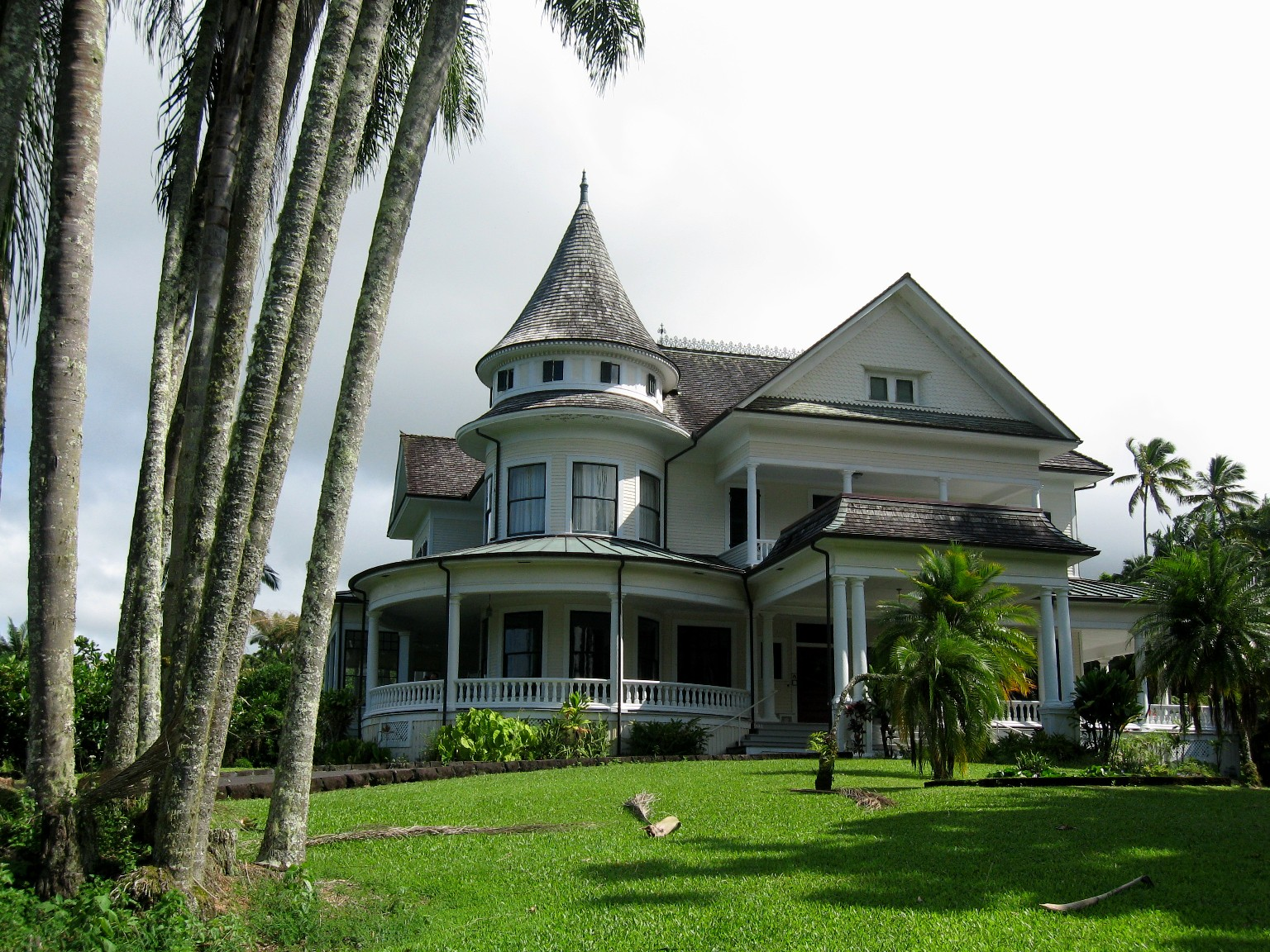
- W. H. Shipman House

- Seal

- Location within the U.S. state of Hawaii
- Coordinates: 19°35′N 155°30′W
- Country: United States
- State: Hawaii
- Founded: 1905
- Named for: Island of Hawaiʻi
- Seat: Hilo
- Largest community: Hilo

Government
  - Mayor: Kimo Alameda

Area
  - Total: 5,086.70 sq mi (13,174.5 km^{2})
  - Land: 4,028.02 sq mi (10,432.5 km^{2})
  - Water: 1,058.69 sq mi (2,742.0 km^{2}) 20.81%

Population (2020)
  - Total: 200,629
  - Estimate (2025): 210,043 ▲
  - Density: 49.8083/sq mi (19.2311/km^{2})
- Time zone: UTC−10 (Hawaii–Aleutian)
- ZIP Codes: 96704, 96710, 96719, 96720, 96721, 96725, 96726, 96727, 96728, 96737, 96738, 96740, 96743, 96749, 96750, 96755, 96760, 96764, 96771, 96772, 96773, 96774, 96776, 96777, 96778, 96780, 96781, 96783, 96785
- Area code: 808
- Congressional district: 2nd
- Website: www.hawaiicounty.gov

Hawaiʻi County (Hawaiian: Kalana o Hawaiʻi; officially known as the County of Hawaiʻi) is a county in the U.S. state of Hawaii in the Hawaiian Islands. It is coextensive with the Island of Hawaiʻi, often called the "Big Island" to distinguish it from the state as a whole. The 2020 Census population was 200,629. The county seat is Hilo. There are no incorporated cities in Hawaiʻi County (see list of counties in Hawaii). The Hilo Micropolitan Statistical Area includes all of Hawaiʻi County. Hawaiʻi County has a mayor–council form of government. In terms of geography, Hawaiʻi County is the most expansive county in the state and the most southerly county in the United States.

The mayor of Hawaiʻi County is Kimo Alameda, who took office in 2024. Legislative authority is vested in the nine-member Hawaiʻi County Council.

Hawaiʻi County is one of seven counties in the United States to share the same name as the state they are in (the other six are Arkansas, Idaho, Iowa, New York, Oklahoma, and Utah Counties).

== Geography ==
Hawaiʻi County has a total area of 5,086.70 square miles (13,174.5 km^{2}); 4,028.02 square miles (10,432.5 km^{2}) is land and 1,058.69 square miles (2,742.0 km^{2}) is water (mostly all off the ocean shoreline but counted in the total area by the U.S. Census Bureau). The county's land area comprises 62.7 percent of the state's land area. It is the highest percentage by any county in the United States. (Delaware's Sussex County comes in second at 48.0 percent, while Rhode Island's Providence County is third at 39.55 percent.)

=== Major highways ===
- Route 11
- Route 19
- Route 130
- Route 132
- Route 137
- Route 190
- Route 200
- Route 250
- Route 270
- Route 2000

=== Adjacent county ===
- Maui County - northwest

== Demographics ==
Historical population
Census	Pop.	Note	%±
1900	46,843		—
1910	55,382		18.2%
1920	64,895		17.2%
1930	73,325		13.0%
1940	73,276		−0.1%
1950	68,350		−6.7%
1960	61,332		−10.3%
1970	63,468		3.5%
1980	92,053		45.0%
1990	120,317		30.7%
2000	148,677		23.6%
2010	185,079		24.5%
2020	200,629		8.4%
2025 (est.)	210,043	▲	4.7%

Hawaii County, Hawaii – racial and ethnic composition Note: the US Census treats Hispanic/Latino as an ethnic category. This table excludes Latinos from the racial categories and assigns them to a separate category. Hispanics/Latinos may be of any race.
Race / Ethnicity (NH = Non-Hispanic)	2020	2010	2000	1990	1980
White alone (NH)	32.2% (64,688)	31.2% (57,831)	29.7% (44,223)	36.9% (44,421)	32% (29,501)
Black alone (NH)	0.6% (1,159)	0.5% (899)	0.4% (602)	0.5% (566)	0.3% (258)
American Indian alone (NH)	0.3% (649)	0.3% (586)	0.3% (476)	0.5% (661)	0.3% (286)
Asian alone (NH)	19.1% (38,351)	21.4% (39,588)	25.8% (38,378)	52.5% (63,185)	58.1% (53,449)
Pacific Islander alone (NH)	13.1% (26,185)	11.3% (20,970)	10.6% (15,691)		
Other race alone (NH)	0.5% (1,000)	0.2% (281)	0.2% (265)	0.3% (350)	0.3% (298)
Multiracial (NH)	23.1% (46,322)	23.5% (43,541)	23.5% (34,931)	—	—
Hispanic/Latino (any race)	11.1% (22,275)	11.6% (21,383)	9.5% (14,111)	9.3% (11,134)	9% (8,261)

=== 2020 census ===
As of the 2020 census, the county had a population of 200,629, 73,021 households, and 88,691 housing units. Of the residents, 20.9% were under the age of 18 and 22.7% were 65 years of age or older; the median age was 44.3 years, with men being 43.6 and women being 45. For every 100 females there were 99.6 males, and for every 100 females age 18 and over there were 97.9 males. 40.5% of residents lived in urban areas and 59.5% lived in rural areas.

The racial makeup of the county was 33.6% White, 0.6% Black or African American, 0.5% American Indian and Alaska Native, 19.7% Asian, 14.0% Native Hawaiian and Pacific Islander, 2.0% from some other race, and 29.5% from two or more races. Hispanic or Latino residents of any race comprised 11.1% of the population.

There were 73,021 households in the county, of which 29.0% had children under the age of 18 living with them and 24.8% had a female householder with no spouse or partner present. About 25.2% of all households were made up of individuals and 12.9% had someone living alone who was 65 years of age or older. There were 88,691 housing units, of which 17.7% were vacant. Among occupied housing units, 69.5% were owner-occupied and 30.5% were renter-occupied. The homeowner vacancy rate was 2.0% and the rental vacancy rate was 9.6%. The most commonly reported ancestries were Native Hawaiian (29.6%), Filipino (20.8%), Japanese (16.9%), German (13.1%), English (12.5%), and Irish (11.9%).

=== 2010 census ===
As of 2010, the island had a resident population of 185,079. There were 64,382 households in the county. The population density was 17.7/km^{2} (46/mi^{2}). There were 82,324 housing units at an average density of 8/km^{2} (21/mi^{2}). The racial makeup of the county was 34.5% White, 29.2% from two or more races, 22.6% Asian, 12.4% Native Hawaiian or other Pacific Islander and 0.7% African American; 11.8% of the population were Hispanics or Latinos of any race. The largest ancestry groups were:

- 9.8% Japanese
- 9.6% German
- 8.6% Filipino
- 8.5% Native Hawaiian
- 8.3% Portuguese
- 6.9% Irish
- 5.7% English
- 5.1% Puerto Rican
- 3.2% Mexican
- 2.5% French
- 2.2% Italian
- 1.9% Spanish
- 1.7% Scottish
- 1.5% Scotch-Irish
- 1.5% Swedish
- 1.1% Polish
- 1.1% Dutch
- 1.0% Norwegian

There were 64,382 households, out of which 32.2% had children under the age of 18 living with them, 50.6% were married couples living together, 13.2% had a woman whose husband did not live with her, and 30.4% were non-families. 23.1% of all households were made up of individuals, and 8.0% had someone living alone who was 65 years of age or older. The average household size was 2.75 and the average family size was 3.24.

The age distribution was 26.1% under 18, 8.2% from 18 to 24, 26.2% from 25 to 44, 26.0% from 45 to 64, and 13.5% who were 65 or older. The median age was 39 years. For every 100 females, there were 100 males. For every 100 females age 18 and over, there were 98 males.

41.3% of the people on Hawaii island were religious, meaning they affiliated with a religion. 18.4% were Roman Catholic; 5.1% adhered to the LDS; 3.7% to another Christian faith; 5.0% to an Eastern faith; and 0.1% were Muslim.

== Government and infrastructure ==
United States Senate election results for Hawai'i County, Hawaii1
Year	Republican		Democratic		Third party(ies)	
Year	No.	%	No.	%	No.	%
2024	22,747	28.61%	54,691	68.78%	2,079	2.61%
2018	15,031	25.75%	43,348	74.25%	0	0.00%
2012	19,491	31.00%	43,383	69.00%	0	0.00%

United States Senate election results for Hawaii County, Hawaii3
Year	Republican		Democratic		Third party(ies)	
Year	No.	%	No.	%	No.	%
2022	15,156	23.97%	46,096	72.89%	1,988	3.14%
2016	12,766	20.26%	47,003	74.59%	3,246	5.15%
2014	11,093	22.88%	35,509	73.24%	1,881	3.88%
2010	10,684	20.45%	39,001	74.67%	2,547	4.88%

=== County government ===
Executive authority is vested in the mayor of Hawaiʻi County, who is elected for a four-year term. Since 2004, the election by the voters has been on a nonpartisan basis. In 2024, Kimo Alameda was elected mayor, defeating Mitch Roth in the general election. Legislative authority is vested in a nine-member County Council. Members of the County Council are elected on a nonpartisan basis to two-year terms from single-member districts. As of December 2016, Hawaiʻi County Council has a female supermajority for the first time, with six women and three men.

Administrative districts were originally based on the traditional land divisions called Moku of Ancient Hawaii. Some more heavily populated districts have since been split into North and South districts to make them more comparable on a population basis.

The number following each district is the Tax Map Key (TMK) number, used to locate state property information. They are assigned in a counter-clockwise order beginning on the eastern side of the island.

Nr.	District	Area mi^{2}	Population 2000	moku	Map	
1	Puna	499.45	31,335	Puna	Map	District subdivision of Hawaiʻi County
2	South Hilo	394.38	47,386	Hilo	Map	District subdivision of Hawaiʻi County
3	North Hilo	370.65	1,720	Hilo	Map	District subdivision of Hawaiʻi County
4	Hāmākua	580.50	6,108	Hāmākua	Map	District subdivision of Hawaiʻi County
5	North Kohala	132.92	6,038	Kohala	Map	District subdivision of Hawaiʻi County
6	South Kohala	351.72	13,131	Kohala	Map	District subdivision of Hawaiʻi County
7	North Kona	489.01	28,543	Kona	Map	District subdivision of Hawaiʻi County
8	South Kona	335.38	8,589	Kona	Map	District subdivision of Hawaiʻi County
9	Kaʻū	922.22	5,827	Kaʻū	Map	District subdivision of Hawaiʻi County
	Hawaiʻi County	4028.02	148,677	6 moku		District subdivision of Hawaiʻi County

County council districts do not directly match the property tax districts because of the variation in the population density of voters in urban areas to rural areas; Hilo & Kailua (Kailua-Kona) towns are densely populated areas, while other districts such as Kaʻū, Puna, Hāmākua, and North & South Kohala are more sparsely populated.

Several government functions are administered at the county level that are at the state or municipal level in other states. For example, the county has its own office of liquor control.

Gubernatorial election results for Hawai'i County, Hawaii
Year	Republican		Democratic		Third party(ies)	
Year	No.	%	No.	%	No.	%
2022	21,870	34.16%	42,152	65.84%	0	0.00%
2018	17,953	30.63%	38,301	65.34%	2,363	4.03%
2014	15,387	30.89%	25,674	51.54%	8,751	17.57%
2010	19,807	37.10%	33,095	61.99%	484	0.91%

=== State government ===
Hawaii Department of Public Safety previously operated the Kulani Correctional Facility in Hawaiʻi County, on the Island of Hawaii. In 2009, the Hawaii Department of Public Safety announced that Kulani Correctional Facility would close.

United States presidential election results for Hawaii County, Hawaii
Year	Republican		Democratic		Third party(ies)	
Year	No.	%	No.	%	No.	%
1960	12,251	51.46%	11,557	48.54%	0	0.00%
1964	4,962	19.87%	20,011	80.13%	0	0.00%
1968	9,625	37.41%	15,819	61.49%	283	1.10%
1972	16,832	59.09%	11,652	40.91%	0	0.00%
1976	15,366	48.37%	15,960	50.24%	439	1.38%
1980	14,247	39.73%	17,630	49.16%	3,984	11.11%
1984	20,707	52.90%	17,866	45.64%	570	1.46%
1988	17,125	41.00%	24,091	57.68%	552	1.32%
1992	15,460	30.36%	25,725	50.52%	9,731	19.11%
1996	13,516	27.60%	27,262	55.66%	8,199	16.74%
2000	17,050	33.52%	28,670	56.37%	5,140	10.11%
2004	22,032	38.18%	35,116	60.86%	554	0.96%
2008	14,866	22.22%	50,819	75.94%	1,231	1.84%
2012	14,753	23.25%	47,224	74.42%	1,477	2.33%
2016	17,501	26.98%	41,259	63.61%	6,107	9.41%
2020	26,897	30.63%	58,731	66.88%	2,186	2.49%
2024	28,748	34.71%	52,163	62.98%	1,912	2.31%

== Localities ==
=== Census-designated places ===
- ʻĀinaloa
- Black Sands
- Captain Cook
- Discovery Harbour
- Eden Roc
- Fern Acres
- Fern Forest
- Halaʻula
- Hawaiian Acres
- Hawaiian Beaches
- Hawaiian Ocean View
- Hawaiian Paradise Park
- Hāwī
- Hilo
- Hōlualoa
- Honalo
- Hōnaunau-Nāpōʻopoʻo
- Honokaʻa
- Honomū
- Kahaluʻu-Keauhou
- Kailua
- Kaiminani
- Kalapana
- Kaloko
- Kamāʻili
- Kapaʻau
- Keaʻau
- Kealakekua
- Kukuihaele
- Kurtistown
- Laupāhoehoe
- Leilani Estates
- Mountain View
- Nāʻālehu
- Nānāwale Estates
- Orchidlands Estates
- Paʻauilo
- Pāhala
- Pāhoa
- Pāpaʻikou
- Paukaʻa
- Pepeʻekeo
- Puakō
- Royal Hawaiian Estates
- Seaview
- Tiki Gardens
- Volcano
- Volcano Golf Course
- Waikoloa Beach Resort
- Waikoloa Village
- Waimea (Kamuela)
- Wainaku
- Waiʻōhinu

=== Other communities ===
- ʻĀhualoa
- Hāʻena
- Hakalau
- Kainaliu
- Kalaoa
- Kawaihae
- Keālia
- Keauhou
- Kēōkea
- Miloliʻi
- Mauna Loa Estates
- Nīnole
- ʻŌʻōkala
- Pāʻauhau
- Pāpaʻaloa

=== National protected areas ===
- Ala Kahakai National Historic Trail
- Hakalau Forest National Wildlife Refuge
- Hawaiʻi Volcanoes National Park
- Kaloko-Honokōhau National Historical Park
- Kona Forest National Wildlife Refuge
- Puʻuhonua o Hōnaunau National Historical Park
- Puʻukoholā Heiau National Historic Site

=== State protected areas ===
- Puʻuwaʻawaʻa State Forest Reserve. 37,600 acres state park overseen by the Hawaii Division of Forestry and Wildlife (DOFAW).
- Puʻuwaʻawaʻa Forest Bird Sanctuary.
- Upper Waiākea Forest Reserve. 53,214 acre reserve designated October 13, 1913.
- 180 acre Kealakekua Bay State Historical Park.

== Economy ==
=== Top employers ===
According to the county's 2021 Annual Comprehensive Financial Report, the top employers in the county are the following:

#	Employer	# of Employees
1	State of Hawaii	16,700
2	Kamehameha Schools Hawaiʻi Campus	3,380
3	Hawaiʻi County	2,800
4	United States Government	1,300
5	Mauna Kea Beach Hotel	1,100
6	Four Seasons Resort Hualalai	1,003
7	KTA Super Stores	900
8	Hilton Waikoloa Village	850
9	The Fairmont Orchid	560
10	Waikoloa Beach Marriott Resort	259

== Education ==
- University of Hawaiʻi at Hilo
- University of the Nations
- Hawaiʻi Community College

The Hawaii State Department of Education operates public schools in Hawaiʻi County.

== Sister cities ==
Hawaiʻi County's sister cities, counties and islands are:

- Cabugao, Philippines (2017)
- Gokseong County, South Korea (2011)
- Hatsukaichi, Japan (2024)
- Hualien County, Taiwan (1971)
- Kumejima Island, Japan (2011)
- Nago, Japan (1986)
- Ormoc, Philippines (2011)
- Izu Ōshima Island, Japan (1962)
- Réunion Island, France (2012)
- La Serena, Chile (1994)
- Shibukawa, Japan (1997) [originally Ikaho]
- Sumoto, Japan (2000)
- Yurihama, Japan (1996) [originally Hawai-cho]
