= Keaʻau, Hawaii =

Census-designated place in Hawaii, U.S.

Keaʻau
- Census-designated place
- Location in Hawaiʻi County and the state of Hawaii
- Coordinates: 19°37′16″N 155°2′30″W
- Country: United States
- State: Hawaii
- County: Hawaiʻi

Area
  - Total: 6.27 sq mi (16.25 km^{2})
  - Land: 6.27 sq mi (16.25 km^{2})
  - Water: 0 sq mi (0.00 km^{2})
- Elevation: 341 ft (104 m)

Population (2020)
  - Total: 1,195
  - Density: 190.5/sq mi (73.56/km^{2})
- Time zone: UTC-10 (Hawaii-Aleutian)
- ZIP code: 96749
- Area code: 808
- FIPS code: 15-32900
- GNIS feature ID: 0360892

Keaʻau is a census-designated place (CDP) in Hawaiʻi County, Hawaii. located in the District of Puna. The population was 1,195 at the time of the 2020 census. The population decreased by roughly 50% from 2,253 at the time of the 2010 census.

== History ==
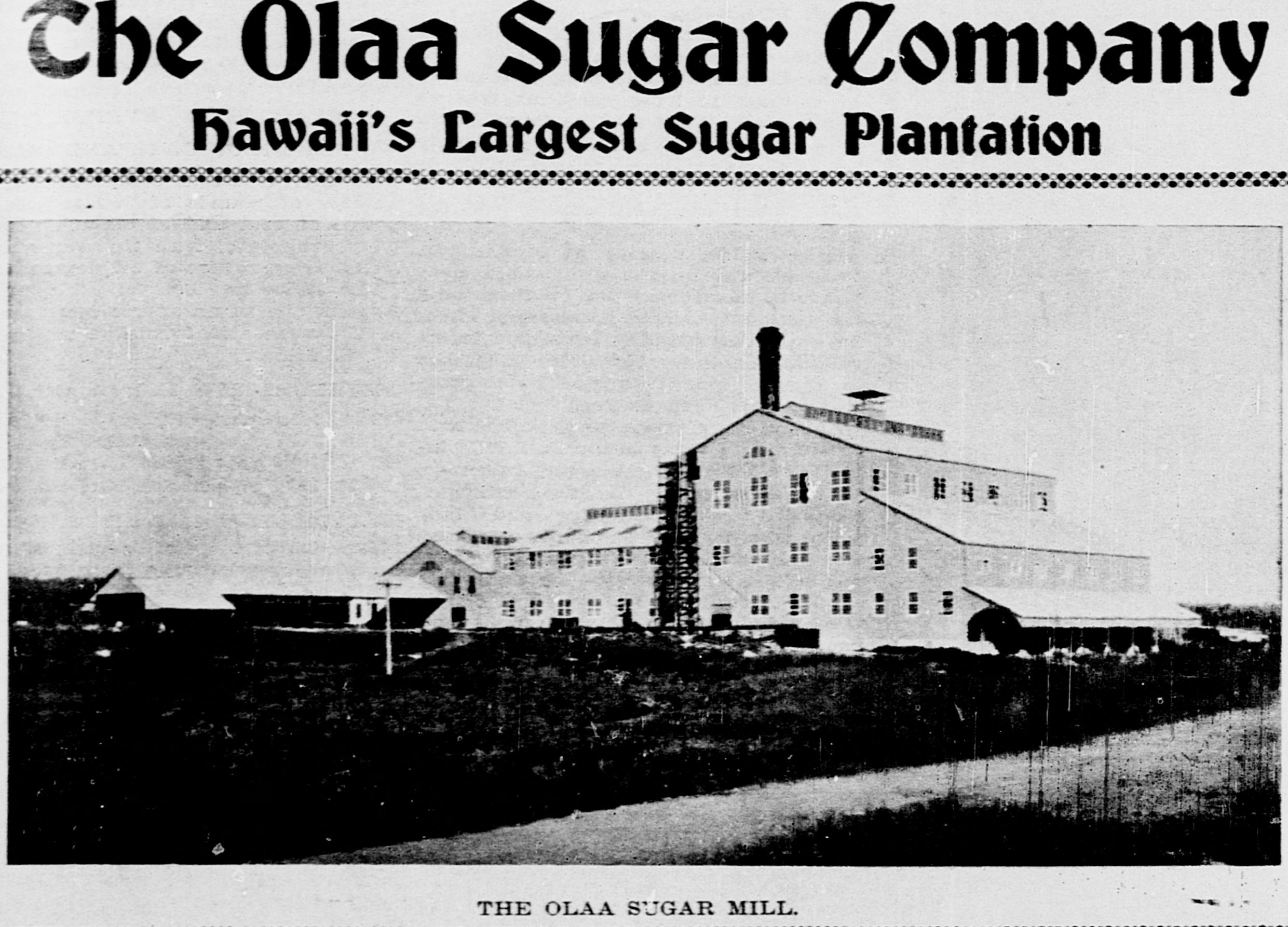
The Olaa Sugar Company was Hawaii's Largest Sugar Plantation (c. 1902)

Keaau was called ʻŌlaʻa and in 1899, the Olaa Sugar Company leased about 4,000 acres of land, for growing sugarcane.

== Geography ==
Keaʻau is on the east side of the island of Hawaiʻi at 19°37′16″N 155°2′30″W (19.621072, -155.041706). It is bordered to the southwest by Kurtistown. Hilo is 8 miles (13 km) to the north. The junction of Hawaii Route 11 (the Hawaii Belt Road) and Hawaii Route 130 (Keaau-Pahoa Road) is in the northern part of the community. According to the United States Census Bureau, the CDP has a total area of 2.6 square miles (6.7 km^{2}), all of it land.

The Board on Geographic Names officially designated the populated place as Keaʻau in 2003.

== Demographics ==
Historical population
Census	Pop.	Note	%±
2020	1,195		—
U.S. Decennial Census

=== 2010 Census data ===
At the 2010 census there were 2,253 people in 701 households residing in the CDP. The population density was 901.2 inhabitants per square mile (348.0/km^{2}). There were 757 housing units at an average density of 302.8 per square mile (116.9/km^{2}). The racial makeup of the CDP was 12.38% White, 0.22% African American, 0.18% American Indian & Alaska Native, 52.02% Asian, 7.50% Native Hawaiian & Pacific Islander, 0.44% from other races, and 27.25% from two or more races. Hispanic or Latino of any race were 8.74%.

Of the 701 households, 28.0% had children under the age of 18 living with them. The average household size was 3.21.

In the Keaʻau CDP the population was spread out, with 23.7% under the age of 18, 9.5% from 18 to 24, 9.6% from 25 to 34, 19.6 from 35 to 49, 20.4% from 50 to 64, and 17.2% 65 or older. For every 100 females, there were 99.6 males. For every 100 males there were 100.4 females.

The median household income was $39,722 and the median family income in 2000 was $43,347. Males had a median income in 2000 of $27,344 versus $23,287 for females. The per capita income for the CDP in 2000 was $14,657. About 9.6% of families and 12.3% of the population were below the poverty line in 2000, including 14.9% of those under age 18 and 9.0% of those age 65 or over.

== Education ==
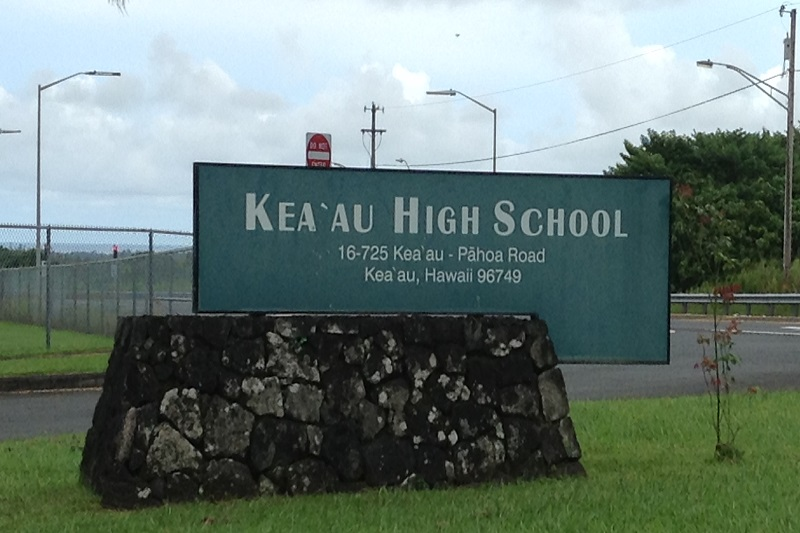
Keaʻau High School

The statewide school district is the Hawaii State Department of Education, and it covers Hawaii County. Area schools include:

- Keaʻau High School - Opened in 1999
- Keaʻau Middle School
- Keaʻau Elementary School

The Hawaii State Public Library System operates the Keaau Public and School Library.

== Points of interest ==
- Mauna Loa Macadamia Nut Corporation visitors center between Hilo and Keaʻau
