= Fern Forest, Hawaii =

Census-designated place in Hawaii, United States

- Census-designated place
- Location in Hawaii County and the state of Hawaii
- Coordinates: 19°28′20″N 155°7′48″W
- Country: United States
- State: Hawaii
- County: Hawaii

Area
  - Total: 12.47 sq mi (32.31 km^{2})
  - Land: 12.47 sq mi (32.31 km^{2})
  - Water: 0 sq mi (0.00 km^{2})
- Elevation: 2,260 ft (690 m)

Population (2020)
  - Total: 1,150
  - Density: 92/sq mi (35.6/km^{2})
- Time zone: UTC-10 (Hawaii-Aleutian)
- ZIP code: 96785
- Area code: 808
- FIPS code: 15-07675
- GNIS feature ID: 1852578

Fern Forest is a census-designated place (CDP) in Hawaiʻi County, Hawaiʻi, United States, located in the District of Puna. The population was 1,150 at the 2020 census. The population increased by 94.0% to 931 at the 2010 census.

== Geography ==
Fern Forest is located at 19°28′20″N 155°7′48″W (19.472132, -155.130135).

According to the United States Census Bureau, the CDP has a total area of 12.5 square miles (32 km^{2}), all of it land.

== Demographics ==
Historical population
Census	Pop.	Note	%±
2020	1,150		—
U.S. Decennial Census

=== 2020 census ===
As of the 2020 census, Fern Forest had a population of 1,150. The median age was 48.3 years. 17.4% of residents were under the age of 18 and 22.2% of residents were 65 years of age or older. For every 100 females there were 132.8 males, and for every 100 females age 18 and over there were 125.7 males age 18 and over.

0.0% of residents lived in urban areas, while 100.0% lived in rural areas.

There were 480 households in Fern Forest, of which 22.1% had children under the age of 18 living in them. Of all households, 34.4% were married-couple households, 27.5% were households with a male householder and no spouse or partner present, and 28.1% were households with a female householder and no spouse or partner present. About 35.0% of all households were made up of individuals and 16.9% had someone living alone who was 65 years of age or older.

There were 575 housing units, of which 16.5% were vacant. The homeowner vacancy rate was 3.3% and the rental vacancy rate was 1.3%.

Racial composition as of the 2020 census
Race	Number	Percent
White	608	52.9%
Black or African American	12	1.0%
American Indian and Alaska Native	21	1.8%
Asian	63	5.5%
Native Hawaiian and Other Pacific Islander	127	11.0%
Some other race	31	2.7%
Two or more races	288	25.0%
Hispanic or Latino (of any race)	148	12.9%

=== 2010 census ===
As of the census of 2010, there were 931 people and 399 households residing in the CDP. The population density was 74.5 inhabitants per square mile (28.8/km^{2}). There were 460 housing units at an average density of 23.1 units per square mile (8.9 units/km^{2}). The racial makeup of the CDP was 49.30% White, 0.75% African American, 0.86% American Indian & Alaska Native, 7.84% Asian, 10.63% Native Hawaiian & Pacific Islander, 0.64% from other races, and 29.97% from two or more races. Hispanic or Latino of any race were 13.53% of the population.

There were 399 households, out of which 20.1% had children under the age of 18 living with them. The average household size was 2.33.

In the CDP the population was spread out, with 21.4% under the age of 18, 7.5% from 18 to 24, 11.6% from 25 to 34, 19.4% from 35 to 49, 31.5% from 50 to 64, and 8.6% who were 65 years of age or older. For every 100 females, there were 117.5 males. For every 100 males there were 85.1 females.

=== 2000 census ===
The median income for a household in the CDP at the 2000 census was $24,519, and the median income for a family in 2000 was $33,125. Males had a median income of $40,125 versus $28,333 for females in 2000. The per capita income for the CDP was $14,958 in 2000. About 18.3% of families and 25.5% of the population were below the poverty line in 2000, including 10.3% of those under age 18 and 36.8% of those age 65 or over.
