= Volcano, Hawaii =

Census-designated place in Hawaii, U.S.

Volcano, Hawaii Volcano Village
- Census-designated place
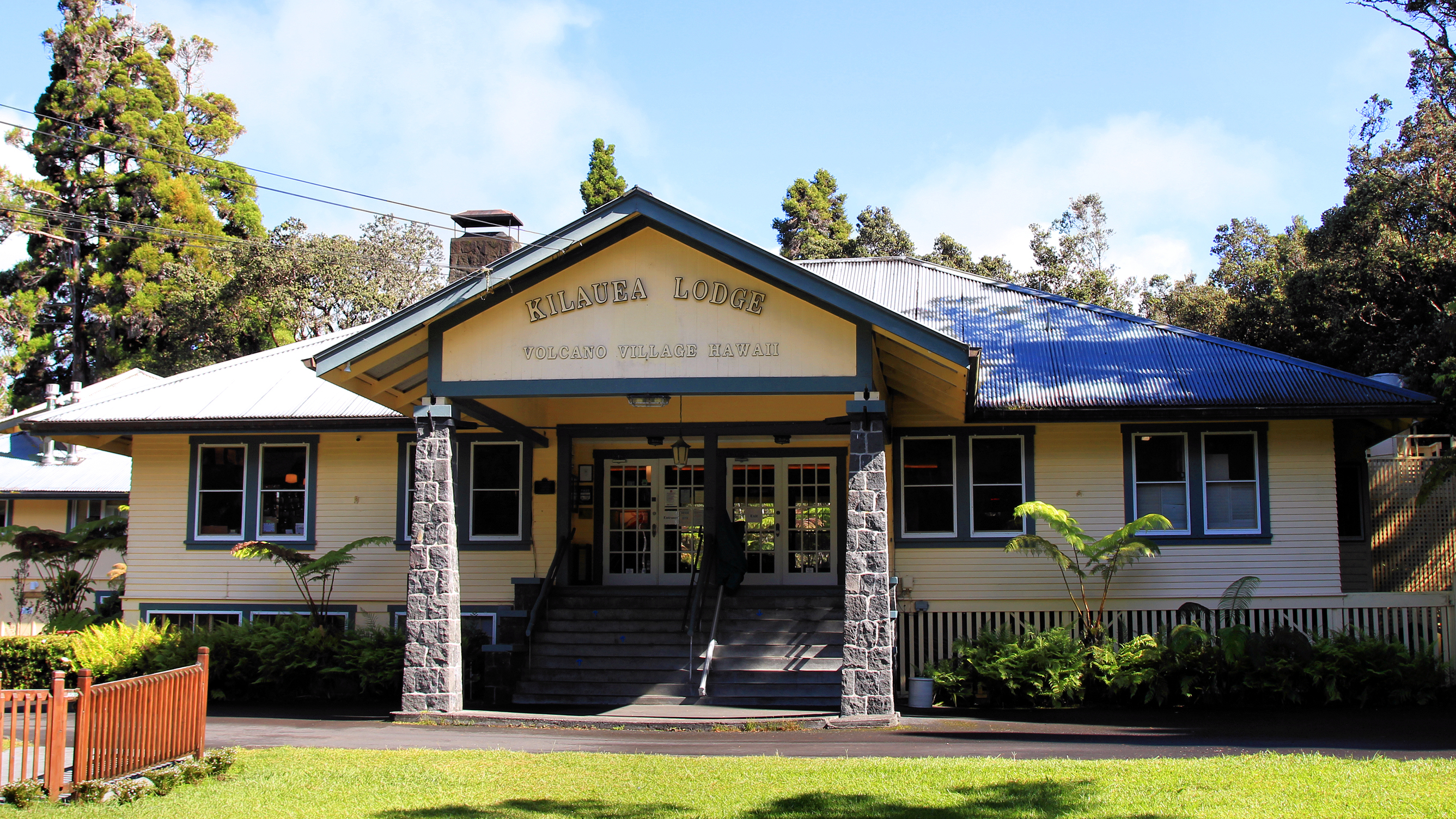
- The Kilauea Lodge in Volcano, Hawaii was built in 1938 as a YMCA camp.

- Location in Hawaii County and the state of Hawaii

- Location in Hawaii
- Coordinates: 19°26′59″N 155°14′8″W
- Country: United States
- State: Hawaii
- County: Hawaii

Area
  - Total: 58.6 sq mi (151.7 km^{2})
  - Land: 58.6 sq mi (151.7 km^{2})
  - Water: 0 sq mi (0.0 km^{2})
- Elevation: 3,750 ft (1,143 m)

Population (2010)
  - Total: 2,575
  - Density: 44/sq mi (17/km^{2})
- Time zone: UTC-10 (Hawaii-Aleutian)
- ZIP code: 96785
- Area code: 808
- FIPS code: 15-72350
- GNIS feature ID: 0364402

Volcano, or Volcano Village, is a census-designated place (CDP) in Hawaii County, Hawaii, United States located in the District of Puna with a small portion of the CDP in the District of Kaʻū. As of the 2020 census, Volcano had a population of 736.

== Geography and climate ==
Volcano is located on the east side of the island of Hawaiʻi, on the border of Hawaii Volcanoes National Park and near the northeast rim of Kīlauea's summit caldera.

According to the United States Census Bureau, the CDP has a total area of 58.6 square miles (151.7 km^{2}), all of it land. Hawaii Route 11 passes through the southern part of the community, leading northeast 27 miles (43 km) to Hilo and southwest 37 miles (60 km) to Nāʻālehu.

Its altitude ranges from below 2,800 feet (850 m) in the southeast to over 6,200 feet (1,900 m) at its uninhabited northern end. Due to this, Volcano features a subtropical highland climate (Köppen Cfb), with relatively uniform temperatures and abundant rainfall throughout the year, although rainfall is concentrated during the months of November through April.

Climate data for Hawaiʻi Volcanoes National Park Headquarters, Hawaii, 1991–2020 normals, extremes 1949–2015
Month	Jan	Feb	Mar	Apr	May	Jun	Jul	Aug	Sep	Oct	Nov	Dec	Year
Record high °F (°C)	79 (26)	82 (28)	80 (27)	81 (27)	81 (27)	83 (28)	87 (31)	84 (29)	85 (29)	81 (27)	80 (27)	81 (27)	87 (31)
Mean maximum °F (°C)	74.4 (23.6)	74.7 (23.7)	74.4 (23.6)	74.1 (23.4)	75.8 (24.3)	76.2 (24.6)	78.0 (25.6)	78.8 (26.0)	77.8 (25.4)	77.7 (25.4)	76.1 (24.5)	75.0 (23.9)	80.5 (26.9)
Mean daily maximum °F (°C)	68.3 (20.2)	68.2 (20.1)	67.5 (19.7)	68.3 (20.2)	70.5 (21.4)	71.3 (21.8)	72.7 (22.6)	73.7 (23.2)	73.2 (22.9)	72.4 (22.4)	70.3 (21.3)	68.2 (20.1)	70.4 (21.3)
Daily mean °F (°C)	58.8 (14.9)	58.7 (14.8)	59.1 (15.1)	60.1 (15.6)	61.8 (16.6)	62.8 (17.1)	64.1 (17.8)	64.8 (18.2)	64.3 (17.9)	63.7 (17.6)	62.1 (16.7)	59.9 (15.5)	61.7 (16.5)
Mean daily minimum °F (°C)	49.4 (9.7)	49.3 (9.6)	50.7 (10.4)	51.9 (11.1)	53.0 (11.7)	54.3 (12.4)	55.6 (13.1)	56.0 (13.3)	55.4 (13.0)	55.1 (12.8)	54.0 (12.2)	51.7 (10.9)	53.0 (11.7)
Mean minimum °F (°C)	42.6 (5.9)	42.2 (5.7)	44.3 (6.8)	45.9 (7.7)	47.6 (8.7)	49.5 (9.7)	50.3 (10.2)	50.7 (10.4)	50.0 (10.0)	49.5 (9.7)	47.7 (8.7)	44.2 (6.8)	40.6 (4.8)
Record low °F (°C)	34 (1)	35 (2)	38 (3)	40 (4)	42 (6)	42 (6)	45 (7)	41 (5)	45 (7)	45 (7)	41 (5)	35 (2)	34 (1)
Average precipitation inches (mm)	8.77 (223)	8.15 (207)	10.27 (261)	9.16 (233)	6.46 (164)	5.10 (130)	6.29 (160)	5.91 (150)	5.98 (152)	8.19 (208)	10.59 (269)	11.37 (289)	96.24 (2,444)
Average precipitation days (≥ 0.01 in)	21.9	20.4	25.3	26.3	25.1	25.4	25.8	25.3	23.9	24.5	26.3	25.0	295.2
Source 1: NOAA
Source 2: WRCC (mean maxima/minima 1981–2010)

== Demographics ==
=== 2010 census ===
As of the census of 2010, there were 2,575 people in 1,228 households residing in the CDP. The population density was 45.4 inhabitants per square mile (17.5/km^{2}). There were 1,740 housing units at an average density of 30.7 per square mile (11.9/km^{2}). The racial makeup of the CDP was 51.53% White, 0.74% African American, 0.39% American Indian & Alaska Native, 11.57% Asian, 9.79% Native Hawaiian & Pacific Islander, 0.43% from other races, and 25.55% from two or more races. Hispanic or Latino residents of any race were 8.82% of the population.

There were 1,228 households, out of which 17.6% had children under the age of 18 living with them. The average household size was 2.10.

In the Volcano CDP, 17.3% of the population was under the age of 18, 5.4% from 18 to 24, 8.8% from 25 to 34, 16.4% from 35 to 49, 34.6% from 50 to 64, and 17.5% was 65 years of age or older. For every 100 females, there were 99.3 males. For every 100 males there were 100.7 females.

=== 2000 census ===
As of the census of 2000, there were 2,231 people, 896 households, and 498 families residing in the CDP. The population density was 39.4 inhabitants per square mile (15.2/km^{2}). There were 1,229 housing units at an average density of 21.7 per square mile (8.4/km^{2}). The racial makeup of the CDP was 47.87% White, 0.49% African American, 0.54% Native American, 11.39% Asian, 12.24% Pacific Islander, 1.34% from other races, and 26.13% from two or more races. Hispanic or Latino residents of any race were 9.28% of the population.

There were 896 households, out of which 24.6% had children under the age of 18 living with them, 41.4% were married couples living together, 9.5% had a female householder with no husband present, and 44.4% were non-families. 34.7% of all households were made up of individuals, and 7.5% had someone living alone who was 65 years of age or older. The average household size was 2.25 and the average family size was 2.92.

In the CDP, 20.3% of the population was under the age of 18, 6.7% from 18 to 24, 30.7% from 25 to 44, 30.3% from 45 to 64, and 11.9% was 65 years of age or older. The median age was 41 years. For every 100 females, there were 116.2 males. For every 100 females age 18 and over, there were 125.2 males.

The median income for a household in the CDP was $35,977, and the median income for a family was $44,432. Males had a median income of $30,929 versus $31,679 for females. The per capita income for the CDP was $18,913. About 10.4% of families and 14.3% of the population were below the poverty line, including 15.0% of those under age 18 and 2.3% of those age 65 or over.

== Notable residents ==
- Jason Scott Lee – American actor and martial artist (born 1966)
