= List of counties in Hawaii =

Counties of Hawaii
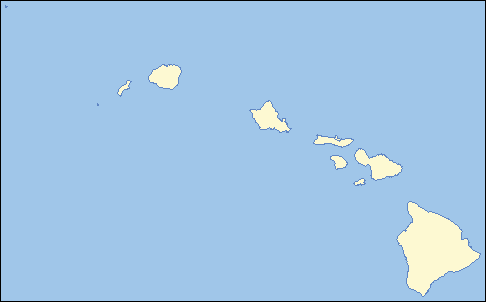
- Location: State of Hawaii
- Number: 5
- Populations: 82 (Kalawao) – 988,703 (Honolulu)
- Areas: 5.2 square miles (13 km^{2}) (Kalawao) – 4,028 square miles (10,430 km^{2}) (Hawaii)
- Government: County government
- Subdivisions: Communities

The five counties of Hawaii on the Hawaiian Islands enjoy somewhat greater status than many counties on the United States mainland. Counties in Hawaii are the only legally constituted government bodies below that of the state. No formal level of government (such as city governments) exists below that of the county in Hawaii.

Unlike the other 49 states, Hawaii does not delegate educational responsibility to local school boards; public education is carried out by the Hawaii State Department of Education. Hawaiian counties collect property taxes and user fees in order to support road maintenance, community activities, parks (including life guards at beach parks), garbage collection, police (the state police force, called the Hawaii Department of Public Safety, is limited in scope), ambulance, and fire suppression services.

All the counties were created in 1905 from unorganized territory, seven years after the Territory of Hawaii was created. The county of Kalawao was historically exclusively used as a leper colony, and does not have many of the elected officials the other counties have. Many services for Kalawao County are provided by Maui County. For example, the web site for the office of the Maui County Clerk says "The office is also responsible for the elections in the County of Maui and the County of Kalawao".

== County information ==
The Federal Information Processing Standard (FIPS) code, which is used by the United States government to uniquely identify counties, is provided with each entry. The FIPS code for each county links to census data for that county.

County	FIPS code	County seat	Est.	Etymology	Island(s)	Population (2025)	Area	Map
Hawaiʻi County	001	Hilo	April 13, 1905	Island of Hawaiʻi, with which the county is coterminous; said to be named for Hawaiʻiloa, a legendary Polynesian navigator.	Hawaiʻi	210,043	4,028 sq mi (10,432 km^{2})	State map highlighting Hawaiʻi County
Honolulu County	003	Honolulu	April 22, 1903	"Sheltered bay" or "place of shelter" in the Hawaiian language, Named after Honolulu, the capital and largest city of the state.	Oʻahu and the Northwestern Hawaiian Islands (except Midway Atoll)	988,703	597 sq mi (1,546 km^{2})	State map highlighting Honolulu County
Kalawao County	005		April 22, 1903	The village of Kalawao on Molokaʻi	The Kalaupapa Peninsula on Molokaʻi	82	5.2 sq mi (13 km^{2})	State map highlighting Kalawao County
Kauai County	007	Līhuʻe	April 22, 1903	Kauaʻi, the largest of the islands in the county; name possibly derived from Kauaʻi, the eldest son of Hawaiʻiloa.	Kauaʻi, Niʻihau, Lehua, and Kaʻula	73,400	622 sq mi (1,611 km^{2})	State map highlighting Kauai County
Maui County	009	Wailuku	April 22, 1903	Maui, the largest of the islands in the county; named for Māui, a demigod from native mythology.	Maui, Kahoʻolawe, Lānaʻi, Molokaʻi (except the Kalaupapa Peninsula), and Molokini	160,592	1,120 sq mi (2,901 km^{2})	State map highlighting Maui County

== Racial / Ethnic Profile of counties in Hawaii (2020 Census) ==
Racial / Ethnic Profile of counties in Hawaii (2020 Census)
Following is a table of counties in Hawaii by race/ethnicity. The majority racial/ethnic group is coded per the key below.

Majority minority with no dominant group
Majority White
Majority Black
Majority Hispanic
Majority Asian
Majority Native American

Racial and ethnic composition of counties in Hawaii (2020 Census) (NH = Non-Hispanic) Note: the US Census treats Hispanic/Latino as an ethnic category. This table excludes Latinos from the racial categories and assigns them to a separate category. Hispanics/Latinos may be of any race.
County	Location of County	Total Population	White alone (NH)	%	Black or African American alone (NH)	%	Native American or Alaska Native alone (NH)	%	Asian alone (NH)	%	Pacific Islander alone (NH)	%	Other race alone (NH)	%	Mixed race or Multiracial (NH)	%	Hispanic or Latino (any race)	%
Hawaii		200,629	64,688	32.24%	1,159	0.58%	649	0.32%	38,351	19.12%	26,185	13.05%	1,000	0.50%	46,322	23.09%	22,275	11.10%
Honolulu		1,016,508	175,530	17.27%	19,356	1.90%	1,116	0.11%	429,410	42.24%	97,063	9.55%	3,174	0.31%	198,537	19.53%	92,322	9.08%
Kalawao		82	27	32.93%	0	0.00%	0	0.00%	9	10.98%	15	18.29%	4	4.88%	9	10.98%	18	21.95%
Kauai		73,298	22,194	30.28%	352	0.48%	156	0.21%	20,504	27.97%	6,825	9.31%	283	0.39%	15,590	21.27%	7,394	10.09%
Maui		164,754	51,926	31.52%	1,010	0.61%	400	0.24%	43,284	26.27%	18,966	11.51%	822	0.50%	31,432	19.08%	16,914	10.27%
