= Kalani Oceanside Retreat =

Retreat center on Big Island, Hawaii, U.S.

Coordinates: 19.40590°N 154.91097°W

- Formation: 1975
- Founders: Richard Koob, Ernest Morgan
- Type: Non-profit
- Purpose: Retreat center
- Location(s): Puna District, Island of Hawaii
- Website: www.kalani.com
- Formerly called: Kalani Honua

Kalani Oceanside Retreat, also known as Kalani Honua or Kalani, is a non-profit retreat center located on the Big Island of Hawai'i. It was established in 1975 and utilized for holistic lifestyle, yoga, and spiritual retreats.

== Overview ==
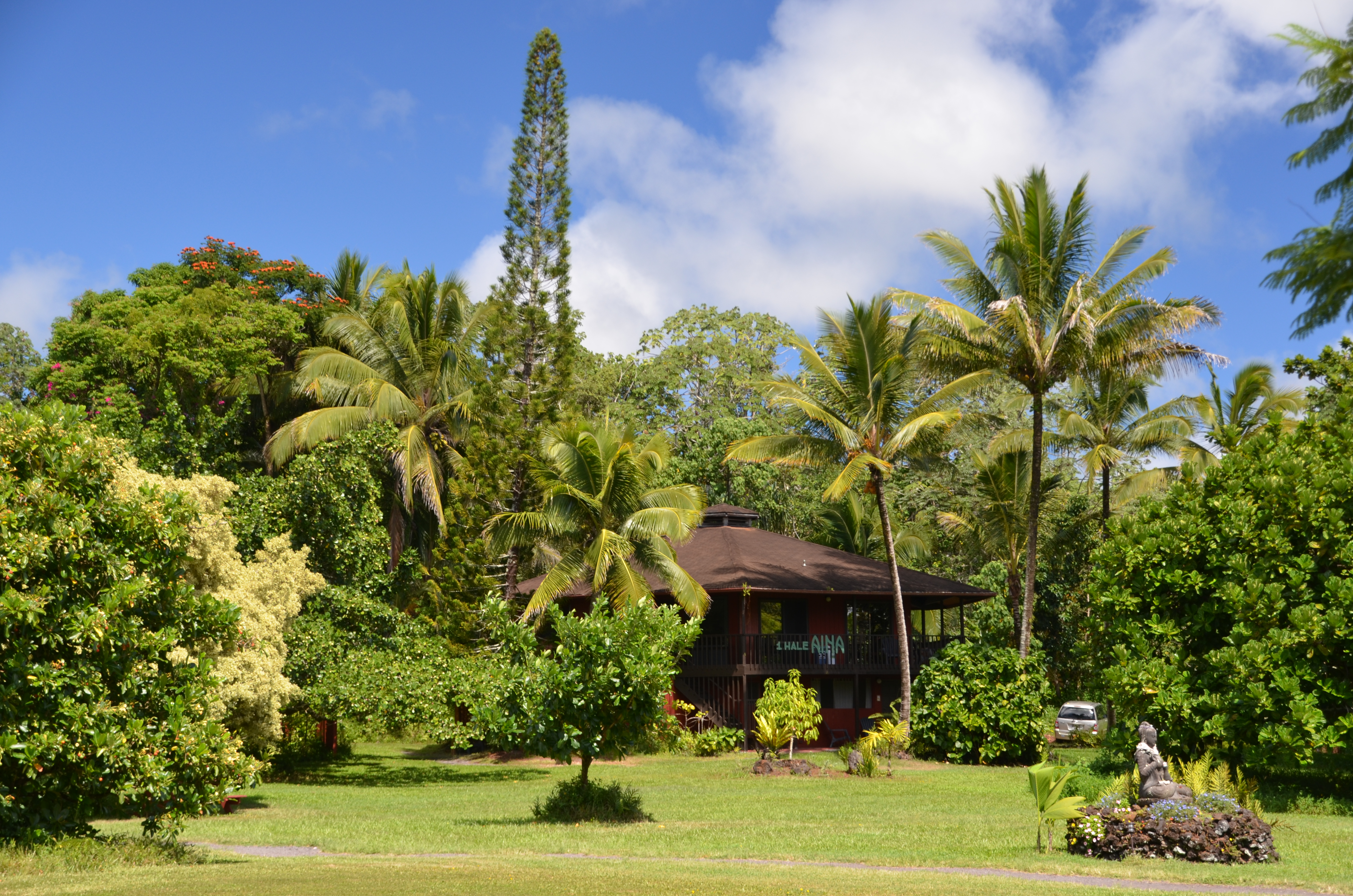
Northeastern part of the main campus with Hale ʻĀina

Kalani Oceanside Retreat is a non-profit retreat center occupying a 120-acre compound located in the Puna District of the Big Island of Hawai'i. Kalani hosts residential workshops, sponsors community arts programs, special events programs, and provides lodging and meals for guests. The retreat center oversees volunteer, sabbatical, and visiting artist educational programs. It also houses a sustainable community of residents in an eco-village.

== History ==
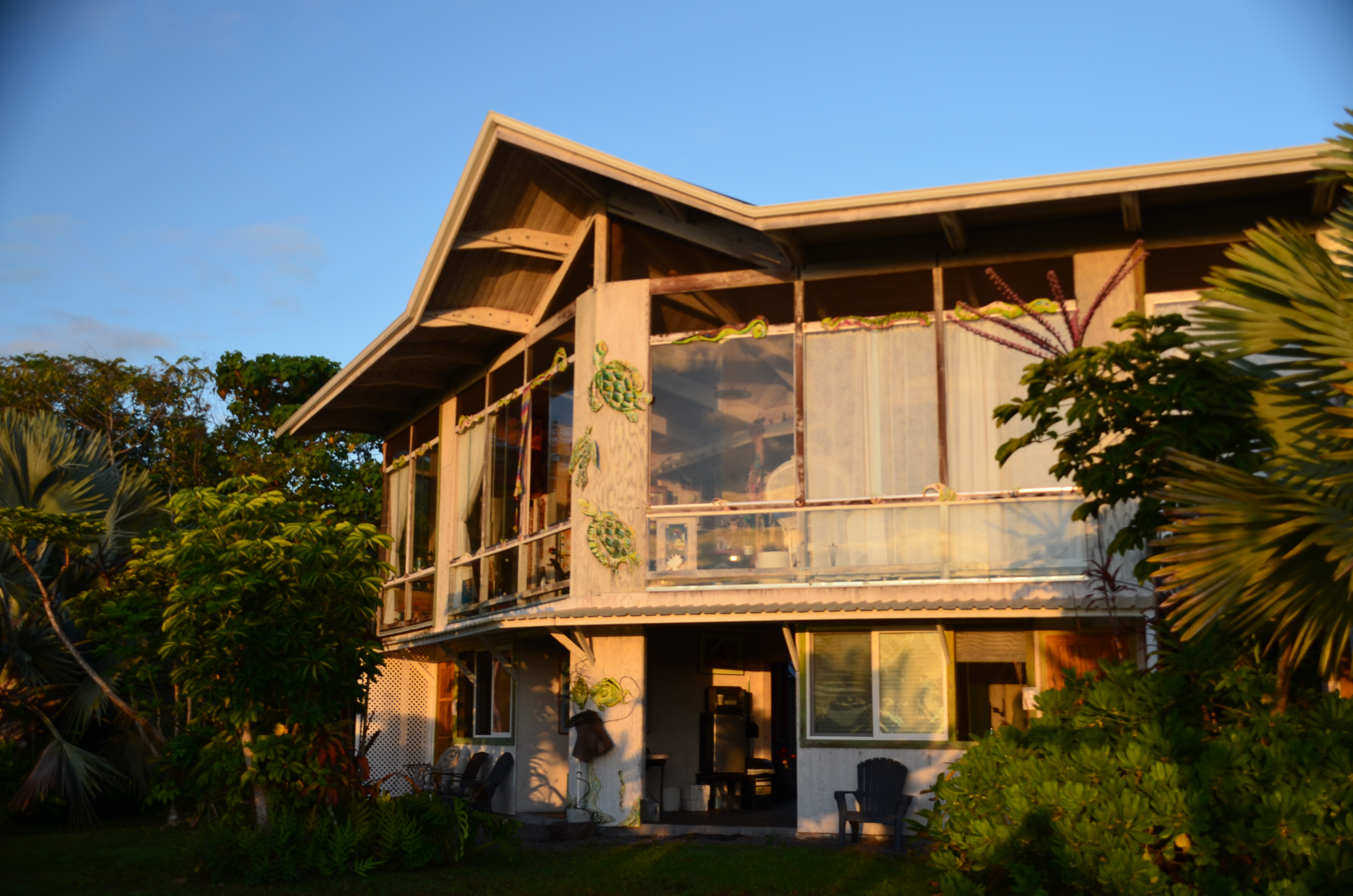
Ocean Vista (western part of Kalani Kai)

In 1975, two professional dancers, Richard Koob, and Ernest Morgan purchased the original 19-acre property, which they named Kalani Honua, which translates to "harmony of Heaven on Earth.”

Workshops and classes were conducted including Hawaiian culture, yoga, dance, painting, music, and creative writing. Workshop and course offerings increased as Kalani gained more recognition. Extensive volunteer, sabbatical, and visiting artist education programs were developed.

The Kalani campus was expanded to its current 120 acres, with the purchase of the adjacent 94-acre Kalani Kai ("Heavenly Sea") parcel, and the 6-acre Kalani Mauka ("Heavenly Uplands") parcel, land specifically dedicated to building a sustainable agricultural community.

== Programs ==
Kalani operates as a non-profit, 501(c)(3) charity through Kalani Honua, Inc., with a focus on nature, culture, and wellness.

Kalani's residential retreats offer workshops on art and human development, holistic health, Hawaiian culture, and include yoga, dance, and bodywork.

Kalani sponsors the Puna Community Arts Program, which consists of daily scheduled public offerings such as yoga, meditation, qigong, dance, alternative healing and a weekly ecstatic dance program. Special events consist of lectures, performances, symposia, festivals, dances, and other activities open to the general public, including the Puna Music Festival, Puna Culinary Festival, Illuminato, and the Hawai'i Yoga Festival.

Kalani oversees a residential volunteer education program, with more than 100 volunteers on-site at a time. Volunteers are expected to contribute to the community through work in the kitchen, housekeeping, grounds, maintenance, or administrative office, and are encouraged to participate in daily life in the community, as well as workshops, classes, and Arts Program activities. Sabbatical and Visiting Artist programs are also offered.

The Hawai'i Massage School at Kalani offers full-time and part-time bodywork training, as well as an apprenticeship program approved by the Hawai'i State Massage Board to satisfy course requirements and prepare for the state certification examination.

As of 2013, Kalani's annual economic impact was estimated at nearly $10 million. The majority of Kalani's expenditures stay in the state, and contribute to the local economy of the Puna District, the poorest district in Hawai'i. All proceeds from guest stays go into Kalani’s community programming and services. According to Kalani founder Richard Koob, "[Kalani buys] as much produce as we can from local farmers, with many farmers growing specifically to supply Kalani’s needs."

== Structure and management ==
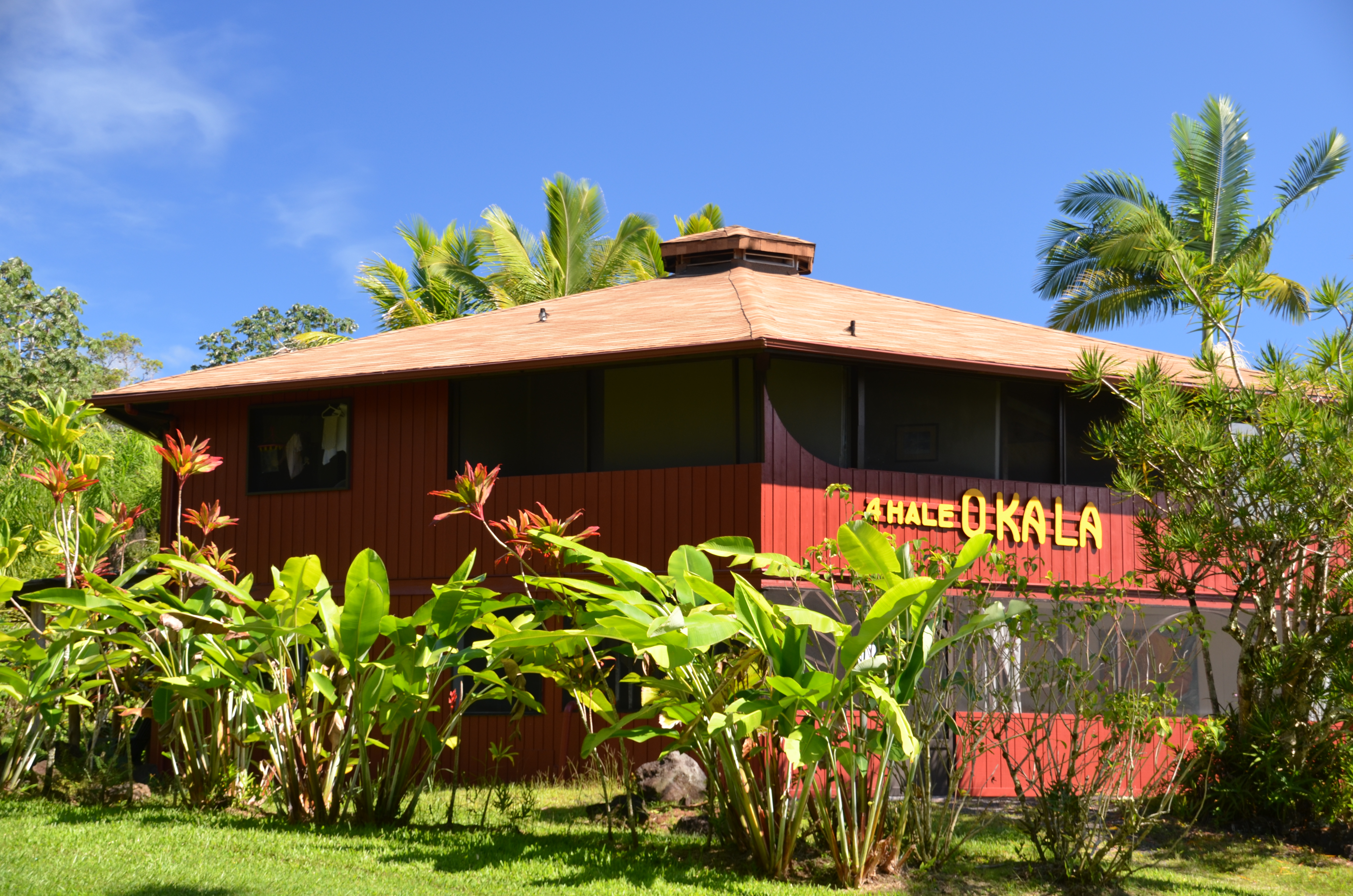
Hale (guest accommodation)

Kalani's facilities include guest lodging, a large community dining area (dining lānai), numerous buildings and rooms dedicated to workshops and classes, resident housing and camping areas, and a clothing optional pool and spa area. Grounds include gardens, open space, recreational areas, permaculture plantings, and natural areas.

Kalani's Wellness Department offers land and aquatic bodywork, including traditional Hawaiian lomilomi, Thai massages, and Watsu.

Meals are served buffet-style in a roofed patio known in Hawai‘i as a "lānai". The dining lānai is considered to play a central role in the community, described as a gathering place where one "can experience the daily rhythms of assembly and departure reminiscent of ancient village life." A guide to Kalani's cuisine describes the food as "a Pacific fusion of local, Thai, Indian, Italian, and many other cuisines".

For 38 years, Richard Koob served as the Director of Kalani. In 2012, Lester John ("LJ") Bates III was appointed as Kalani’s Executive Director. LJ quickly gained a reputation as a controlling tyrant who only saw value in his own opinions. He effectively fired half of the managers living in the community within the first 6 months of his tenure, with only 24 hours notice to leave, many of whom had lived and worked in the community for over a decade. LJ was eventually fired for illegally placing almost all new board members, gaining majority voting power, that he personally selected, which was against the non-profit organizations by-laws. Richard Koob retired in July 2013, continuing as a Kalani Board Member and Director Emeritus. In April 2016, a new Executive Director, Joel Tan, was appointed.

The facility operates with a small paid staff and a large volunteer workforce. Institutional structure comprises a sustainable living educational focus in all departments: Programs, Cultural Heritage, Culinary/Kitchen, Ho'okipa/Housekeeping, Maintenance, New Construction, Permaculture/Horticulture, Information Management, Student/Faculty Services, Wellness/Massage, and Administration.

There is an "eco-village" of resident "stewards" who live onsite and contribute to the community in a variety of ways. Resident housing is primarily in clusters of eco-cottages, with an emphasis on sustainable living.

== Environment ==
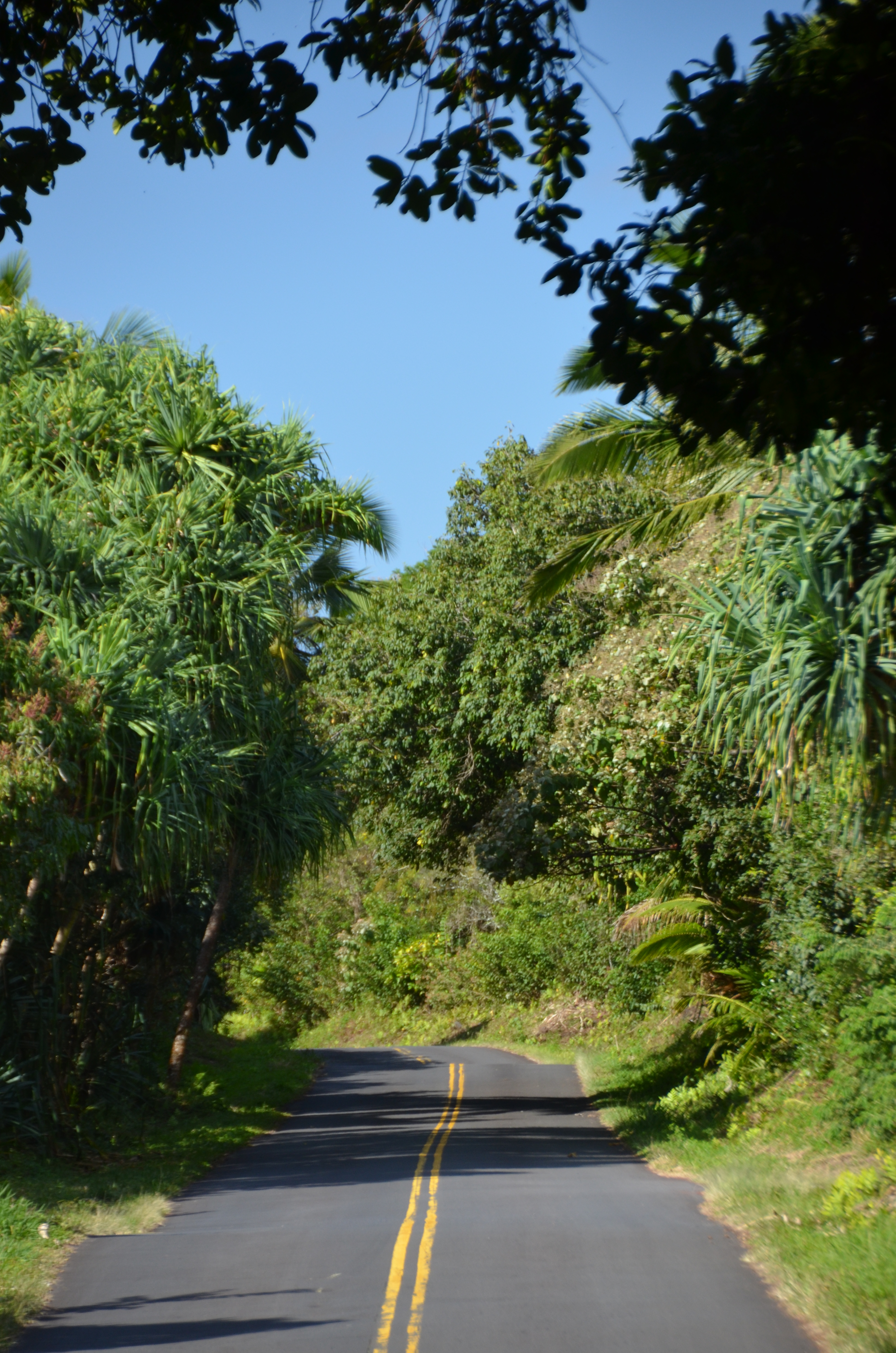
The Red Road in front of the entrance to Kalani, with hala trees

The retreat is located on the Red Road (Highway 137 or Kalapana-Kapoho Road), named because it used to be paved with red cinder from the Kapoho eruption of 1960. The road winds along cliffs overlooking the ocean, through tropical rainforest, recent lava flows, and tunnel-like canopies of kamani (Calophyllum inophyllum), milo (Thespesia populnea), and hala (Pandanus tectorius) trees.

Nearby natural areas include Isaac Hale Beach Park, a protected section of coastline popular for swimming, surfing, and boating. MacKenzie State Recreation Area is a secluded park featuring groves of ironwood trees and lava tubes that open to the ocean. Aʻakepa offers an expanse of lava flats and tide pools with tidal channels and small lagoons. Lastly, there's Kehena Beach, a natural black sand beach.

The Kapoho Tide Pools (officially named the Wai Opae Tide Pools Marine Life Conservation District), a protected coral reef ecosystem, and Ahalanui Beach Park, a volcanically heated hot pond, were destroyed during the 2018 lower Puna eruption.

== Heritage sites ==
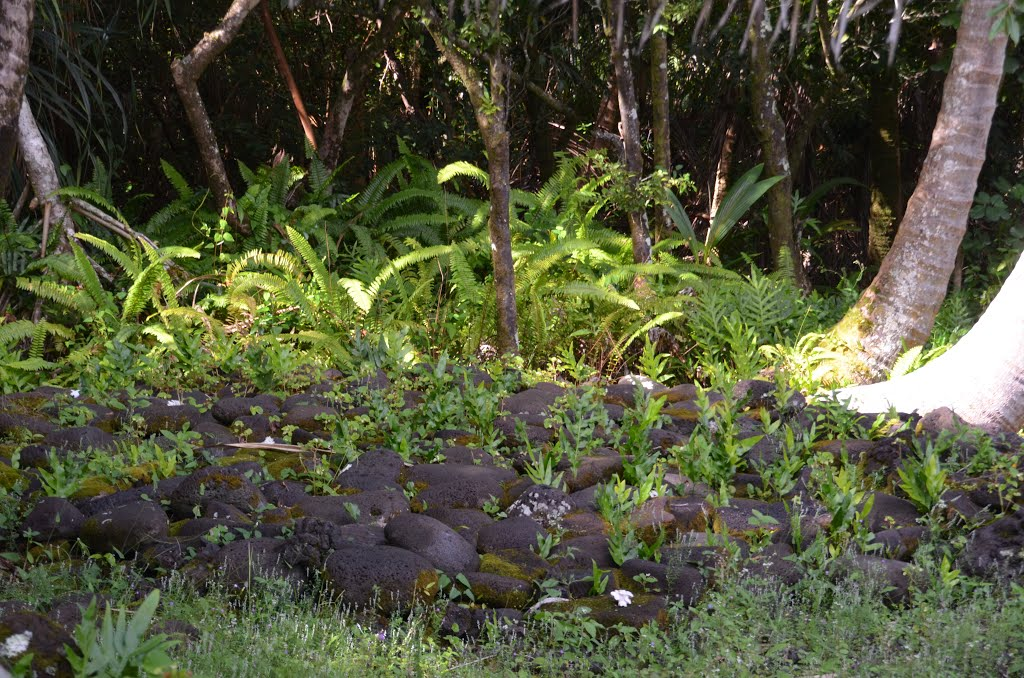
Heiau Stone Temple site

Three heritage sites at Kalani are registered with the Hawai’i State Department of Land and Natural Resources:

- Heiau Stone Temple site, re-consecrated by native kahuna spiritual leaders; dedicated to Lono and Kanaloa, gods of agricultural and ocean abundance, peace, parties, and prosperity;
- Halau School site, operated until 1900, transitioned from traditional native cultural practices to the inclusion of western missionary influence;
- Ala Kai coastal trail sections, which once served as part of the major land route connecting more than 600 communities of the island kingdom of Hawai‘i between the 15th and 18th centuries.

== Awards ==
Kalani has received awards on TripAdvisor:

- Certificate of Excellence, 2012, 2013, 2014, TripAdvisor
- Greenleaders Platinum, 2013, 2014, TripAdvisor

Members of Kalani's community have received awards for various contributions and activities:

- Best Overall, First Annual PRIDE parade, July 6, 2013, Hawaii Island Pride
- Best Use Of Organic Ingredients, Josef Schneider: Raw Vegan Egg Salad, 2013, Pupu Palooza Award at the Puna Culinary Festival
- Commendation for Strong Commitment to Nurturing and Education, 2013. Hawai'i State Legislature Commendation to Kalani Founder Richard Koob for "pursuit of excellence" and "lasting legacy", State of Hawai'i 27th Senate

== 2018 lava-eruption closure and 2019 relaunch ==
In May 2018, due to the 2018 lower Puna eruption, Kalani shutdown its operations, stating "Kalani is currently closed. They are not accepting registrations or volunteer applications at this time. Recent earthquake activity on Kilauea’s south flank and lava eruptions in the Leilani Estates Subdivision are affecting air quality." Follow-up announcements in June 2018 stated that all operations had been indefinitely suspended.

In early 2019, Kalani was offered for sale.

On July 19, 2019, the organization announced a "rebirth" of Kalani, with a new board of directors. The announcement stated, "Kalani intends to relaunch with a new vision, supported by community crowd funding, to begin generating revenue, making necessary improvements and, ultimately, supporting healing and restoration to lower Puna." As of July 23, 2019, Kalani has re-launched, with a new board of directors, and local employment in lieu of volunteer staff, and is gradually restoring its operations.

== See also ==
- Arthur Johnsen — Artist-in-residence 1989–1998
- Omega Institute for Holistic Studies
