= Painted Church =

Painted Church may refer to several Hawaiian churches that were decorated with religious scenes:

- St. Benedict's Catholic Church, commonly called simply "The Painted Church"
- Star of the Sea Painted Church
