= Koob =

Koob is a surname. Notable people with the surname include:

- Ernie Koob (1892–1941), American baseball player
- George Koob (born 1947), American academic
- Markus Koob (born 1977), German politician
- Richard Koob (born 1946), American artist

== See also ==
- Kubb
