= Arthur Johnsen =

American painter

- Born: August 27, 1952; Oahu, Hawaii
- Died: November 15, 2015 (aged 63); Hilo, Hawaii
- Education: University of California, Berkeley
- Known for: Hawaiiana; Hawaiian landscapes Paintings of the Red Road
- Notable work: The Goddess Pele
- Style: Impressionism
- Website: Remembering Arthur Johnsen

Arthur Johnsen (August 27, 1952 – November 15, 2015) was an American artist. Born and raised on Oahu and living most of his post-university life on the Big Island of Hawaii, he is known for his impressionistic paintings and murals of Hawaiiana.

He is best known internationally for his 2003 painting of the volcano goddess Pele, which was chosen from more than 140 entries to represent the goddess at the Hawaiʻi Volcanoes National Park, and is on display at the main visitor center there. He is also known for his Hawaiian landscape paintings, including those of the rural tree-lined coastal Red Road in Lower Puna.

== Life and career ==
Johnsen was born in Hawaii on the island of Oahu, and attended Punahou High School, graduating in 1970. He studied graphic design at the University of California, Berkeley, graduating in 1974. He returned to Oahu for work and further study, lived for a while in Volcano Village on the Big Island beginning in the late 1970s, and later spent five years in Los Angeles doing freelance design work in the garment and costume industry.

He moved to Puna on the Big Island of Hawaii in 1989. He was artist-in-residence at Kalani Oceanside Retreat from 1989 to 1998, and also did fabric design for Kona Village Resort. In 1992 he moved to his own house in the Lower Puna area.

His paintings were sold at the Ohana o Hawaii gallery in Hilo, and when owner Randy Farias retired in 2005, it was renamed the Arthur Johnsen Gallery under the ownership of Johnsen and a business partner. In 2012, Johnsen closed the gallery and moved his paintings to the newly formed One Gallery in Hilo.

Johnsen also created murals commissioned by a number of resorts, restaurants, public buildings, and cruise ships throughout the Hawaiian islands.

His works were exhibited at venues including the Volcano Art Center, Honolulu Hale, and the East Hawaii Cultural Center. In 2013 he was exhibited at the Andrew Rose Gallery in Honolulu, among eleven artists collectively considered the "leading landscape painters from the Islands".

A retrospective of his work, in particular his plein air impressionistic paintings of vistas of the Red Road in Lower Puna, was presented by the East Hawaii Cultural Center at the Hawaii Museum of Contemporary Art from January 3–29, 2014. The museum and cultural center published a book of the exhibited works, entitled Paintings of the Red Road by Arthur Johnsen.

Some of Johnsen's paintings have been held by Cedar Street Gallery in Honolulu. As of 2019, some of his paintings were still held at Third Dimension Gallery in Kohala Coast.

== The Goddess Pele ==
In early 2003, the group of Native Hawaiian elders, or kupuna, advising the superintendent of Hawaiʻi Volcanoes National Park on cultural matters were concerned that the painting of the volcano goddess Pele in the main visitor center did not portray the goddess in a culturally appropriate manner. The portrayal which had been on display at the center since 1966, a 1927 painting by D. Howard Hitchcock, pictured Pele as a blonde Caucasian woman. The Kupuna Committee and the park staff worked with the Sacred Mountains Program of The Mountain Institute, which had funds from the Ford Foundation, to put out a state-wide call in March 2003 for paintings of Pele which the elders would select from in August of that year. An $8,000 prize for the winning entry was offered. More than 140 paintings were submitted for the competition.

Johnsen's entry, titled The Goddess Pele, was selected in the blind competition as the winner, as best representing Pele's "deepest cultural meanings". It depicts Pele with a serene, compassionate expression and two objects in her hands representing important stories connected with her, against a background of volcanic activity. Johnsen used a Native Hawaiian as his model, and lit her face from below; living near Kalapana and having watched many lava flows at night, he knew that lava throws light from below up toward faces.

The portrayal depicts Pele striding through the lava flow in the forest with her digging staff Pāʻoa, which she used for excavating while searching for a home that she finally found at Halemaʻumaʻu, in her left hand. Her right hand holds an egg containing her unborn sister goddess Hiʻiaka, which she carried on her journey from Tahiti.

The painting represents a more native view of Pele, who is regarded by Native Hawaiians not as a wrathful deity but as a benevolent, life-giving goddess who creates new land with her lava. In interviews, Johnsen stated, "I show her with a staff in one hand to represent her as a destroyer, and cradling an egg in the other, representing regeneration and the fact that new life springs up from lava." "It's not all about destruction. The egg is a symbol of regeneration and new life. Lava creates new land as well as it destroys old places."

He noted that he had been living in Puna, close to the active lava flows, since 1989, and had seen the destruction of Kalapana and the beach at Kaimu, and had watched lava flows from his home. He added that his proximity to the steady active lava flows made him "feel closely connected [to Pele] on a very personal level".

In 2005, Hawaiʻi Volcanoes National Park finished refurbishing its Visitor Center, and replaced the Hitchcock painting with Johnsen's The Goddess Pele. It is on permanent display beside the center's fireplace.

== Personal life ==
Johnsen lived along the Red Road near Kehena in Lower Puna on the Big Island of Hawaii, in the home he built in 1992. He died in November 2015 following a sudden illness.
