= Hawaii Route 137 =

State highway in Hawaii, United States

Hawaii Route 137
- Kapoho-Kalapana Road
- Route 137 highlighted in red

Route information
- Maintained by HDOT
- Length: 9.6 mi (15.4 km)

Major junctions
- West end: Pahoa Kalapana Road
- East end: Route 132 near Kapoho

Location
- Country: United States
- State: Hawaii

Highway system
- Routes in Hawaii
← Route 132	→ Route 139

Route 137 is a state highway in Hawaii County, Hawaii. The highway, known as the Kapoho-Kalapana Road, the Beach Road, or the Red Road, travels along the eastern coast of the island of Hawaii between Kalapana and Kapoho. It passes near Kīlauea and its lava fields, as well as Isaac Hale Beach Park and other protected areas.

== Route description ==
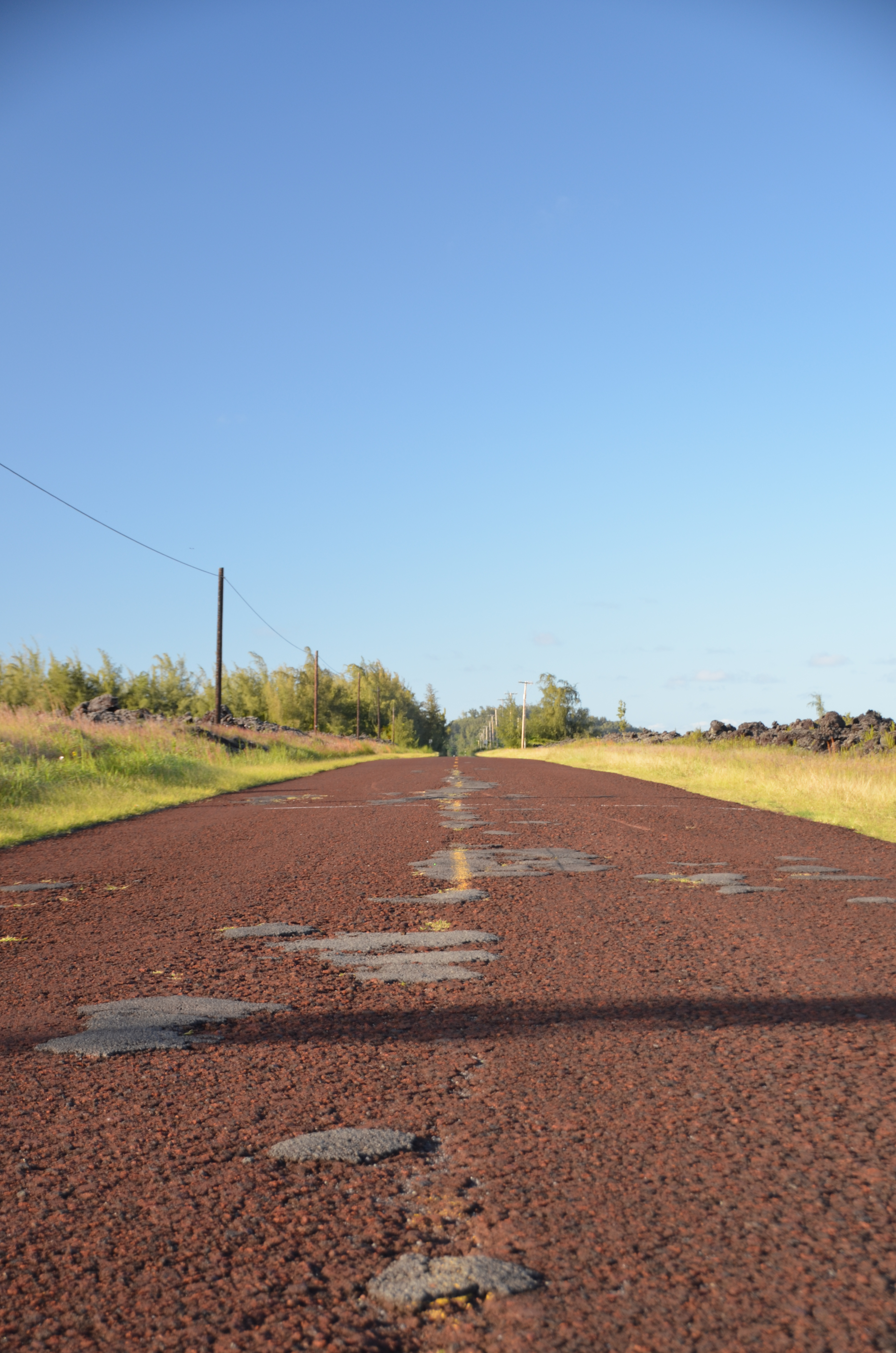
A section of the Red Road with pavement still containing Hawaiian volcanic red cinder, never having been repaved with black asphalt (2012)

Route 137 travels along the Pacific Ocean, near the flat flanks of Kīlauea, and through lava fields, as well as by Isaac Hale Beach Park and other protected areas. Locally it is known as the Red Road due to its long having been paved with Hawaiian volcanic red cinder; most of it was paved with black asphalt in 2000 but it is still called the Red Road. It is a designated scenic byway with ocean vistas.

== History ==
Several lava flows from Kīlauea have crossed sections of the highway en route to the Pacific Ocean. The 1990 lava flow that destroyed Kalapana moved along Highway 137. During the 2018 lower Puna eruption of Kīlauea's East rift zone, a lava flow from Fissure 20 buried a section of Route 137 between Kamaili Road and Pohoiki Road and flows from Fissure 8 flowed east across and along Hawaii Route 132, cutting more of Route 137 in the vicinity of Kapoho.

== Major intersections ==
The entire route is in Hawaii County.

Location	mi	km	Destinations	Notes
	0.0	0.0	Pahoa Kalapana Road	Western terminus
	9.6	15.4	Route 132	Eastern terminus
1.000 mi = 1.609 km; 1.000 km = 0.621 mi

== Appearances in art ==
Artist Arthur Johnsen (1952–2015), a resident of Lower Puna, depicted vistas of the Red Road in numerous plein-air impressionistic oil paintings. Many of these paintings were anthologized by the East Hawaii Cultural Center and the Hawaii Museum of Contemporary Art, in a 2014 book titled Paintings of the Red Road by Arthur Johnsen.
