= St. Benedict's Catholic Church (Hōnaunau, Hawaii) =

Historic Place in Hawaii County, Hawaii

- U.S. National Register of Historic Places
- Hawaiʻi Register of Historic Places
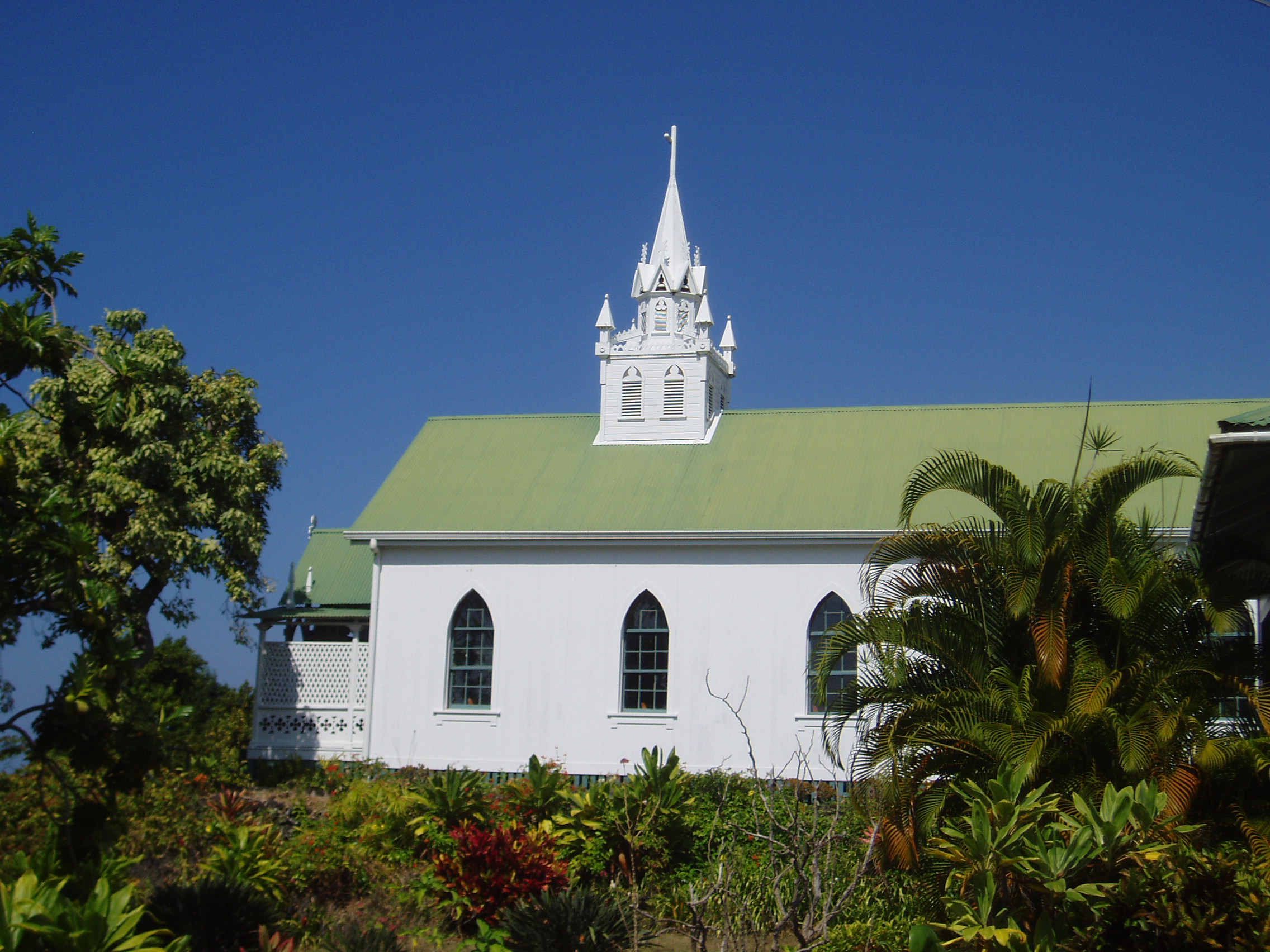
- Saint Benedict's Catholic Church

- Location within Hawaii
- Location: Honaunau, Hawaii
- Coordinates: 19°26′6.252″N 155°53′17.952″W
- Built: 1899
- Architect: Velghe, Fr. John Berchmans
- Architectural style: Gothic
- NRHP reference No.: 79000753
- HRHP No.: 10 47 7230

Significant dates
- Added to NRHP: May 31, 1979
- Designated HRHP: March 27, 1979

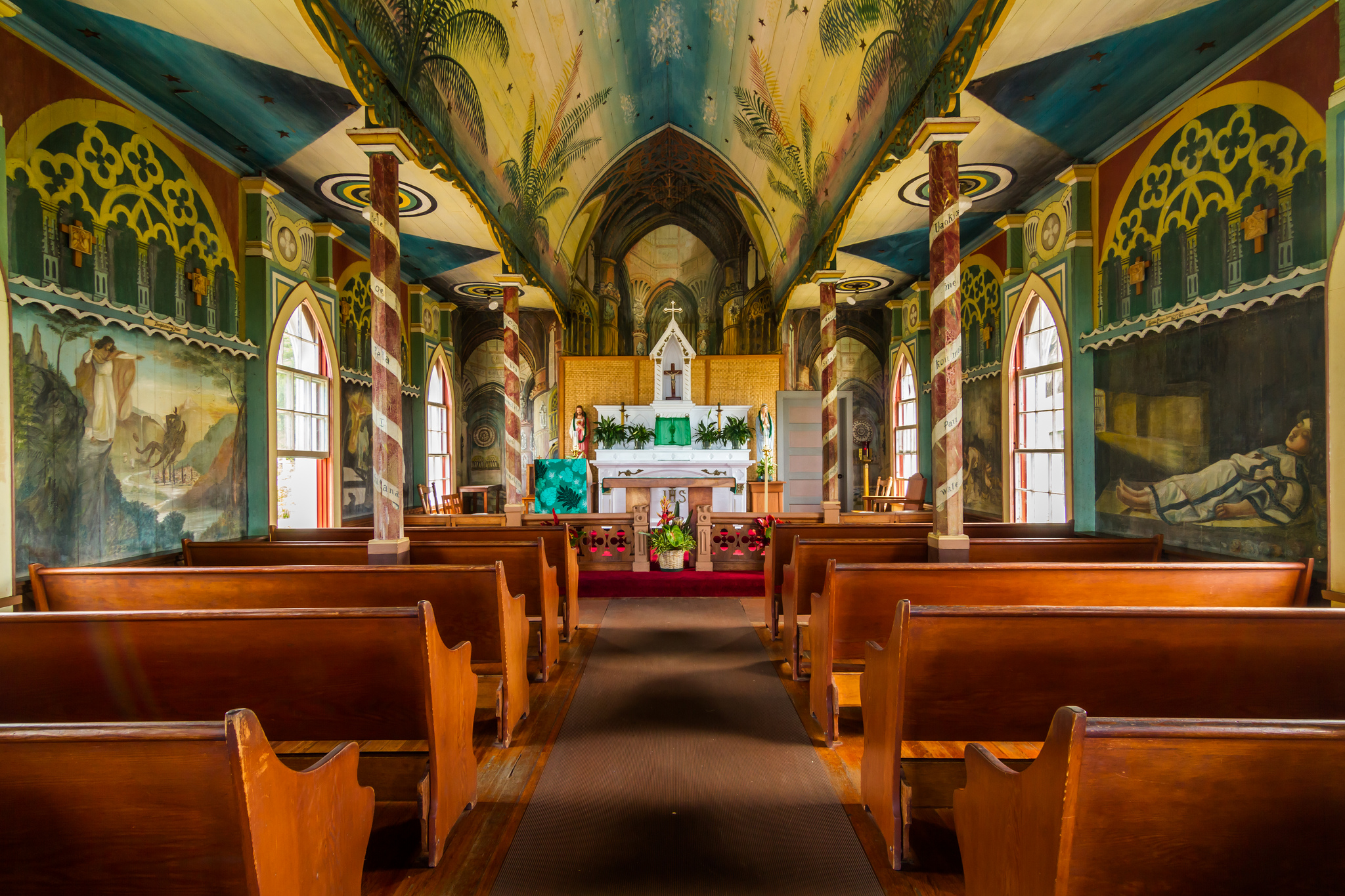
Interior of the church, showing frescoes

Saint Benedict's Catholic Church (also called simply The Painted Church) is a parish of the Roman Catholic Church in Hōnaunau, Hawaii. It was built between 1899 and 1902 under the direction of the Belgian Catholic missionary Father John Velghe, who then painted frescoes along the interior ceiling and walls. An untrained folk-artist, Fr. Velghe depicted various biblical scenes, such as Cain's murder of Abel, Jesus refusing the Devil, and the writing on the wall, as well as a vivid illustration of sinners in Hell. While the building itself is small and rectangular, Fr. Velghe painted Gothic vaults above the altar, creating the illusion of a European Gothic cathedral, inspired particularly by Burgos Cathedral. Several other priests learned from Velghe and went on to establish other 'painted churches', including Star of the Sea Painted Church, painted by Father Evarist Gielen.

St. Benedict's continues to be an active Roman Catholic church in the Diocese of Honolulu, vicariate of West Hawaii, holding five masses per week. It is listed on the National Register of Historic Places, and is open to the public for viewing seven days a week.

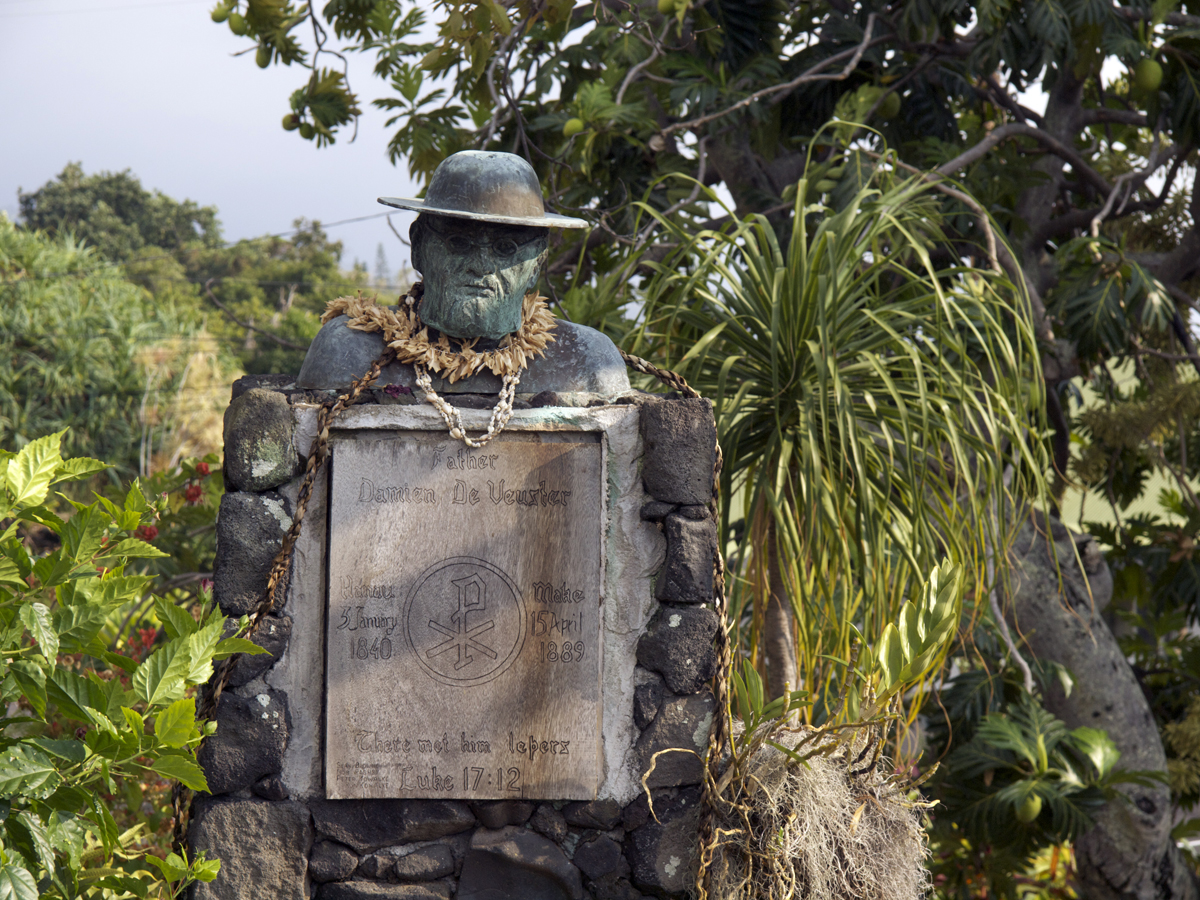
Monument at St. Benedict's Catholic Church in Honaunau (Hawaii)

A monument for Father Damien stands in front of the church and is often decorated with Leis.

== Frescoes ==
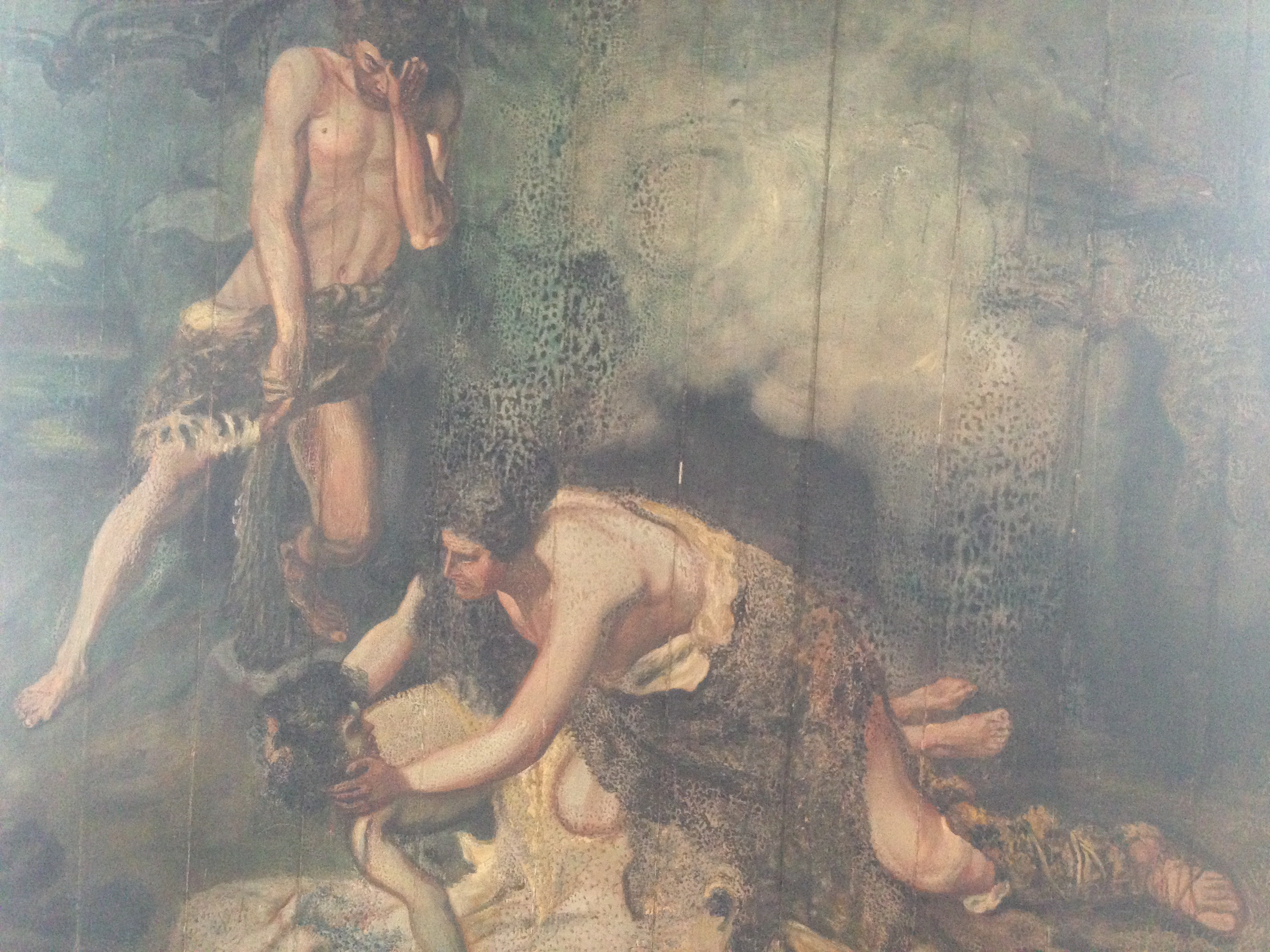
Eve, Cain and Abel

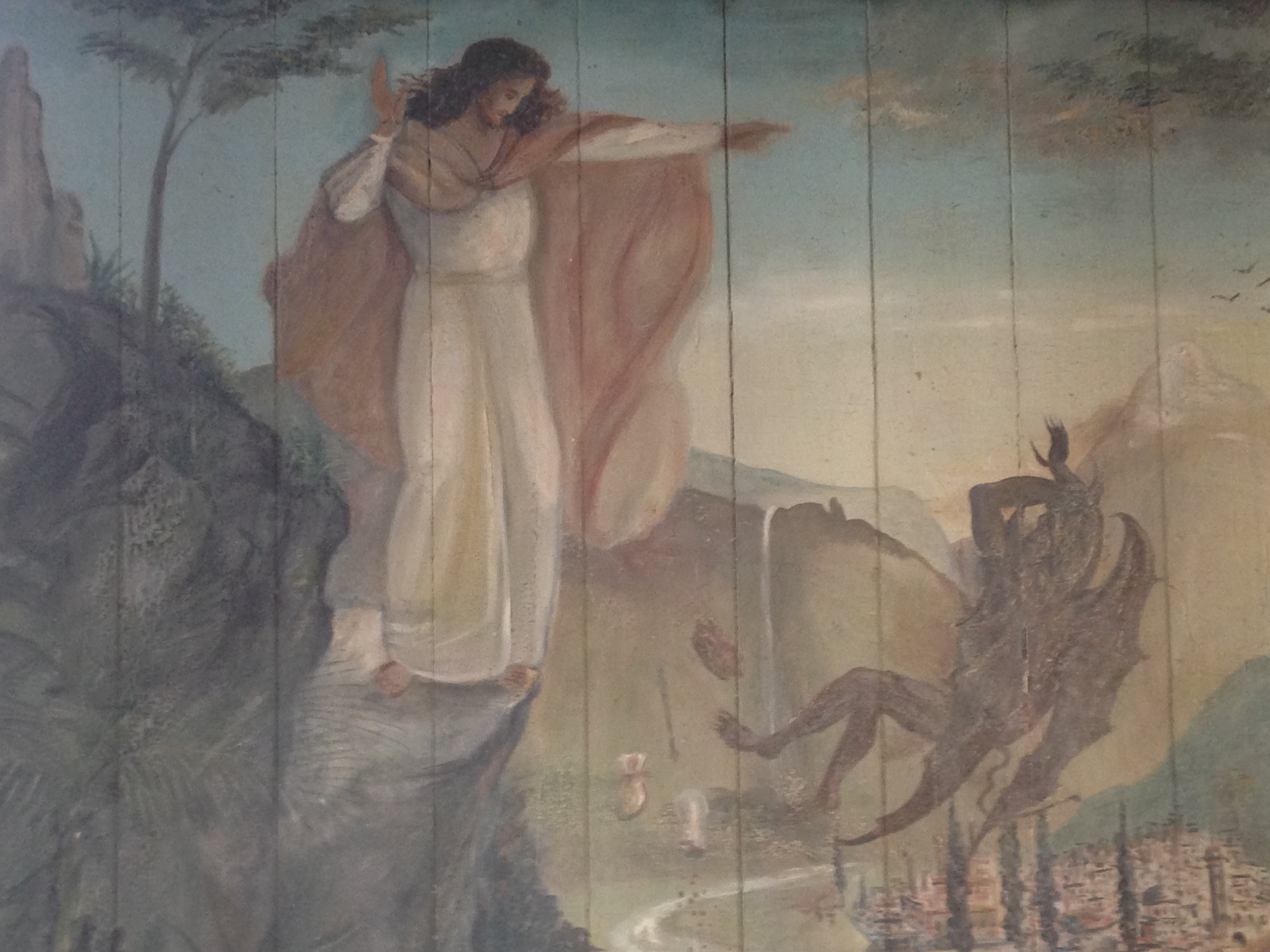
Temptation of Christ

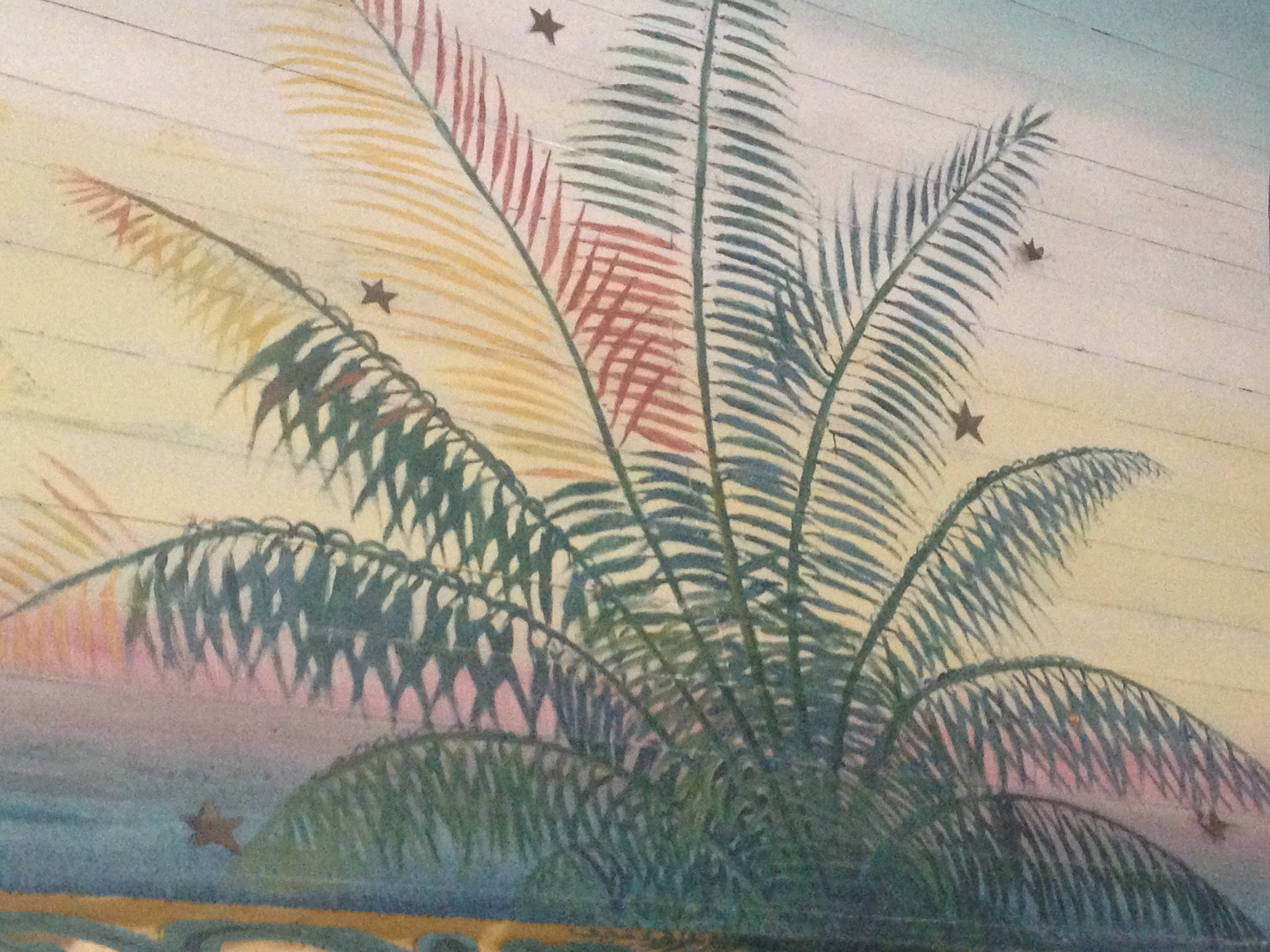
Detail of Palm Tree
