= Star of the Sea Painted Church =

Historic Place in Hawaii County, Hawaii

- Star of the Sea Church--Kalapana Painted Church
- U.S. National Register of Historic Places
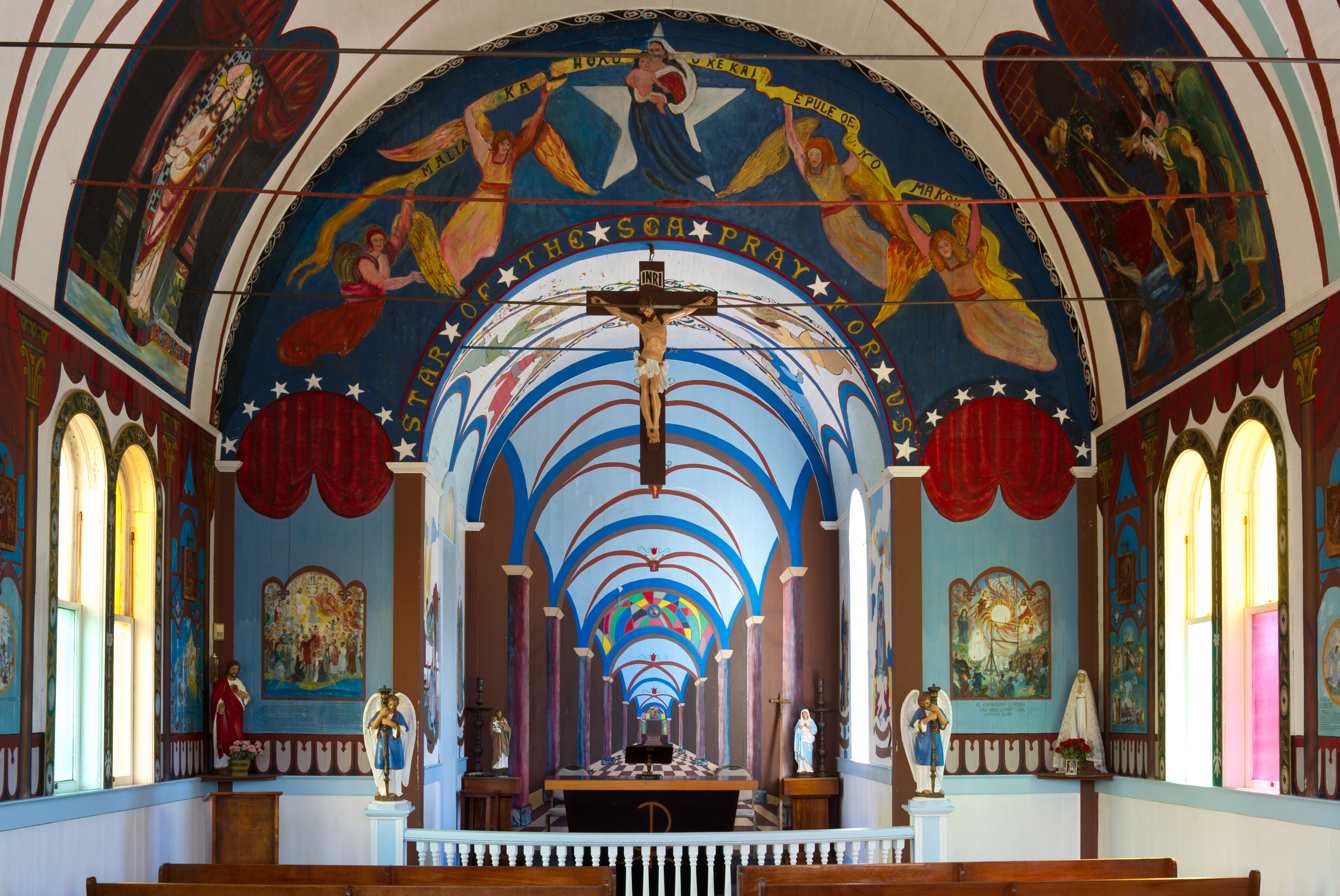
- Star of the Sea Painted Church, Kalapana, Hawai'i, built 1927-1928

- Location within Hawaii
- Location: Kaimu, Hawaii
- Coordinates: 19°22′22.476″N 154°57′49.752″W
- Built: 1931
- Architects: Gielen, Evarist, Father
- Architectural style: Colonial Revival
- NRHP reference No.: 97000407
- Added to NRHP: May 14, 1997

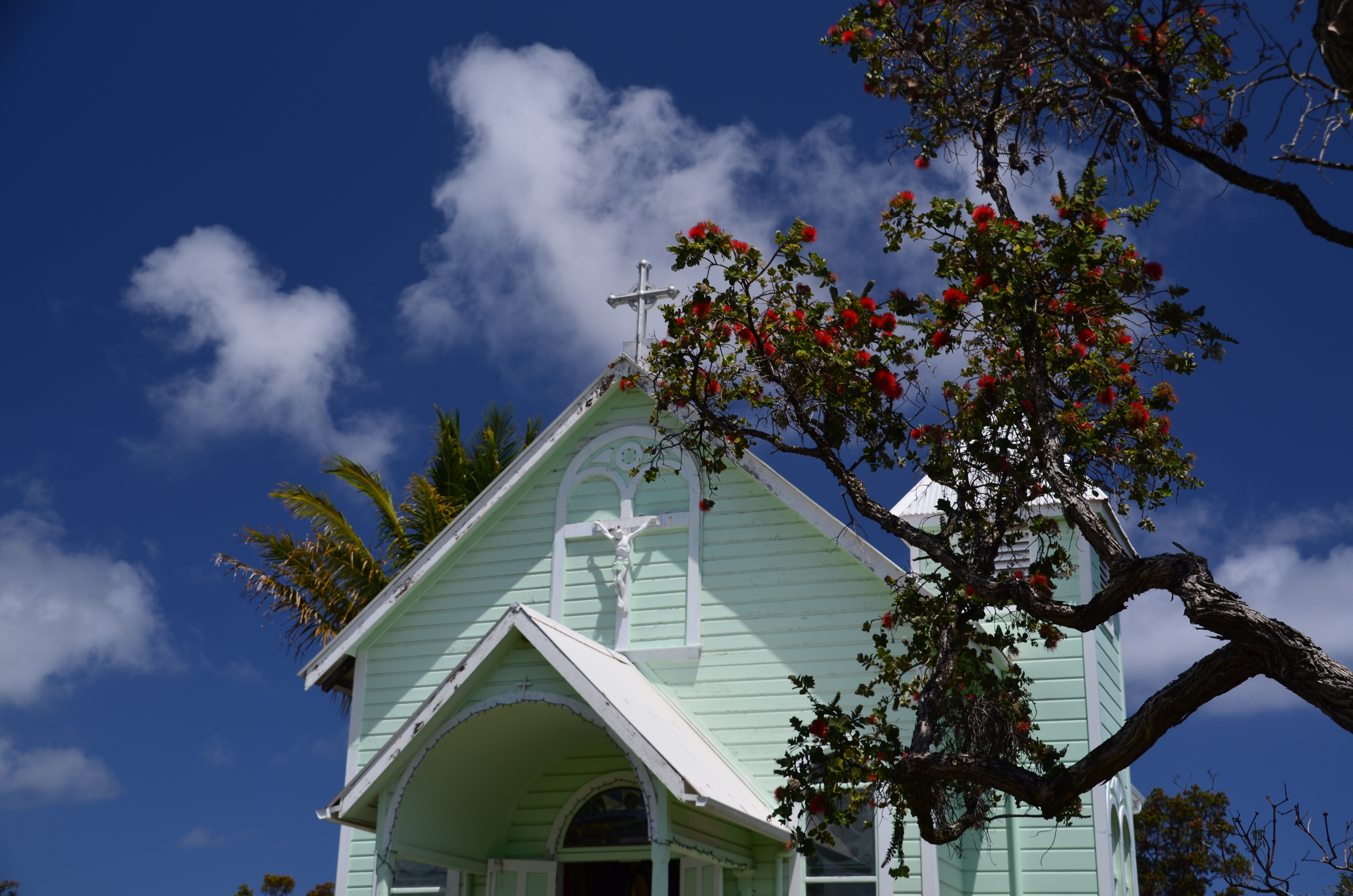
Star of the Sea Painted Church with blooming ʻŌhiʻa

The Star of the Sea Painted Church is a Catholic Church in Kalapana, Hawai'i, United States of America. It was built in 1927-1928 under the direction of a Belgian Catholic missionary, Father Evarist Gielen.

== History ==
Father Evarist Gielen was the serving priest in the district of Puna, Hawaii between 1927 and 1941, constructing a number of churches during his time on the island. He constructed the church at Kalapana shortly after his arrival in 1927, with it being completed in 1928. The church is approximately 22 by 36 feet (6.7 m × 11.0 m), constructed from wood with a corrugated metal roof. Father Evarist painted the interior of the church himself, using housepaints and linseed to cover the walls with images of Bible stories, and Hawaiian and Catholic history. Additionally, the church has two stained glass windows, created by Kenneth Burkhardt a local artisan in the 1980s, depicting Hawaii's saints, Father Damian and Marianne Cope, who both helped to cure leprosy on Molokai. Additional paintings were added in the 1960s by George Heidler and in the 1970s George Lorch.

In 1990, the church was moved to its present location just ahead of an advancing lava flow. Congregants strapped the building to a trailer in order to move the building. It is now located on Highway 130 between mile marker 19 and 20. It is on the National Register of Historic Places for its historical relationship with Father Damien, or Joseph Damien de Veuster.

The Catholic Church has essentially decommissioned the building, and Mass is now only celebrated once a month, by priests visiting the island.
