= Isaac Hale Beach Park =

Park in Hawaii, United States

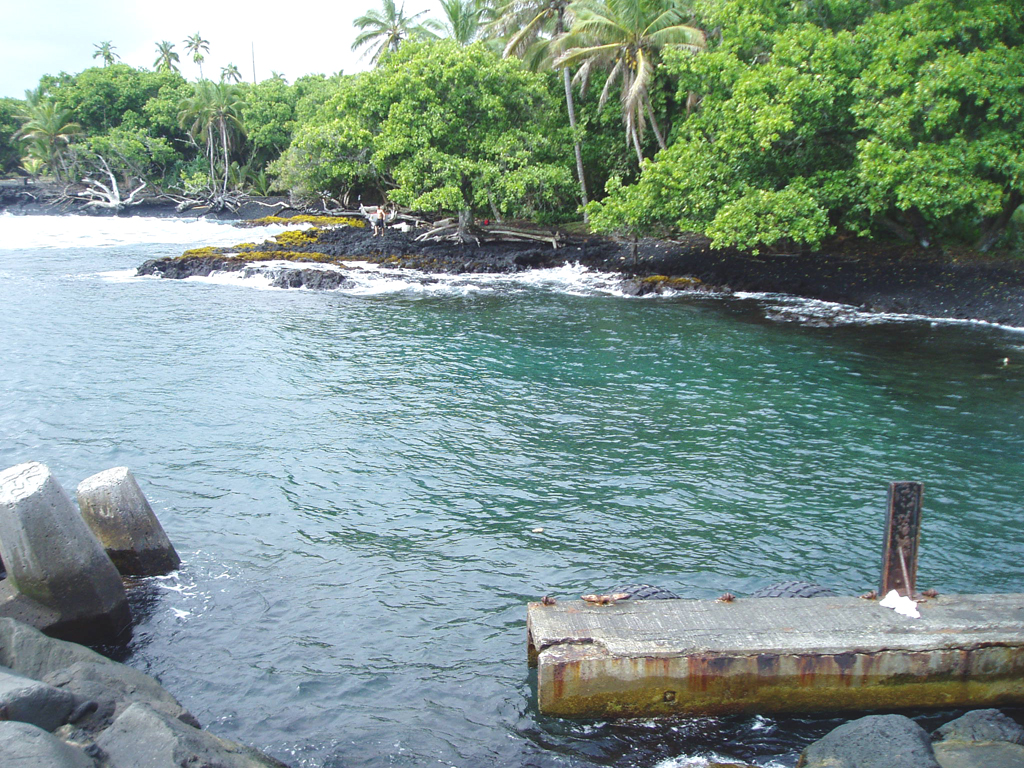
- Ocean access area in 2009, before eruption

- Location within Hawaii
- Coordinates: 19°27′27″N 154°50′28″W.

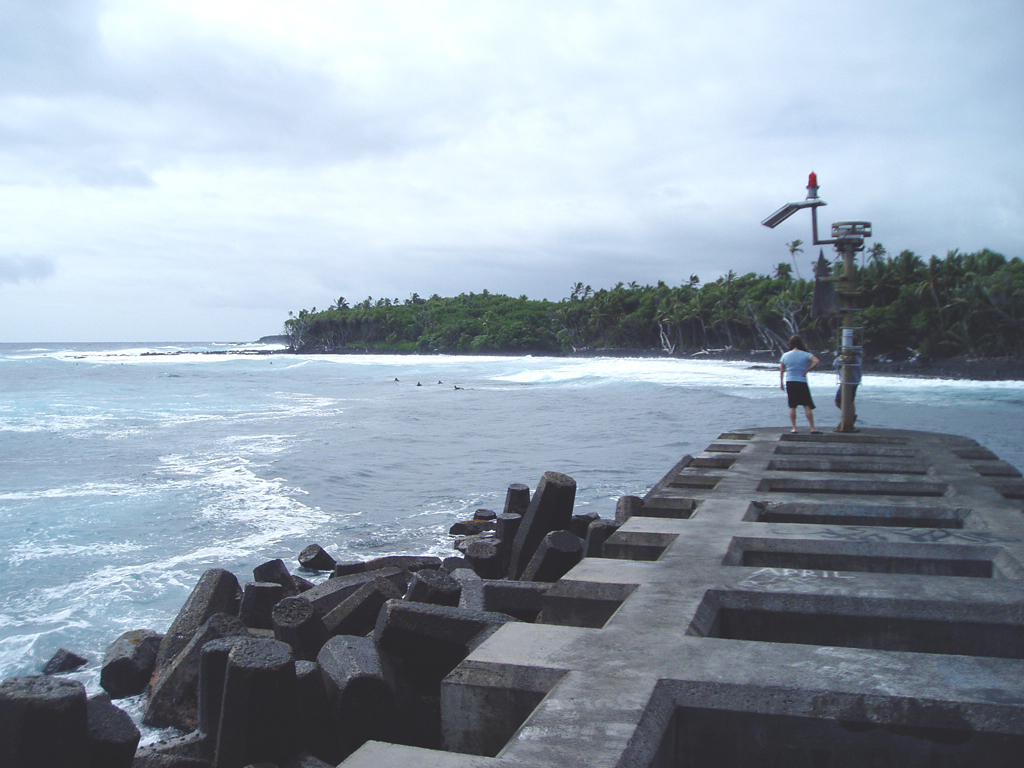
Isaac Hale Beach Park from pier, before eruption

Isaac Hale Beach Park is an oceanfront park on Pohoiki Bay in the Puna District of the Big Island of Hawaiʻi, Hawaiʻi, United States. Known for its strong currents and large waves, the bay was part of a fishing village for centuries. It was one of a few places on the southeastern shore of Hawaiʻi for ocean access and boat launching. The park used to be known for good snorkeling, though the 2018 lower Puna eruption covered most of the coral and safer swimming area with black sand. The park was expanded and modernized in 2006.

It is located at the intersection of Pohoiki Road and Kalapana-Kapoho Road (Route 137).

The park is named in honor of Private Isaac Kepo‘okalani Hale. During the Korean War, Hale served in the United States Army's 19th Infantry Regiment, 24th Infantry Division. He was killed in action north of the 38th parallel on July 12, 1951. Hale is a Hawaiian surname, pronounced HAH-leh.

== 2018 lower Puna eruption ==
Lava flows from the 2018 lower Puna eruption covered part of the park's shoreline. The lava never completely covered the park, and when the eruption wound down in early August, the front of the lava was still a few hundred feet away from the boatramp. Lava managed to cover a few picnic benches and a small playground in the northern area of the beach park. The pier, boat launch and old protected bay is now mostly buried under a new black sand beach that extends along Pohoiki Bay and impounds geothermal warm water pools accessible from the park. Since the eruption, discussions abound regarding restoring boat access to fishing and tourism operations that used the ramp prior.

== See also ==
- List of beaches in Hawaii (island)
