= Richard Koob =

American artist (born 1946)

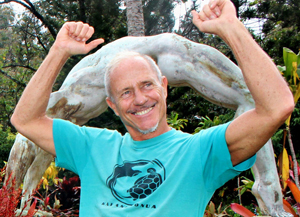
- Founder and Director Emeritus; Kalani Oceanside Retreat; Big Island of Hawai'i
- Born: July 5, 1946 (age 80); Iona, Minnesota
- Known for: Professional Dancer, Arts Patron, Educator: nature, culture, wellness and sustainable living
- Awards: State Legislature of Hawai'i Commendation 2013 "for commitment to nurturing and educating people"
- Website: richkoob.wixsite.com/website

Richard Koob (born 1946) is an American artist, best known as the founder of Kalani Oceanside Retreat, a non-profit retreat center on the Big Island of Hawai'i, and for his contribution to self-development and education.

== Life ==
Koob grew up in a large family in Minnesota, the son of a farmer-businessman father and a musician-gardener mother. He completed his BA in German Literature and Mathematics at St. John's University in Collegeville, Minnesota, with his senior year spent in a study-abroad program at the Albert Ludwig University of Freiburg, Germany. He later received an MFA in Drama/Dance from the University of Hawaiʻi at Mānoa. In his personal life he is active with hula, chorus, writing, life drawing, painting, volleyball, and swimming.

=== Touring as a professional dancer and patron of the arts ===
In 1969, after his senior year of undergraduate studies living in Germany, and three months working and touring as a civil rights activist in Cuba, Koob settled in New York City, where he worked in urban planning, gay and lesbian civil rights, figure modeling, and modern dance. In 1972, he moved to Paris with his dance partner and lifelong companion Hawaiian-born Earnest Morgan. In his memoir, Koob wrote of an exciting, and often hectic, life touring as a professional dancer. At first he and Morgan performed in New York, and later in Paris, and elsewhere in Europe and Asia, including Leningrad, Morocco, and throughout France, with a grand finale at the annual arts festival in Avignon. He wrote of contrasts between the hectic life of performing in New York and Paris and evening walks in the countryside of Southern France, where it was "so easy to breath the joie de vivre and forget that there might be any destination or goal beyond just being itself".

While living in southern France, Koob and Morgan conceived of developing a retreat center in an old monastery where they "could take a centuries long tradition and give it a modern twist to celebrate the arts, nature, health and spirit". After "a couple bouts in Paris with bureaucracy and gendarmes", Koob and Morgan decided to move to Hawaii to pursue their dream of a retreat center. Koob reflected:

we’d stumbled upon the idea to create a retreat center. As much as in times past, the anxious world was again screaming its need for places of refuge. We wanted to touch and heal people with something we had found deep within our selves and our experience. So we were drawn to one of the most beautiful and isolated coasts on the most remote islands in the world.

After ten years touring the western world as professional dancers and patrons of the arts, in 1973 Koob and his companion Morgan moved to Hawai'i, settling in Honolulu on Oahu, as well as living part-time in Hilo and rural Puna on the Big Island of Hawai'i. He helped Morgan found, manage, and fund Dance O Hawai'i, which performed throughout the Islands' communities and schools, as well as in the Asia Pacific region. While completing his MFA, he also performed with the Honolulu Ballet, directed by Morgan, and with other dance companies.

=== Building Kalani Retreat Center ===
Koob and Morgan began building a retreat center focused on self-development and education. In 1975, with help from Koob's family, they purchased the original Kalani Honua property, now expanded to include the Kalani Kai and Kalani Mauka parcels. The 1982 grand opening of Kalani was described by the Island's newspaper as "the best party ever in Puna" (an event now eclipsed by the Kalani-organized Puna Music Festival, which attracts over 6,000 attendees). In 1992, Morgan died of complications of AIDS. According to Koob, "Earnest inspired an enduring creativity and love in all his relations".

Koob continued their work building Kalani Oceanside Retreat, now the largest and oldest retreat center in Hawai'i. He furthered the legacy of Kalani's co-founder by dedicating a large studio – popular for weekly classes, ecstatic dances, and community gatherings – the Earnest Morgan Arts eXuberance (EMAX) pavilion.

Lester John ("LJ") Bates III was appointed as Kalani's Executive Director in November 2012, and after a period of transition Koob officially retired in July 2013. At the Kalani event celebrating his career, the Hawai'I State Legislature awarded him a commendation for his "commitment to nurturing and educating people".

== Contributions ==
=== Co-founder and director of Kalani Oceanside Retreat ===
In 1975 Koob and Earnest Morgan co-founded Kalani. For 38 years Koob served as the director of Kalani Oceanside Retreat. Kalani is a non-profit 501(c)(3) dedicated to nature, culture, and wellness. Koob's philosophy is expressed in Kalani's Mission "to provide a fun, safe and educational retreat village which encourages ALOHA love for life in each person's own deepest way through participation in abundant nature, culture and wellness experiences."

Kalani is built on Koob's concept of "social enterprise", where non-profits apply market strategies to achieve social purpose: "Our goal has never been profit or gain. Our goal was to create a space where people’s lives could transform, and that has extended into the surrounding district with our community programs."

Kalani sponsors an extensive Community Arts Program, with more than 50 offerings per week, typically free to the public or by donation, including offerings of yoga, Hawaiian culture, dance and performing arts, wellness, and personal growth. Kalani also sponsors special events; hosts diverse residential retreats and workshops; provides lodging and meals for guests; oversees volunteer, sabbatical, and visiting artist education programs; and houses a sustainable community of residents in an eco-village.

=== Writing ===
Koob authored a memoir and photo history of Kalani titled Kalani: A Leap of Faith, Hope and Love. The book concludes with a vision for the future: "Hopefully the community and its retreat service will continue to thrive as a place characterized by harmony of heaven, earth and sea — i.e. the blessings of creative play, the joy of giving service, the healing of forgiveness and acceptance — inherent in the Kalani property names: Kalani Honua, Kalani Kai, and Kalani Mauka."

Koob authored a fiction book titled E Ho Mai: a Tale of Youthing under the pen name Richart Likeke Lono Koob. E Ho Mai is a Hawaiian phrase meaning 'let it come', 'let it flow', and "youthing" refers to "a process that has been [one's] focus, and [one's] gift to others, since childhood fantasies". The book focuses on nurturing the many "gifts of youth" and maintaining "child-like awe". E Ho Mai expresses Koob's philosophy of aloha as a way of life:

We were north, south, east and west
our working week and our days of rest
our talk, our dance
our noon, our midnight
We believed that love would last forever
and we were right.

=== Other contributions ===
Over the years, Koob served as the state Arts Coordinator for the Big Island of Hawai'i; taught dance at University of Hawai'i campuses; and promoted understanding and appreciation of Hawaiian culture. He also helped form the Kalapana-Kopoho Neighborhood Organization (KAPONO), actively participated in regional planning for the Puna District, and helped to designate the "Red Road" (Highway 137, Kapoho-Kalapana Road) as a scenic byway.

In conjunction with development of the Kalani 30-Year Plan, Koob has championed sustainable living practices as they relate to the Puna Community Development Plan, the Hawai'i 2050 Sustainability Plan, and the Environmental Protection Agency (EPA) Essential Smart Growth Fixes for Rural Planning, Zoning, and Development Codes.

=== Life work recognition ===
In recognition of Koob's life work, in 2013 the Hawaii State Senate officially announced:

The Twenty-seventh Legislature of the State of Hawai'i hereby commends and congratulates Richard Koob for his pursuit of excellence, the lasting legacy he leaves at Kalani, in the Puna Community, and with the people that have been transformed from their experience at Kalani and extends its very best wishes for continued health, happiness and fulfillment in his retirement.
