= Kalapana, Hawaii =

Kalapana
- Town
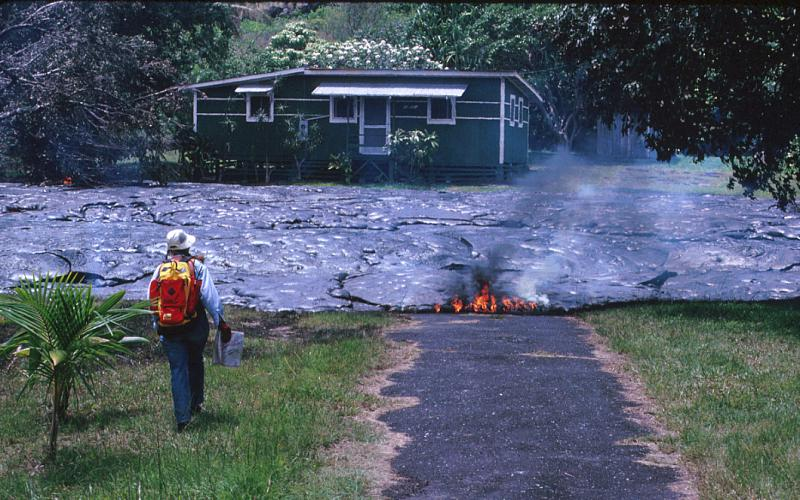
- One of the more than 100 houses that were destroyed by the lava flow in 1990.

- Location within Hawaii
- Coordinates: 19°22′09.5″N 154°57′52.2″W
- Country: United States
- State: Hawaii
- County: Hawaii
- Time zone: UTC-10 (Hawaiian (HST))
- ZIP code: 96778
- Area codes: 808

Kalapana (Hawaiian for 'announce noted place') is a town and a region in the Puna District on the Island of Hawaiʻi in the Hawaiian Islands. The town was the original location of the Star of the Sea Painted Church.

In 1990, lava flows from the Kūpaʻianahā vent of Kīlauea destroyed and partly buried most of the town, as well as Kalapana Gardens and nearby Royal Gardens subdivisions. The lava flow that destroyed Kalapana erupted from the southeast rift zone of Kīlauea. Along with the destruction of Kalapana were those of the nearby town of Kaimū and Kaimū Bay, both of which now lie buried beneath more than 50 feet (15 meters) of lava. The lava flow created a new coastline.

In July 2010, lava from Kīlauea continued into the Kalapana region destroying a home that was only 5 years old, leaving 35 homes remaining in the Kalapana Gardens Subdivision. The 2010 lava flow partly covered the 1986–1992 flow field again, while attracting thousands of visitors a day.

Access to the village was reestablished and a thriving farmers market was held every Wednesday night until May, 2018 when lava flows impacted nearby roads. For many years the lava flow from Puʻu ʻŌʻō continued, for a time entering the sea at Kamokuna. In May 2018, destructive new lava vents opened in nearby Leilani Estates. Access to Kalapana was restricted to residents until July 3, 2018, when the road was reopened to all motorists.

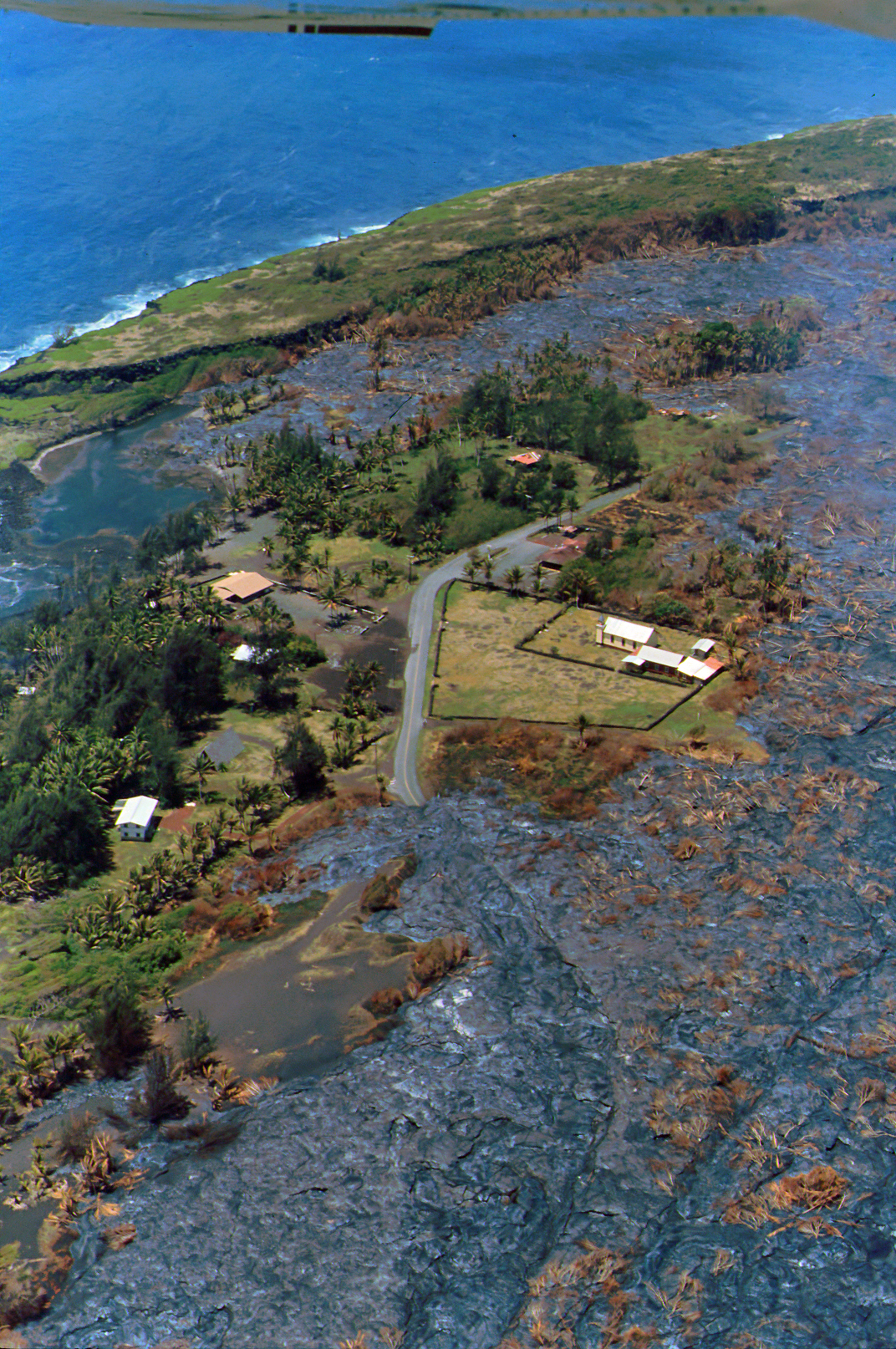
Kalapana-May 24, 1990
