= Puna, Hawaii =

District of Hawaiʻi County, Hawaii

Coordinates: 19°29′37.61″N 155°00′34.88″W

The districts of the Big Island. From Northernmost, clockwise: North Kohala, Hāmākua, North Hilo, South Hilo, Puna (highlighted), Kaʻū, South Kona, North Kona, and South Kohala

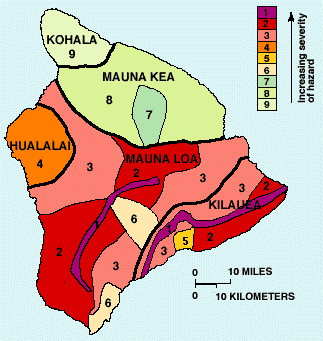
The Island of Hawaiʻi is divided into 9 Lava Flow Hazard Zones, which are unrelated to, and not to be confused with, the 9 District "zones". These Lava Flow Hazard Zones are numbered according to the degree of hazard from inundation by lava flows. Zone 1 is the area of the "greatest" hazard, where lava is most likely to come from the ground, and coincides with the rift zones of the two most active volcanoes (Mauna Loa and Kīlauea). Zone 9, consisting of the extinct volcano Kohala, is the area considered to be of the least hazard, since this area has not had any lava flows in thousands of years. Lava Hazard Zones in Puna are all Lava Hazard Zones 1, 2 and 3; the most dangerous according to the USGS.

Puna is one of the 9 districts of Hawaii County on the Island of Hawaiʻi (Big Island; County of Hawaiʻi). It is located on the windward side (east side) of the island and shares borders with South Hilo district in the north and Kaʻū district in the west. With a size of just under 320,000 acres (1,300 km^{2}) or 500 sq. miles, Puna is slightly smaller than the island of Kauaʻi.

Puna cropland supports floriculture, nurseries and macadamia nuts. Most of the state’s papaya crops are grown in the lower Puna area which is regarded as the best place in the Islands to grow the crop.

The Puna District is subject to frequent lava eruptions and flows, which include the complete destruction of the community of Kapoho, a result of the devastating 2018 lower Puna eruption, as Puna is located on a volcanic rift zone of Kilauea Volcano.

== History ==
=== Kingdom of Hawaii ===
Kalama's map of 1837 shows that Puna was a Moku (traditional district) covering the southeastern corner of the island before the great mahele of the Hawaiian Kingdom.

=== Recent lava activity ===
Kīlauea is one of the world's most active volcanoes, and until August 2018 was continuously in action since 1983 along Kīlauea's East Rift Zone, and closely monitored by the Hawaii Volcano Observatory. The Royal Gardens subdivision and the villages of Kaimu and Kalapana were largely destroyed by lava flows and in the Fall of 2014, lava briefly touched the outskirts of Pahoa, the main village in Puna, before halting and seeking a new course south into the ocean at Kamokuna.

Hawaii Volcanoes National Park, when constructed, had two entrances. The entrance from lower Puna was cut off in 1986, and several miles of the road along the ocean were covered by several flows that occurred over the course of the eruption. Millions of tourists came each year to witness the spectacle of a torrent of lava plunging into the sea and exploding as it hit the water. Lava flows continued to add new land to the old shoreline, often resulting in an unstable delta that periodically formed cracks and broke off into the sea; visitors were provided with viewing stations at a safe distance.

==== 2014 lava flow ====
In June 2014, a lava flow dubbed the June 27th flow started flowing from a vent of a spatter cone called Puʻu ʻŌʻō on the east rift zone of Kīlauea Volcano in a northwest direction towards the villages of Kaohe Homesteads and Pahoa.

In early September it appeared that the lava flow was en route to the small community of Kaohe Homesteads. Community leaders and state officials began to draw up plans for evacuations and the mayor signed an emergency proclamation as residents of the Kaohe Homesteads subdivision learned that lava from Kilauea Volcano was just 0.8 miles (1.3 km) away and could reach them within a week. On September 13, a release from the Hawaiian Volcano Observatory stated that the flow had begun to shift away from the subdivision as it had interacted with both the cracks and down-dropped blocks within the East Rift Zone of Kīlauea volcano and a natural valley that leveled away from Kaohe Homesteads.

In early October 2014, the lava flow was heading towards the community of Pahoa, Hawaii. On October 25, the flow had crossed Cemetery Road at Apa'a Road near the Pahoa Recycling and Transfer Station, a waste/trash station, which was closed and relocated due to the lava flow. The flow was quickly advancing on a nearby cemetery and triggered the first series of evacuations. On November 10, the flow claimed a home.

Officials feared that if the lava flow continued on its path it would cover and close the only route in and out of lower Puna, Highway 130. On October 22, The National Park Service announced that it would help state and county officials create an emergency route along 8 miles of the buried Chain of Craters Road in order to help Puna residents who would lose access to the rest of Hawai‘i if that lava flow covered Highway 130. Construction of the Chain of Craters alternate route began by making a path over a wall of lava rock covering the road in Hawaii Volcanoes National Park. The $12 million to $15.5 million route, to be re-established between the park and Kalapana as a gravel road, would have been the only road in and out of lower Puna, if the June 27 lava flow had made its way to the sea. The park closed the end of Chain of Craters Road as construction began. Nearly 8 miles of the roadway, officially known as Chain of Craters Road inside the park and Highway 130 outside of it, had been covered by past flows from the ongoing Puʻu ʻŌʻō eruption that threatened Pahoa. Chain of Craters Road, which opened in 1965, had portions blocked or covered by lava for 37 years of its 49-year existence, according to the park. The road is about 19 miles long inside the park.

The lava flow stopped just short of the village of Pahoa. In 2016 a new flow (called Episode 61G by the United States Geological Survey) emerged from Puʻu ʻŌʻō in a southerly direction, the shortest way to the ocean, across an area that had been covered in lava during the preceding decades. The emergency road connecting Hwy 130 to the Chain of Craters Road was severed by the new flow. In 2018 this road was again cleared through the 2016 lava to provide emergency access around the 2018 lower Puna eruption.

==== 2018 eruption ====
On May 3, 2018, a fissure opened and lava started spewing out on Mohala Street in Leilani Estates. By June 5, 2018, reports from Hawai'i County officials indicated that hundreds of homes in several subdivisions had been destroyed by the ongoing eruption. By early August, when the eruption ended, over 13.7 square miles had been covered by lava, including about 875 acres of new land offshore.

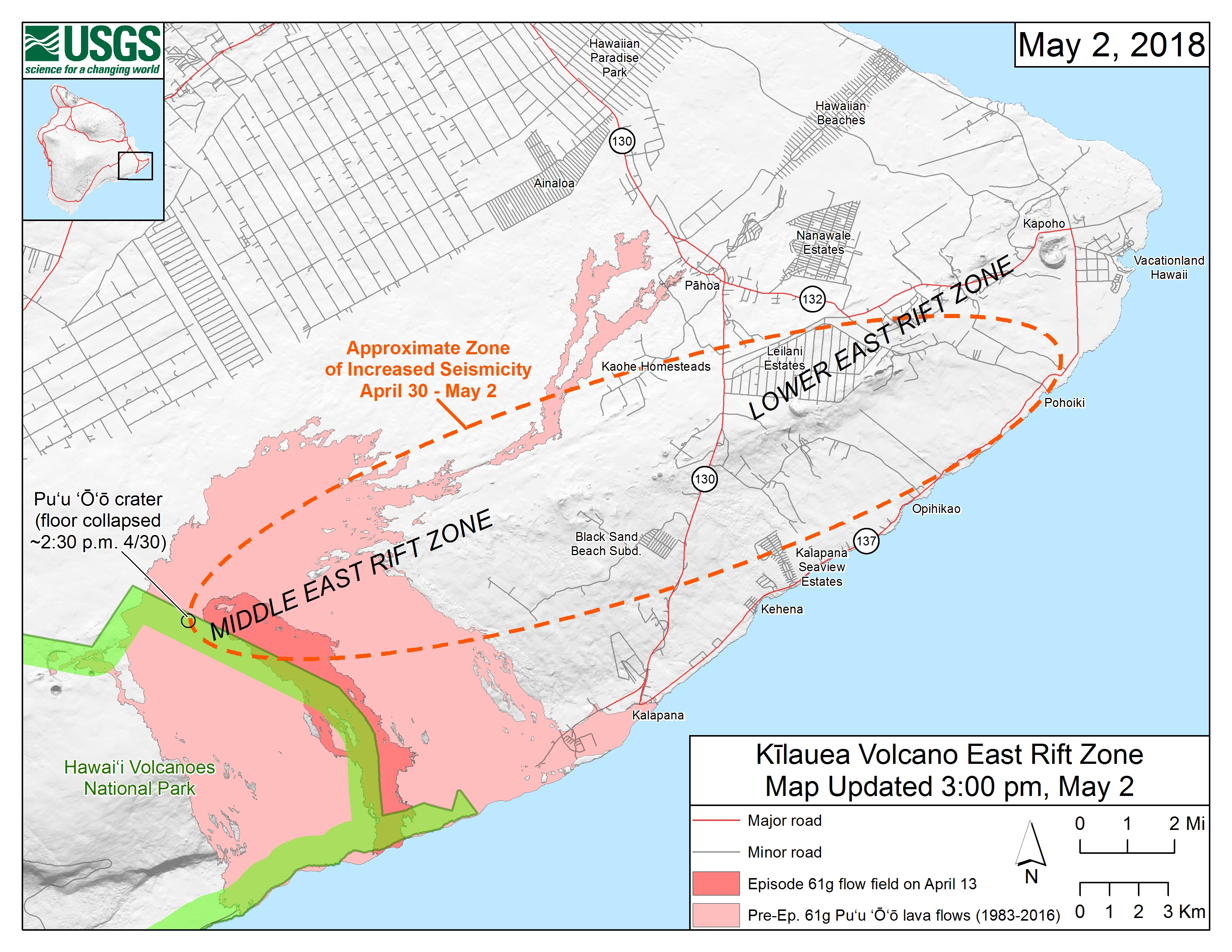
Map of ongoing intrusion and earthquake activity along Kīlauea's East Rift Zone (May 2, 2018)

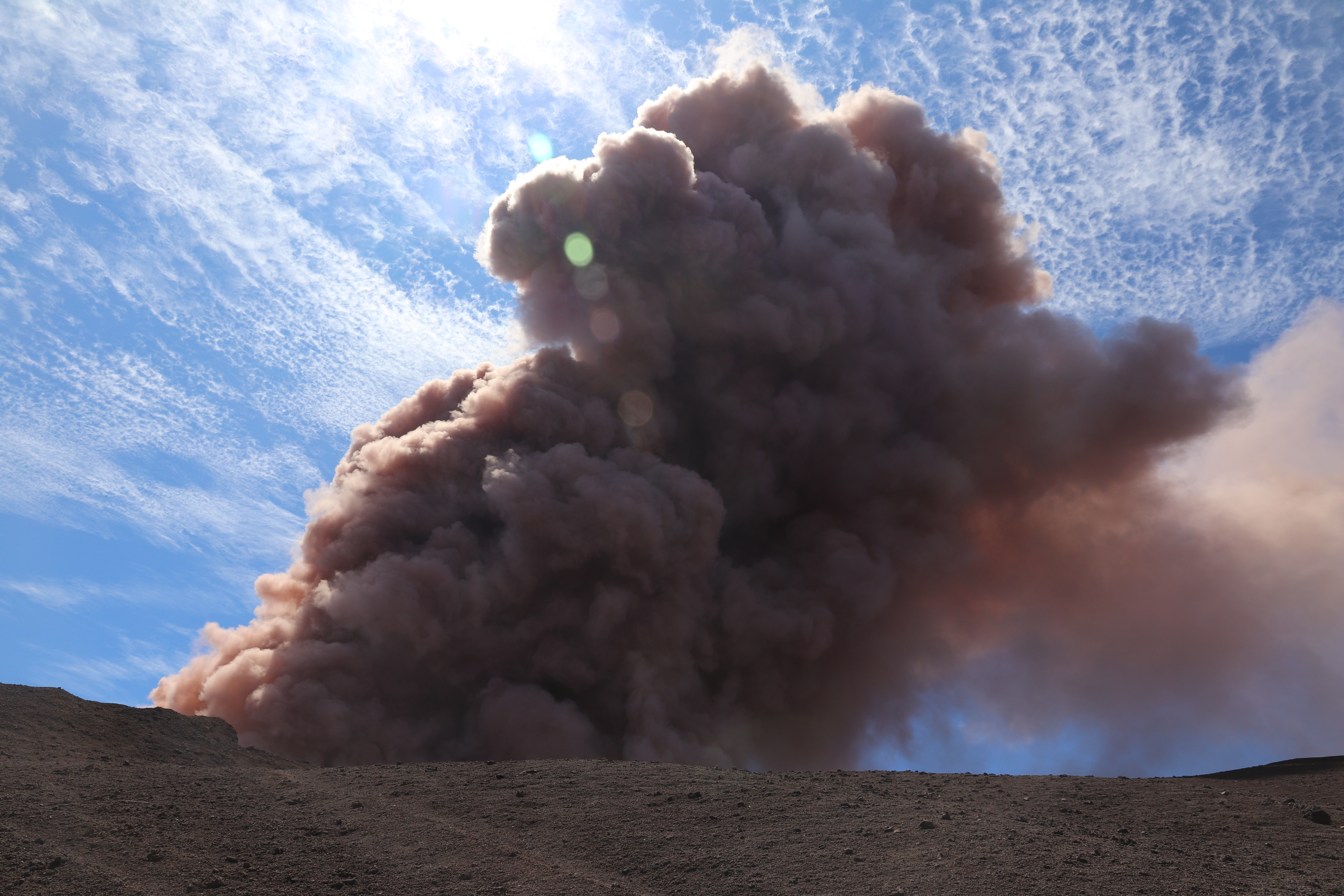
Collapse in the crater of Pu‘u ‘Ō‘ō, creating an ash plume (May 3, 2018)

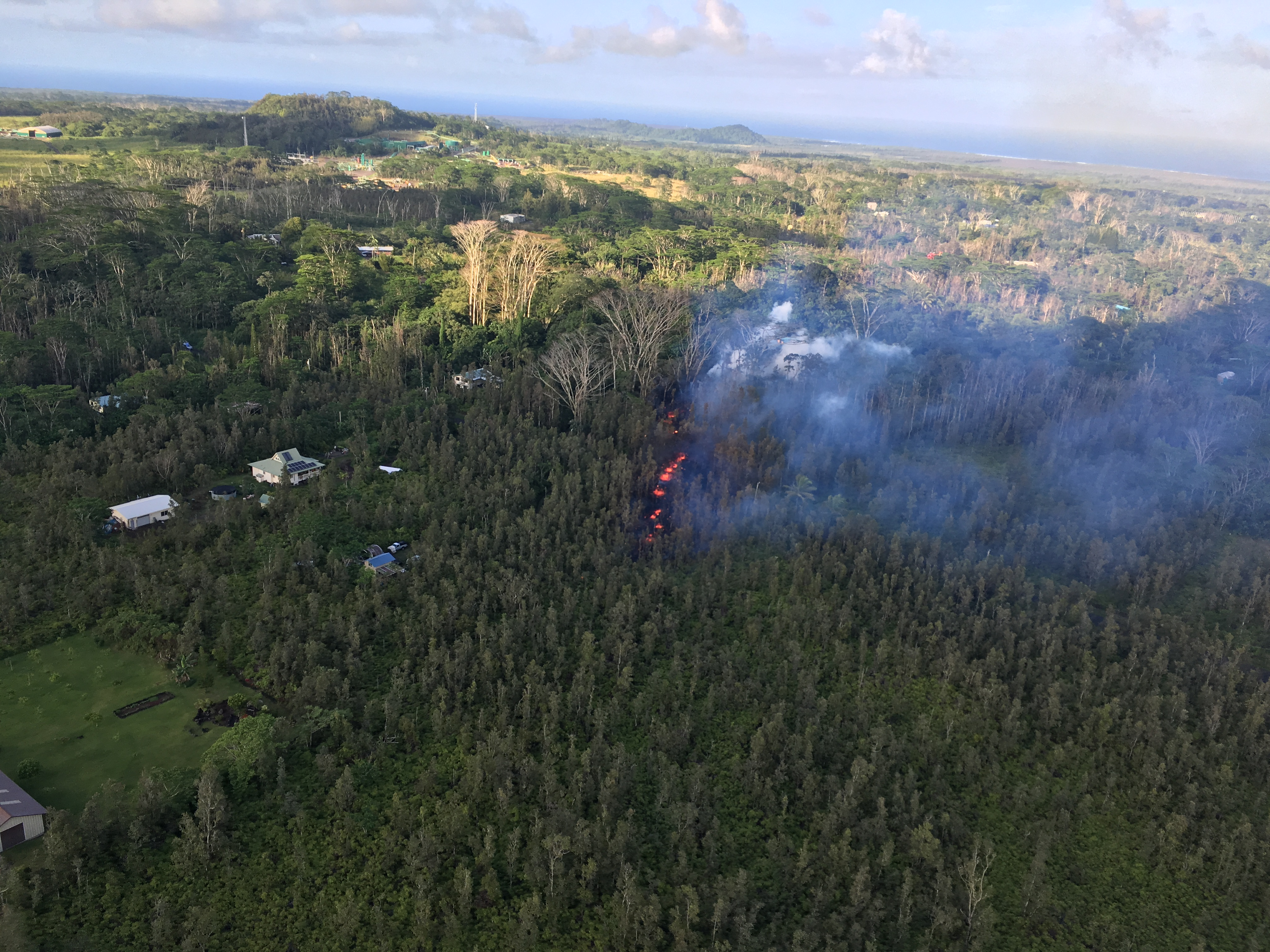
Eruption in the Leilani Estates subdivision (May 3, 2018)

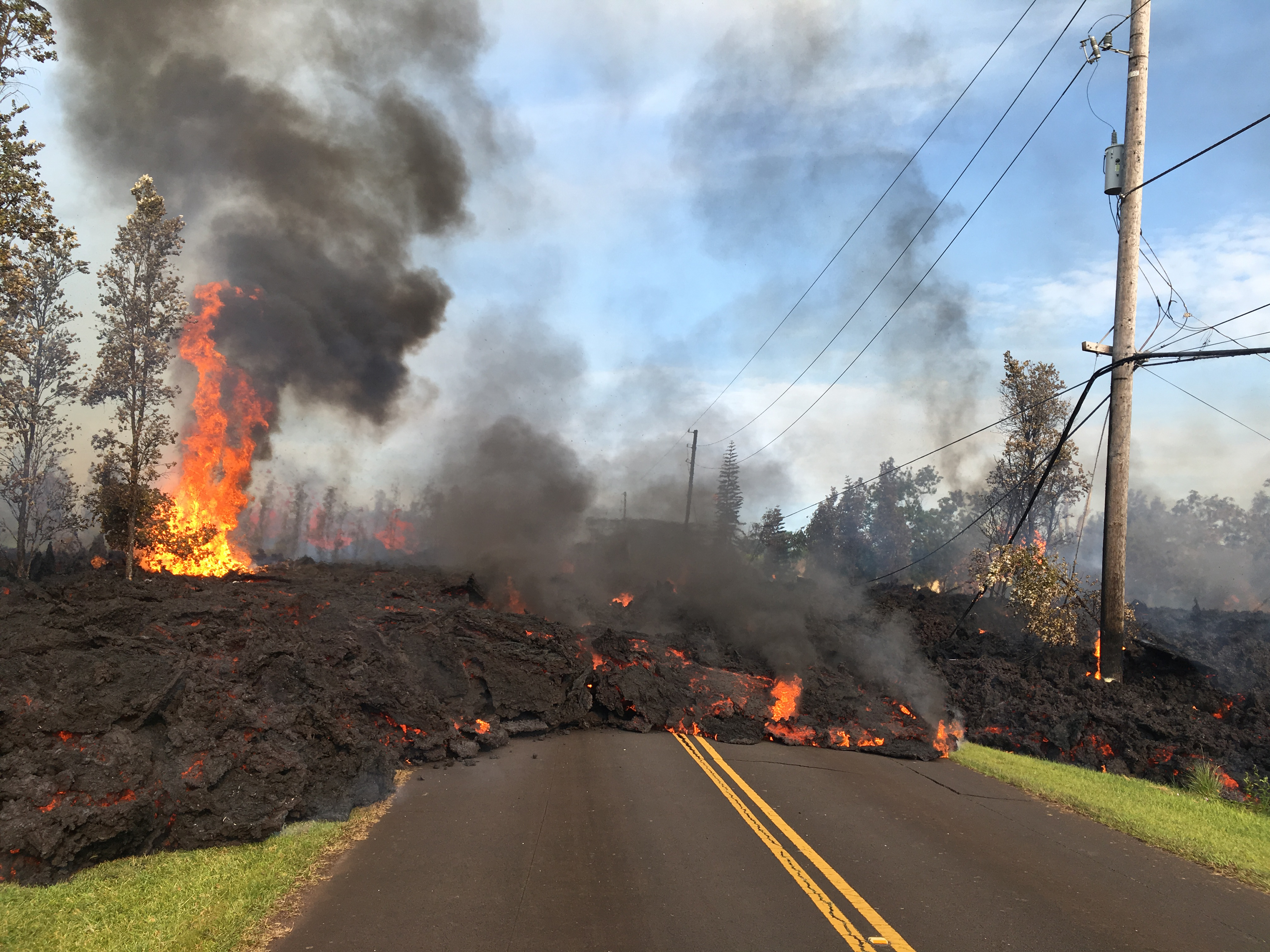
Lava from a fissure slowly advanced to the northeast on Hoʻokāpu Street in Leilani Estates subdivision (May 5, 2018)

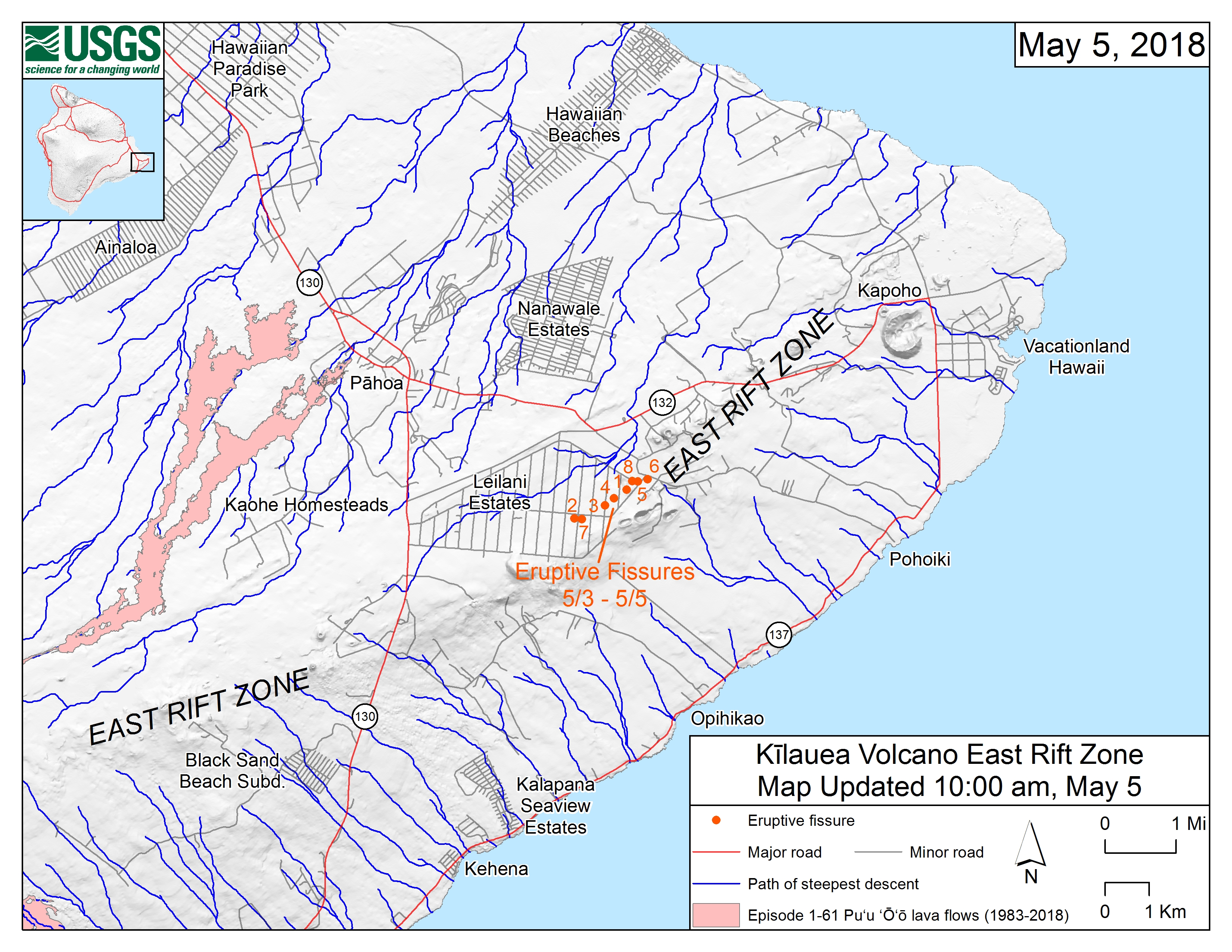
Map of the locations of eruptive fissures (May 5, 2018)

== Geography ==
=== Communities ===
For statistical purposes, the United States Census Bureau has defined many of these communities as a census-designated places (CDP). The census definition of these areas may not precisely correspond to local understanding of the area with the same name.

- ʻĀinaloa
- Black Sands
- Eden Roc
- Fern Acres
- Fern Forest
- Glenwood
- Hawaiian Acres
- Hawaiian Beaches
- Hawaiian Paradise Park
- Kalapana
- Kapoho
- Keaʻau
- Kehena
- Kurtistown
- Leilani Estates
- Mountain View
- Nānāwale Estates
- Orchidland
- Pāhoa
- Vacationland Hawaii
- Volcano Village

=== Housing ===
The affordable housing prices have led to an enormous increase in developments in Puna, and have made this district the fastest growing area on the Big Island. Between 1990 and 2020 the population increased by 150% and slightly surpassed the population of the South Hilo district (including the city of Hilo), which in comparison only grew by about 15%. However, between 2002 and 2006 the price of houses more than doubled and the price of vacant land increased over fivefold, as increasing numbers of people from outside the district (often from the mainland U.S.) bought into the last affordable market in the state.

Homeowners Insurance can be more difficult to secure in the parts of Puna that are located in Lava Flow Hazard Zones 1 or 2. The entire Kīlauea rift zone region is in Zone 1, while the southeastern slope is in Zone 2. Most home insurance companies will not cover homes in Zone 1 or 2 for values over $350,000. Most of the volcanic destruction of private property in Hawaiʻi since the 20th century has occurred in lower Puna, including the destruction of sections of Kapoho, Royal Gardens, Kalapana and Kaimū. Since 1983 (but prior to 2018), lava flows destroyed about 190 structures and covered approximately 50 square miles out of the 500 square miles of Puna. Living in Puna has some other unique considerations. For example, most homes in Puna rely on rainwater catchment for their household water. This lack of water availability for firefighting is also an issue with insurance companies.

=== Climate ===
The climate is a mild tropical climate with abundant rainfall, especially in the northern parts and areas of higher elevation. The terrain is characterized by gentle slopes with no defined waterways. Although rainfall is occasionally very heavy (one storm in 2003 brought 36 inches (90 cm) of rain in 24 hours), flooding is rare due to the slope and porosity of the volcanic rock. The vegetation ranges from rainforest to desert shrub and coastal strand. Large areas of native forest are present in the Wao Kele o Puna and Kahauala tracts.

== Places of interest ==
Besides visiting the active Kīlauea volcano and the formerly active and now cooled lava flows in the area of Kalapana, another interesting site within the Puna district was the heated tide pools at Ahalanui Beach Park (aka Puʻalaʻa County Park), where spring water was naturally heated through geothermal energy and this mixed with ocean water along the shoreline. Prior to the eruption in 1960 at Kapoho, the pools were not heated but were cold; in 2018 the park was overrun by lava.

- Hawaii Volcanoes National Park, (the entrance is inside the district of Kaʻū)
- Issac Hale Beach Park (Pohoiki) (was heavily affected by the 2018 eruption and has since reopened)
- Mauna Loa Macadamia Nut Corporation

== Notable people ==
- Arthur Johnsen, Artist
- William "Billy" Kenoi, Mayor of Hawaiʻi County (2008–2016)
- Harry Kim, Mayor of Hawaiʻi County (2000–2008 and 2016–2020)
- Jason Scott Lee, Actor, owner and creator of Ulua Theatre, Volcano Village resident
- Joseph Nāwahī, Native Hawaiian legislator, newspaper publisher, and painter
- Emily Naeole, Hawaiʻi County Councilwoman
- Abra Moore, Folk-styled rock singer-songwriter
- William H. Shipman, Founder of W. H. Shipman Ltd., agricultural entrepreneur, and major private land owner in Puna

== Gallery ==
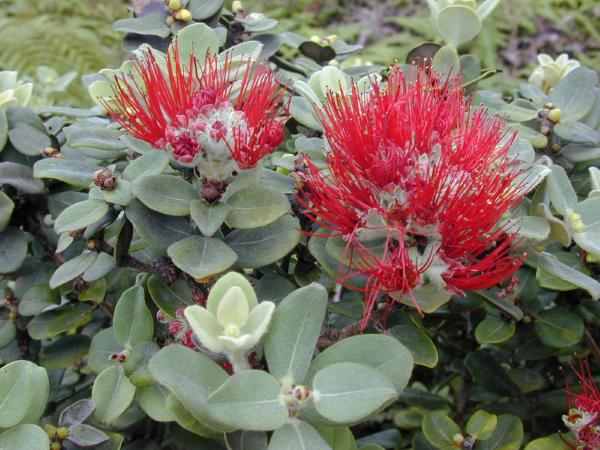
ʻŌhiʻā lehua is the predominant endemic tree found in Puna.

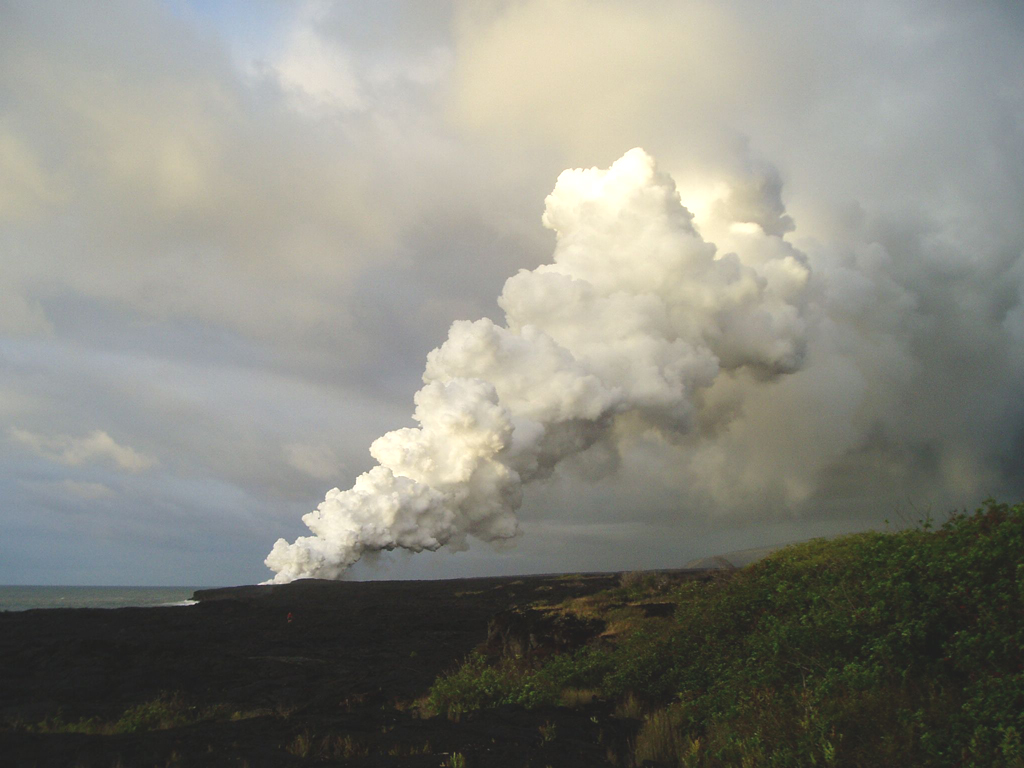
Kupaianaha lava flow plume in Puna near Kalapana.

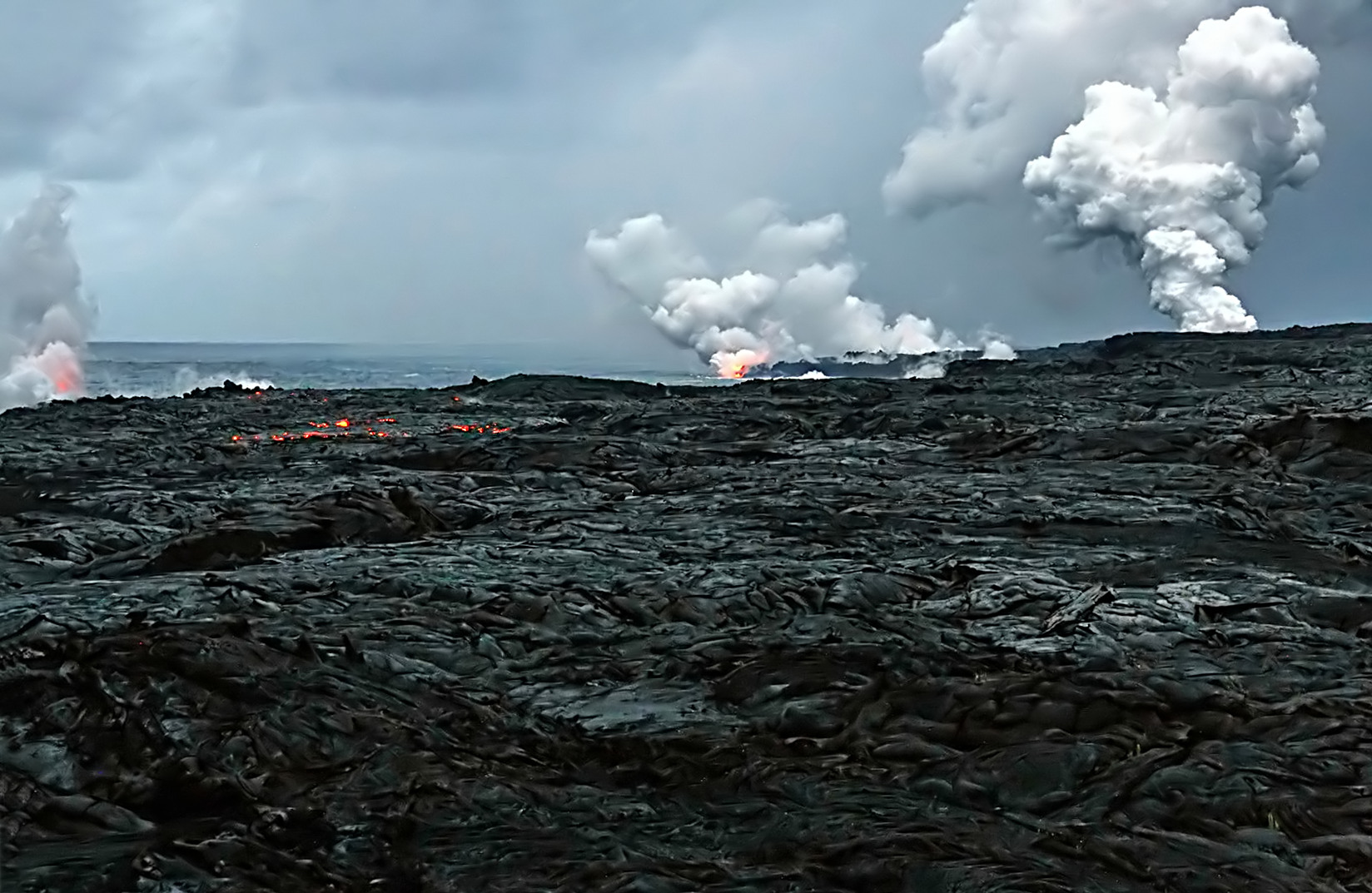
Three entries plus Waikupanaha in April 2008.

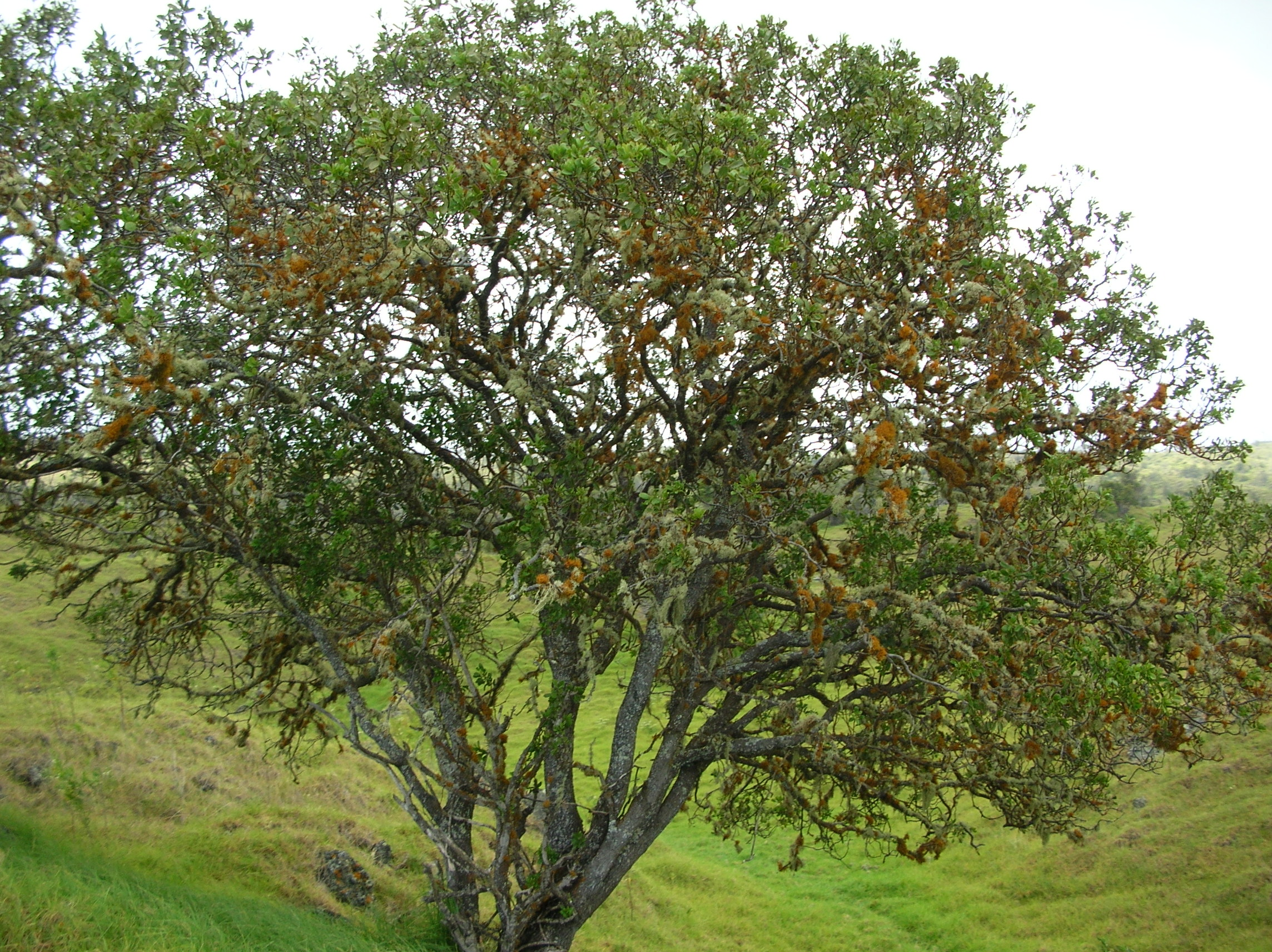
Sandalwood was abundant in Puna prior to the early 1820s.

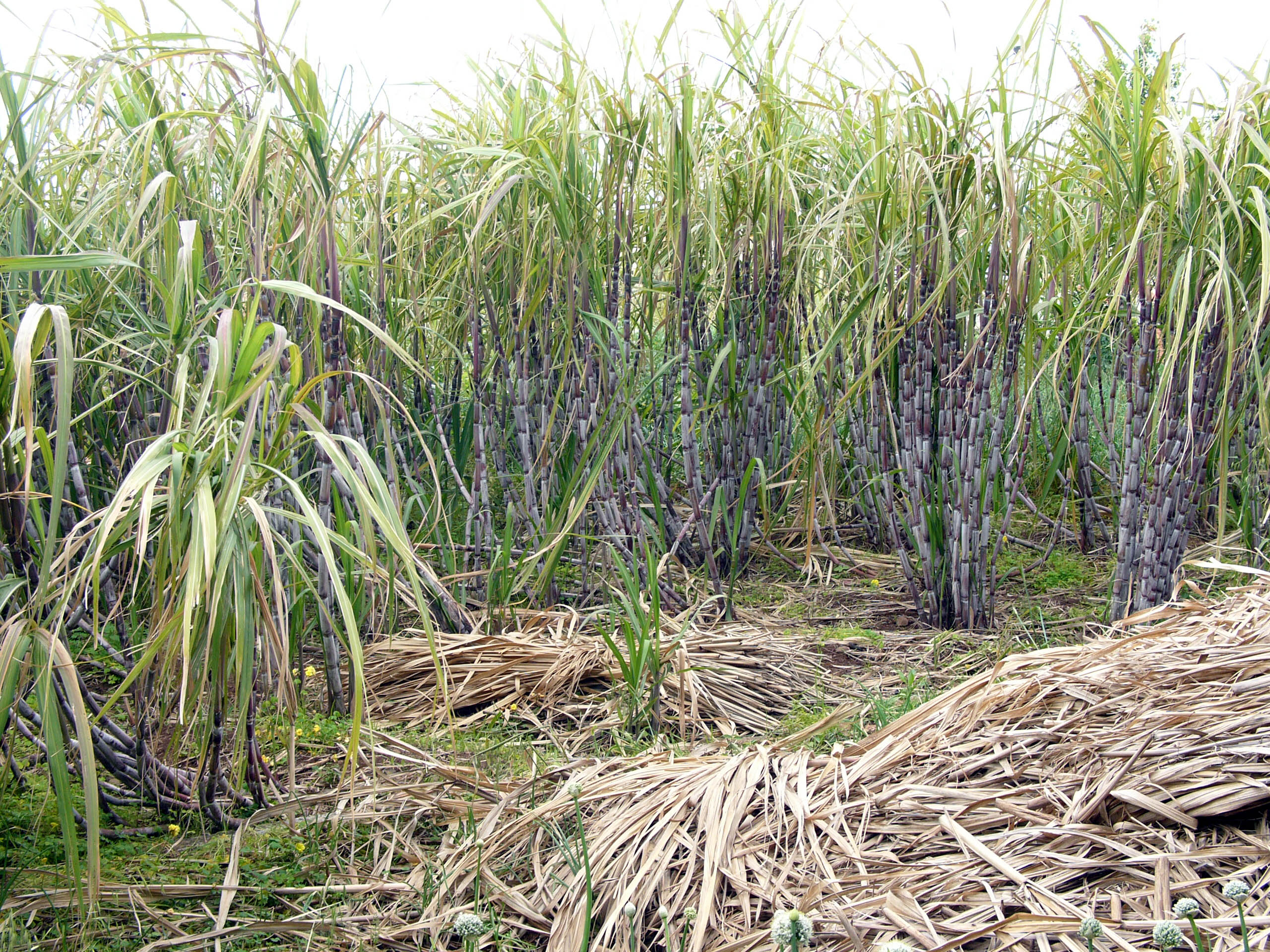
Sugarcane was the main agricultural product in Puna for the 20th century.

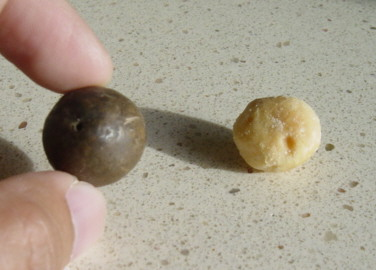
Macadamia nuts, pictured here in the shell & as a dry roasted nut, are still a significant agricultural industry in Puna.

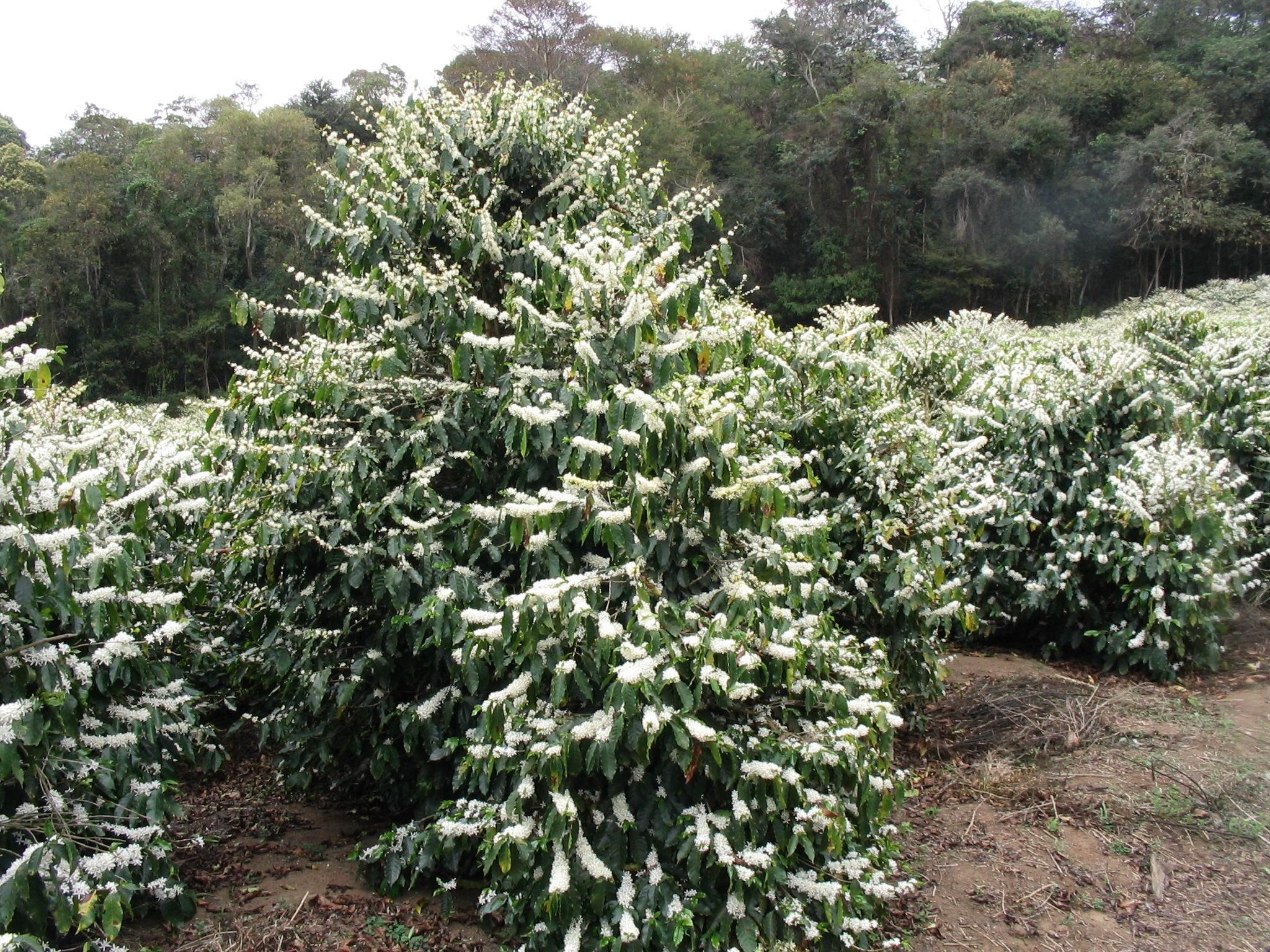
Coffee was the main crop in the 1800s for Puna and has recently made a return.

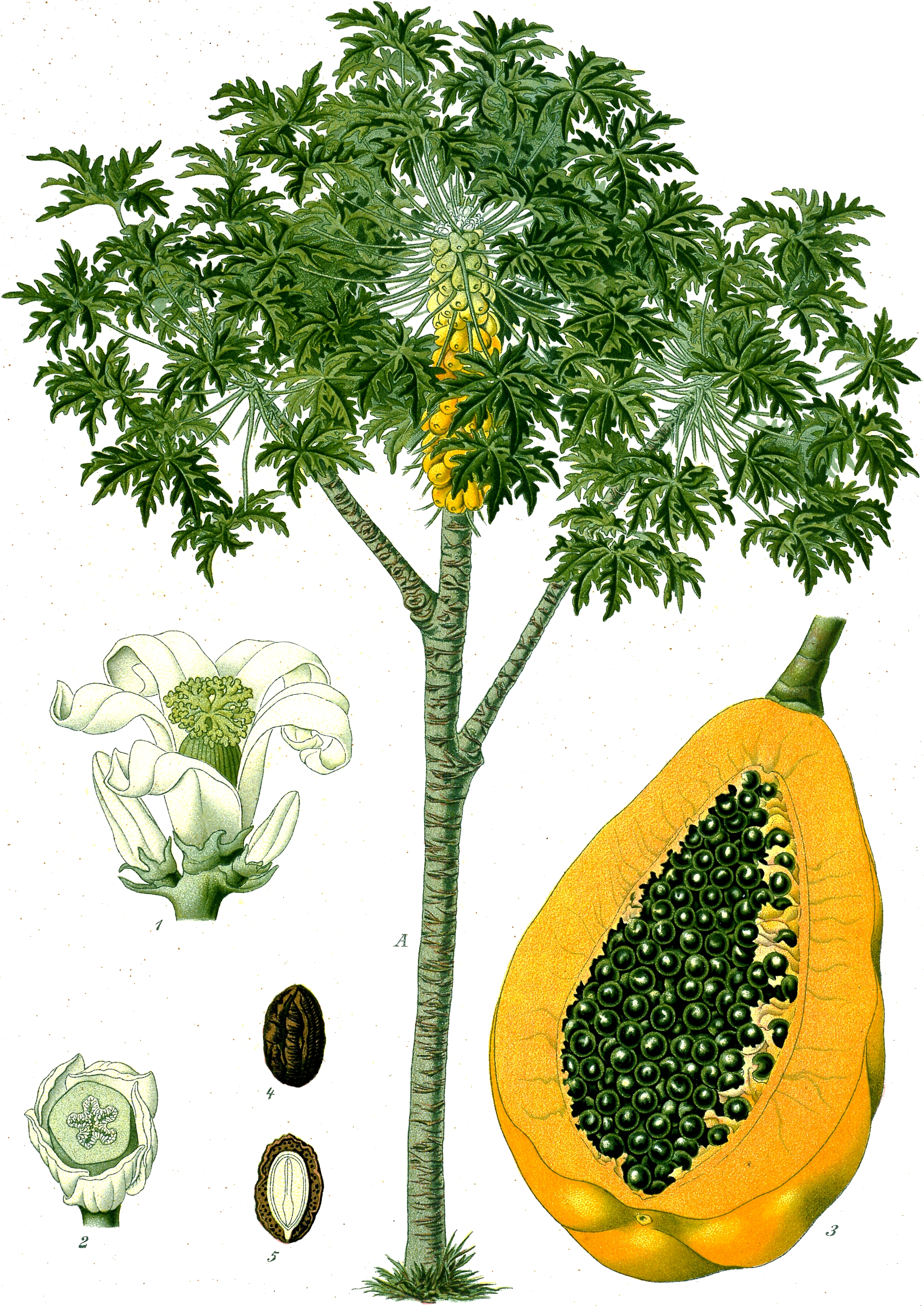
Papaya from Hawaiʻi is almost exclusively from Puna.

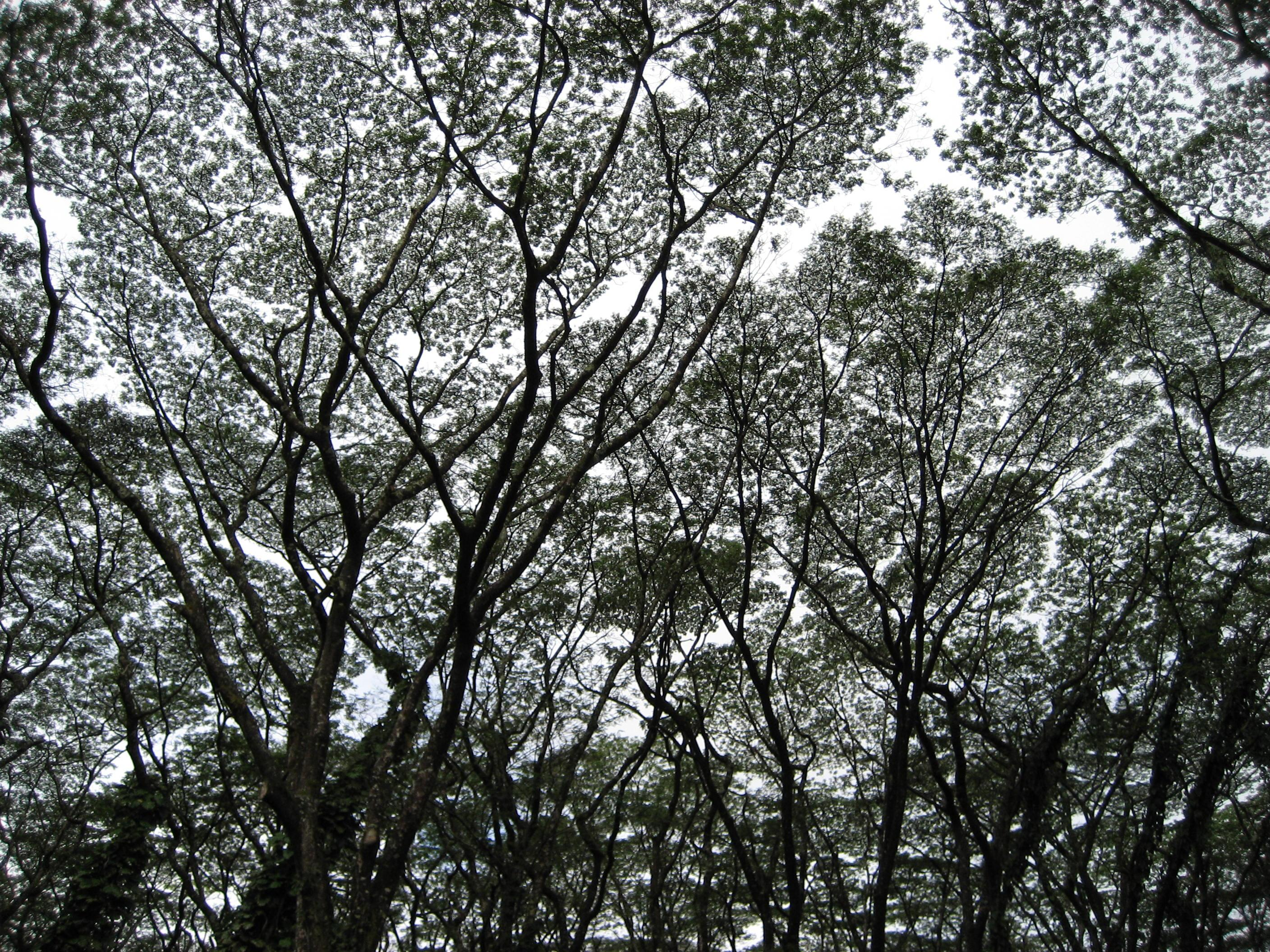
Albizia trees are a seriously invasive species throughout the District of Puna, as evidenced by this picture near the "Tree Tunnel" at Lava Tree State Park.

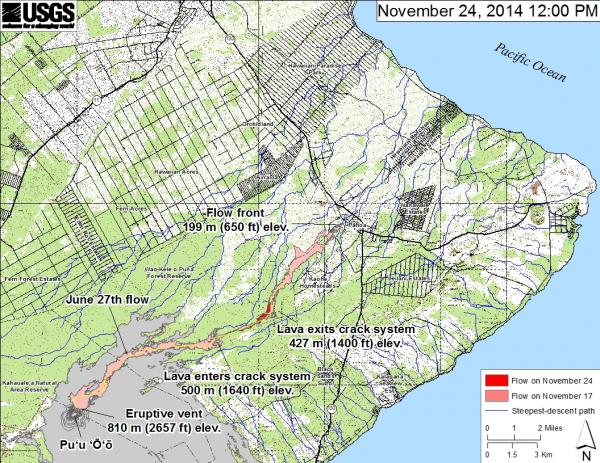
A map showing the flow direction of the June 27th Lava Flow (as of 11/24/14).

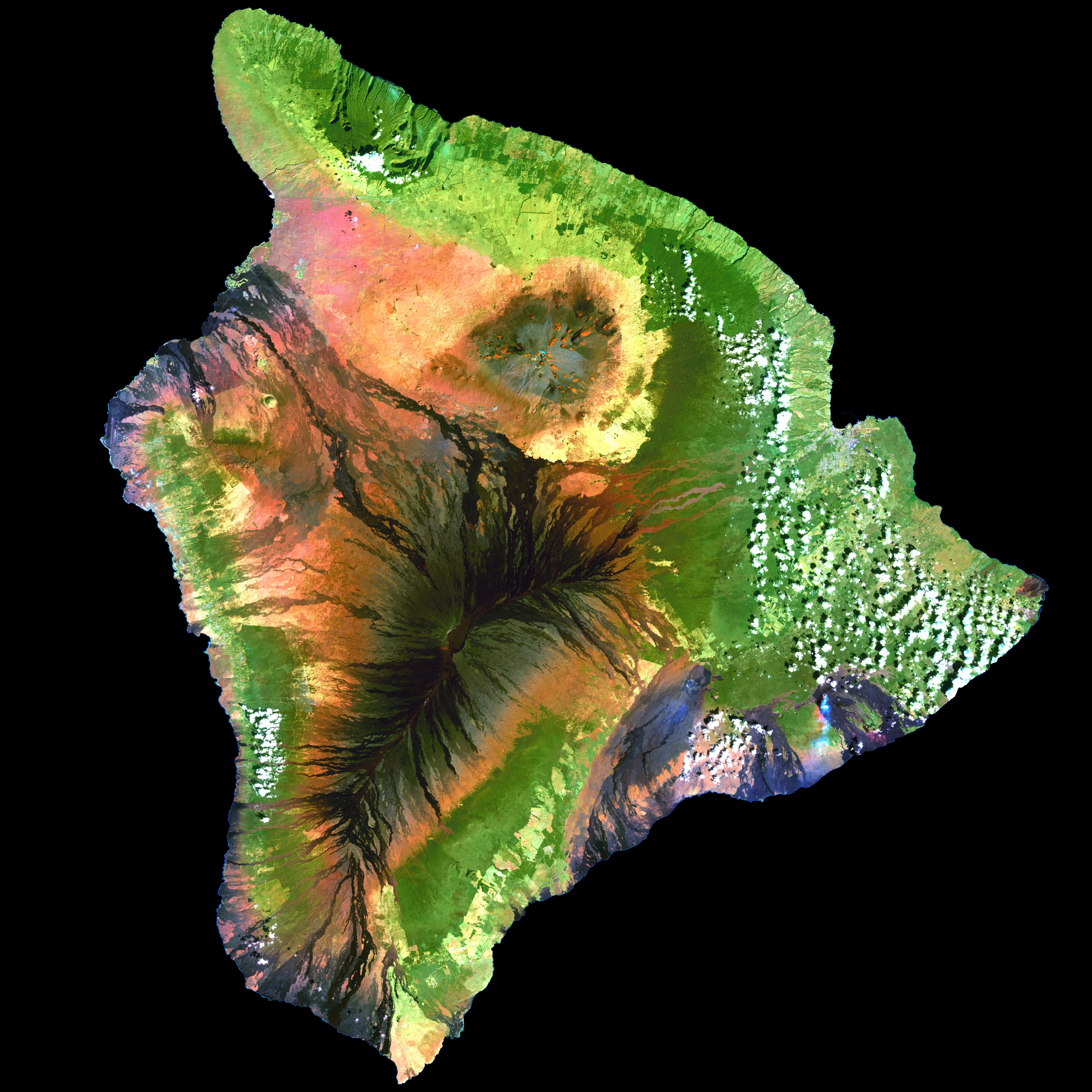
This satellite image shows how most of Puna is covered in a lush green canopy, with some visible lava flows in the District of Puna.

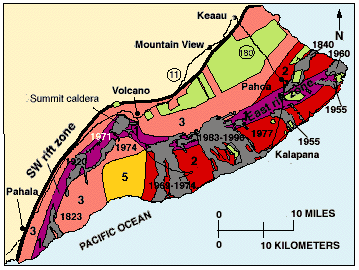
All of the eastern flank of Kīlauea lies within the District of Puna with a small portion of Mauna Loa running along the northern boundary. The flows erupted since 1800 are shown in gray and dated. Twenty-eight percent of the area encompassed by Zones 1 and 2 on the east half of the volcano have been covered by lava since 1955. The major housing subdivisions of Puna are shown in green.
