= List of ghost towns in Hawaii =

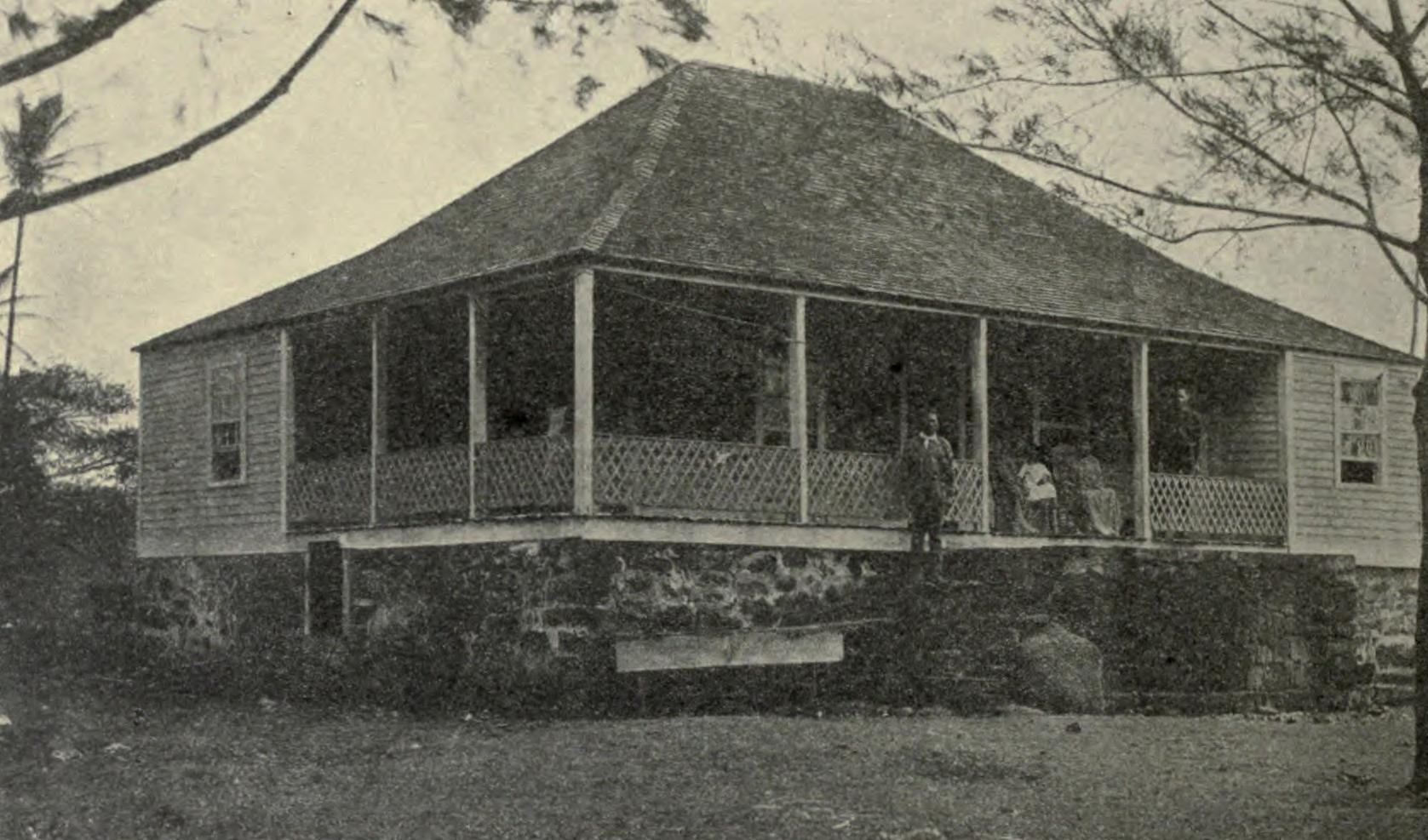
A house in Kaimū, Hawaii in 1888. Kaimu was completely destroyed by an eruptive flow of lava from the Kūpaʻianahā vent of the Kīlauea volcano in 1990.

== List of ghost towns in Hawaii ==
Town name	Dis. Est	County	Notes	Refs
‘Āpua	1868	Hawaii	Destroyed by a tsunami following the April 2, 1868 Hawaii earthquake; never resettled.	
Ferndale		Hawaii	Little is known about this town, but it seems like it was subsumed after a certain point by Kurtistown.	
Hālawa	1950s	Molokai	Abandoned after tsunamis in 1946 and 1957	
Halstead Plantation	1898	Honolulu	Replaced by the Waialua Sugar Mill, following a fire.	
Hamakuapoko Plantation	1970s	Maui	Following plantation closures, in 1972 the high school students moved to the recently built school at Kahului. Eventually depopulating the area.	
Ho‘okena		Hawaii	Following the 1951 Kona earthquake, multiple storms & tsunamis; Residents moved north towards Captain Cook. Depopulating the town over the following decades.	
Honu‘apo	1946	Hawaii	Destroyed in 1946 by a tsunami	
Iwilei	1890s	Honolulu	The costal area of Iwilei was eventually subsumed by Honolulu	
Kaimū	1990	Hawaii	Destroyed in 1990 by an eruptive flow of lava from the Kūpaʻianahā vent of Kīlauea	
Kalapana		Hawaii	Original location of Star of the Sea Painted Church. In 1990, lava flows from the Kūpaʻianahā vent of Kīlauea destroyed and partly buried most of the town.	
Kalaupapa		Kalawao	formerly a lepar colony, the village site rests in the Kalaupapa National Historical Park	
Kalawao	1910s	Kalawao	A hospital complex was built at Kalawao to conduct research into Hansen's disease, and from 1909 to 1913 the US Leprosy Investigation Station was operated there. When that facility closed, the settlement was abandoned in favor of Kalaupapa.	
Kapoho	2018	Hawaii	Destroyed by the 1960 Kīlauea eruption, rebuilt and destroyed again in 2018 by the Puna eruption.	
Kawailoa	1997	Honolulu	Mill camp for the Waialua Sugar Company	
Kaunolū	1880s	Maui	From around 1778 into the 1800s, during Kamehameha I's reign, Kaunolu was a popular fishing village	
Kaʻūpūlehu	1801	Hawaii	This village was destroyed via the 1801 Huʻehuʻe flow.	
Kealakomo	1864	Hawaii	The town was likely destroyed and abandoned after the 1868 earthquake and tsunami, then buried by the Mauna Ulu flows of 1969-1974.	
Keomuku Village	1950s	Maui	Population moved to Lanai City, following the failure of the Maunalei Sugar Company	
Kualoa Sugar Plantation	1870s	Honolulu	Kualoa Sugar Mill closed its operations in 1870	
Lihu‘e Sugar Plantation	2000	Kauaʻi	Lihu’e Plantation Company on Kauaʻi originated in 1849 as a partnership between Charles Reed Bishop, Judge William Little Lee, Henry A. Pierce of Boston and H Hackfeld & Co	
Māhukona	1950s	Hawaii	By 1937, the Kohala Sugar Company had consolidated into the mill at Māhukona, and became Mahukona Terminals Ltd. In 1941 the port closed for World War II and the railroad track shut down 4 years later.	
Makalawena	1946	Hawaii	The fishing village was situated at ʻŌpaeʻula Pond, and subsequently destroyed in the 1946 tsunami.	
Makee Sugar Plantation	1933	Kauaʻi	In 1877, Capt. James Makee from ‘Ulupalakua on Maui, was joined by King Kalakaua and several prominent businessmen in purchasing the Ernest Krull sugar estate on the island of Kauaʻi. The purchase of this land established the Makee Sugar Company at Kapa’a.	
Mānā Camp	1950s	Kauaʻi	Now part of the Mānā Plains Forest Reserve	
Manāka‘a Fishing Village	1868	Hawaii	Destroyed by a tsunami following the April 2, 1868 Hawaii earthquake. This land was commonly associated with Tūtū Pukui, Who frequented the area.	
Nīnole (Ka‘ū)	1860s	Hawaii	The village was the birthplace of Henry ʻŌpūkahaʻia, It was mostly destroyed by a tsunami after the 1868 Hawaii earthquake.	
Koloa Sugar Plantation	1874	Kauaʻi	The old mill was replaced by a much larger one in 1912 to accommodate the demand and rise of the sugar cane industry	
Waiākea Town	1960	Hawaii	Tsunamis devastated Waiākea-Kai, with the largest in 1946 and 1960.	
Waialeʻe Industrial School for Boys	1950s	Honolulu	Opened in 1903, the Waialeʻe Industrial School for Boys incarcerated children for petty theft and truancy. Sometimes, they were leased out to families for domestic duties.	
Waialua Sugar Plantation	1996	Honolulu	The Waialua Sugar Mill closed in October, 1996 due to profit concerns and was the last sugarcane plantation on the island of Oahu to close	
