= 1960 eruption of Kīlauea =

1960 volcano eruption

Eruption of Kīlauea in 1960
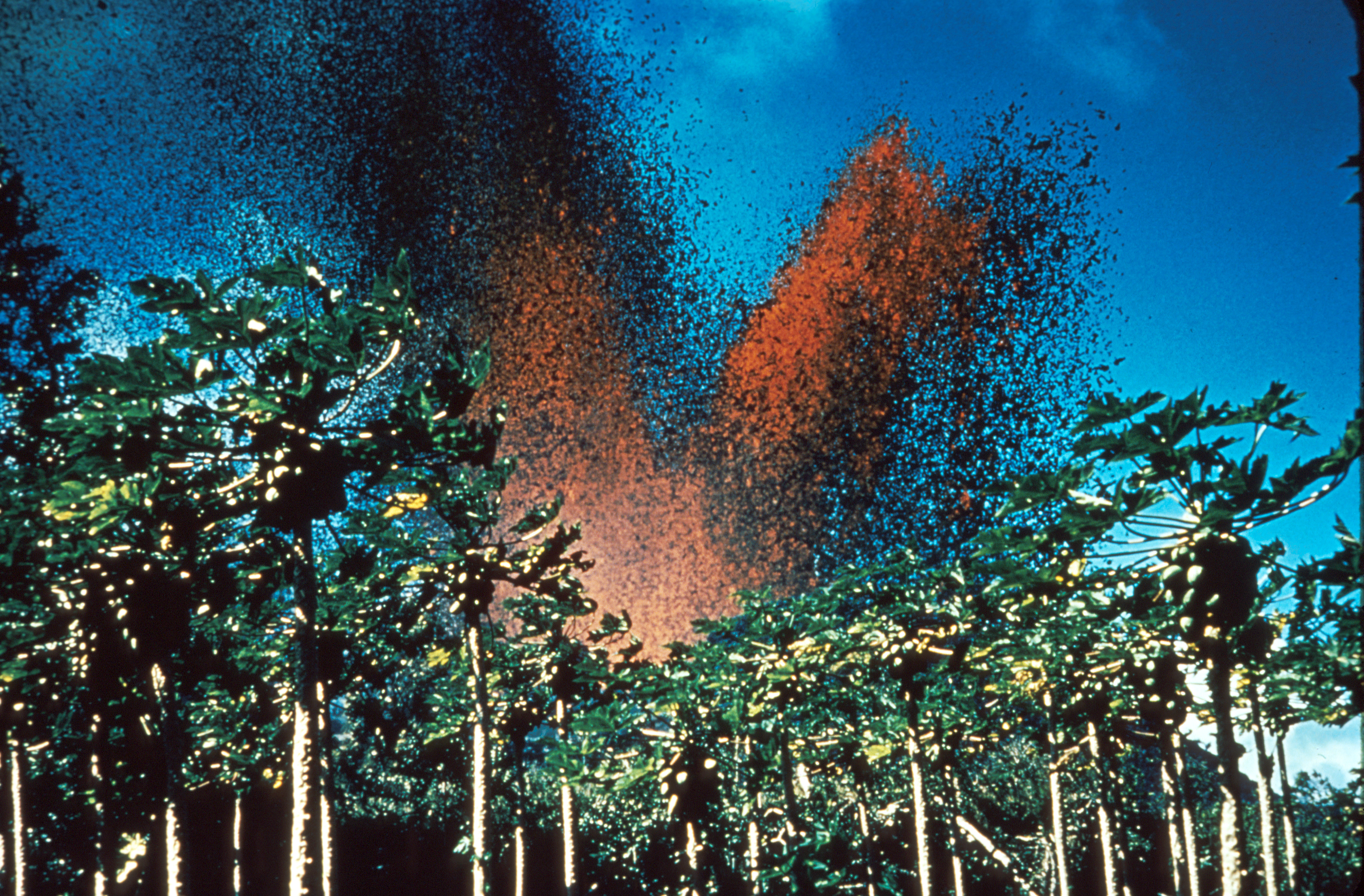
- Fountains of lava above papaya trees at the start of the eruption.
- Volcano: Kīlauea
- Start date: January 13, 1960
- End date: February 19, 1960
- Type: Hawaiian, strombolian, phreatomagmatic
- Location: United States, Hawai
- Volume: 122 × 106 m3 of lava 7.5 × 106 m3 tephras
- VEI: 2
- Impact: Kapoho and Cape Kumukahi
- Deaths: Any

The 1960 eruption of Kīlauea occurred from January 13 to February 19, 1960, on Kīlauea, the most active volcano in Hawaii, US. It followed the eruption of late 1959 in Kīlauea Iki, near the volcano's summit. Fissure vents opened up on the eastern tip of the island of Hawaii, just outside the town of Kapoho. Fountains of lava erupt from these fissures, forming a flow that advances into the Pacific Ocean. As the lava threatened homes, several makeshift dykes were erected in quick succession, but they were soon overtopped and Kapoho was finally destroyed. At the summit of the volcano, earthquakes hit the caldera rim and three collapses affect the floor of the Halemaʻumaʻu crater, with lava appearing as a remnant of a previous eruption. After an eruption lasting just over a month, the third most powerful to hit Kīlauea in the 20th century, the lava covered more than 10 square kilometers of land, including 2 square kilometers of sea, and pushed Cape Kumukahi, the easternmost point of the island of Hawaii, a little further east.

== Background ==
At the end of 1959, from November 14 to December 19, Kīlauea erupted in the Kīlauea Iki crater at the summit of the volcano. This eruption was considered exceptional for the records set and the phenomena never before observed: emission of a volume of 102 × 106 cubic meters of lava in the form of a 580-meter-high fountain, formation of a 126.2-meter-deep lava lake where waves, rapids, waterfalls, and lava whirlpools were observed. A two-way communication between the magma chamber and the surface has been established, with lava flowing back into the underground reservoir between two lava fountains. Together with the arrival of additional magma in the magma chamber, this circulation was one of the causes of the 1960 eruption, since at the end of Kīlauea Iki's eruption, the volcano's interior contained more lava than at the start of the eruption. This did not affect the volcano's internal pressure, which increased. Once the lava fountains have dried up, volcanologists at the Hawaiian Volcanic Observatory are on the alert for a new eruption.

== Course ==
=== First signs ===
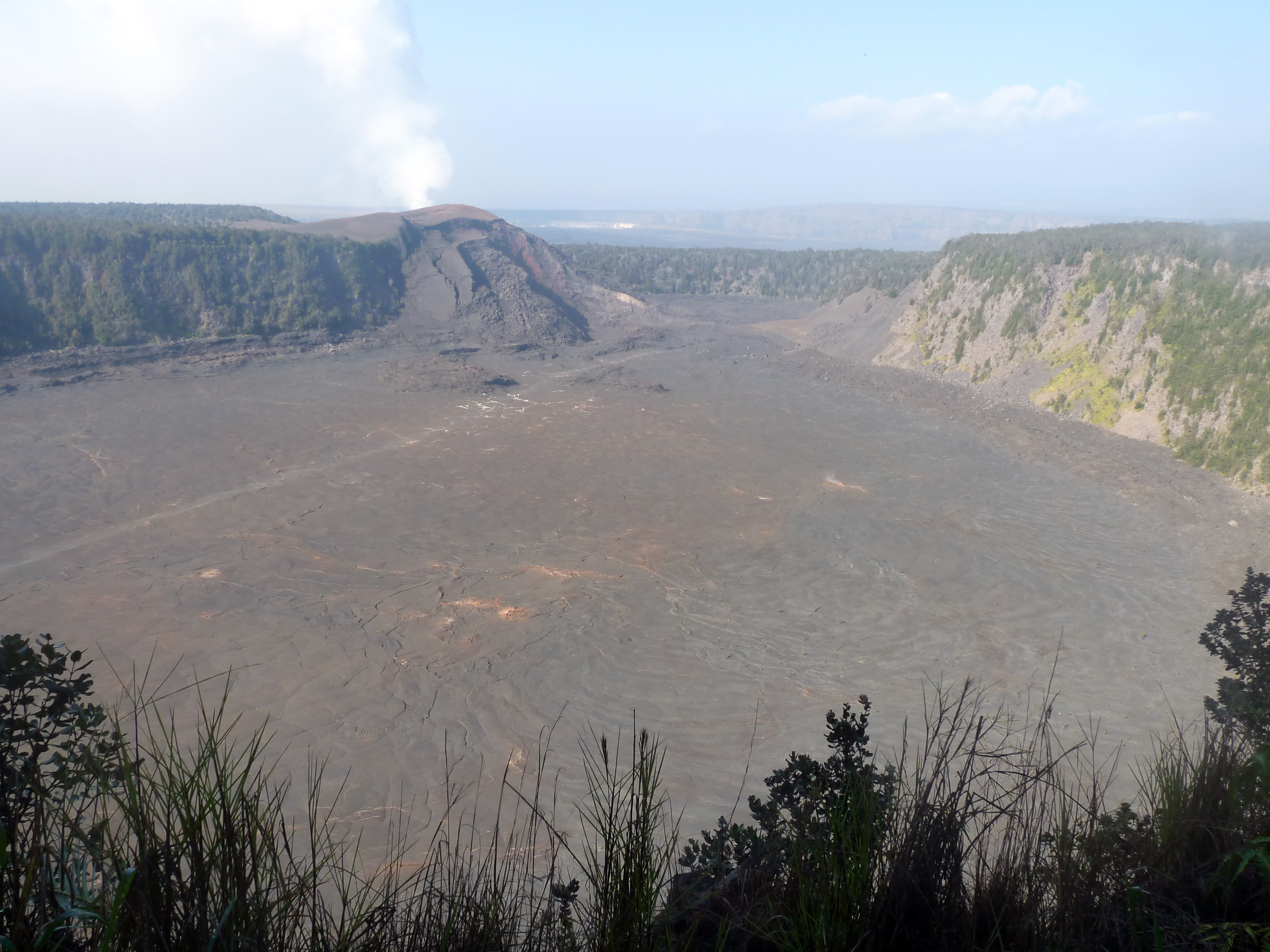
General view of Kīlauea Iki, site of the late 1959 eruption from which some of the lava from the 1960 eruption came.

The Volcanologists' fears were confirmed when a first seismic crisis appeared just after the end of the eruption of Kīlauea Iki on December 21, 1959, followed by a second in the first week of January 1960. The epicenters were located at Kapoho, a small community at the eastern end of Kīlauea's east rift, some forty kilometers east of the volcano's summit, just before Cape Kumukahi, the easternmost point on the island of Hawaii. With the installation of a new seismograph on January 12, over a thousand tremors were recorded during the day, at a maximum rate of one every ten seconds or so. These earthquakes gained in intensity the following day, just before 6 am, allowing residents to start feeling them. They triggered the replay of two parallel faults, the Kapoho fault passing just below the locality and the Koaʻe fault further north.

From 8 a.m. onwards, the movement of these faults is visible on the surface, with the formation of two escarpments with an amplitude of 1.2 meters for the Koaʻe fault and 1 meter for the Kapoho fault. They delimit a graben by the subsidence of the land between the two faults. With roads threatening to become impassable, the ground constantly vibrating and the rumblings that accompany the strongest earthquakes, the 300 inhabitants of Kapoho spontaneously left their village, which was completely evacuated by early evening. The subsidence of the ground and the sudden drop in the intensity of the earthquakes, some 1,500 still recorded in the afternoon of January 13, indicated to volcanologists the imminence of the eruption.

=== Fissure vents open ===
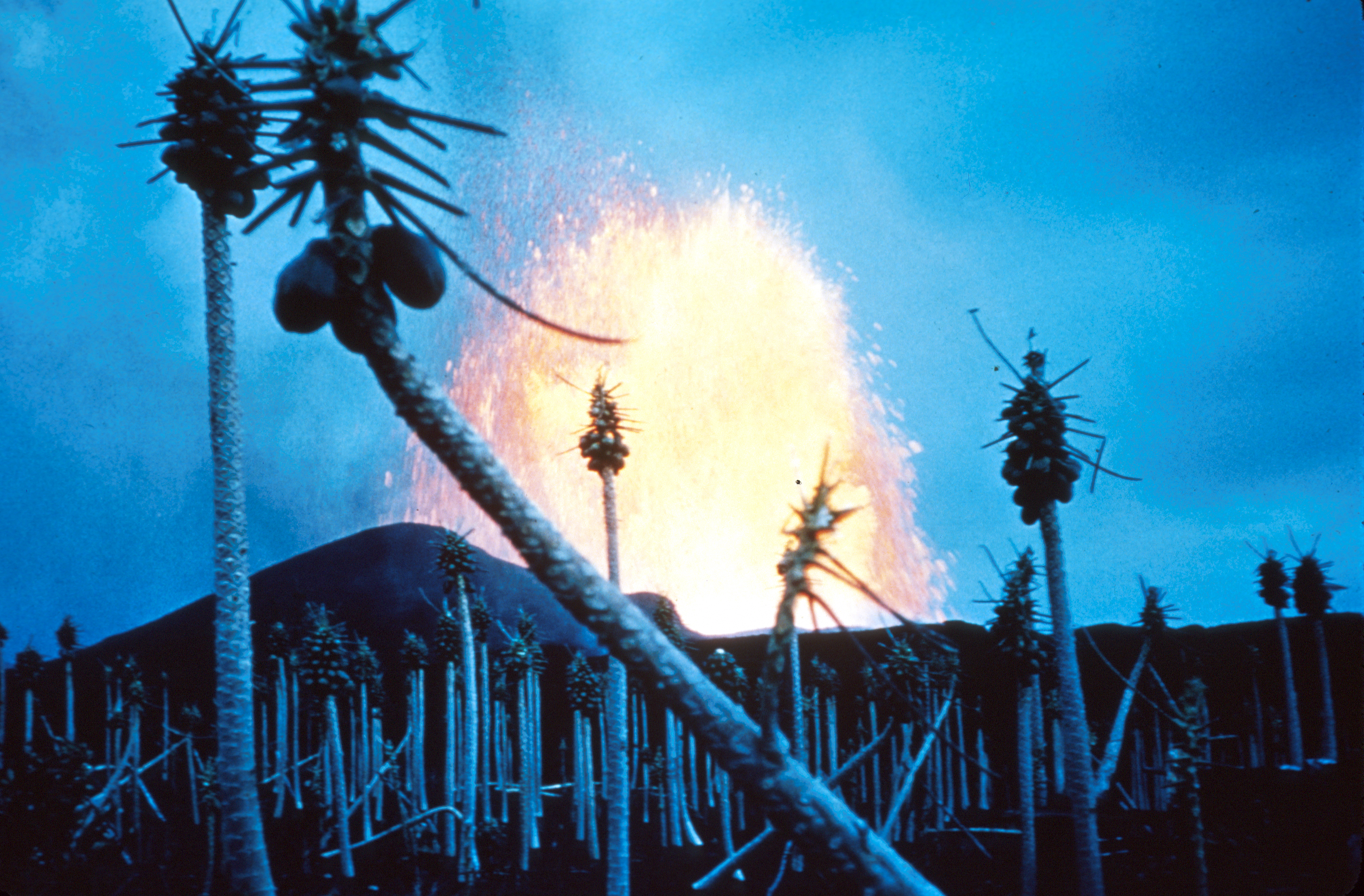
View of the lava fountain emerging from the volcanic cone, with papaya trees having lost their leaves at their feet.

At 7:35 p.m. on January 13, the reddening of the sky heralded the start of the eruption. Within thirty minutes, fissure vents 900 meters long opened up in the ground inside the graben, parallel to the two faults, 600 meters north-west of Kapoho, at an altitude of around thirty meters. Volcanic activity will cease after a few hours on the fissures at the ends, concentrating on four of them in the center. Fountains of lava a hundred meters high escape from these fissures, immediately forming a ʻaʻā lava flow heading northeast toward the ocean. It progresses through gently sloping terrain covered with dense vegetation, including coconut, papaya, orchid, and coffee plantations, which burns and causes explosions when the methane released by the decomposing vegetation ignites. At midnight, the coastal road was cut off by the lava.

In the evening, one of the fissures is shaken by explosions caused by the vaporization of groundwater of uncertain origin, either from the brackish water table or from seawater seeping into the faults. The plumes of water vapor expelled violently from the fissure over eleven hours are strewn with fragments of lava, both glowing and cooled, all amid a deafening noise resembling "a huge blowtorch or a giant steam engine". This particular mode of operation coexists with nearby lava fountains, which either discharge only lava without a powerful explosion or temporarily discharge a mixture of lava and steam. The surrounding area is then covered with a thin deposit of fine fragments of volcanic glass and salt crystals, expelled with the steam and carried away by the wind. When this phreato-magmatic activity ended around midday on January 14, only three fissures, totaling 200 meters in length, continued to emit lava. The fountains build small, ten-meter-high scoria cones around the eruptive vents, and the lava escaping through the northern opening continues to feed the 1.5-kilometer-long lava flow, 500 meters from the Pacific Ocean.

=== First advance into the ocean ===
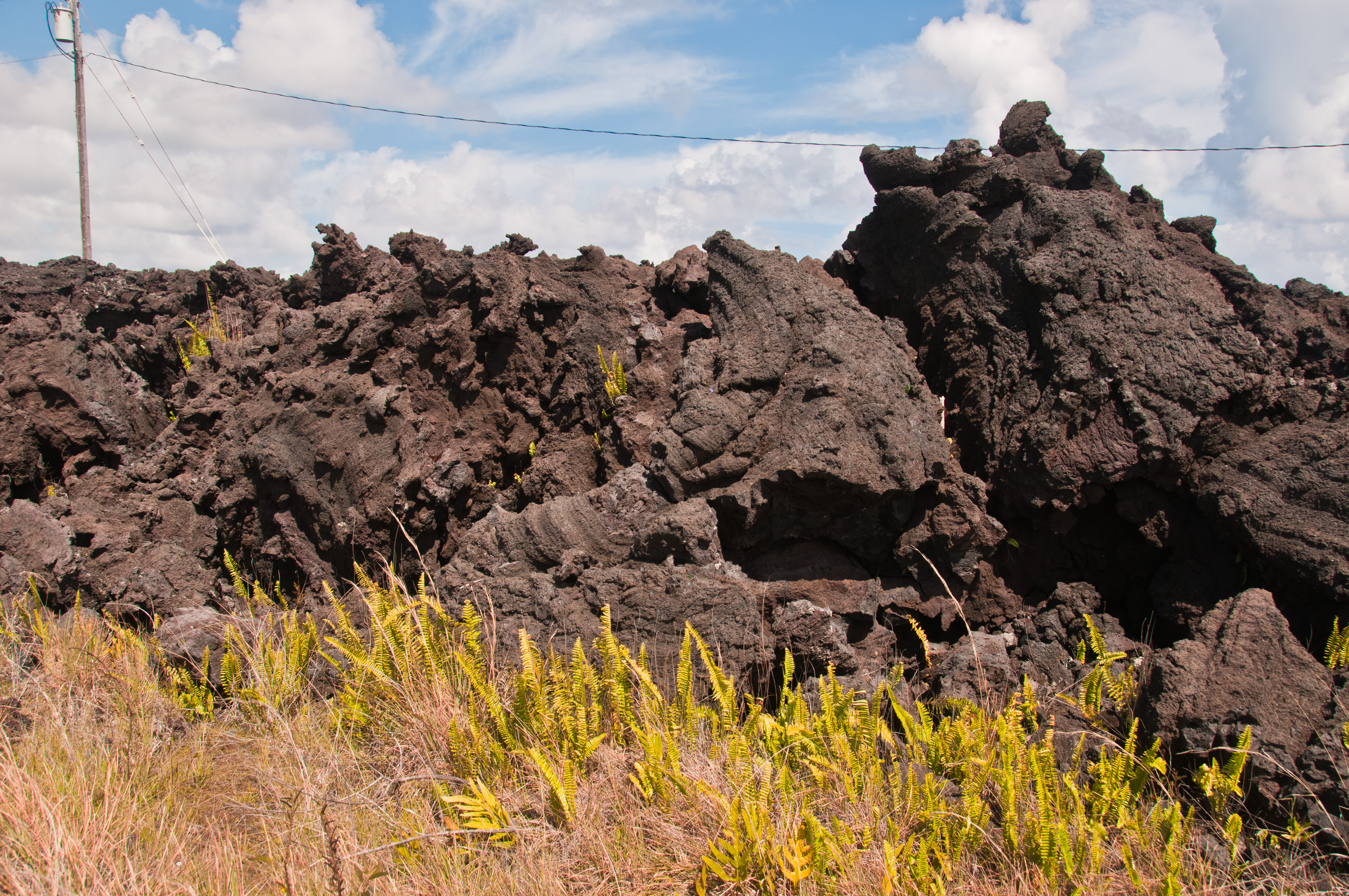
View of the lava flow in 2011.

After advancing 3.2 kilometers at an average speed of 88 mph and measuring 300 meters wide and 6 meters thick, the lava flow reached the Pacific Ocean northeast of the fountains, between Kaoko Point and Higashi Pond, on January 15 shortly after 8 am. The seawater, heated to 39 °C at 300 meters from the shore and above 28 °C at 500 meters, produced a large plume of water vapor that rose above the coast. The lava progressed both into the sea, up to 100 meters from the old coastline at 11 pm, and southwards towards Higashi Pond. This small body of water, linked to the ocean by a narrow channel, was formed by a previous subsidence of the graben during the eruption of Kīlauea in May 1924. After several hours of advancing and stagnating phases, the lava flow entered Higashi Pond at channel level on January 16 at around 7:45 pm, cutting it off from the ocean. Further south, a second front of lava flowed into Higashi Pond.

Further south, a second front of the flow broke away from the main flow and advanced eastwards. It collides with Puʻu Kukae, a small volcanic cone, and bypasses it to the north. In its path are the Warm Springs, hot springs that provide a place to relax and picnic, which the lava eventually reaches and fills around midnight on the night of January 17–18. This part of the flow, continuing its course, reached and advanced into Higashi Pond from the southwest, before the two lava fronts met and finally filled the pond, whose water had completely evaporated.

From January 16 onwards, the activity of the fissures changed, with only one of them discharging a significant fountain of lava. This increased in height from 125 meters on the night of January 15 to over 200 meters in the early hours of January 16, with peaks of 275, 320, 365, and 425 meters respectively on the morning of January 16, during the day on January 16, on the morning of January 17 and on January 18. The 100-meter-long volcanic cone continued to grow with the activity of the fountains, rising from 30 to 50 meters in height in one day to reach 72 meters on January 20.

=== Destruction of Kapoho ===
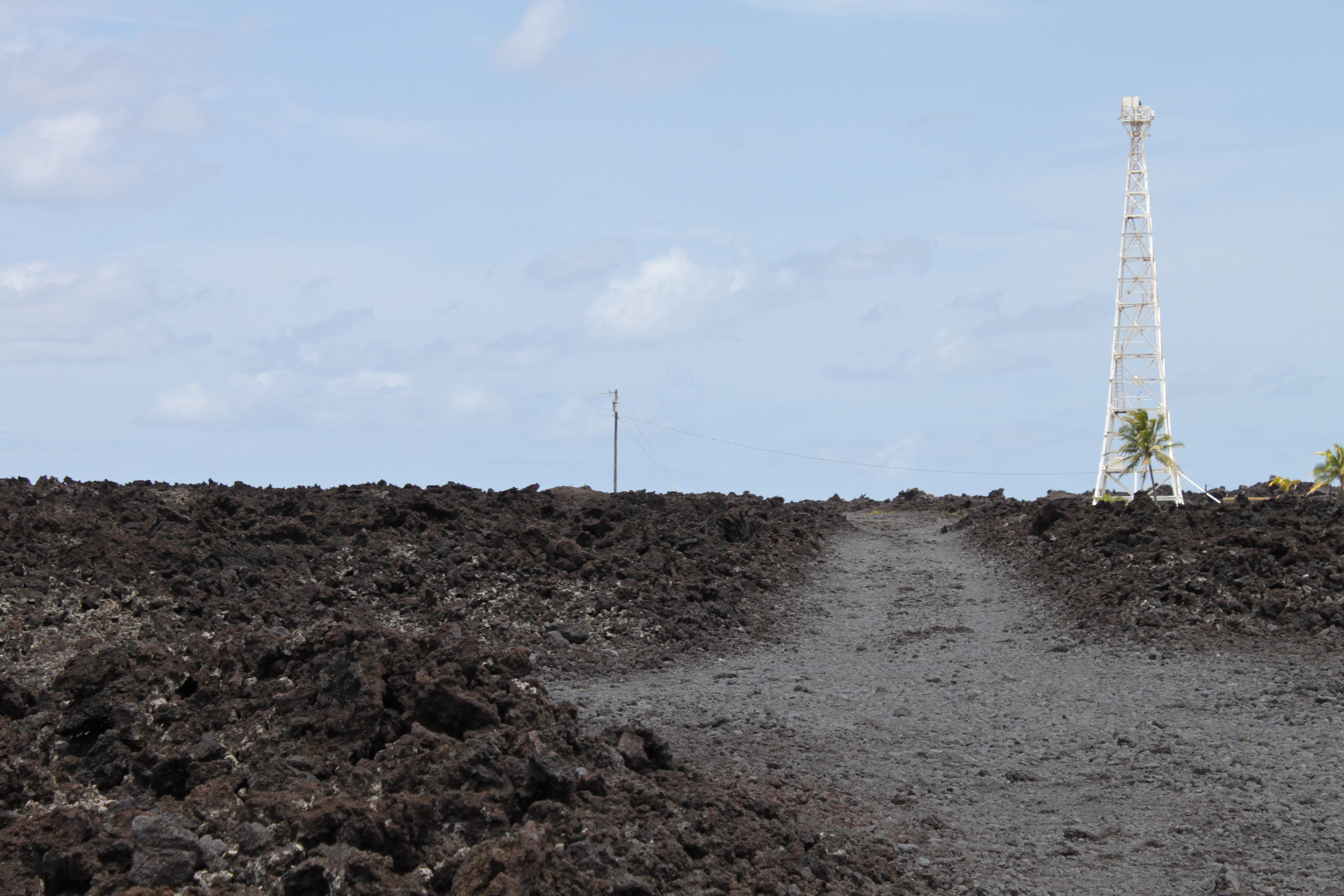
View of the Cape Kumukahi Light surrounded by lava in 2010.

As the lava advances, it threatens and then destroys infrastructure, the first being the coastal road in the early hours of the eruption, and landscapes such as Higashi Pond. The authorities therefore attempted to divert or stop the flow in certain places. A first attempt was made on January 17 to protect the Warm Springs, located at the foot of Puʻu Kukae, by building a dike 450 meters long and 1.5 to 3 meters high. However, this proved ineffective, as by 5 p.m. the lava began to flow over it, and by 8:30 p.m. it was completely submerged by the flow, which continued its course eastwards.

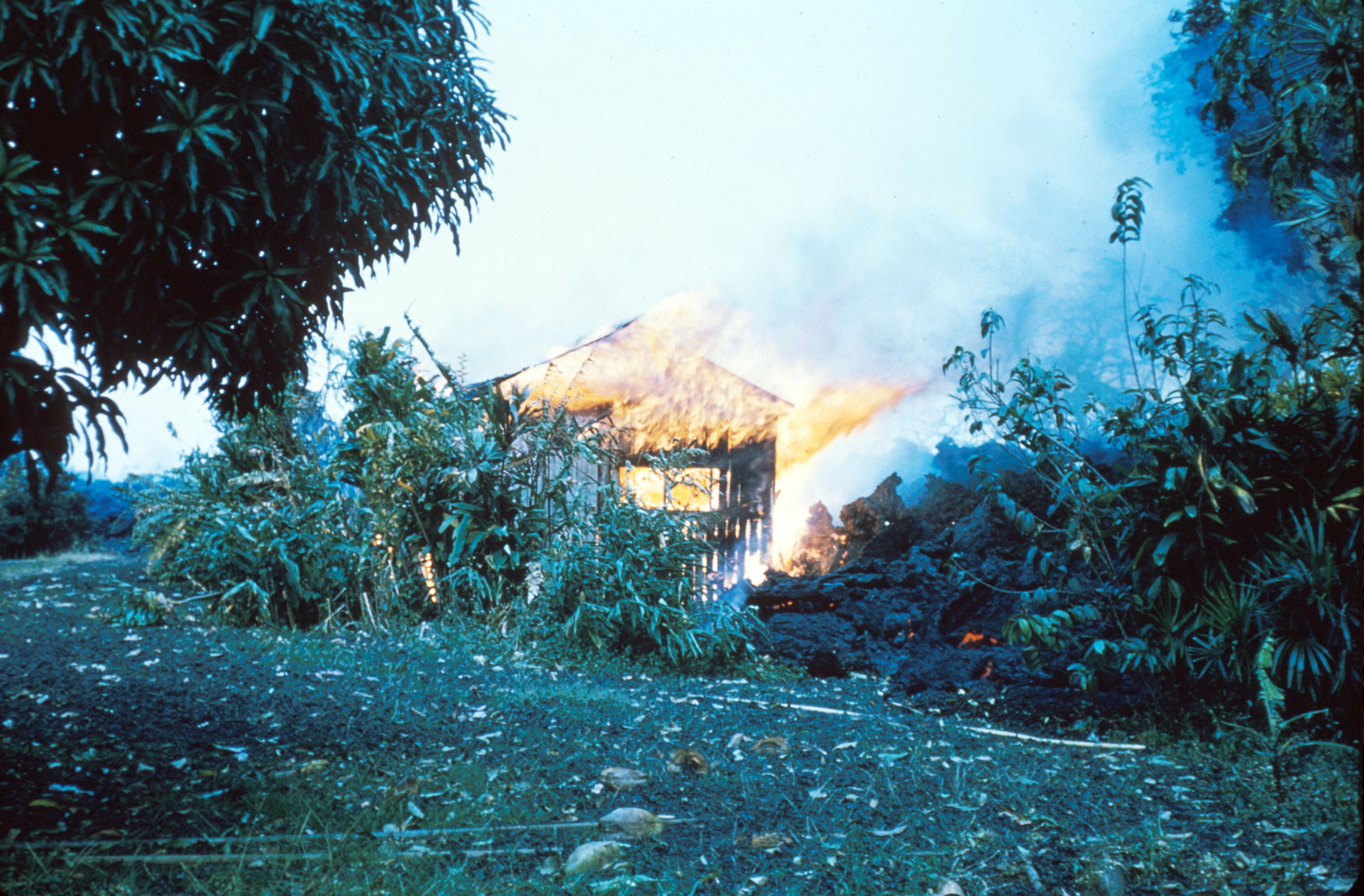
House in the hamlet of Koaʻe destroyed by the flow on January 23.

The next day, the lava threatened the town of Kapoho, which until then had been relatively unaffected by the eruption due to its slightly elevated location. The flow, which had reached the gates of the village, began to enter the town as a result of the collapse of the southern flank of the slag cone, which had discharged large quantities of lava in the direction of the houses. The lava front flowing into the Pacific Ocean also changed direction as it moved towards Cape Kumukahi, causing the flow to move southwards along its entire length. This threatened the homes and schools of Kapoho, as well as the Kapoho Beach district further south. An initial dike between Kapoho and the Puʻu Kukae volcanic cone was built between January 19 and 20. Measuring between 4.5 and 6 meters high, it was poorly located, rising between 6 and 12 meters below the natural threshold between Puʻu Kukae and the Kapoho crater. This dike was thus submerged by the six-meter-thick lava flow on January 23 at 3:30 pm. The same day, in the hamlet of Koaʻe to the north of Kapoho, on the other side of the flow, five buildings, including a church, were destroyed by the lava after several days of very slow advance. No dyke was built to stop the lava, which stopped advancing on January 28.

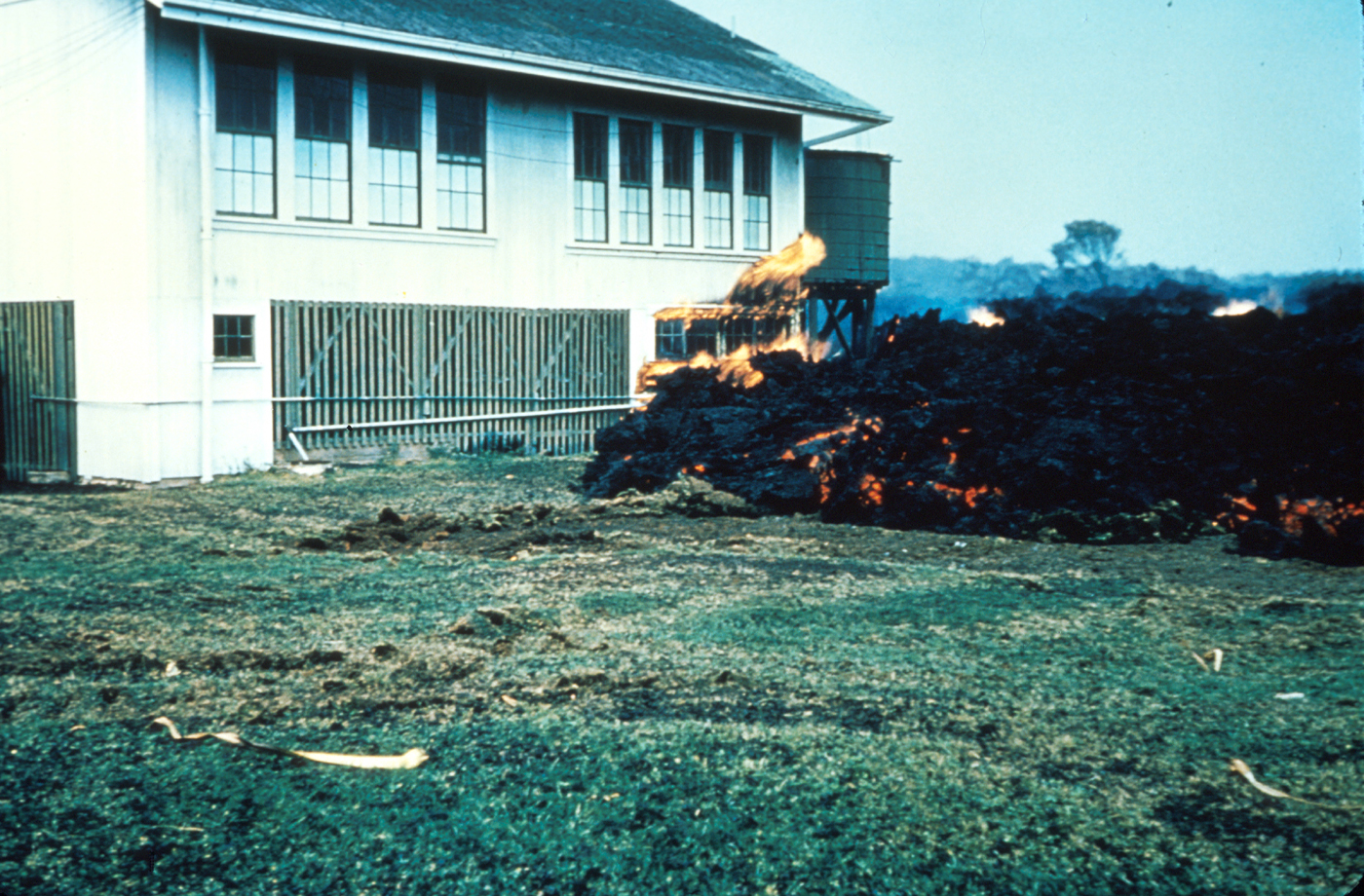
Kapoho school destroyed by the lava on January 28.

The first barrier to protect Kapoho proved ineffective but delayed the flow long enough for bulldozers to build a second dike, set back from the first, again between Puʻu Kukae and Kapoho crater. This "last chance" dike, built on January 23 and 24, was as ineffective as the first, being bypassed by the lava at 1:13 a.m. on January 27. The first houses were destroyed, consumed by the heat, and then crushed by the slowly advancing wall of lava. Extending behind the lava front, a vast field of liquid lava threatened to engulf the village at any moment, should the edge of the flow break. This catastrophic scenario will not occur but will be replaced by another when some of the fissures reactivate and spew ʻaʻā lava. The new flow quickly reached the gates of Kapoho and advanced into the town from the southwest, destroying every building in its path. At midnight on January 27, and after just thirty minutes, most of Kapoho was destroyed. The last two buildings still standing were swallowed up on January 30 in a final advance of the lava.

Despite Kapoho's destruction, a third dike, also described as a "last chance", was built again, set back from the first two, again between Kapoho crater and Puʻu Kukae. At least five meters high over its 450-meter length, it is the last chance to protect the school and cemetery just behind. At 4 a.m. on January 28, the lava came up against the dike and built up to a thickness of fifteen meters. The pressure exerted against the dike and the Puʻu Kukae caused the lava to seep into the volcanic cone of loosely consolidated ash. A 150-meter-long fragment was torn from the cone and floated to the surface of the flow, ten meters above its original position. Managing to pass under the dike and emerge on the other side, the lava continued its progression south-eastwards, reaching the school, which was destroyed between 10 a.m. and 12.30 pm, and the cemetery. Finally, the dike was submerged by the lava on February 5.

=== Cape Kumukahi and Kapoho Beach ===
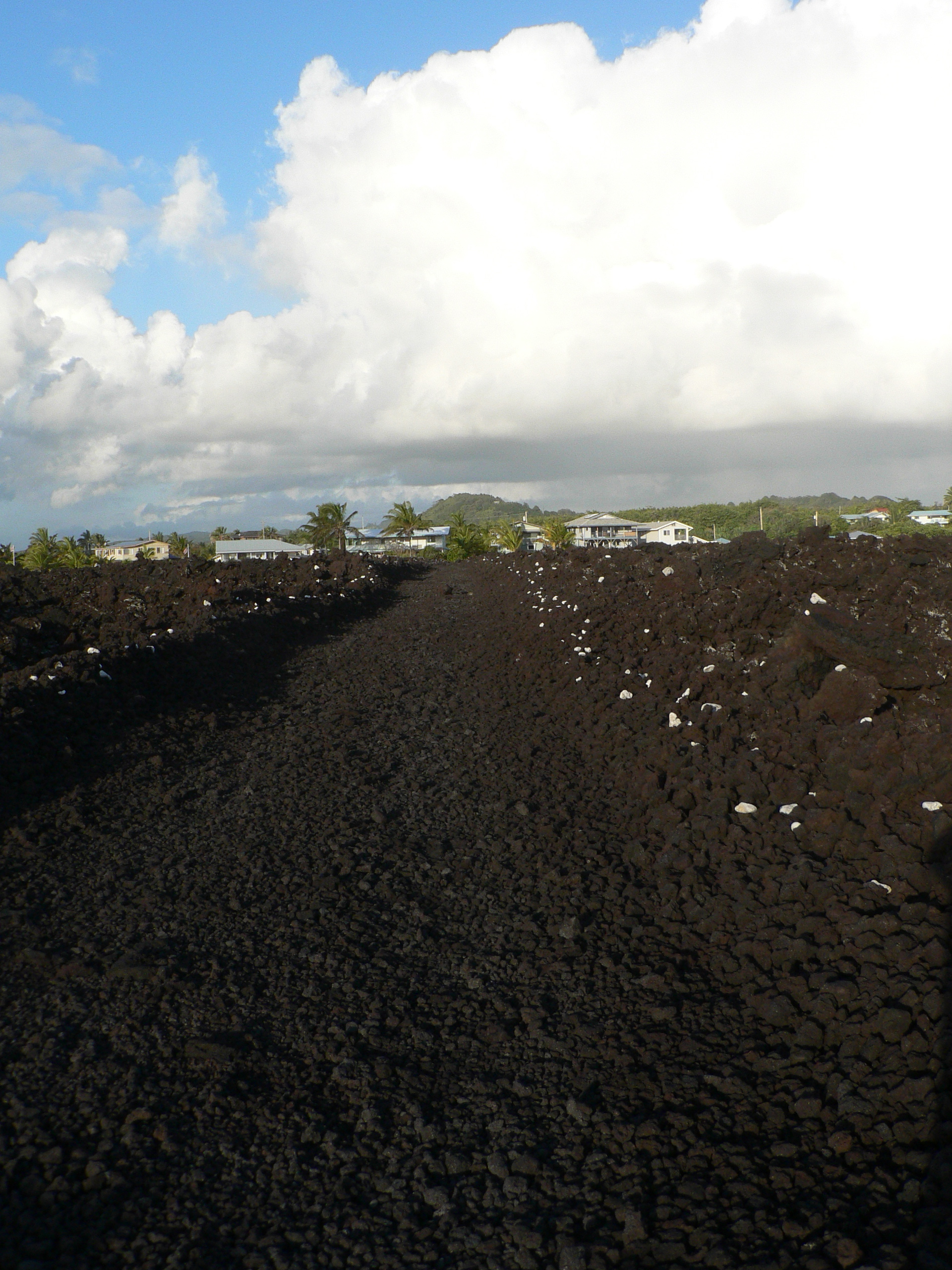
View of the lava flow in 2010, through which a track leading to Kapoho Beach has been built.

At the same time as the fight against the advancing lava was being organized to protect Kapoho, another dike was built from January 21, on the other side of Puʻu Kukae, between this volcanic cone and the Pacific Ocean, along a faint ridge. With a length of 1.6 kilometers, it was intended to spare the Kapoho Beach district and the coastguard installations at Cape Kumukahi, including the lighthouse, from destruction.

This levee also proved ineffective, however, as the lava opened four breaches on January 28, and the next day was submerged along most of its length. The lava also bypassed the barrier, advancing into the ocean to the north, branching off to the south, and stopping before reaching the lighthouse. The lighthouse is surrounded by lava, which advances out to sea, pushing Cape Kumukahi further east. Once past the dike obstacle, the lava flows rapidly southwards. Progressing both on land and out to sea, it reached Kapoho Beach on February 2, destroying six houses before stopping on February 5.

=== End of the eruption ===
From January 27 and especially from the 30 onwards, the temperature of the lava rose from 20 to 50 °C and its mineralogical composition changed, with a sharp rise in olivine content, leading to the formation of two narrower, higher lava fountains. On the day of Kapoho's destruction, January 27, a slag heap a kilometer long and several dozen meters thick was formed in a northeasterly direction when large quantities of tephra were discharged from the main fountain and covered the lava lake. This behavior change is interpreted as the arrival on the surface of magma from the Kīlauea magma chamber, mixed with that present beneath Kapoho since at least 1955. This exogenous magma is thought to have originated from the 12 × 106 cubic meters remnant of the late 1959 eruption of Kīlauea Iki, which made its way under the east rift to Kapoho. This new lava headed northeast and continued to advance into the Pacific Ocean just north of Cape Kumukahi until February 13.

After a final burst in which the fountains reached a height of 300 meters, they gradually dried up and stopped spewing lava on February 19, marking the end of the eruption. The highest volcanic cone, rising more than a hundred meters above the surrounding terrain, is named Puʻu Laimana in honor of the Lyman family who owned the land where the fissures opened.

=== The summit of Kīlauea ===
While the most visible manifestations of the eruption were at Kapoho, the summit of Kīlauea was also affected by the eruption. From January 17, the volcano's summit began to deflate, indicating the emptying of the magma chamber via the fissures opened at Kapoho. This deflation, the largest recorded on Kīlauea at the time, continued once the eruption was over until July 1960. It was accompanied by small earthquakes from January 23 onwards, up to several hundred a day, caused by fracturing of the rock surrounding the magma chamber due to changes in pressure stress.

On the surface, deflation and earthquakes result in the enlargement of old fissures, the opening of new ones, and rockfalls on the Halemaʻumaʻu walls. The most significant development was the appearance of a sixty-meter-diameter ring of fumaroles at the bottom of the crater on February 5. This formation is not new, since such fumaroles had already appeared in the same spot during the eruption of May 1924, just before the crater collapsed and exploded. On the night of February 6–7, such a collapse began with the slow but steady subsidence of the crater floor, accompanied by muffled rumbling. In the early hours of the morning, a six- to nine-meter-deep depression formed on the cracked surface from which streams of liquid lava escaped, the unsolidified remnants of the 90-meter-deep lava lake formed in 1952 and isolated from the surface by more recent lava. As it reached a depth of thirty meters, the collapse suddenly accelerated at 11:51. Within nine minutes, the depression was 300 meters in diameter and 90 meters deep. A circular fissure opened in the upper part of the rim, releasing large quantities of lava from the 1952 eruption. Until February 11, this lava accumulated at the bottom of the depression, forming a lava lake twenty meters deep.

On February 9, a second depression formed in around ten minutes to the southwest of the first, but no lava was emitted. On February 12, a powerful earthquake struck Kīlauea. Numerous fissures open up a few kilometers south of Halemaʻumaʻu, one of them forming a small, fifteen-centimeter-high escarpment across the Hilina Pali road. Another powerful tremor occurred on March 7, causing some damage to the Volcano and buildings in Hawaii Volcanoes National Park. On March 11, a third collapse occurred at the bottom of the Halemaʻumaʻu crater, accompanied by a lava outcrop. A depression 120 meters long, 90 meters wide, and 30 meters deep forms in 25 minutes to the northeast of the first two, at the foot of the crater wall. These collapses in the Halemaʻumaʻu will represent a total volume of 22 × 106 cubic meters, or half the volume of lava emitted during the 1952 eruption that formed the lava lake, but they will not be followed by any further manifestations, unlike the 1924 eruption.

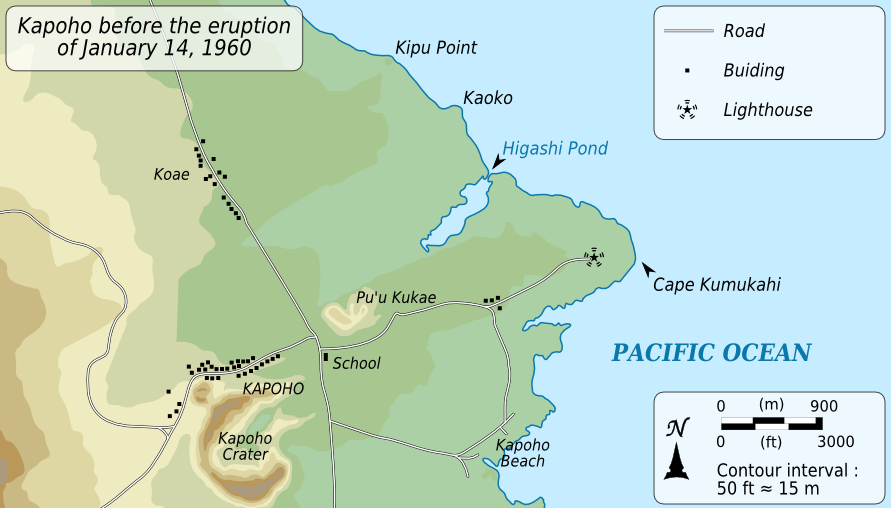
Maps of lava flow progress, dike construction and destruction.

== Consequences ==
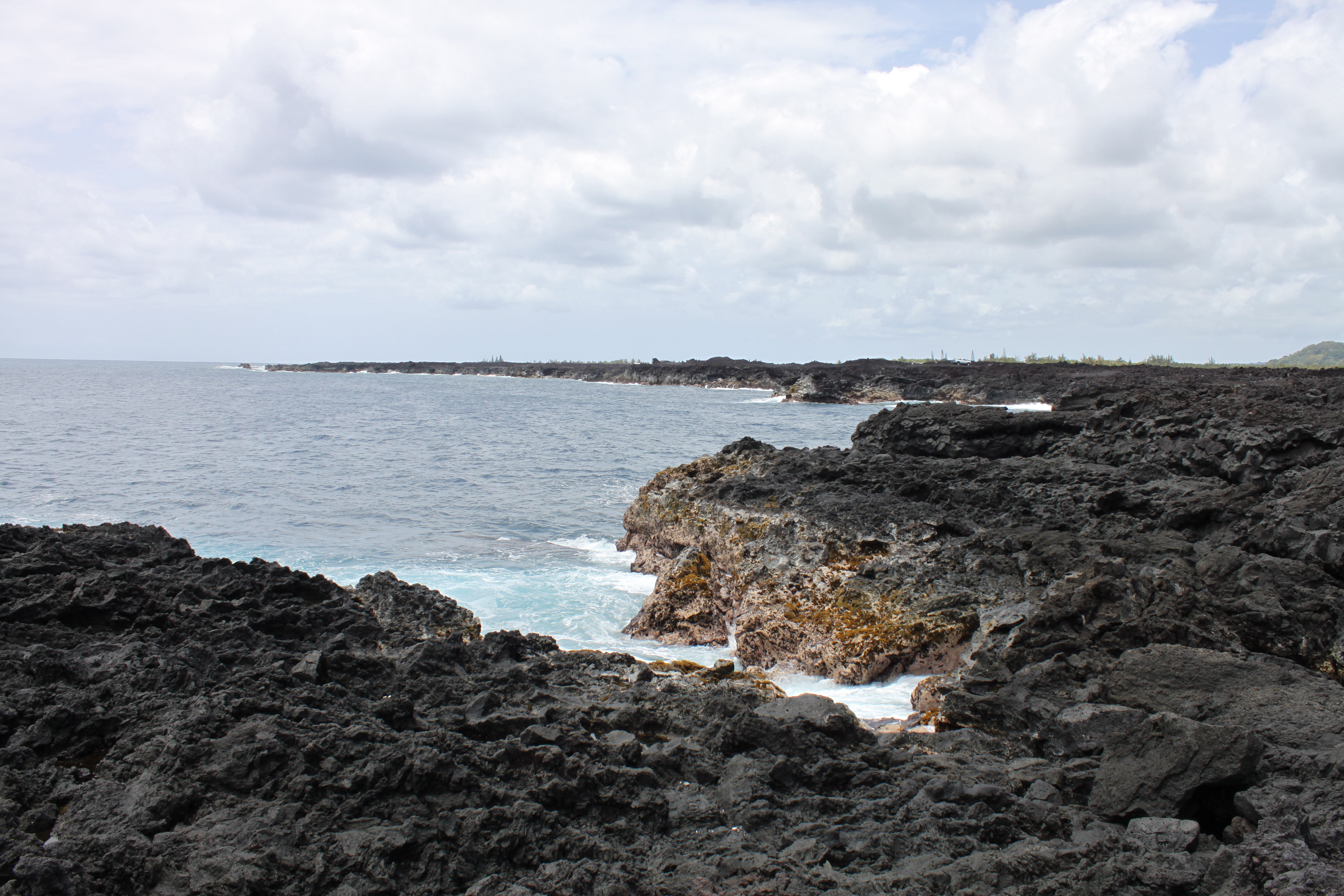
View of Cape Kumukahi in 2010, Hawaii's most easterly point.

When the eruption ended on February 19, the 122 × 106 cubic meters of lava and the 7.5 × 106 cubic meters of tephra released covered an area of over 10 square kilometers, including 2 square kilometers of new land reclaimed from the sea, bringing its volcanic explosivity index to 2. These figures make this the third most powerful eruption in Kīlauea in the 20th century, after the later eruptions of Mauna Ulu from 1969 to 1974 and Puʻu ʻŌʻō from 1983.

A community of 300 inhabitants, a school, churches, roads, and crops were destroyed and covered by several meters of lava that advanced out to sea, modifying the coastline by bringing Cape Kumukahi, Hawaii's easternmost point, a little further east. After the lava had cooled, Kapoho was not rebuilt, except a few buildings southwest of the site of the former settlement, next to the lava flow. The roads have been retraced, with the coastal road crossing the lava flow from one end to the other and the road to the Cape Kumukahi lighthouse via Kapoho following the old route. Part of the lava flow, notably the mass of tephra formed on January 27, has since been exploited as a slag quarry not far from Koaʻe.

== See also ==
- Kīlauea Iki
- Kapoho, Hawaii
