= Hawaii Route 130 =

State highway in Hawaii, United States

Hawaii Route 130
- Route 130 highlighted in red

Route information
- Maintained by HDOT
- Length: 21.639 mi (34.825 km)

Major junctions
- South end: Kaimu–Chain of Craters Road near Kaimū
- North end: Route 11 in Keaau

Location
- Country: United States
- State: Hawaii
- Counties: Hawaii

Highway system
- Routes in Hawaii
| ← Route 99 | → Route 132 |

Route 130, also known as Keaʻau–Pāhoa Road and Pāhoa–Kalapana Road is a state highway in Hawaii County, Hawaii, United States. It runs from Route 11 at Keaʻau through the Puna District to Kalapana.

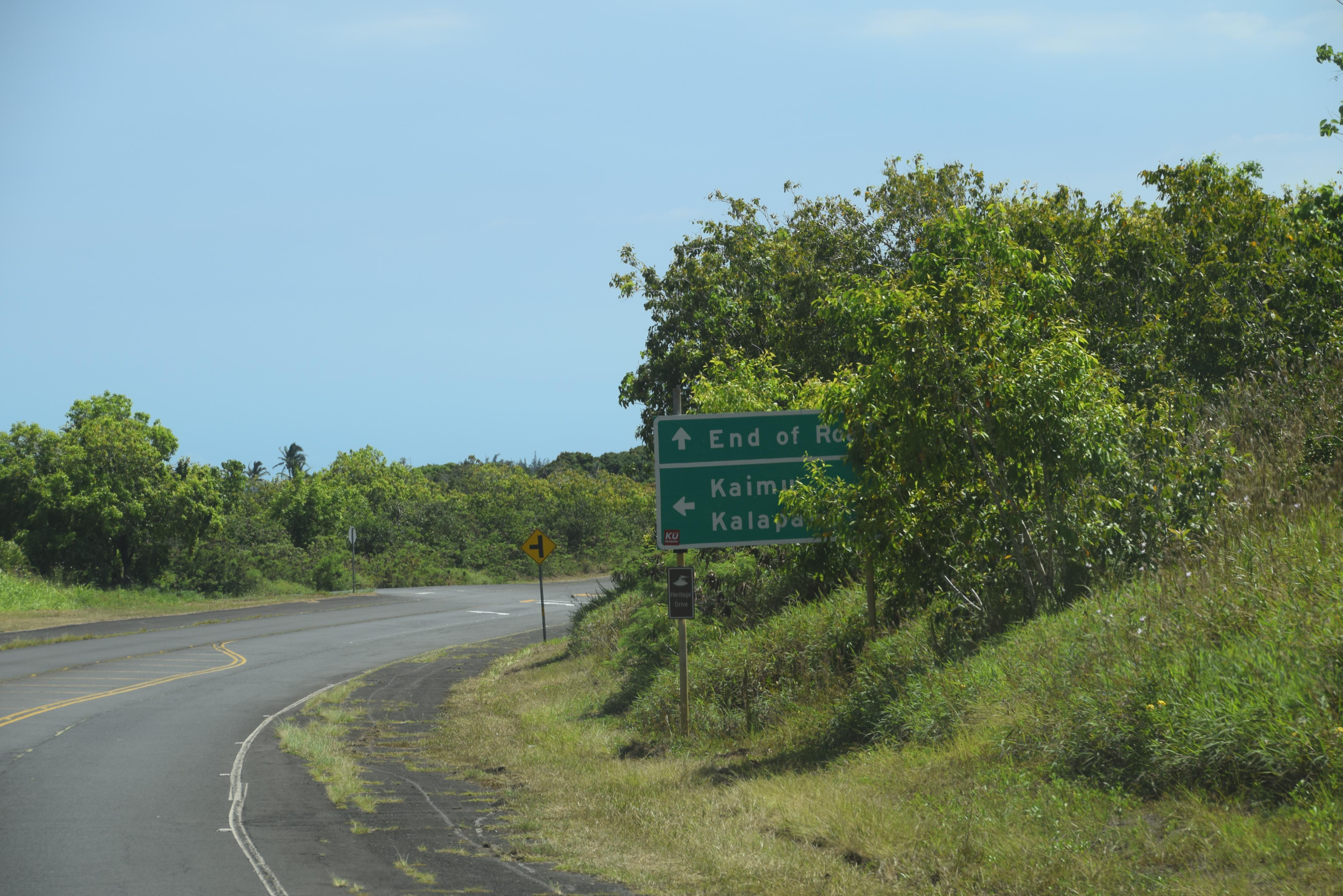
Route 130 at Route 137

== Route description ==
Route 130 starts from the intersection of Keaʻau on Route 11, in the south of Hilo. After a junction with It heads south on the east side of Kīlauea to Pāhoa, where Route 132 branches out via Kapoho to Cape Kumukahi with further connection to Route 137, and curves toward the west, ending near Kaimū following a junction with Route 137 itself.

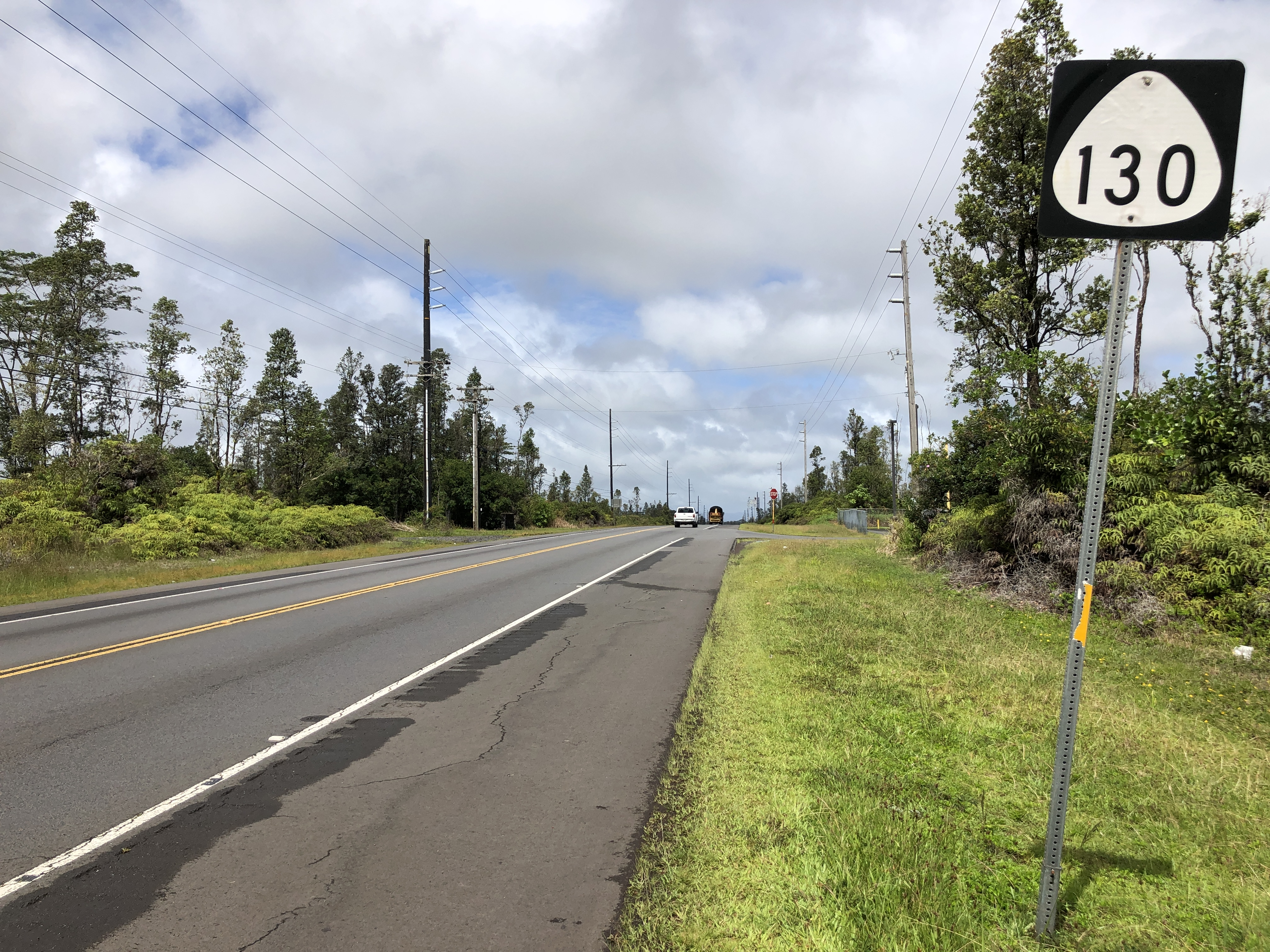
Route 130 northbound in Pāhoa

== History ==
Route 130 used to travel further to the west along the Chain of Craters Road in Hawaii Volcanoes National Park. However, it was truncated to its current terminus due to the lava flows from Puʻu ʻŌʻō Crater that started in 1983 and buried sections of Kaimū and Kalapana.

== Major intersections ==
The entire route is in Hawaii County.

| Location | mi | km | Destinations | Notes |
|---|---|---|---|---|
| | 0.0 | 0.0 | Kaimu–Chain of Craters Road | Southern terminus; road becomes private |
| | 0.8 | 1.3 | Route 137 – Kaimū, Kalapana | Access via Pahoa–Kalapana Road |
| Pahoa | 9.7 | 15.6 | Route 132 (Pahoa–Kapoho Road) – Kapoho | Western terminus of HI 132 |
| Keaau | 21.6 | 34.8 | Route 11 – Hilo, Volcano | Northern terminus |
1.000 mi = 1.609 km; 1.000 km = 0.621 mi
