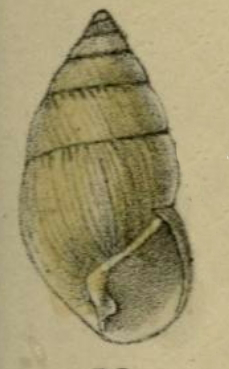
- Shell of Amastra subcornea (holotype)

Scientific classification
- Kingdom: Animalia
- Phylum: Mollusca
- Class: Gastropoda
- Order: Stylommatophora
- Family: Amastridae
- Genus: Amastra
- Species: A. subcornea

Binomial name
- Amastra subcornea Hyatt & Pilsbry, 1911

Synonyms
- Amastra (Metamastra) subcornea Hyatt & Pilsbry, 1911 alternative representation

= Amastra subcornea =

Species of mollusc

Amastra subcornea is a species of air-breathing land snail, a terrestrial pulmonate gastropod mollusc in the family Amastridae.

== Description ==
The length of the shell attains 12.5 mm, its diameter 6.3 mm.

(Original description) The shell contains 6 1/2 whorls. This subfossil shell is smaller than Amastra cornea but exhibits a similarly attenuated and biconcave outline near the apex. Its overall appearance resembles that of Leptachatina A. Gould, 1847, particularly due to the rapid expansion of the last three whorls. However, the apex lacks the blunt appearance typical of Leptachatina and does not exhibit the disproportionate growth rates between the nepionic and neanic stages observed in that genus.

The aperture is narrow, resulting from the contraction of the body whorl. The columella is perforated, though the opening is relatively small and nearly sealed in some specimens. The shell surface features prominent growth ridges, while the nepionic stage displays finer, transverse ridges.

The shell's characteristics are intermediate between those of † Amastra cornea (Newcomb, 1854) and the more primitive shells of the *Brevis* series found on the island of Oahu. This strongly suggests that it represents a transitional species, bridging the evolutionary gap between these groups.

== Distribution ==
This species is endemic to Hawaii, occurring on Oahu Island.
