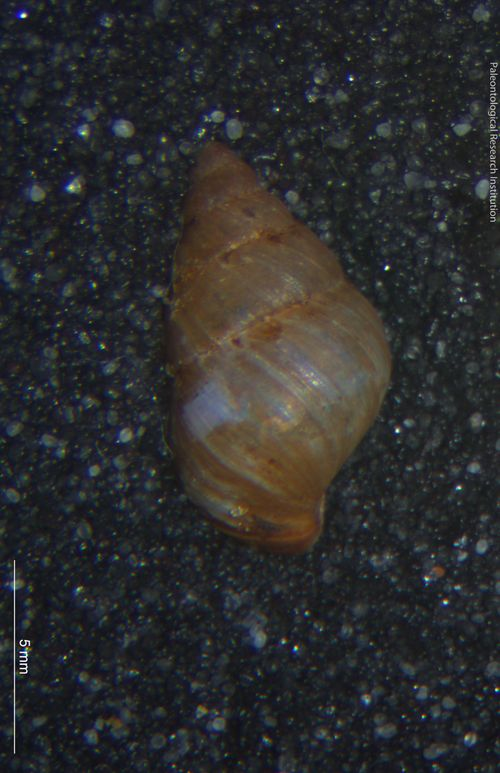

Conservation status
- Extinct (IUCN 2.3)

- Possibly Extinct (NatureServe)

Scientific classification
- Kingdom: Animalia
- Phylum: Mollusca
- Class: Gastropoda
- Order: Stylommatophora
- Family: Amastridae
- Genus: Amastra
- Species: †A. cornea

Binomial name
- †Amastra cornea (Newcomb, 1854)
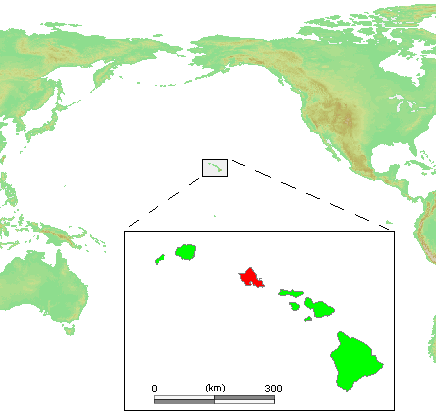
- Location of Oʻahu

Synonyms
- Achatinella cornea Newcomb, 1854 superseded combination; Amastra (Metamastra) cornea (Newcomb, 1854) alternative representation

= Amastra cornea =

Species of gastropod

Amastra cornea was a species of air-breathing land snails, terrestrial pulmonate gastropod mollusks in the family Amastridae.

== Description ==
(Original description) The shell is irregularly acutely conical with a pointed apex and an inflated body whorl. It is thin and corneous, adorned with minute longitudinal striations. Comprising seven rounded whorls, the shell features a subovate aperture with a thin, translucent lip. The columella is straight, white, and equipped with a transverse, plaited tooth.

The shell's coloration is a uniform dark horn, contrasting with the white columella and tooth.

== Distribution ==
This extinct species was endemic to Oʻahu, and was known from around Waialua.
