= Cape Kumukahi =

Easternmost point of the Big Island of Hawaii

Coordinates: 19°31′00″N 154°48′30″W

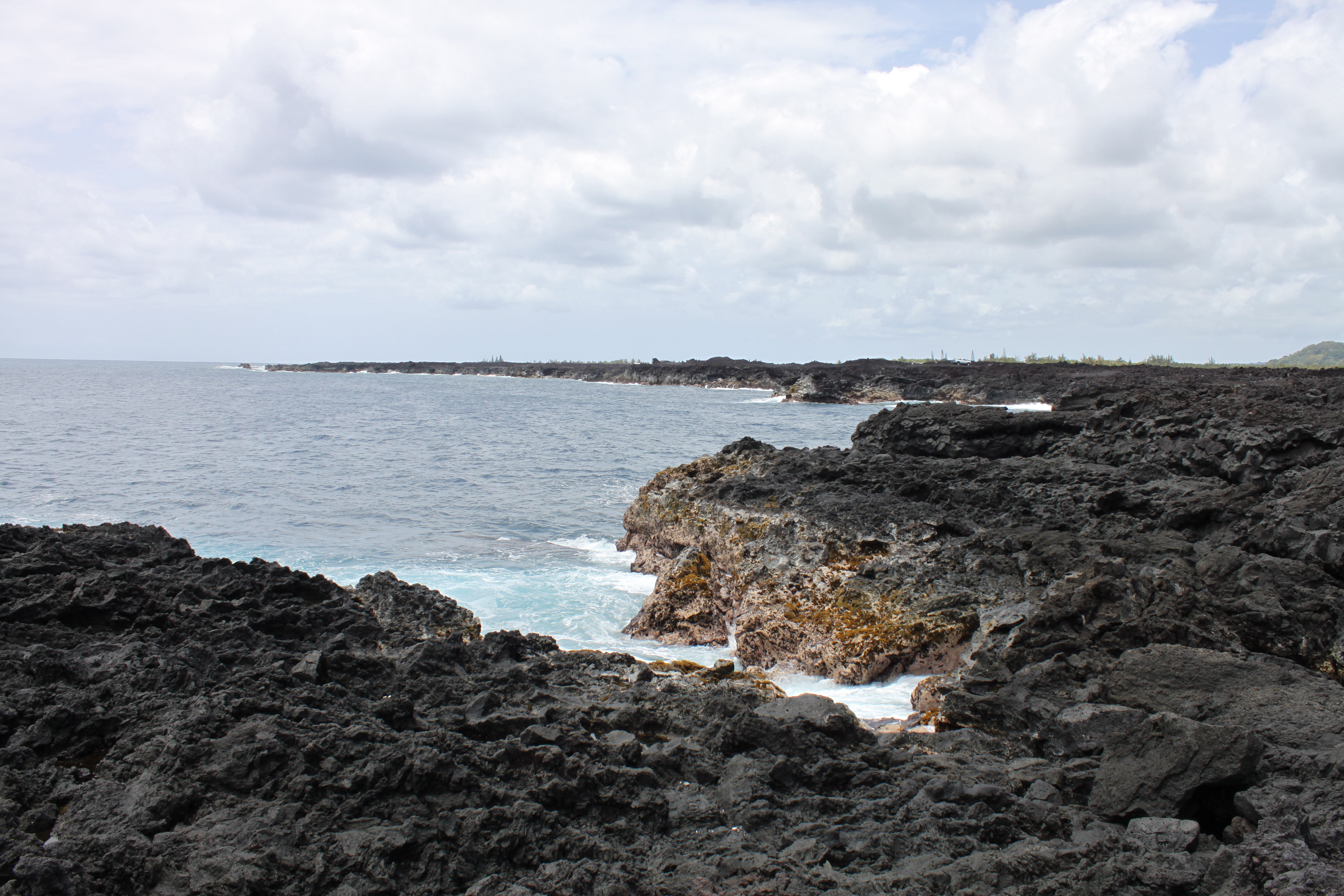
View of Cape Kumukahi

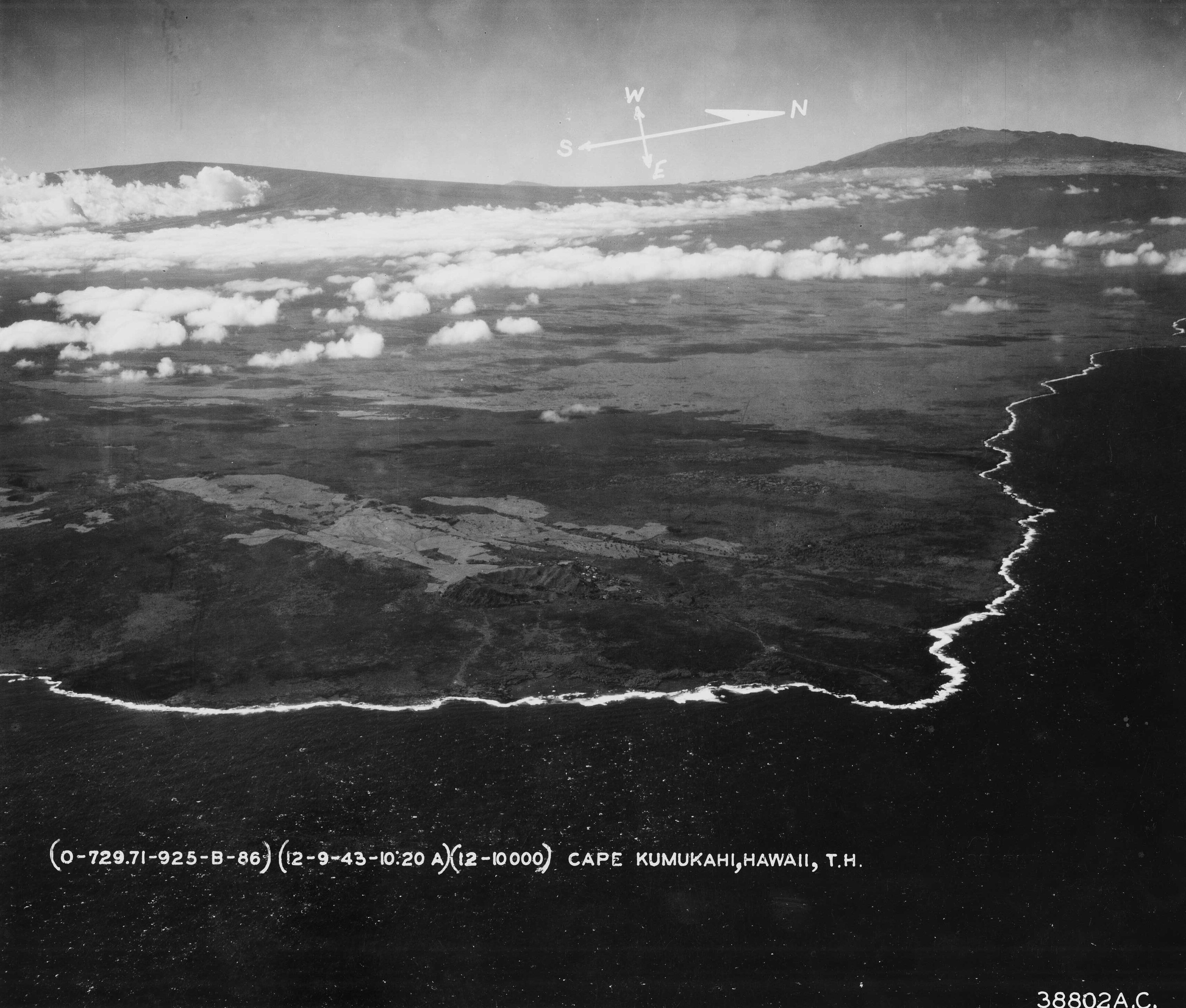
Cape Kumukahi, December 1943

Cape Kumukahi is the easternmost point of the Big Island of Hawaii. It constitutes the eastern end of the East Rift Zone of Kīlauea which is prolonged under the sea beyond the course via the edge of Puna.

Cape Kumukahi Light is located in the cape.
