= Waialua, Hawaii =

Census-designated place in Hawaii, United States

Waialua
- Census-designated place
- Location in Honolulu County and the state of Hawaii
- Coordinates: 21°34′31″N 158°7′46″W
- Country: United States
- State: Hawaii

Area
  - Total: 2.39 sq mi (6.19 km^{2})
  - Land: 2.19 sq mi (5.68 km^{2})
  - Water: 0.20 sq mi (0.51 km^{2})
- Elevation: 13 ft (4 m)

Population (2020)
  - Total: 4,062
  - Density: 1,853.8/sq mi (715.75/km^{2})
- Time zone: UTC-10 (Hawaii-Aleutian)
- ZIP code: 96791
- Area code: 808
- FIPS code: 15-74000
- GNIS feature ID: 0364543

Waialua (Hawaiian pronunciation: [vɐjəˈluwə]) is a census-designated place and North Shore community in the Waialua District on the island of Oʻahu, City & County of Honolulu, Hawaii, United States. As of the 2020 census, the CDP had a population of 4,062.

Waialua was one of the six original districts of ancient Hawaii on the island, known as moku. Waialua is a former (sugar) mill town and residential area, quite different in its quiet ambiance from nearby Haleʻiwa, which is more commercial and tourist-oriented. The Waialua Sugar Mill is the center of town and the historical base of its plantation history.

The U.S. postal code for Waialua is 96791.

== Geography ==
Waialua is located at 21°34'31" north, 158°7'46" west (21.575300, -158.129457), southwest of Haleʻiwa, reached on Waialua Beach Road (State Rte. 82) or Kaukonahua Road (State Rte. 830). Kaukonahua Road turns eastward and, as State Rte. 803 then 801, runs up into the central plateau of Oʻahu to Wahiawā or (as 803) to Schofield Barracks. Farrington Highway (State Rte. 930) runs westward to Mokulēʻia.

According to the United States Census Bureau, the CDP has an area of 2.4 square miles (6.2 km^{2}), of which 2.2 square miles (5.7 km^{2}) is land and 0.19 square miles (0.5 km^{2}) is water. The total area is 8.30% water.

== Demographics ==
Historical population
Census	Pop.	Note	%±
2020	4,062		—
U.S. Decennial Census

=== 2020 census ===
As of the 2020 census, Waialua had a population of 4,062. The median age was 40.0 years. 22.0% of residents were under the age of 18 and 18.7% of residents were 65 years of age or older. For every 100 females there were 101.5 males, and for every 100 females age 18 and over there were 100.8 males age 18 and over.

86.5% of residents lived in urban areas, while 13.5% lived in rural areas.

There were 1,254 households in Waialua, of which 34.8% had children under the age of 18 living in them. Of all households, 48.9% were married-couple households, 22.0% were households with a male householder and no spouse or partner present, and 21.7% were households with a female householder and no spouse or partner present. About 20.2% of all households were made up of individuals and 7.7% had someone living alone who was 65 years of age or older.

There were 1,383 housing units, of which 9.3% were vacant. The homeowner vacancy rate was 1.1% and the rental vacancy rate was 3.9%.

Racial composition as of the 2020 census
Race	Number	Percent
White	1,110	27.3%
Black or African American	13	0.3%
American Indian and Alaska Native	4	0.1%
Asian	1,447	35.6%
Native Hawaiian and Other Pacific Islander	207	5.1%
Some other race	42	1.0%
Two or more races	1,239	30.5%
Hispanic or Latino (of any race)	458	11.3%

=== 2000 census ===
As of the census of 2000, there were 3,761 people, 1,128 households, and 882 families residing in the CDP. The population density was 3,007.6 inhabitants per square mile (1,161.2/km^{2}). There were 1,219 housing units at an average density of 974.8 per square mile (376.4/km^{2}). The racial makeup of the CDP was 15.34% White, 0.37% Black or African American, 0.05% Native American, 51.85% Asian, 3.96% Pacific Islander, 1.04% from other races, and 27.39% from two or more races. 6.54% of the population were Hispanic or Latino of any race.

There were 1,128 households, out of which 29.3% had children under the age of 18 living with them, 55.4% were married couples living together, 14.5% had a female householder with no husband present, and 21.8% were non-families. 17.5% of all households were made up of individuals, and 8.3% had someone living alone who was 65 years of age or older. The average household size was 3.31 and the average family size was 3.71.

In the CDP the population was spread out, with 23.9% under the age of 18, 7.7% from 18 to 24, 26.4% from 25 to 44, 23.1% from 45 to 64, and 18.9% who were 65 years of age or older. The median age was 39 years. For every 100 females there were 104.3 males. For every 100 females age 18 and over, there were 101.3 males.

The median income for a household in the CDP was $46,763, and the median income for a family was $51,801. Males had a median income of $29,607 versus $23,716 for females. The per capita income for the CDP was $17,220. 11.7% of the population and 8.9% of families were below the poverty line. Out of the total population, 15.0% of those under 18 and 9.0% of those 65 and older were living below the poverty line.

== Government and infrastructure ==
The United States Postal Service operates the Waialua Post Office at 67-079 Nauahi Street. The postal code is 96791.

In 2017, the state approved NRG Energy, Inc., to build a 49-megawatt solar farm project near Waialua called Kawailoa Solar. HECO will buy electricity from this solar farm at 11 cents per kilowatt-hour (kWh) for 22 years. On September 10, 2019, Kawailoa Solar began operation. Originally started by the developer SunEdison, Hawaiian Electric broke its ties to the firm in February 2016 before SunEdison's bankruptcy proceedings. San Francisco-based Clearway's predecessor, NRG Energy's Community Solar division, took over the project at the end of November 2016. On January 22, 2019, the Clearway Energy Group obtained NRG Community Solar's assets.

== Education ==
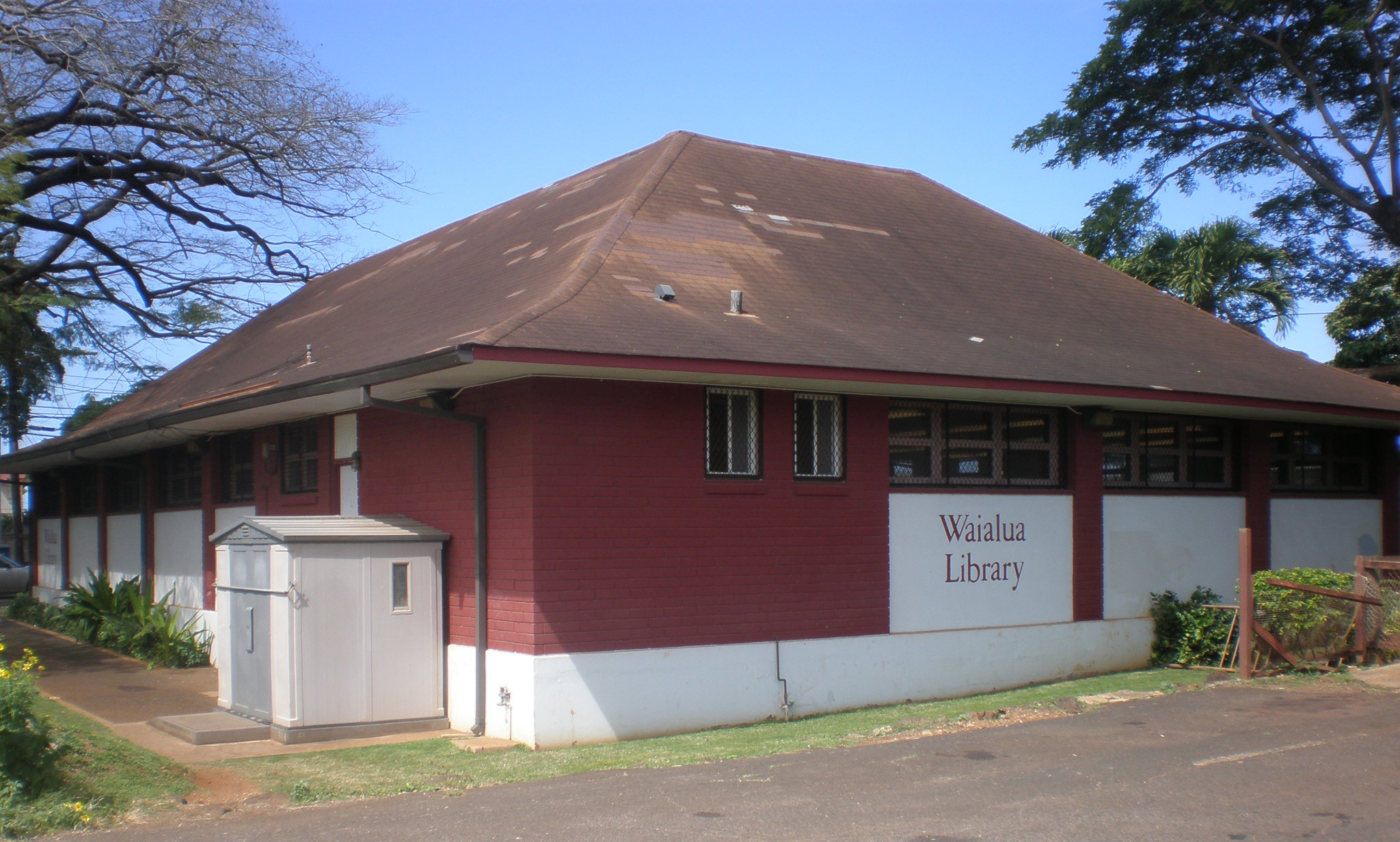
Waialua Library

Hawaii Department of Education operates public schools. Waialua Elementary School and Waialua High & Intermediate School are in the CDP.

The Roman Catholic Diocese of Honolulu operates St. Michael School, a K-8 school.

Hawaii State Public Library System operates the Waialua Library.

== History ==
Many of the families in Waialua are there because of the agricultural industry, which began in the early 20th century. There was an increased demand for workers as the industry grew, resulting in workers being brought in from China, Portugal, Japan, Korea, Puerto Rico, Philippines, Spain, and other areas. Upon arriving in Hawaii, many of these workers were assigned to work in Waialua's sugarcane plantations. In the late 1980s and the 1990s, the sugar production decreased as increasing labor and production costs led producers to move overseas. Many of the families brought to Waialua during the sugar rush remained and many of their descendants still reside there.

During World War II, the twin guns from the USS Saratoga were installed 1.5 miles (2.4 km) off Kamehameha Highway near Waialua for use as gun batteries attached to Hawaiian Pineapple Company Camp Brodie 4.
