= Kaimū, Hawaii =

Kaimu, Hawaii Kaimu Kaimu Beach Park
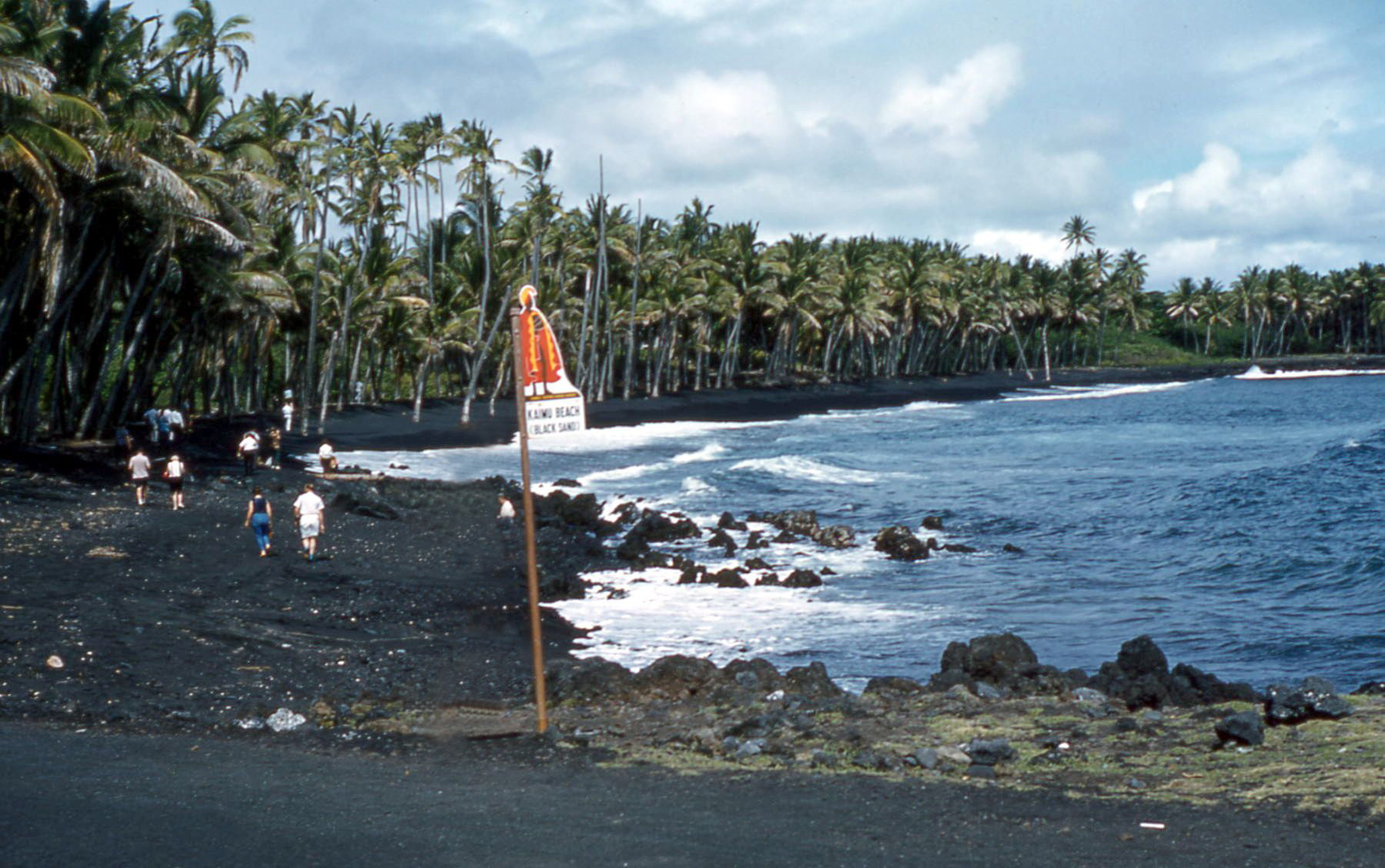
- Kaimū Beach, also known as Black Sand Beach, 1959. Beginning in 1983, eruption from the Kīlauea volcano began to affect the area, completely covering it by 1990.
- Interactive map of Kaimu, Hawaii
- Coordinates: 19°21′30″N 154°58′30″W

Population (2024)
  - Total: 0

Kaimū was a small town in the Puna District on Island of Hawaiʻi that was completely destroyed by an eruptive flow of lava from the Kūpaʻianahā vent of the Kīlauea volcano in 1990. In Hawaiian, kai mū means "gathering [at the] sea" as to watch surfing. The lava flow that destroyed Kaimū and nearby Kalapana erupted from the southeast rift zone of Kīlauea.

== Before volcanic destruction ==
Kaimū was located on Kaimū Bay. The bay was world-famous for its black sand beach which was surrounded by shady palm trees. Kaimū was the birthplace of Hawaiian nationalist leader Joseph Nāwahī.

== After volcanic destruction ==
Now both the bay and the town are buried under some 50 feet (15 m) of lava. A large section of State Route 130 (Kaimu-Chain of Craters Road) was also covered by the lava. The road is on top of the cooled lava now, with some homes built on top of the lava. There is also the New Beach, black sand like the old, where locals and visitors are bringing sprouted coconuts and planting them to restore the lost trees.

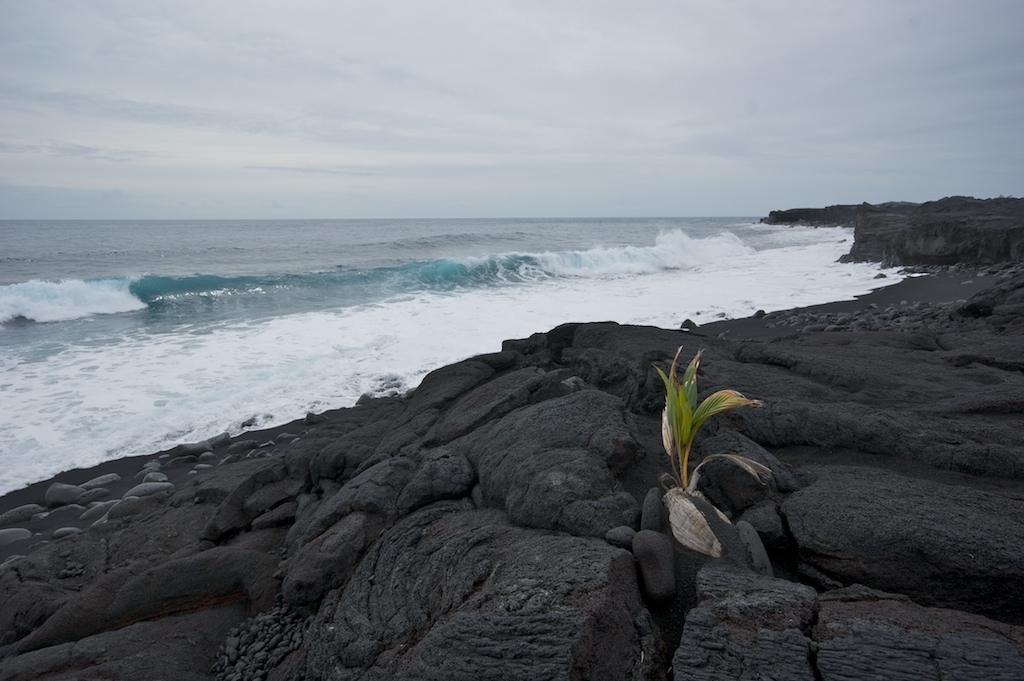
New Beach on Kaimū Bay, formed by volcanic flows in 1990, as seen in 2009.

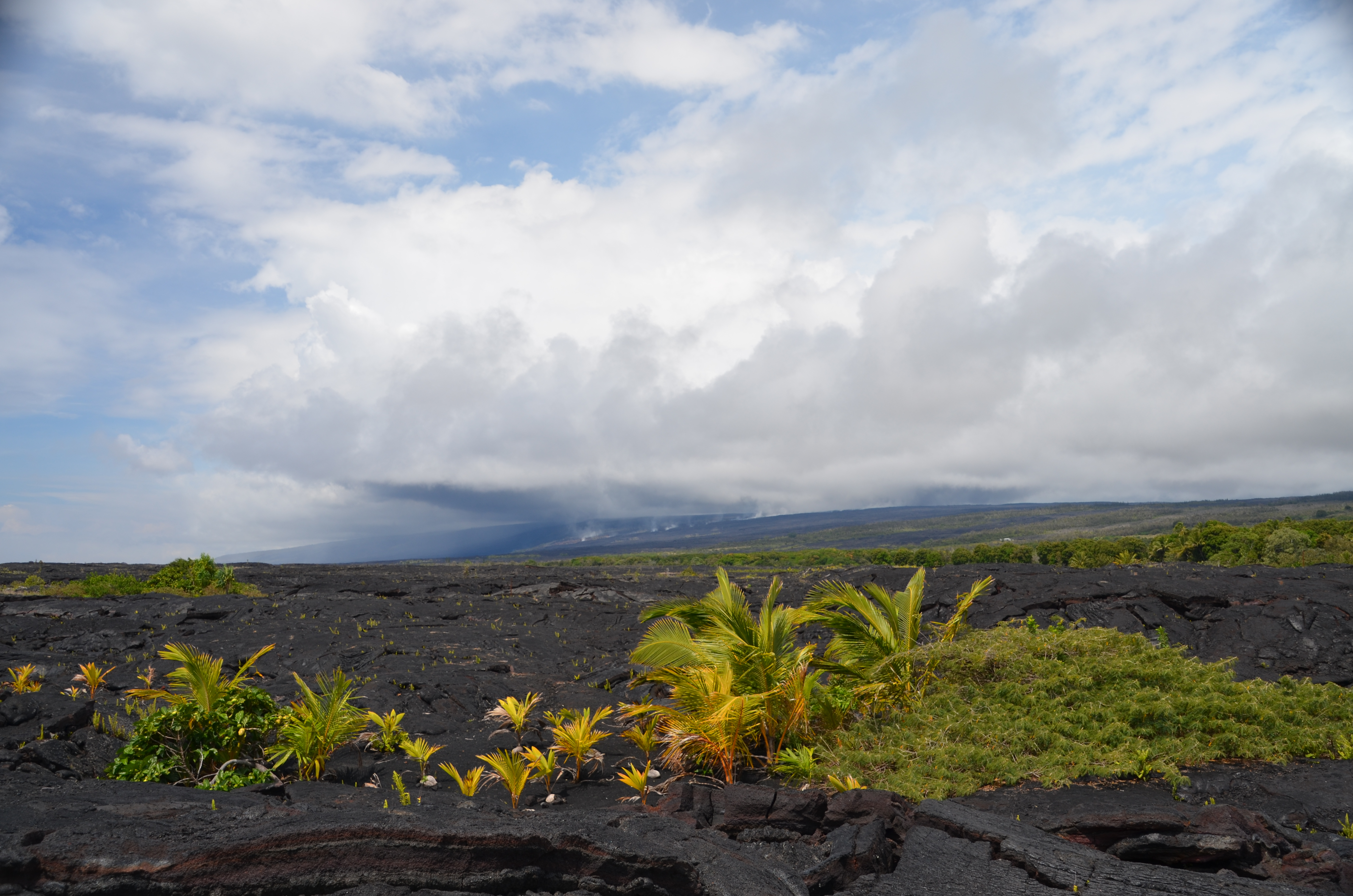
New vegetation on the 1990 pāhoehoe lava in the former Kaimū Bay
