= Waialua Sugar Mill =

Historical sugar refinery on Oahu, Hawaii

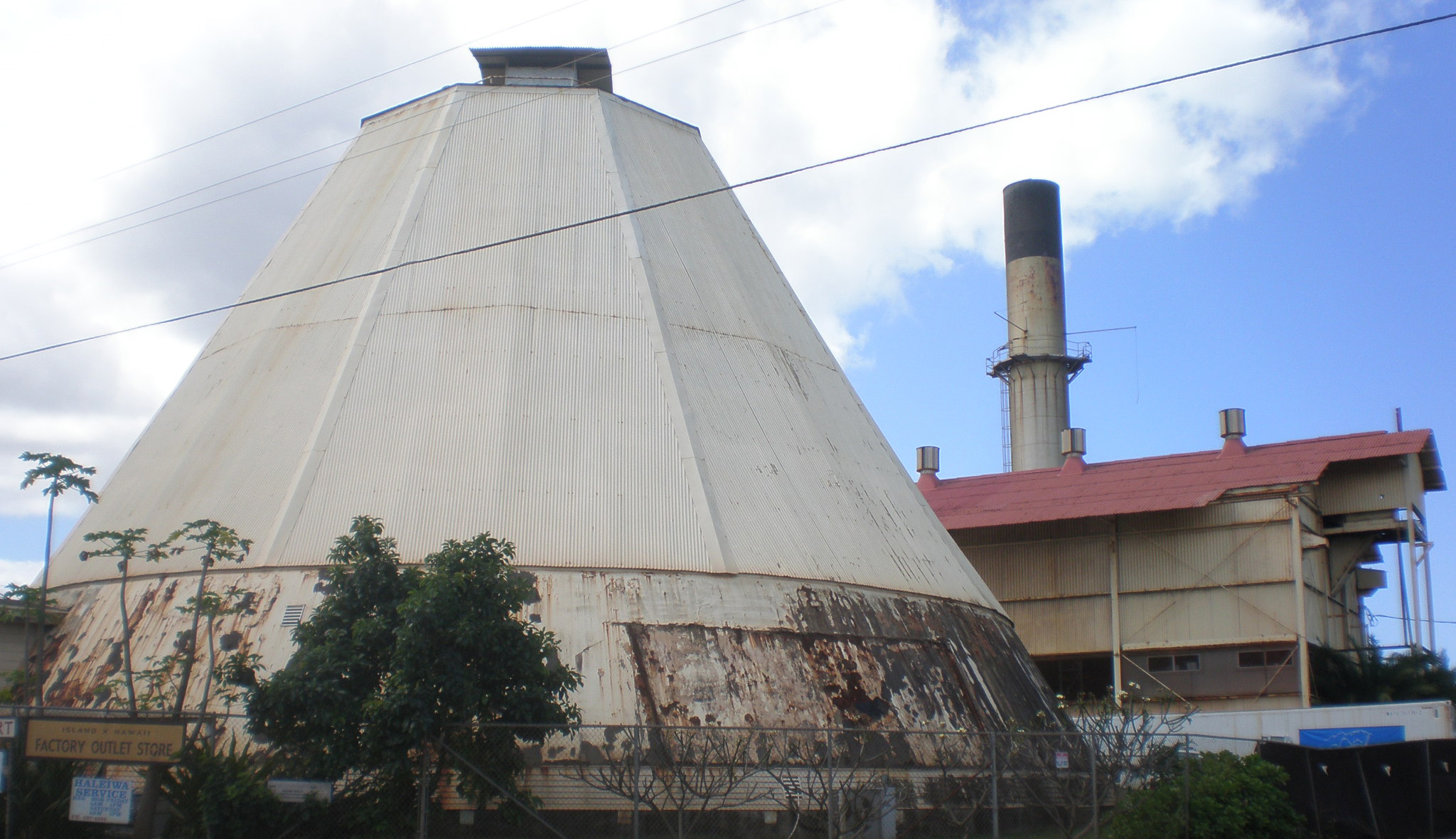
Waialua Sugar Mill buildings in 2009

The Waialua Sugar Mill, formally known as the Chamberlain Plantation, was a sugarcane plantation and historical sugar mill, located in the town of Waialua on the North Shore of Oahu. It was in operation from 1865 until 1996.

== History ==
In 1865, Levi (Jr.) and Warren Chamberlain, sons of the missionary Levi Chamberlain, started a sugarcane plantation in Waialua that ultimately failed. Robert Halstead bought the Chamberlain plantation in 1875 under the partnership of Halstead & Gordon, for $25,000. Gordon died in 1888, and the plantation was managed by the Halstead Brothers, Robert and his two sons, Edgar and Frank. In 1898, Castle & Cooke, one of Hawaii's Big Five trading and sugar industry management companies, formed the Waialua Agricultural Company and purchased the plantation from the Halstead Brothers.

By the end of 1898, a new mill was constructed, and the first crop harvested in 1899, producing 1,741 tons of sugar. Castle & Cooke also expanded the acreage, built a railway system, and maximized ground and surface water storage and irrigation systems. Between 1900 and 1906, four surface water collection systems were constructed, giving the Waialua sugar plantation the largest water storage capacity in the state of Hawaii. As a result of these efforts, sugar production increased from less than 5000 to 20,000 tons from 1900-1905. Mechanical loading of harvested cane began to replace manual labor using self-propelled machines in 1920. Later, the Waialua plantation would co-generate electricity and sell it to local communities, contributing a small percentage to Hawaii's energy production.

By 1991, the mill was producing eight percent of sugar in Hawaii as the Waialua Sugar Company, a subsidiary of the Dole Food Company. However, the plantation was unable to increase the tons of sugar per acre yields. The Waialua Sugar Mill finally closed in October, 1996 due to profit concerns and was the last sugarcane plantation on the island of Oahu to close.

By 1999, the site's sugar workers camp was still inhabited by former Filipino laborers.

The area currently serves as an industrial park for the North Shore of Oahu. In 2020, the 25 acres were put up for sale.
