= Maunaulu =

Volcanic cone in Hawaii, USA

Coordinates: 19°22′02″N 155°12′05″W

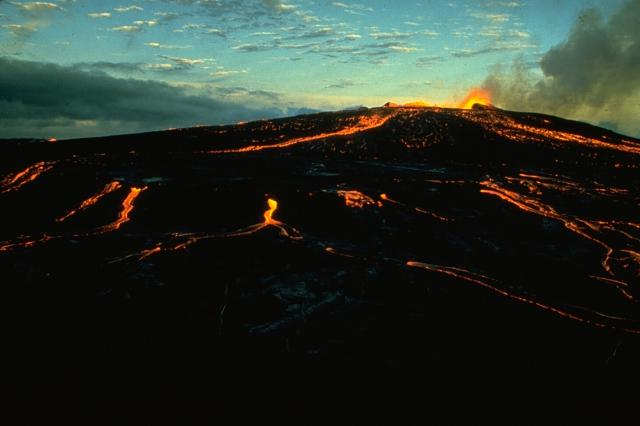
Maunaulu erupting in 1974

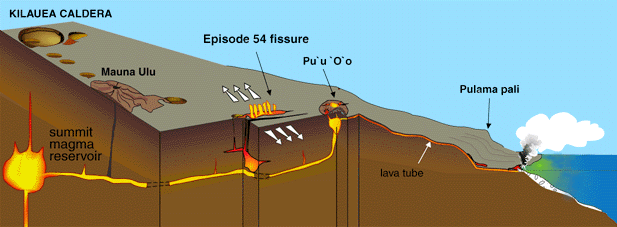
Cutaway view of Kilauea's eastern rift zone. Maunaulu can be seen to the right of Kilauea Caldera.

Maunaulu, also known as Mauna Ulu, is a volcanic cone in the eastern rift zone of the Kīlauea volcano on the island of Hawaiʻi. It falls within the bounds of Hawaiʻi Volcanoes National Park. Maunaulu was in a state of eruption from May 1969 to July 1974.

== Name ==
The name Maunaulu means "growing mountain". The U.S. Board on Geographic Names updated the spelling of the feature from Mauna Ulu to Maunaulu in 2015.

== Eruption ==
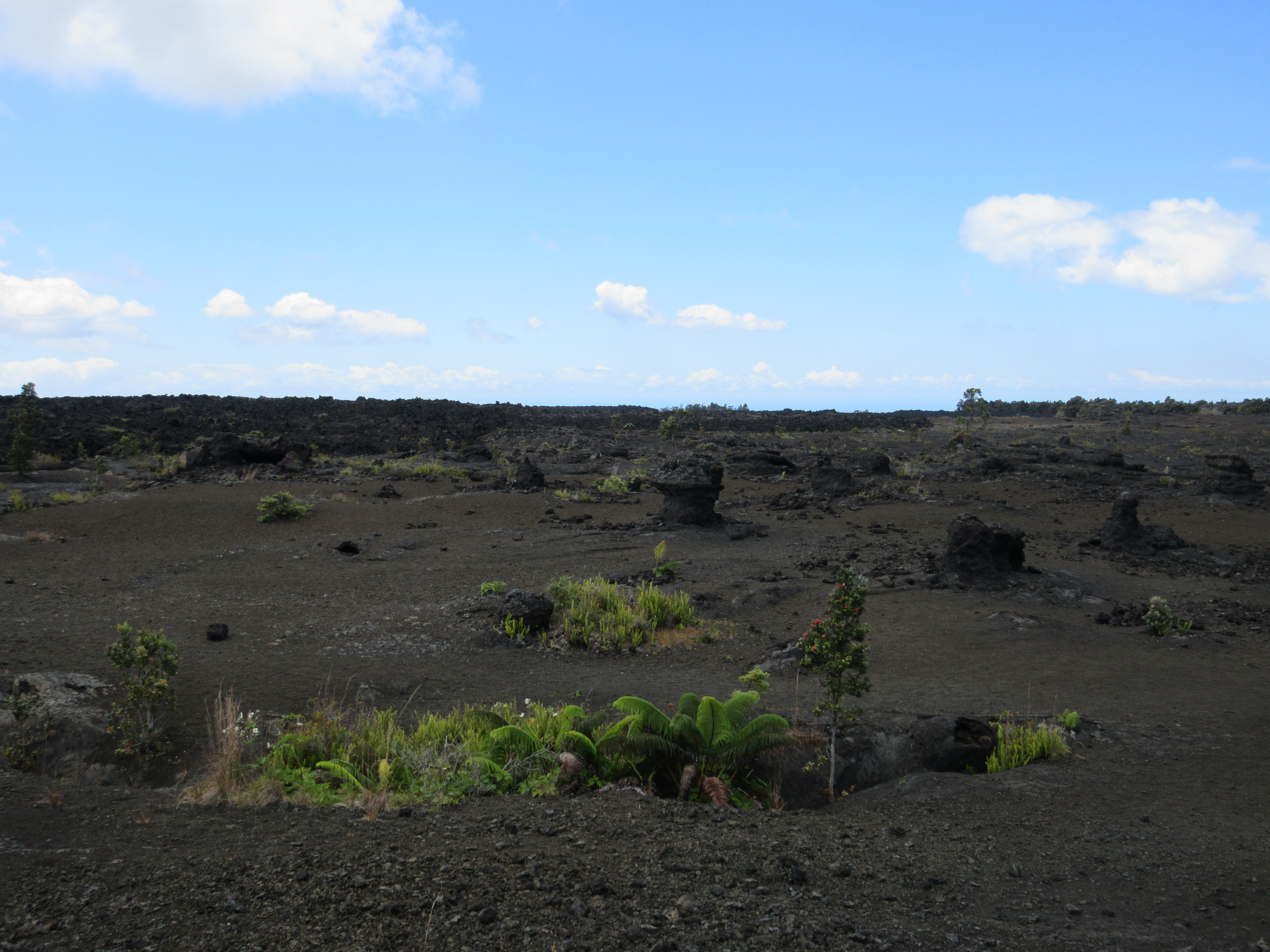
Toadstool-shaped formations dot the desolate landscape of Maunaulu.

The eruption that formed Maunaulu began on May 24, 1969 and continued until July 22, 1974. At the time, this was the longest-lasting and most voluminous eruption on Kīlauea's flank in at least 2,200 years, lasting 1,774 days and producing 350 million cubic meters of lava. Lava flowed down the sides of the feature and large lava fountains (including one 539.5 meter high fountain) were witnessed. The flows formed during this time period cover 44 square km and some lava deposits are reported to be 7.6 meters deep. The flows destroyed parts of land around what is now Chain of Craters Road, but the damage has since been repaired and the dormant cone can now be visited.
