= Kapoho, Hawaii =

Former community on the island of Hawaii

Coordinates: 19°30.164′N 154°50.762′W

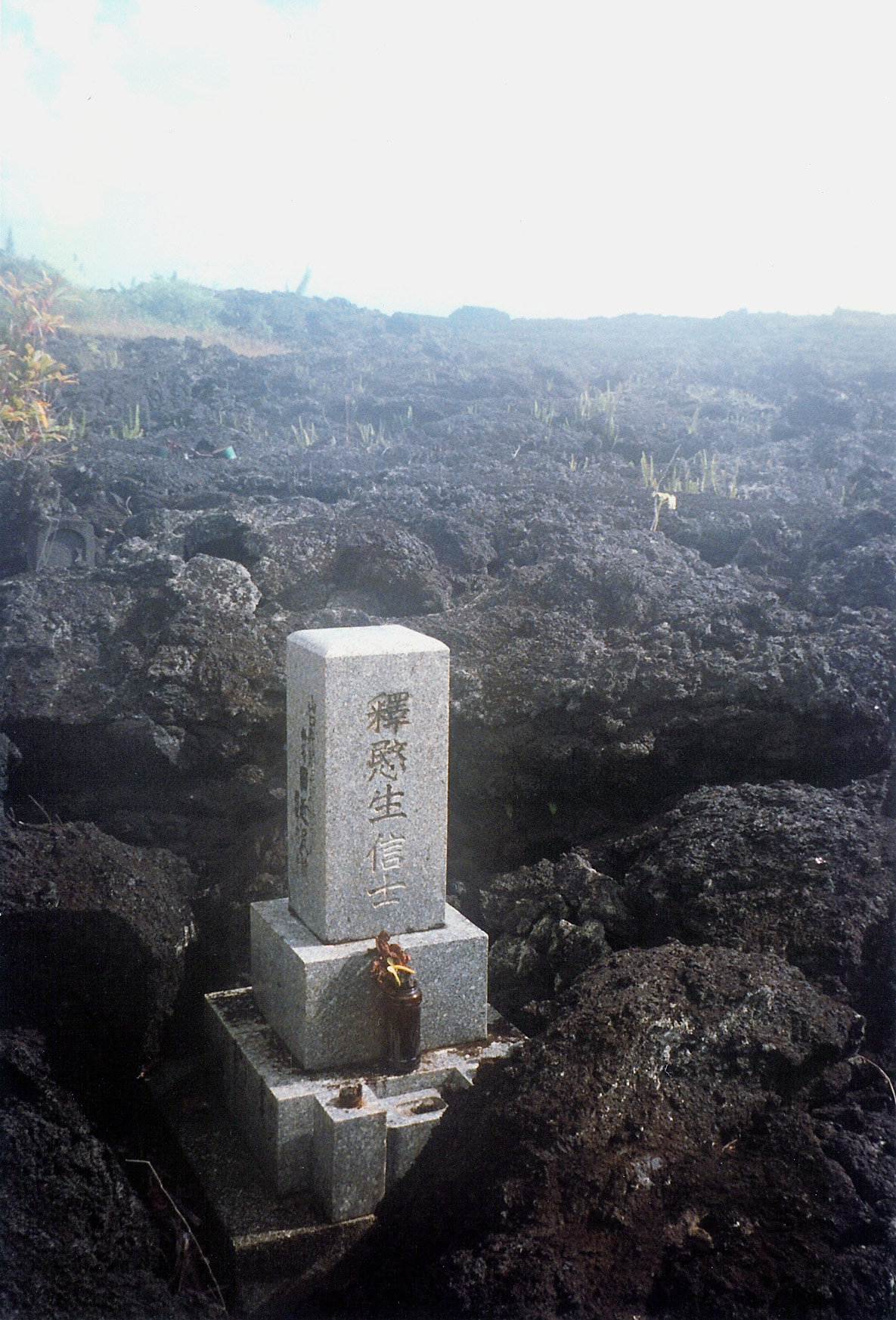
Cemetery in Kapoho

Kapoho is a now-uninhabited unincorporated area in Puna district, Hawaii County, Hawaii, US, located near the eastern tip of the island of Hawaii, in the easternmost subaerial end of the graben overlying Kīlauea's east rift zone. Originally destroyed by an eruption of Kīlauea in 1960, it was rebuilt as a community of private homes and vacation rentals. The town was again destroyed by lava during the 2018 lower Puna eruption, this time with adjacent Kapoho Bay largely buried by lava as well.

== Eruption of January 1960 ==
On January 12, 1960, residents of Kapoho experienced over 1,000 small earthquakes shaking the area. Deep cracks opened up in the street, and there are historic photos of residents inspecting the damage.

The eruption began on the night of the 13th, spilling lava out in the middle of a sugar cane field just above Kapoho. Although the main flow of lava flowed into the ocean, a slow-moving offshoot crept towards the town of Kapoho. Despite frantic efforts to divert the flow with earthen barricades or to harden it by spraying water on it, on January 28 the flow entered and buried the town. Nearly 100 homes and businesses as well as a hot spring resort were destroyed. The Cape Kumukahi Light east of the town was spared and continues in operation, but the keeper's dwellings were destroyed.

== 1960 to 2018 ==
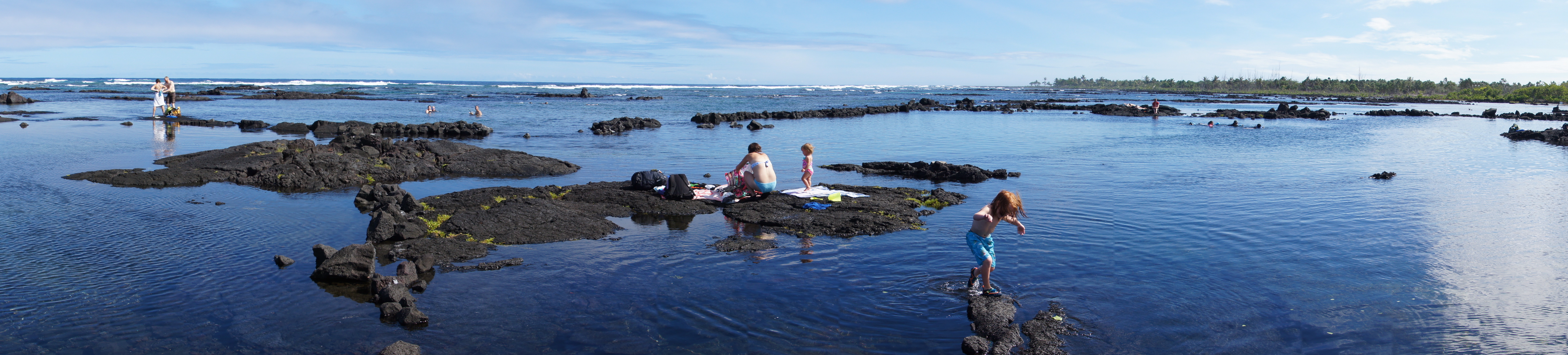
There were many snorkeling possibilities at the interconnected tidal pools of Kapoho.

There was no lava activity in Kapoho for close to 60 years. The natural tide pools, black sand beach, and warm hot springs transformed Kapoho into an attractive spot to live and for tourists to visit. Owing to these two factors, despite being in a very high-risk lava flow hazard zone (zone 1, the highest risk zone), Kapoho became the most expensive area to live in Puna, with many homes costing over $1,000,000.

== 2018 lower Puna eruption ==
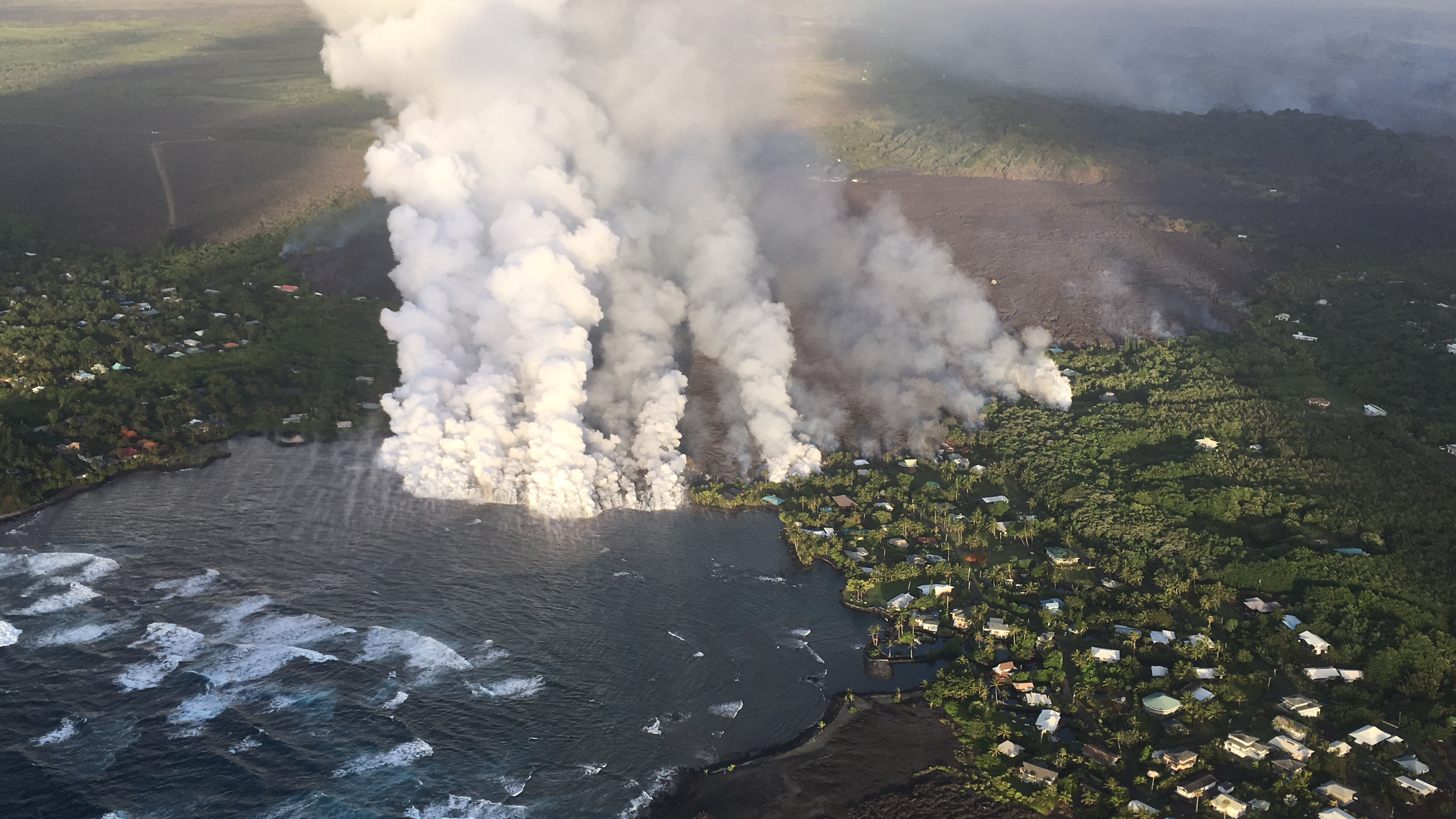
On June 4, 2018, the channel of lava from a fissure ten miles (16 km) inland (from upper right) cuts through the homes of Vacationland and Kapoho Beach Lots, and begins to fill in the tide pools and Kapoho Bay.

The 2018 lower Puna eruption interrupted electric power to Kapoho in late May and closed the main road to the rest of the island. On May 30, residents were urged to evacuate. On June 1, the lava flow front entered Kapoho on top of the 1960 flow and then took a turn to the south. On June 2, 2018, the Green Lake (Ka Wai o Pele) was destroyed when lava flows boiled it away and completely filled the entire basin. The flow entered the ocean at Kapoho Bay on June 4 on a half-mile-wide (800 m) front. An unknown number of homes were destroyed by the lava on June 4, but the majority were still standing. By June 5, the lava flow had built a lava delta that extended nearly 3,700 feet (1.1 km) into the bay. Hawaiʻi County officials indicated that hundreds of homes in the subdivisions of Vacationland Hawaii and Kapoho Beach Lots were destroyed by the rapidly advancing lava flow. Hawaii Island Mayor Harry Kim's house, which he had purchased in 1971 as a second residence, was among the hundreds of houses destroyed. Over the next few days, the entirety of the bay was filled in with lava, and on June 6, Hawaii County Civil Defense reported that the few homes remaining in Vacationland had been wiped out. An adjacent subdivision, the gated Kapoho Beach Lots, also suffered lava inundation and was largely covered, along with the Kapoho tide pools, Kapoho Bay, and the nearby Champagne Ponds.

By the end of June, about 520 acres (2.1 km^{2}) of new land had been created along with miles of new coastline.

== See also ==
- 1960 eruption of Kīlauea
