= Cape Kumukahi Light =

Lighthouse at the easternmost point of Hawaii

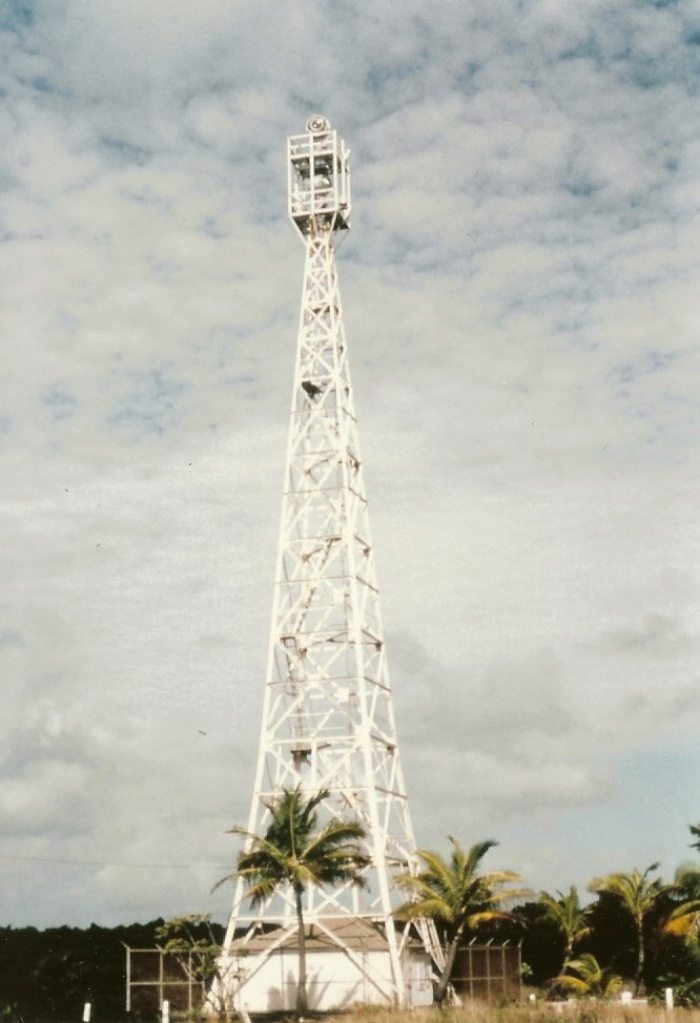
- Location: Cape Kumukahi; Kapoho, Hawaii
- Coordinates: 19.516°N 154.811°W

Tower
- Constructed: 1929 (first)
- Foundation: concrete base
- Construction: steel skeletal tower
- Automated: 1960
- Height: 125 feet (38 m)
- Shape: square pyramidal skeletal tower
- Markings: white tower
- Operator: United States Coast Guard

Light
- First lit: 1934 (current)
- Focal height: 156 feet (48 m)
- Lens: 14.8 inches (375 mm) (original), Carlisle & Finch DCB-224 aero beacon (current)
- Range: 24 nautical miles (44 km; 28 mi)
- Characteristic: Fl W 15s.

The Cape Kumukahi Light is a lighthouse in Kapoho, Hawaii at the easternmost point of Hawaii. It is best known for its survival of an eruption of Kilauea in 1960.

== History ==
Requests for a lighthouse on the cape, the easternmost point of the island chain, began in 1905. The lighthouse board reasoned that a light at the site would assist in landfall for ships approaching from Cape Horn and the newly opened Panama Canal. Nonetheless, these requests were not heeded until 1928, when a 32 feet (9.8 m) wooden tower was erected, with an automatic acetylene beacon.

In 1933-1934 a more substantial station was constructed. This consisted of a pair of wooden keeper's houses and a steel tower, the latter resting on a unique foundation consisting of two stacked concrete blocks with a layer of sand in between, a scheme intended to insulate the tower from the many minor earthquakes in the area. The light itself was upgraded to a rotating aerobeacon.

Cape Kumukahi lies at the end of the east rift zone of the slopes of Kilauea, and the light was threatened several times by eruptions. The most serious threat came from the 1960 eruption which destroyed the town of Kapoho; lava flows continued downslope toward the light, and destroyed the keepers' houses and an orchard which Joe Pestrella, who had been keeper there since 1938, had planted by the light station; but when the lava reached the tower, it split into two streams and flowed into the sea to either side, sparing the structure. After the eruption ceased, a new electric line was run to the light and it was automated, and Pestrella was transferred to Makapuu Point Light, where he remained until he retired in 1963, the last civilian keeper in the islands. Pestrella had previously been awarded "Civil Servant of the Year" in 1956 for staying at his post during an eruption the year before.

The light continues in automated operation. In addition, NOAA maintains a sampling facility for the Global Monitoring Division of the Earth System Research Laboratories on the grounds of the light, as the trade winds bring fresh oceanic air to the site at all times.

== See also ==
- List of lighthouses in Hawaii
