= 1983 Kaoiki earthquake =

Natural disaster in Hawaii, United States

- Location within Hawaii
- UTC time: 1983-11-16 16:13:00
- ISC event: 565031
- USGS-ANSS: ComCat
- Local date: November 16, 1983; 42 years ago
- Local time: 06:13:00 (UTC-10)
- Magnitude: 6.7 M_{w}
- Depth: 12 km (7 mi)
- Epicenter: 19.426°N 155.450°W
- Fault: Kaoiki Fault
- Type: Right-lateral Strike-slip
- Areas affected: Hawaii
- Total damage: $6-7 million (1983 rate)
- Max. intensity: MMI IX (Violent)
- Peak acceleration: 0.67 g
- Landslides: yes
- Aftershocks: >800 aftershocks by the end of November 1983
- Casualties: 6 injuries

The 1983 Kaoiki earthquake struck southern Hawaii Island on the morning of November 16, 1983. Measuring M_{w} 6.7, it was the largest to hit the island since 1975. The epicenter was located 50 km (30 mi) southeast of Hilo with an approximated depth of 12 km (7 mi). The shallow strike-slip earthquake was assigned a maximum intensity of IX (Violent) on the Modified Mercalli scale. Six people were injured, widespread damage and landslides were reported across the island.

== Tectonic setting ==
The epicenter in Kaoiki lies within a valley between the western slope of Mauna Loa, and northwest of Kīlauea. Seismicity in the area is caused by the continuous movement of the Kilauea and Mauna Loa slumps generated by the continuous magmatic flow underground. This strain forms the many faults around the Kilauea block and the notable Hilina Slump. The slump is situated underwater—below the southern flanks of Kilauea. As the block continues to stretch at around 10 cm/year seaward, the crust becomes thinner, causing cracks, fissures, and a trend of aligning normal faults. The Kaoiki Pali is an example of a Hilina slump- induced normal fault, striking northeast and stretching 25 km (15.5 mi) across the Mauna Loa and Kilauea boundary. The scarps that the Kaoiki Pali produces have vertical displacements of up to 100 m (300 ft). While these displacements are present in large amounts, most of these faults have not moved in over 9,500 years. However, this slump also affects the ground-level sliding on Mauna Loa. Although it rarely occurs, when it does, it causes major fractures due to its narrow connection with Kilauea. This displacement is what causes the extensive strike-slip faults and earthquakes in the area. And as these faults rupture, it produces major earthquakes above magnitude 6 that inflict extreme damage and casualties; along with deadly tsunamis and landslides as observed in 1975 and 1868.

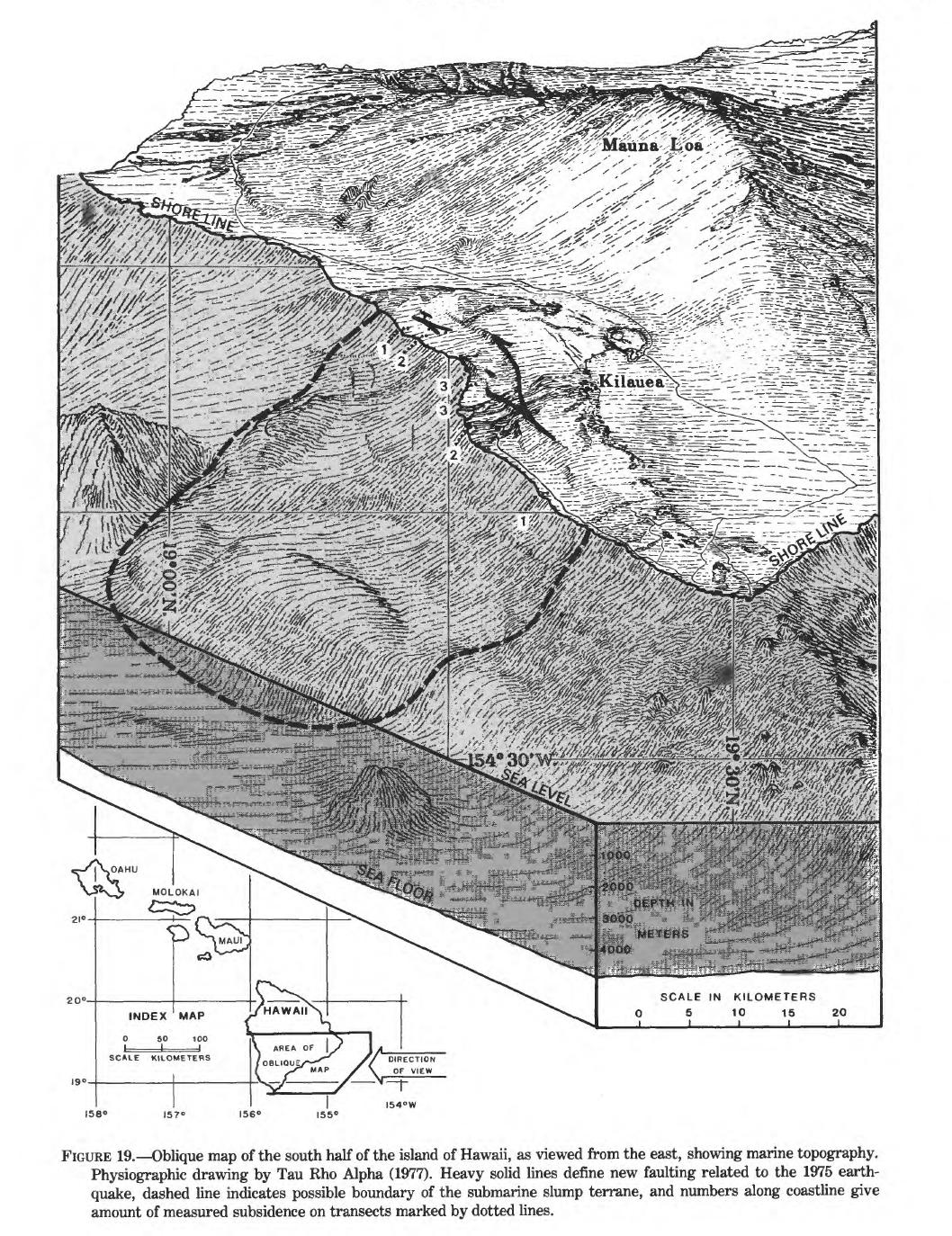
A detailed illustration of the Hilina Slump

=== Kaoiki fault ===
One of the most active faults in the Mauna Loa trend is the Kaoiki fault. Located at the northernmost head of the volcano, but also lying within the lowest areas of the block. Earthquakes associated with the fault are known for creating multiple ground ruptures in an east-west fashion, mostly paired with left-stepping from other adjacent ruptures, and causing open ruptures of up to 0.5 m. This right-lateral strike-slip fault has long coexisted with the volcanic low-angle seaward normal faults within the Hilina slump for approximately 30,000 years.

== Earthquake ==
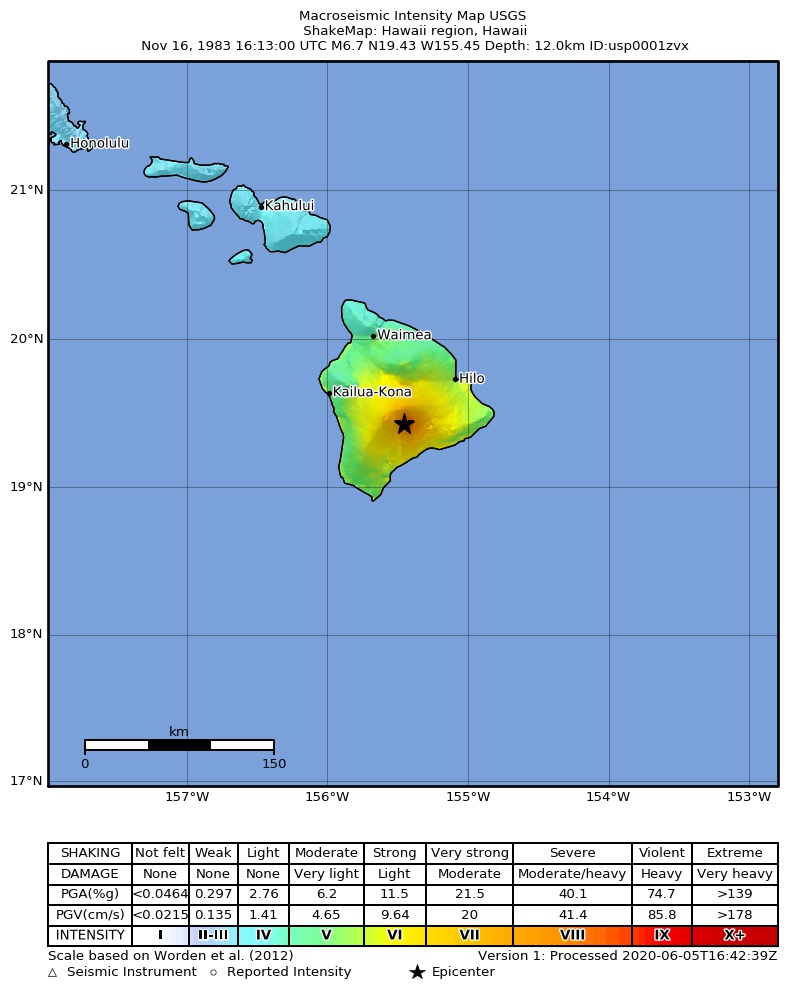
An isoseismic USGS ShakeMap of the earthquake

The earthquake was recorded by seismic stations in and around Kaoiki, recording a moment magnitude of 6.7 M_{w}, as well as recordings in other magnitude scales; magnitudes of 6.6 M_{L}, 6.6–6.7 M_{s}, and 6.4–6.6 M_{t} respectively. The Hawaiian Volcano Observatory (HVO) recorded vertical accelerations of up to 0.67 g and assigned a maximum intensity of IX (Violent) on the Modified Mercalli intensity scale. According to reports, the strong oscillations lasted for almost one minute. Following the trend of the originated Kaoiki fault, as well as earthquake data from the nearby HVO Station in Hawai'i National Park, the earthquake is suggested to have a focal mechanism of right-lateral strike-slip with a northeast–trending nodal plane. The sufficient inflation at the Mauna Loa and Kilauea magma reservoirs had enough parallel horizontal compressional stress to snap the strike-slip faulting regions in-between the slopes. Crustal right-lateral faulting with en echelon extensions was found on the 1,900 meter elevation at Mauna Loa road, tracing 4.5 km on both sides of the road, with extensions at lengths of about 20–30 cm (7.87 in) on the main fracture.

By the end of November, approximately 10,000 small earthquakes were reported in the vicinity of the epicenter. 800 of these had magnitudes ranging from 1.0–4.3 M_{w}. The zone of aftershocks highlighted an area of Kaoiki from the summit of Mauna Loa to the southeast slope of Kilauea. These aftershocks reportedly had depths ranging from 2–12 km below and radiated from the epicenter. Most aftershocks within a few hours after the mainshock occurred 5–6 km from the epicenter. Theories suggest that after the mainshock rupture, another low angle slip had released compression, reversing the pattern of the aftershocks from the mainshock.

=== Seismic quiescence ===
About 2.5 years prior to the earthquake, a range of 65–90% drop in seismicity was observed within a 10 km radius of the epicenter. Seismic rate samples from the mid-1970s to the 1980s were compared to the window of time, and the region lacked more than 300 earthquakes with M ≥1.8. The drop in seismicity is said to be one of the most prevalent examples proving the theory of seismic quiescence. The seismic quiescence theory focuses on the phenomenon of abnormal decreases in seismic activity within a particular area. This theory has yet to be fully recognized due to its lack of evidence and research dedicated to the topic. While other examples of seismic quiescence have occurred in the past, it has been disregarded or overlapped by other theories as to why that is. One of the main characteristics of seismic quiesences is the lack of 50% or more seismic volume compared to its usual rate, which was the case of the Kaoiki quake. While the real reason on how this occurs is still unknown, people who support the theory say its due to the ranging tectonic differences along plates and plate boundaries. Another reason as to why that is may have been caused by the shear pause on the magmatic plain and strain release.

== Damage ==
The earthquake threw houses off their foundations, toppled water tanks, cracked bridges, collapsed chimneys, damaged multiple government facilities, and toppled electric cables, generating multiple power interruptions in the area. About 35 commercial buildings sustained damage, 317 houses sustained minor damage, and around 39 other houses were seriously damaged. These reports were recorded as far as Hilo. The damage suggested intensities of VIII (Severe). In total, financial losses were estimated at $6–7 million (1983 rate). Landslides had also occurred, blocking multiple roads and suspending travel across the island. There were only a few casualties; 6 individuals received light injuries, which may have been due to the fact that it occurred early in the morning, when most people were in bed.

Ground ruptures were prominent in the areas surrounding the epicenter, observed 4 km northeast following the nodal trend. This trail continues for 7 km in the same direction and trend. It stops beyond the expected aftershock zone, which suggests that the elastic release of the last ruptures may have been a result of aseismic deformations of the fault. These ruptures extend up to heights of 20 m (65.6 ft) with jagged walls hanging with suggested pre-existing joints that were hidden beneath the sediment. The expected left-stepping was observed in the rupture zone, which was less deformed compared to other ruptures and showed less subdued zig-zag patterns.

== See also ==
- Lists of 20th-century earthquakes
- List of earthquakes in 1983
- List of earthquakes in Hawaii
- 1975 Hawaii earthquake
- Hilina Slump
