= 2018 Hawaii earthquake =

6.9-magnitude earthquake in Hawaii

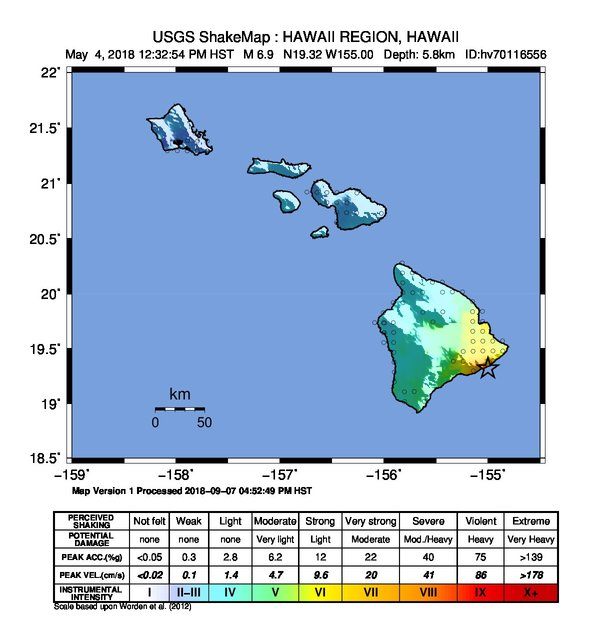
- Shakemap for the 2018 Hawaii earthquake

- Location within Hawaii
- UTC time: 2018-05-04 22:32:55
- ISC event: 611928827
- USGS-ANSS: ComCat
- Local date: May 4, 2018
- Local time: 12:33 p.m. HST
- Magnitude: 6.9 M_{ww}
- Depth: 5.8 km (4 mi)
- Epicenter: 19.313°N 154.998°W
- Type: Thrust fault
- Max. intensity: MMI VIII (Severe)
- Tsunami: Up to 0.4 m (1.3 ft) in Kapoho.
- Aftershocks: 15,307 (As of December 31, 2018)
- Casualties: None

On May 4, 2018, an earthquake with a magnitude of M_{w} 6.9 struck Hawaii island in the Hawaii archipelago at around 12:33 p.m. local time. The earthquake's epicenter was near the south flank of Kīlauea, which has been the site of seismic and volcanic activity since late April of that year. According to the United States Geological Survey the quake was related to the new lava outbreaks at the volcano, and it resulted in the Hilina Slump moving about two feet. It was the largest earthquake to affect Hawaii since the 1975 earthquake, which affected the same region resulting in two fatalities and 28 injured.

The earthquake had a maximum strength on the Mercalli intensity scale of VIII (Severe). The earthquake was preceded by a smaller event, measuring 5.4, that was felt across the island and as far away as Oahu.

The earthquake produced a minor tsunami that reached a maximum height of 40 cm (15.7 in.) in Kapoho, 20 cm (7.9 in.) in Hilo and 15 cm (5.9 in.) in Honuapo.

== Tectonic setting ==
Hawaii island is affected by a large number of minor earthquakes related to the movement of magma beneath its active volcanoes. Additionally there are less frequent tectonic earthquakes that are caused either by faulting within the volcanoes or by slip along the basal detachment surface at the top of the oceanic crust associated with the gradual collapse of the island's flanks as it continues to be enlarged. Near Kilauea volcano, the largest structure formed by the collapse of the southeastern flank of the island is the Hilina slump. This slump moves seaward at an average rate of 10 cm/year (3.9 in/year). The slump moved during the May 4 earthquake by about 0.6 m (2.0 ft) and has moved during previous earthquakes, such as those in 1868 and 1975.

== Earthquake ==
The main earthquake was preceded almost exactly an hour earlier by a M_{w} 5.4 foreshock with a similar epicenter and focal mechanism. Analysis of seismic waveforms suggest that the mainshock was most likely caused by slip on a thrust fault dipping at 20° to the northwest beneath the southeastern flank of the volcano. The mainshock was followed by four aftershocks greater than M_{w} 4.5 over the next 30 minutes. Smaller aftershock continued to occur for months after the main earthquake.

Further analysis of Love waves, whose radiation pattern gives greater discrimination on low-angle dips, indicate that the rupture occurred on a plane dipping at about 7°, consistent with it happening at the base of the Hawaiian volcanic rocks, where they overlie sedimentary rocks on the earlier seafloor. The calculated low rupture speed is also consistent with propagation along a relatively weak zone. This would make it similar to the 1975 Kalapana earthquake.

== Damage ==
The quake slightly damaged some buildings, caused landslides that damaged shorelines, and cracks in a road, causing it to be shut down.

Foreshock and aftershock occurrence with time

Map of aftershock distribution

== See also ==
- List of earthquakes in 2018
- List of earthquakes in the United States
- List of earthquakes in Hawaii
- 2018 lower Puna eruption
