= APUA =

APUA may refer to:

- Alliance for the Prudent Use of Antibiotics
- Anthropological Papers of the University of Alaska

== See also ==
- Apua, Hawaii, a fishing village
