= Ka Lae =

Historic Place in Hawaii County, Hawaii

- South Point Complex
- U.S. National Register of Historic Places
- U.S. National Historic Landmark District
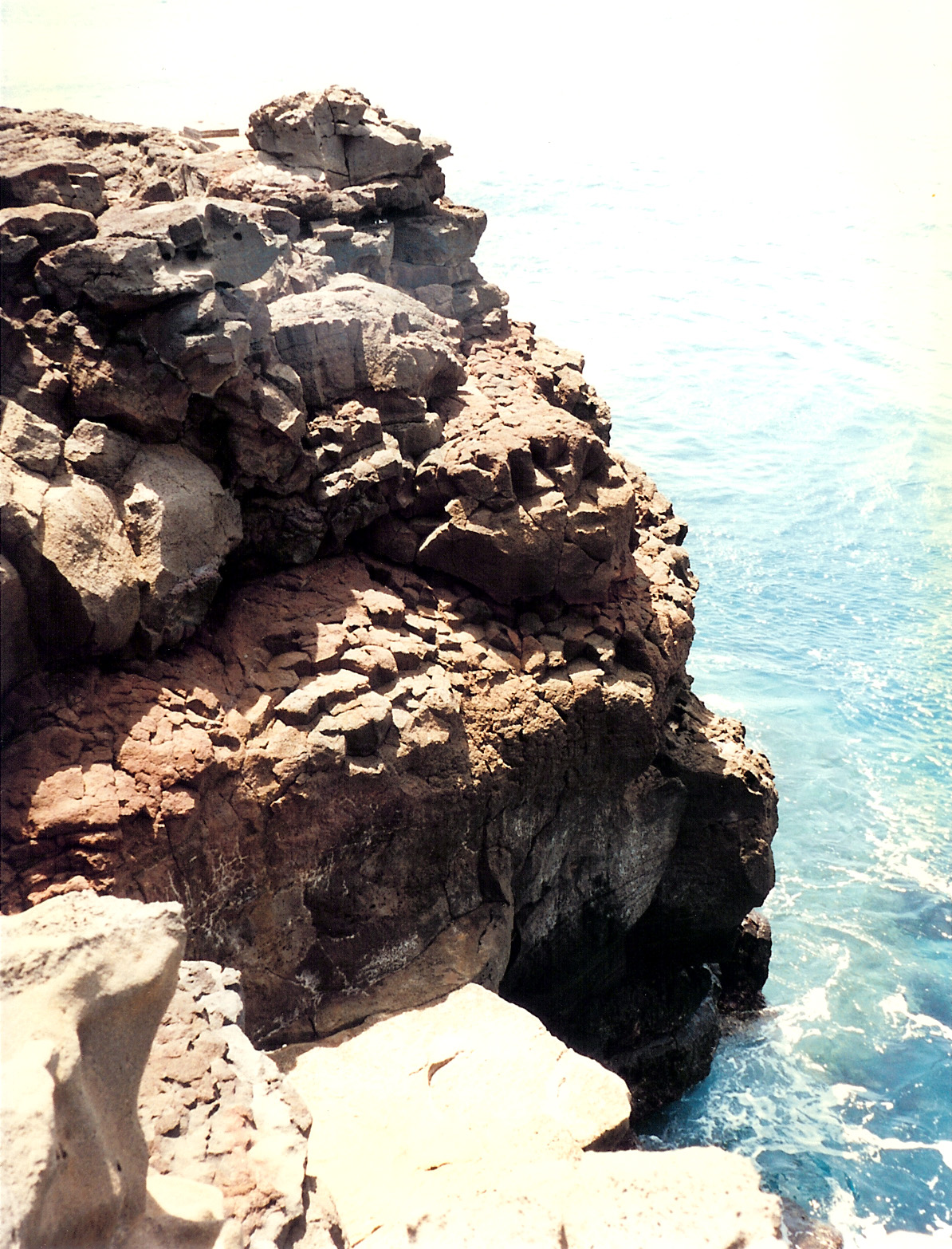
- Rocky cliffs of Ka Lae

- Location within Hawaii
- Location: Big Island of Hawaii
- Nearest city: Nā'ālehu
- Coordinates: 18.9111°N 155.681111°W
- Area: 710 acres (290 ha)
- NRHP reference No.: 66000291

Significant dates
- Added to NRHP: October 15, 1966
- Designated NHLD: December 29, 1962

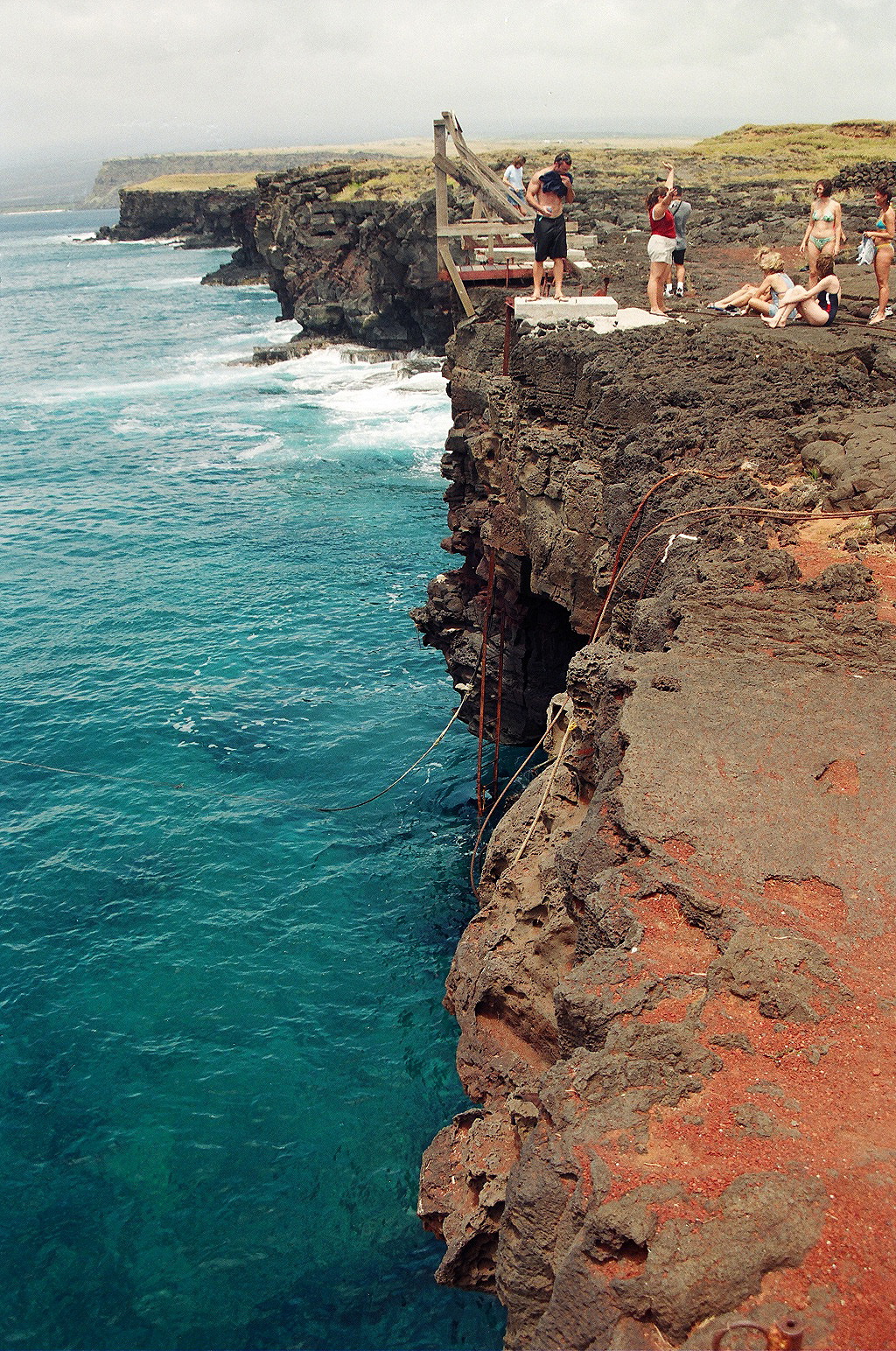
Ka Lae Point, with people getting ready to jump the cliff

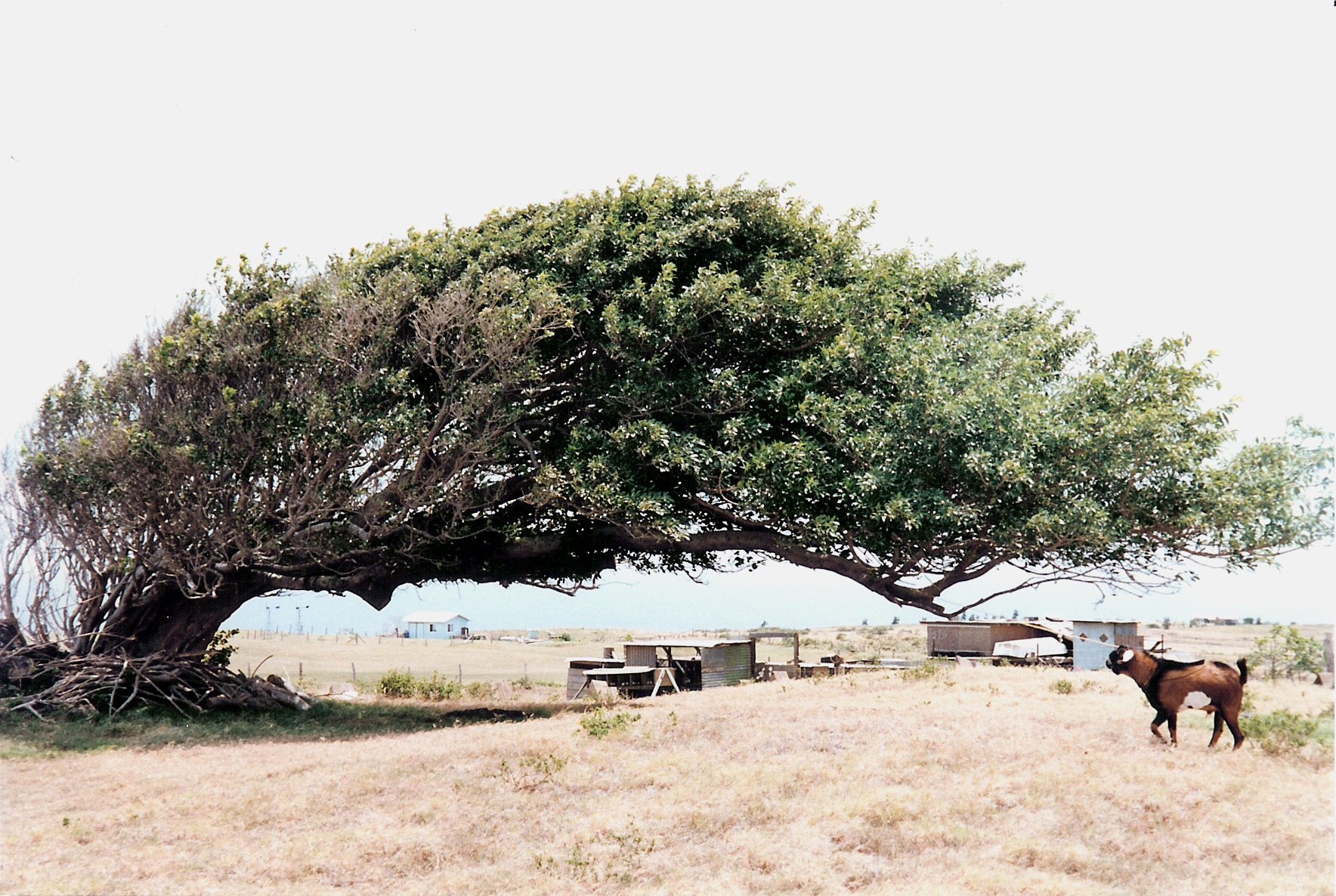
Wind-blown tree

Ka Lae (Hawaiian: the point), also known as South Point, is the southernmost point of the Big Island of Hawaii and of the 50 United States. The Ka Lae area is registered as a National Historic Landmark District under the name South Point Complex. The area is also known for its strong ocean currents and winds and is the home of a wind farm.

== Geography ==
The name for the southern tip of the island of Hawaiʻi comes from Ka Lae in the Hawaiian language which means "the point". It is often spelled as one word, Kalae, or called South Point or South Cape. A confluence of ocean currents just offshore makes this spot one of Hawaii's most popular fishing spots. Both red snapper and ulua are plentiful here. Locals fish from the cliffs, some dangling perilously over the edge of steep lava ledges. Swimming here, however, is not recommended, due to the current. In fact, it is called the "Halaea Current", named after a chief who was carried off to his death.

The confluence of currents also means the area is prone to accumulation of marine debris. Most of this coastline is very remote and difficult to access, and is probably the most debris-littered coast in the state, primarily due to its difficult access for debris removal. This debris poses an entanglement threat to wildlife and may refloat during storms. The shoreline is used by Hawaiian monk seals and hatchling hawksbill turtles, both endangered species. Efforts to clean the coastline are organized by the Hawaii Wildlife Fund in conjunction with the NOAA.

Ka Lae is accessible via South Point Road, a 12-mile paved narrow road leading from State Route 11 (Hawaii Belt Road), the turn off being about 7 miles (11 km) west of the village of Nāʻālehu and east of Ocean View, Hawaii. The strong winds cause some trees to become almost horizontal with their branches all growing in the same direction near the ground. The road forks near its end, with one branch leading south to Ka Lae and the other east to Papakolea Beach, known for its green sand.

Ka Lae is the southernmost point in the 50 United States.

== History ==
=== South Point archaeological site ===
Ka Lae is the site of one of the earliest Hawaiian settlements, and it has one of the longest archaeological records on the islands. It is generally thought that this is where the Polynesians first landed because the Big Island is the closest of the Hawaiian Islands to Tahiti, and Ka Lae would be the point of first landfall. Ruins of an ancient Hawaiian temple (heiau) and a fishing shrine can be found here. In addition, ancient Hawaiians drilled numerous holes in the rock ledges to use for mooring their canoes. Tying long ropes to their boats, they would drift out to sea to fish without fear of being carried away by the strong currents. Anthropologists from the Bishop Museum excavated the area in the 1960s.

=== Ka Lae Light ===
On March 5, 1906, a small lighthouse opened at the point. In 1908 about 10 acres (4.0 ha) were set aside for the United States Coast Guard to build a house for a keeper. At the request of William Tufts Brigham of the Bishop Museum, care was taken not to destroy the archaeological site. In 1929 a steel tower was built for the light, and in 1972 a new 32 foot (10m) concrete tower with solar power was built.

A NOAA Weather Radio transmitter broadcasts weather reports from KBA99 with callsign WWG27 on 162.55 MHz. A weather station also monitors wind speed.

=== Recent history ===
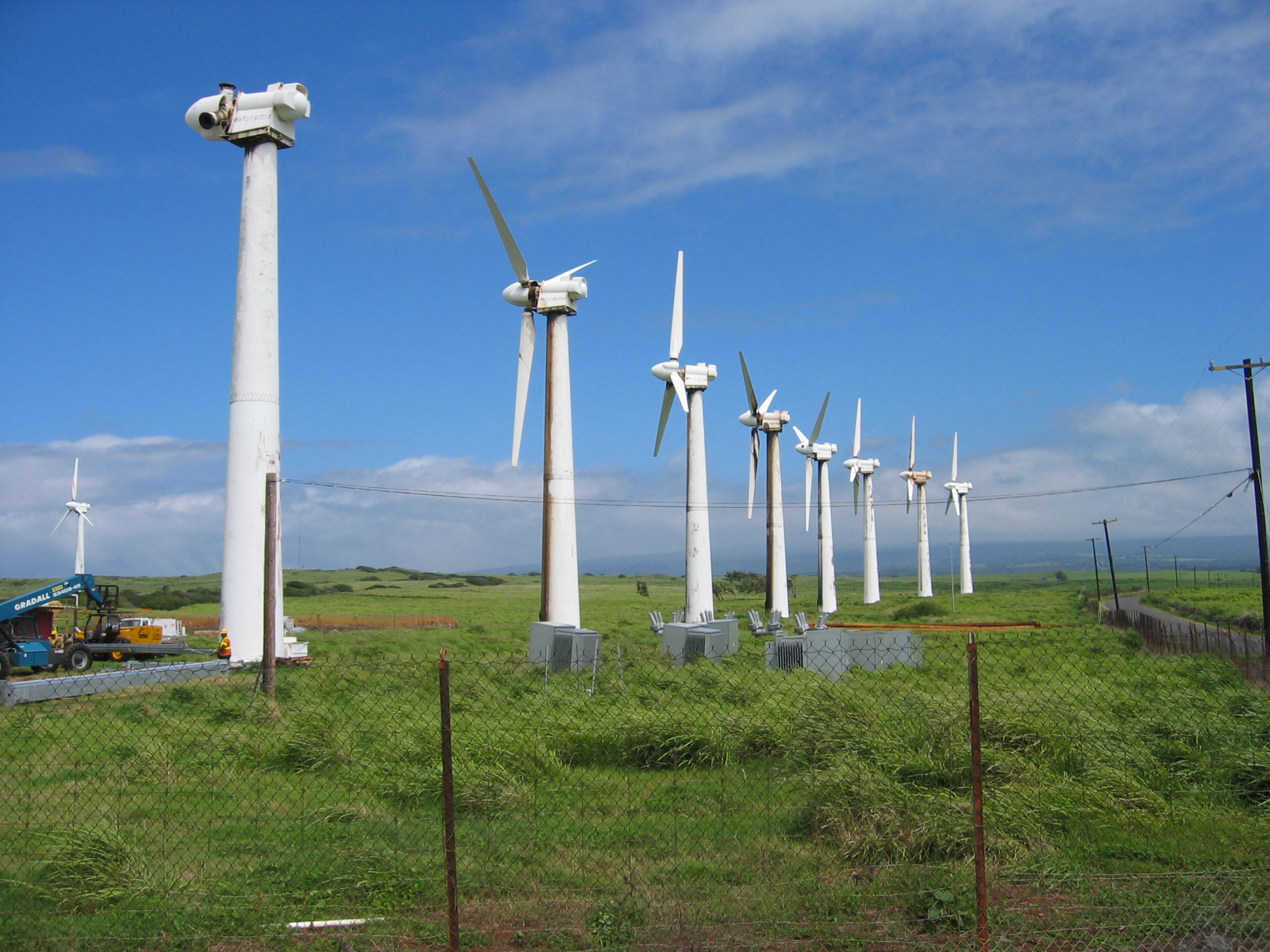
Old Kamaoa wind farm at South Point

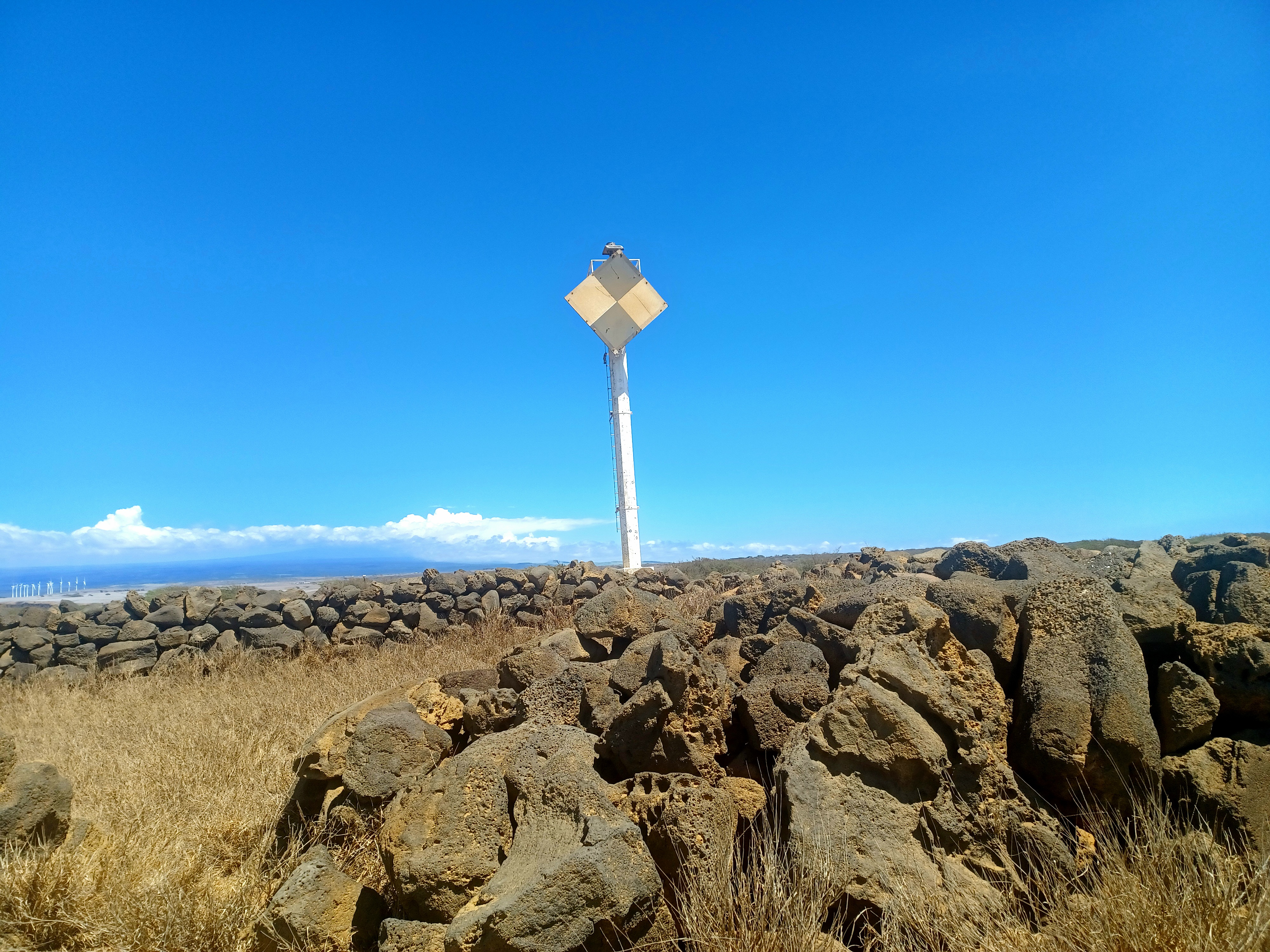
South Point navigational marker

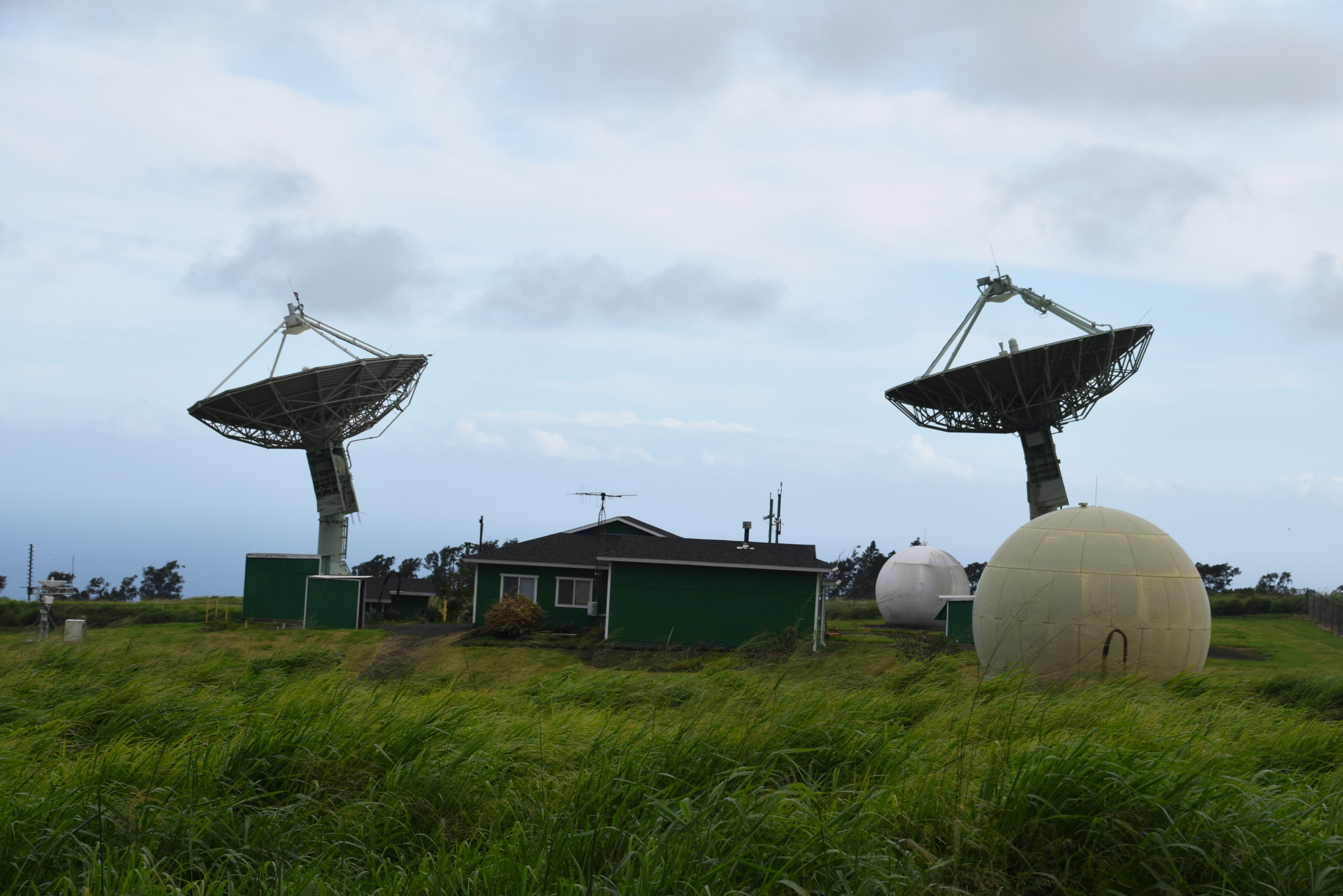
South Point Satellite Station

During World War II, the US Air Force built a landing strip called Morse Field on the point. The airfield was closed in 1953. In 1961 South Point was on the list of final sites to be considered by NASA to launch crewed rockets to space, but was considered too remote although it was later used to launch sounding rockets for testing of instruments at the Air Force's Maui Space Surveillance Center. The low latitude of the location also made it (and nearby areas that are as remote) attractive as a site for private rocket launches, but these plans were dropped in the face of high costs and local opposition.

A space tracking station was operated from 1964 to 1965, and in the 21st century the Swedish Space Corporation's Universal Space Network again established a remote ground station for space tracking and communications, now consisting of two 13-meter parabolic antennas on the east side of South Point Road. Also at Ka Lae are the large shortwave radio antennas of World Harvest Radio International, which used callsign KWHR until 2009.

In 1987 the Kamaoa Wind Farm began operation with thirty-seven Mitsubishi 250 kW wind turbines with an operationally typical total peak output of 7.5 MW. By 2006 the turbines at 18°59′33″N 155°40′5″W were falling into disrepair, and they were finally shut down on August 15, 2006. At the end of August 2006, components for a new set of wind turbines were transported to South Point. The Pakini Nui project consists of 14 General Electric wind turbines constructed at 18°58′20″N 155°41′21″W, about 1.5 miles (2.4 km) from the old Kamaoa wind farm. Completed in April 2007, Pakini Nui supplies up to 20.5 MW of power to the island electricity grid of Hawaii Electric Light Company. The wind farm is operated by Tawhiri Power, LLC. It is the southernmost wind farm in the United States. The turbines of the old wind farm have been disassembled.

== Southernmost point ==
Ka Lae Point is the southernmost point of all fifty states in the United States, but technically it is not the southernmost point in the United States. The southernmost point of all U.S. territory is Rose Atoll, American Samoa. However, Palmyra Atoll contains the southernmost point of all 'incorporated' U.S. territory, according to the doctrine of "incorporation" defined in the Supreme Court's Insular Cases. Palmyra's south point on Holei Island at 5°52'15" N latitude is officially the southernmost point of all incorporated territory of the United States of America.

== See also ==
- Great Pacific Garbage Patch
