= Kamuela Airport (closed 1953) =

- IATA: none; ICAO: none

Summary
- Airport type: Defunct
- Serves: Kamuela, Hawaii
- Opened: 1944
- Closed: August 1953
- Coordinates: 20°00′16″N 155°40′58″W

Map
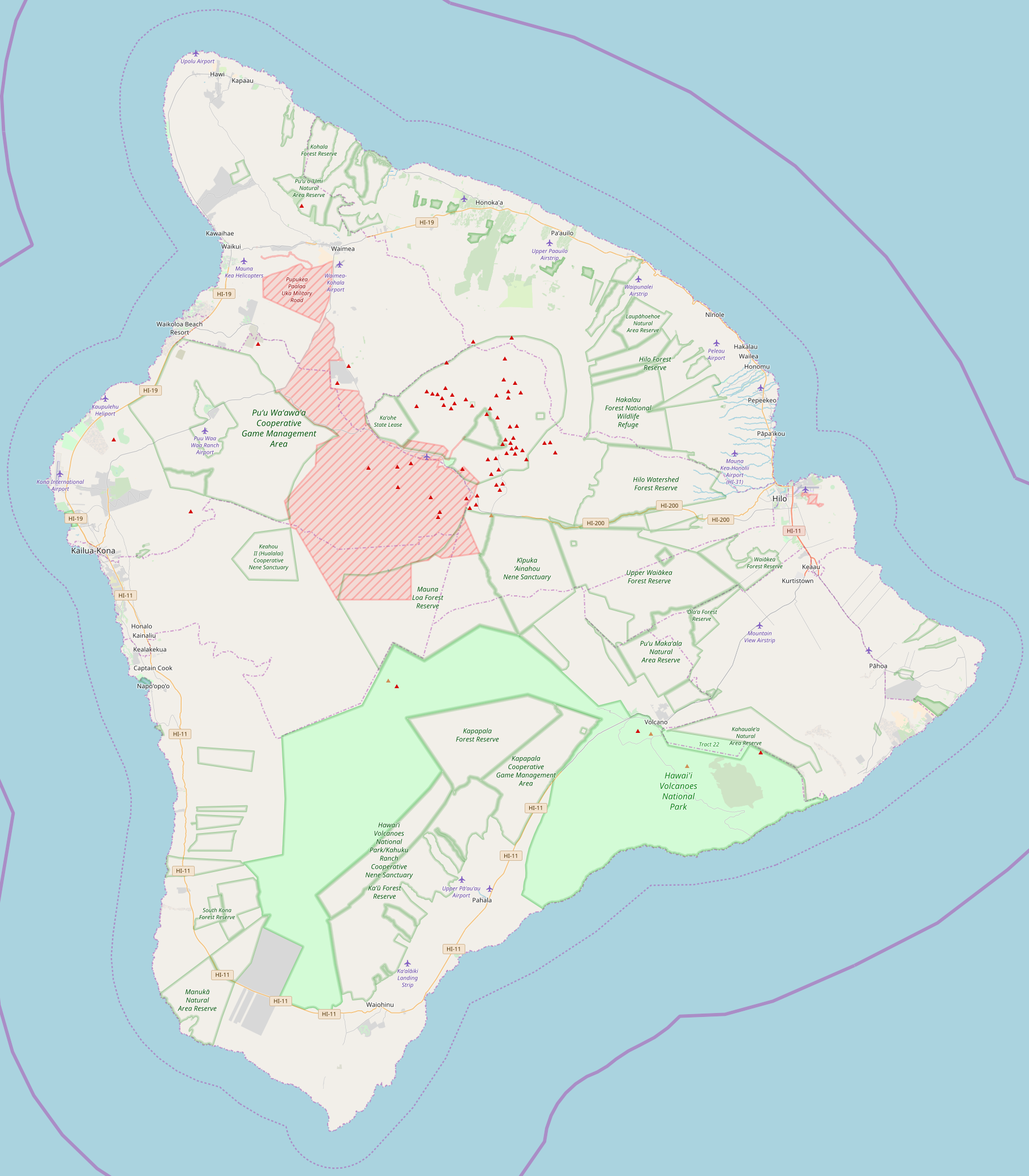
- Location of airport in Hawaii Kamuela Airport (Hawaii)

Runways
Direction	Length		Surface
Direction	ft	m	Surface
West/East	3,000	914	Oiled

Kamuela Airport, also known as Bordelon Field or MCAS Bordelon, is a closed airport that served the Waimea Region from 1949 until 1953, when it was replaced by the current Waimea–Kohala Airport. It is located in Waimea, Hawaii County, Hawaii.

== History ==
In 1943, a liaison field was established in Camp Tarawa. The airfield was graded and had a 3,000-feet long oiled airstrip. The field was named after William James Bordelon, a United States Marines who led an assault on enemy forces and rescued fellow marines during the Battle of Tarawa. He was posthumously awarded the Medal of Honor, becoming the first U.S. Marine from Texas to receive the award for an action in World War II. It handled observation aircraft, and was primarily used to support training and suit Camp Tarawa's transportation needs. Between August and September 1943, the field was used to receive the 28th Marines and parts of the 13th Marines posted at Camp Tarawa. After the war in 1946, Bordelon Field was deactivated and its buildings were sold, with the land being returned to the Parker Range.

In 1947, the Department of Public Works Airport Division proposed the development of Kamuela Airport, which was to service the Waimea district after the war. Bordelon Field was later renamed to Kamuela Airport under Act 32 of the 1947 Legislature, effective July 1, 1947. The airstrip was leased from the Parker Ranch by the Hawaii Aeronautics Commission, and appropriated $60,000 for the development. However, the need to extend the runway for the usage of Douglas DC-3 aircraft required several hundred thousand dollars. Engineering studies were also made to determine the most economical method for the field to be constructed, which could conform to scheduled airline operating requirements. In 1949, the legislature appropriated $200,000 for paving, grading, and other improvements.

=== Civilian usage ===
Following the Kamuela Airport's construction, the local community was satisfied due to the convenience of travel and transportation of local produce. In July 1950, the HAC approved $58,000 to be used for repairs. They also agreed to extend the lease of Kamuela Airport, which begun on November 4, 1950. Afterwards, the HAC also approved repairs for the runway. In the same year, the airport was found to be unsuitable for further modern development, and terrain and weather studies were conducted to determine a suitable site for a new airport. On December 22, 1950, repairs were completed and the airport was reopened. In January 1951, the runway was widened by 16 feet and fully resurfaced, which cost $17,198. Cockett Airlines also began renting office space at a rate of one dollar per square foot per annum. On October 22, 1951, the HAC approved a sum of $728,000 for the development and construction of a new runway at the new airport. By the early 1950s, Kamuela Airport scheduled daily (except Sunday) freight and non-scheduled passenger services. However, the airport was unable to support and service scheduled passenger services. Routine maintenance and custodial duties were performed by one full time HAC employee. In August 1953, Kamuela Airport was finally closed after construction at the new airport was completed.

The June 1971 Hawaiian Islands Sectional Chart also stopped including the old airport. Since its closure, the old airport's runway remained intact, aside from the construction of a building on the eastern end.

== See also ==
- Morse Field, another World War II airfield in Hawaii.
- Waimea-Kohala Airport, the newer airport which replaced Kamuela Airport.
