= Hilina Slump =

Subsided section of the Big Island of Hawaii

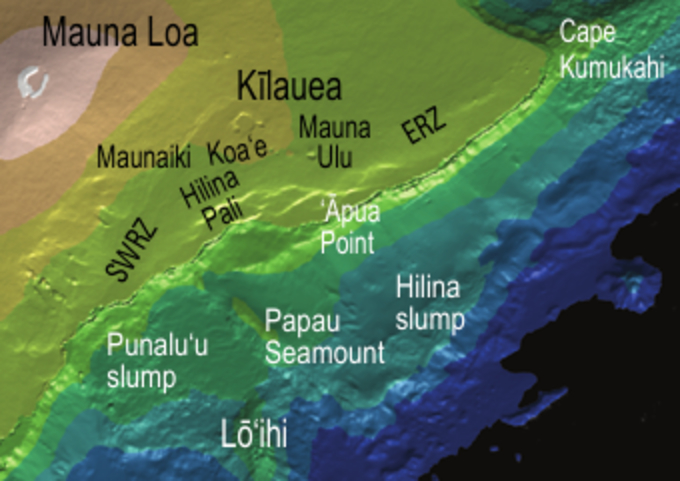
The Hilina Slump, on the flank of the Kīlauea Volcano on the southeast side of the island of Hawaii, extends from the Hilina fault zone approximately south of the East Rift Zone (ERZ) to the edge of deep water.

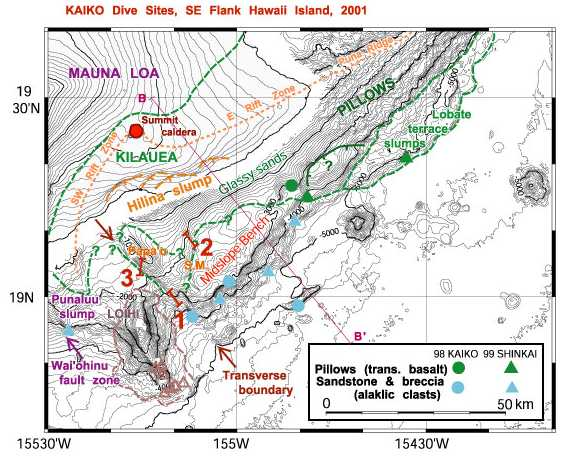
Details of the Hilina Slump.

The Hilina Slump, on the south flank of the Kīlauea Volcano on the southeast coast of the Big Island of Hawaiʻi, is the most notable of several landslides that ring each of the Hawaiian Islands. These landslides are the means by which material deposited at a volcano's vents are transferred downward and seaward, eventually spilling onto the seabed to broaden the island.

Kīlauea's entire south flank, extending out to Cape Kumukahi, is currently sliding seaward, with some parts of the central portion (overlooking the Hilina slump) moving as much as 10 centimeters (3.9 inches) per year, pushed by the forceful injection of magma and pulled by gravity.

Current movement of the Hilina slump and recent volcanic activity, coupled with evidence of massive submarine slides in the geological past, has led to claims that megatsunamis might result if the south flank of Kīlauea should suddenly fail.

== Geology ==
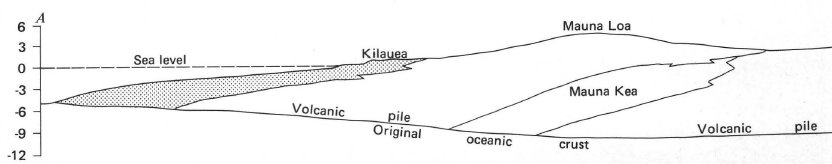
Simplified cross-section through the Kīlauea (gray) and Mauna Loa volcanoes (and edge of Mauna Kea), showing 1) how each volcano lies on the flank of the older volcanoes, and 2) the low-angle slopes typical of shield volcanoes. Elevation in kilometers, with no vertical exaggeration. The dip below the letter "K" corresponds to the view shown below.

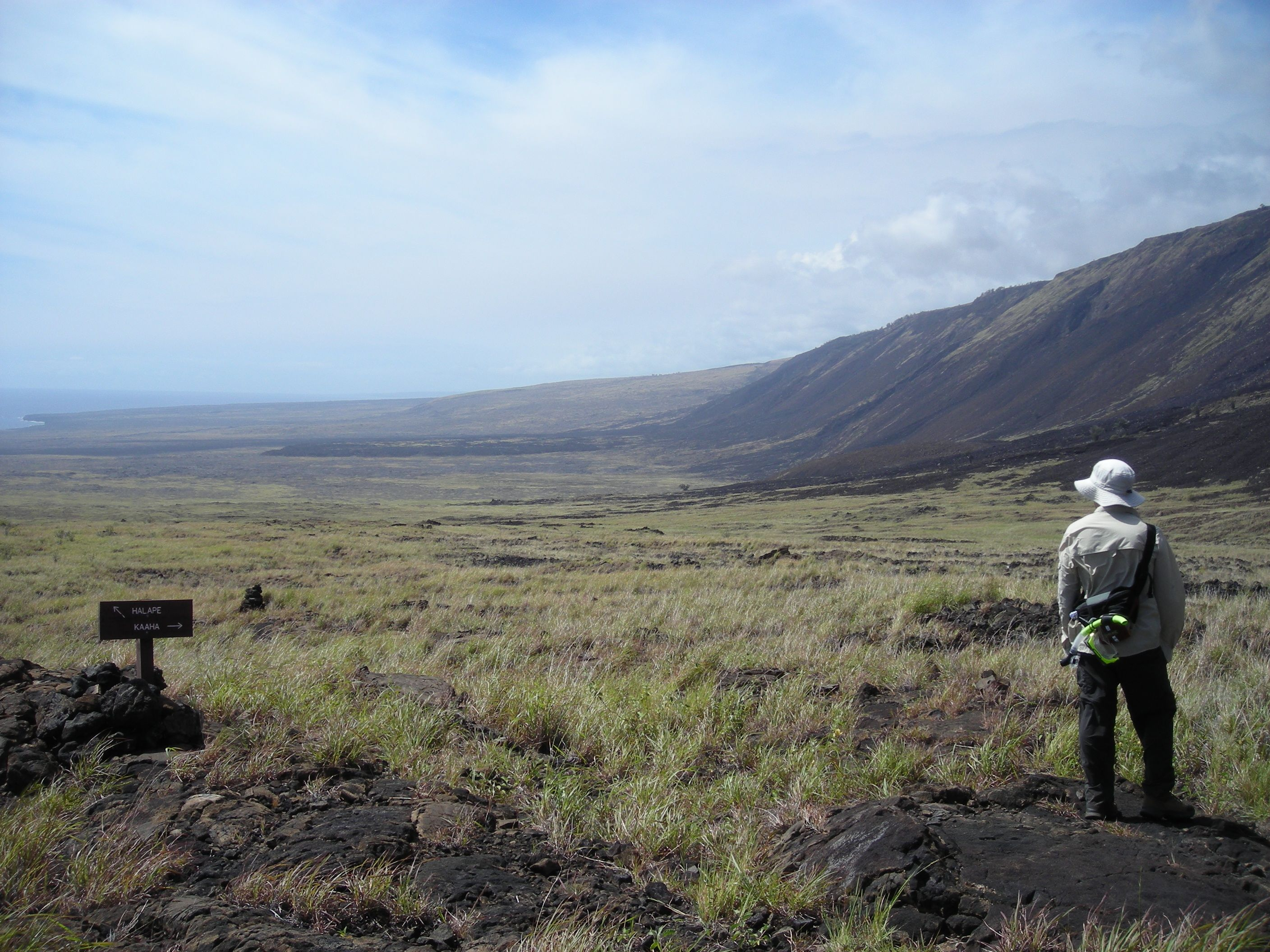
The Hilina Pali (cliff) on Kīlauea Volcano's south flank is visible evidence of the steep Hilina Fault System. Beneath this system lies the flat-lying detachment fault that has no visible surface expression, but has produced several large earthquakes in the past 200 years.

The Hawaiian Islands are volcanoes, the newest part of the Hawaiian-Emperor seamount chain, created by eruption of magma from the Hawaiʻi hotspot. As the Pacific plate, moving to the northwest, carries the existing volcanoes away from the hotspot, new volcanoes form at the southeastern end. The newest and largest island is the Big Island of Hawaiʻi, formed by the merger of seven volcanoes. The largest, at the trailing edge of the island, is Mauna Loa Volcano, and on its seaward flank is the younger Kīlauea, with the still submerged Kamaʻehuakanaloa Seamount (formerly Lōʻihi) just off-shore.

The Hawaiian volcanoes are shield volcanoes, distinguished from the more familiar stratovolcanoes by their greater breadth and lower gradient slopes. (E.g.: Kilauea's average slope to the east is only 3.3°, and the south slope from the summit to the ocean floor averages only 6°.) When the volcano is over the hotspot a plentiful supply of magma allows it to build a broad shield; when it loses its supply of magma it dies and is eroded back to sea level.

Like the rest, Kīlauea is composed of alternating subaerial and submarine lava flows fractured by cooling joints and interbedded with weaker rock, sediments, and tephra, resulting in what has been characterized as a fractured rock mass. These discontinuities form zones of weakness that lead to slope failure. The weight of the rock mass causes extension (stretching) downhill, favoring the formation of vertical structures, such as dip-slip faults and rift zones, parallel to the slope. These disconnect the rock mass from the upper flank, putting more stress on any non-vertical planes of weakness, which may fail and form a slip zone.

In their 1999 paper, Smith and Malahoff discussed "magma-jacking" as a major cause of slope failure for the Hilina Slump. Magma jacking occurs when fresh magma is injected into pre-existing fractures or weak rock. The pressure of the injected magma serves to break apart the rock, leading to slope failure. Smith and Malahoff also proposed that Kīlauea's status as a secondary volcanic structure on the flanks of the larger Mauna Loa makes it more susceptible to catastrophic collapse. They observed that this trend holds true for many of the historic landslides observed in the Hawaiian island chain.

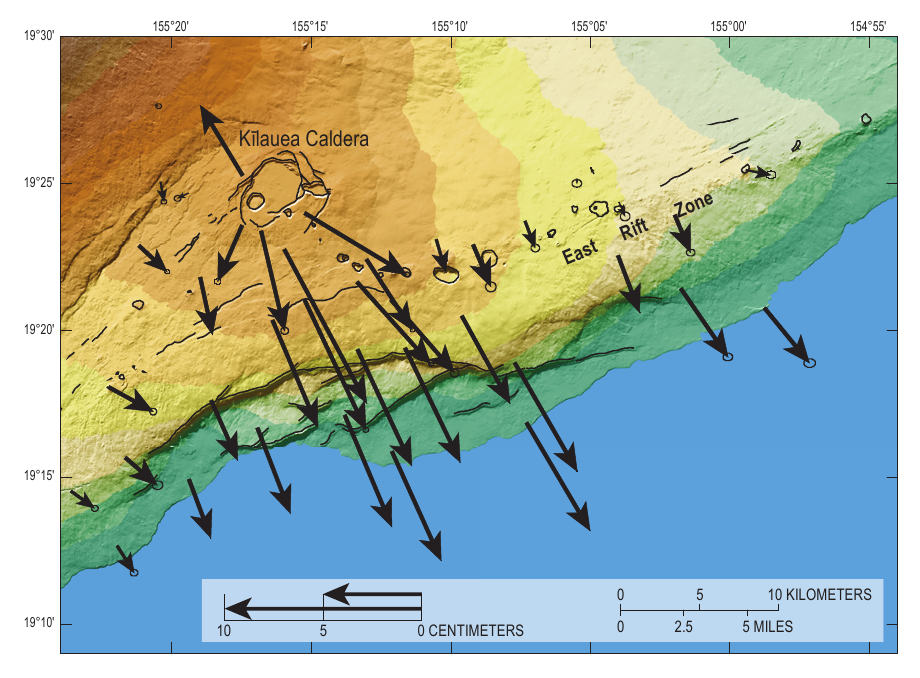
Vectors showing the amount and direction of movement of Global Positioning System stations at various places on the south flank of Kīlauea, 2003 through 2006, relative to the rest of the island. Measurements for other years are very similar. The dark bands are the cliffs of the Hilina Pali.

On Kīlauea's seaward flank (where it is not resting against Mauna Loa) these tendencies are evident where magma oozing out of the caldera turns east and west to form the Southwest Rift Zone (SWRZ) and East Rift Zone (ERZ), both parallel to the shore, and also in the cliffs of the Hilina Pali – coincident with dip-slip faults of the Hilina fault system – which form the head-scarp where a large block of rock has slumped down and outward.

The rift zones enable transport of lava tens of kilometers away from the caldera (as seen in the 2018 lower Puna eruption). They also serve as wedges, forcing the south flank of Kīlauea downslope across a décollement – a nearly horizontal fault where the volcanic deposits rest on the oceanic crust – about 8 to 10 km deep. The combination of rifting and gravitationally driven slumping results in seaward movement of the entire south flank (see image), especially around the Hilina Pali, with seaward motions of up to 10 centimeters (3.9 inches) per year.

=== Hilina Slump ===
On the central portion of the south flank of Kīlauea the thousand-foot high cliffs of the Hilina Pali and similar scarps were recognized as early as 1930 as headscarps resulting from slumping of the coast. The Hilina Pali is the headscarp of the Hilina Slump, a type of landslide where a large and relatively intact block slips along a concave surface, dropping vertically at the head, with the toe often extending upward as well as outward. The Hilina Slump extends seaward from both ends of the Hilina Pali out to a depth of 5,000 meters (16,404 ft). Whether this slump is shallow, or reaches down to the décollement that underlies the entire Kīlauea south flank, is still under debate.

With the discovery in the late 1980s that the entire south flank of Kīlauea is involved with submarine landslides the term "Hilina slump" has been applied by some scientists to the broader area.

The Hilina slump is sliding seaward on top of the southern flank of the Kīlauea volcano, at an average speed of 10 cm/year (3.9 in/year). Kīlauea is the southeastern portion, about 13.7%, of the Big Island of Hawaii. Compared to the 25,000 to 35,000 cubic kilometers (6,000 to 8,400 cu mi) volume of Kīlauea, the submarine slide is between 10,000 and 12,000 cubic kilometers (2,400 and 2,900 cu mi), making up about 10% of the island. Model results based on present day slope and sea level suggest that earthquake accelerations stronger than about 0.4 to 0.6 g are enough to exceed the static friction coefficient resulting in a slip along a failure surface. However, recent undersea measurements show that an undersea "bench" has formed a buttress at the forefront of the Hilina Slump, and "this buttress may tend to reduce the likelihood of future catastrophic detachment."

== Earthquakes ==
Kīlauea earthquakes

Earthquakes in Hawaiʻi result from either movement of magma, or sliding of the volcanic edifices which comprise the islands. Some of the seaward slippage of the flank occurs aseismically, without noticeable earthquakes. At other times there is a lurch, resulting in an earthquake of magnitude 6 or greater.

=== 1868 ===
An earthquake on April 2, 1868, rocked the southeast coast of Hawaiʻi with a magnitude estimated between 7.25 and 7.75. It triggered a landslide on the slopes of the Mauna Loa volcano, five miles (8.0 km) north of Pāhala, killing 31 people. A tsunami claimed 46 additional lives. The villages of Punaluʻu, Nīnole, Kāwāʻa, Honuʻapo, and Keauhou Landing were severely damaged. According to one account, the tsunami "rolled in over the tops of the coconut trees, probably 60 feet (18 m) high ... inland a distance of a quarter of a mile [0.4 km] in some places, taking out to sea when it returned, houses, men, women, and almost everything movable."

=== 1975 ===
Hilina Slump
- UTC time: 1975-11-29 14:47:40
- ISC event: 722344
- USGS-ANSS: ComCat
- Local date: November 29, 1975
- Local time: 04:47 HST
- Magnitude: M_{w} 7.7
- Depth: 9 km (5.6 mi)
- Epicenter: 19.333°N 155.002°W

A similar earthquake occurred November 29, 1975, with a magnitude of 7.2. A 40-mile-wide (64 km) section of the Hilina Slump slid 11 feet (3.4 m) into the ocean, widening the crack by 26 ft (7.9 m). This movement also caused a tsunami that reached a maximum height of 47.0 feet (14.3 m) at Keauhou Landing. Oceanfront properties were washed off their foundations in Punaluʻu. Two deaths were reported at Halape, and 19 other persons were injured. The shoreline at Keauhou Bay was dramatically altered.

=== 2018 ===
Hilina Slump
- UTC time: 2018-05-04 22:32:55
- ISC event: 611928827
- USGS-ANSS: ComCat
- Local date: May 4, 2018
- Local time: 12:33 p.m. HST
- Magnitude: 6.9 M_{ww}
- Depth: 2.1 km (1.3 mi)
- Epicenter: 19.313°N 154.998°W

A magnitude 6.9 earthquake on May 4, 2018 resulted in the slump moving about 2 feet (0.6 m). It appears to have been precipitated by vibrations caused by the movement of magma in the eastern rift zone of Kīlauea, and in turn, the earthquake preceded further volcanic activity. This could fit into a model of correlation between earthquakes and eruption events described for the earthquakes in 1868 and 1975.

== Landslides ==
The breadth and gentle slopes of young shield volcanoes such as Kīlauea are in contrast to the steep, picturesque cliffs (pali), deeply incised canyons, and narrow ridges typical of the older islands, and for a long while it was a bit of mystery how the latter got that way. In 1930 it was suggested that (at least in some cases) this might be the result of large landslides. In 1964 it was noted that certain areas of sea floor with very blocky topography lay downslope from what appear to be giant amphitheaters (the large bowl left at the head of landslides), suggesting the possibility of giant landslides. However, that such mass wasting was a ubiquitous feature of Hawaiian geology was not recognized until systematic mapping of the sea floor in the late 1980s identified 17 areas on the flanks of the islands that appear to be the remnants of large landslides. Some aspects of these slides – such as the large volume (estimated at 5,000 cubic kilometers (1,200 cu mi) for the Nuuanu slide), the transport of large ("tens of kilometers" in size) blocks 50 kilometers (31 mi) or more, and evidence of rapid transport – suggests that some of these slides were, indeed, gigantic, and could have generated giant tsunamis. One of these areas is the south flank of Kīlauea, including the Hilina Slump, which is currently in motion. This has raised concern that failure of the south flank of Kīlauea could generate a tsunami that "may threaten cities in the Pacific region", and that even relatively minor displacement of the Hilina Slump "would be truly disastrous to life and property on Hawaii island, the rest of the archipelago, and possibly the Pacific Rim."

While the Hawaiian archipelago faces a significant threat from even relatively minor local events, the threat to other trans-Pacific regions has been deemed "exaggerated". Particularly, the larger, more powerful, and more dramatic landslides seen around the Hawaiian Islands are a type of landslide called debris avalanches, where the material in the slide has broken up into pieces small enough to flow as a relatively narrow – typically less than 50 kilometers (31 mi) wide – fast-moving stream that can run out as far as 230 kilometers (140 mi). Debris avalanches, or flows, "commonly represent a single episode of rapid failure", where the potential energy of the slide is released suddenly, and could cause giant tsunamis. On the other hand, slumps are largely intact and undeformed blocks that are wider – up to 110 kilometers (68 mi) – and thicker – about 10 kilometers (6.2 mi) – than debris avalanches, and generally slow moving. Slumps commonly move on a concave surface, with the head dropping down almost vertically (as seen at the Hilina Pali and related cliffs), and the toe thrusting upward.

Seaward movement of Kīlauea's flank has been largely halted on the western end by the Kamaʻehuakanaloa and Papaʻu seamounts, and slowed east of the Hilina Slump by the Hohonu Seamount. Additional buttressing of Hilina Slump is provided by a "Midslope Bench" (see detailed map above); catastrophic detachment of this landslide is deemed unlikely, and "dire predictions of the future breakaway of the Hilina slump ... may be overstated".

== Megatsunamis ==
Coupled with the knowledge that the Hawaiian islands are ringed with debris fans where large portions of the various volcanoes have slid into the sea – the volume of the Hilina slump has been estimated at 10,000 to 12,000 cubic kilometers (2,400 to 2,900 cu mi) – it seems reasonable to consider the risk of volcanic and seismic activity in Hawaiʻi wreaking havoc around the Pacific Rim.

Pararas-Carayannis concluded that neither geology nor historic events indicate that Kīlauea's southern flank is "unusually unstable or that a massive collapse is possible in the foreseeable future", but even if such a collapse happened as postulated, the far-field effects of the resultant tsunami "have been greatly overstated".

== See also ==
- Geology of Hawaii
- Evolution of Hawaiian volcanoes
- Nuʻuanu Slide

== Sources ==
- Atlantic and Gulf of Mexico Tsunami Hazard Assessment Group (2008), Evaluation of Tsunami Sources with the Potential to Impact the U.S. Atlantic and Gulf Coasts: An Updated Report to the Nuclear Regulatory Commission (PDF), United States Geological Survey
- Brooks, Benjamin A.; Foster, James H.; Bevis, Michael; Frazer, L. Neil; Wolfe, Cecily J.; Behn, Mark (2006), "Periodic slow earthquakes on the flank of Kīlaue volcano, Hawai'i", Earth and Planetary Science Letters, 246 (3–4): 207–216, Bibcode:2006E&PSL.246..207B, doi:10.1016/j.epsl.2006.03.035, S2CID 31863578.
- Clague, Dennis A.; Sherrod, David R. (2014), Poland, Michael P.; Takahasi, Taeko Jane; Landowski, Claire M. (eds.), "Characteristics of Hawaiian volcanoes", USGS Report, U.S. Geological Survey Professional Papers: Professional Paper 1801, United States Geological Survey: 97–146, Bibcode:2014usgs.rept....1P, doi:10.3133/pp1801, ISSN 2330-7102.
- Cannon, Eric C.; Bürgmann, Roland (March 10, 2001), "Prehistoric fault offsets of the Hilina fault system, south flank of Kilauea Volcano, Hawaii", Journal of Geophysical Research: Solid Earth, 106 (B3): 4207–4219, Bibcode:2001JGR...106.4207C, doi:10.1029/2000JB900412.
- Denlinger, Roger P.; Morgan, Julia K. (2014). "Chapter 4: Instability of Hawaiian Volcanoes" (PDF). In Poland, Michael P.; Takahashi, Taeko Jane; Landowski, Claire M. (eds.). Characteristics of Hawaiian volcanoes. Professional Paper 1801. United States Geological Survey. doi:10.3133/pp18014. ISSN 2330-7102..
- Facts on the stability of Kilauea's south flank, past and present, Hawaiian Volcano Observatory, May 14, 2018, archived from the original on May 16, 2018.
- Hills, Denise J.; Morgan, Julia K.; Moore, Gregory F.; Leslie, Stephen C. (January 2002). "Structural variability along the submarine south flank of Kilauea Volcano, Hawai'i: from a multichannel seismic reflection survey". In Takahashi, Eiichi; Lipman, Peter W.; Garcia, Micheal O.; Naka, Jiro; Aramaki, Shigeo (eds.). Hawaiian Volcanoes: Deep Underwater Perspectives. AGU Geophysical Monograph. Vol. 128. pp. 333–346. Bibcode:2002GMS...128..105H. doi:10.1029/GM128p0105. ISBN 9781118668436..
- Kauahikaua, James P.; Tilling, Robert I. (2014). "Chapter 10: Natural Hazards and Risk Reduction in Hawaiʻi" (PDF). In Poland, Michael P.; Takahashi, Taeko Jane; Landowski, Claire M. (eds.). Characteristics of Hawaiian volcanoes. Professional Paper 1801. United States Geological Survey. ISSN 2330-7102..
- Lipman, Peter W.; Lockwood, John P.; Okamura, Reginald T.; Swanson, Donald A.; Yamashita, Kenneth M. (1985), Ground deformation associated with the 1975 magnitude 7.2 earthquake and resulting changes in activity of Kilauea volcano, Hawaii (PDF), Professional Paper 1276, United States Geological Survey.
- Mader, Charles L. (2001), "Modeling the La Palma landslide tsunami", Science of Tsunami Hazards, 19 (3): 150–170.
- Miklius, Asta; Cervelli, Peter; Sako, Maurice; Lisowski, Michael; Owen, Susan; Segal, Paul; Foster, James; Kamibayashi, Kevan; Brooks, Brooks (2005), Global positioning system measurements on the island of Hawai'i: 1997 through 2004 (PDF), Open-File Report 2005-1425.
- Moore, James G. (1964), "Giant submarine landslides on the Hawaiian Ridge" (PDF), Geological Survey Research 1964, Chapter D, Professional Paper 501-D, United States Geological Survey, pp. D95–D98.
- Moore, James G.; Clague, David A. (November 1992), "Volcano growth and evolution of the island of Hawaii", Bulletin of the Geological Society of America, 104 (11): 1471–1484, Bibcode:1992GSAB..104.1471M, doi:10.1130/0016-7606(1992)104<1471:VGAEOT>2.3.CO;2.
- Moore, J. G.; Clague, D. A.; Holcomb, R. T.; Lipman, P. W.; Normark, W. R.; Torresan, M. E. (December 10, 1989), "Prodigious submarine landslides on the Hawaiian Ridge" (PDF), Journal of Geophysical Research: Solid Earth, 94 (B12): 17465–17484, Bibcode:1989JGR....9417465M, doi:10.1029/jb094ib12p17465.
- Moore, James G.; Krivoy, Harold L. (May 15, 1964), "The 1962 flank eruption of Kilauea Volcano and structure of the east rift zone", Journal of Geophysical Research, 69 (10): 2033–2045, Bibcode:1964JGR....69.2033M, doi:10.1029/JZ069i010p02033.
- Moore, James G.; Mark, Robert K. (December 1992), "Morphology of the Island of Hawaii" (PDF), GSA Today, 2 (12): 257–262, ISSN 1052-5173.
- Morgan, J. K.; Moore, G. F.; Clague, D. A. (2003), "Slope failure and volcanic spreading along the submarine south flank of Kilauea volcano, Hawaii", Journal of Geophysical Research: Solid Earth, 108 (B9), John Wiley & Sons: 2415, Bibcode:2003JGRB..108.2415M, doi:10.1029/2003JB002411.
- Moore, James G; Normark, William R; Holcomb, Robin T (1994), "Giant Hawaiian underwater landslides", Science, 264 (5155): 46–47, Bibcode:1994Sci...264...46M, doi:10.1126/science.264.5155.46, PMID 17778132.
- National Geophysical Data Center. "Tsunami runups". Archived from the original on September 30, 2006..
- Normark, William R.; Moore, James G; Torresan, M. E. (1993), "Giant volcano-related landslides and the development of the Hawaiian Islands" (PDF), in Schwab, William C.; Lee, Homa J.; Twichell, David C. (eds.), Submarine Landslides: Selected Studies in the U.S. Exclusive Economic Zone, United States Geological Survey, pp. 184–196.
- Nunn, Patrick D. (2009), Vanished Islands and Hidden Continents of the Pacific, University of Hawaii Press, ISBN 978-0-8248-3219-3.
- Okubo, C. H. (2004), "Rock mass strength and slope stability of the Hilina slump, Kilauea Volcano, Hawaiʻi" (PDF), Journal of Volcanology and Geothermal Research, 138 (1–2), Elsevier: 43–76, Bibcode:2004JVGR..138...43O, doi:10.1016/j.jvolgeores.2004.06.006.
- Owen, Susan; Segall, Paul; Freymueller, Jeff; Miklius, Asta; Denlinger, Roger; Árnadóttir, Thóra; Sako, Maurice; Bürgmann, Roland (1995), "Rapid Deformation of the South Flank of Kilauea Volcano, Hawaii", Science, 267 (5202), American Association for the Advancement of Science: 1328–1332, Bibcode:1995Sci...267.1328O, doi:10.1126/science.267.5202.1328, PMID 17812606, S2CID 30320632.
- Owen, Susan; Segall, Paul; Lisowski, Micheal; Miklius, Asta; Denlinger, Roger; Sako, Maurice (2000), "Rapid deformation of Kilauea Volcano: Global Positioning System measurements between 1990 and 1996", Journal of Geophysical Research: Solid Earth, 105 (B8): 18983–18998, Bibcode:2000JGR...10518983O, doi:10.1029/2000JB900109, S2CID 36578563.
- Pararas-Carayannis, George (2002), "Evaluation of the Threat of Mega Tsunami Generation from Postulated Massive Slope Failure of Island Stratovolcanoes on La Palma, Canary Islands, and on the Island of Hawaii" (PDF), The International Journal of the Tsunami Society, 20 (5): 251–277.
- Robinson, Joel E.; Eakins, Barry W.; Kanamatsu, Toshiya; Naka, Jiro; Takahashi, Eiichi; Satake, Kenji; Smith, John R.; Clague, David A.; Yokose, Hisayoshi (2006), JAMSTEC multibeam surveys and submersible dives around the Hawaiian Islands: A collaborative Japan-USA exploration of Hawaii's deep seafloor, U.S. Geological Survey Data Series, vol. 171.
- A Slow Emergency and a Sudden Slump, Berkeley Seismology Lab, May 7, 2018.
- Smith, J. R.; Malahoff, A.; Shor, A. N. (1999), "Submarine geology of the Hilina Slump and morpho-structural evolution of Kilauea Volcano, Hawaii", Journal of Volcanology and Geothermal Research, 94 (1–4), Elsevier: 59–88, Bibcode:1999JVGR...94...59S, doi:10.1016/s0377-0273(99)00098-0.
- Stearns, Harold T.; Clark, William O. (1930), Geology and water resources of the Kau District, Hawaii (PDF), Water-Supply Paper 616, United States Geological Survey.
- Swanson, Donald A.; Duffield, Wendell A.; Fiske, Richard S. (1976), Displacement of the south flank of Kilauea volcano: the result of forceful intrusion of magma into the rift zones (PDF), Professional Paper 963, United States Geological Survey.
- Tilling, Robert I.; Kauahikaua, James P.; Brantley, StevenR.; Neal, Christina A. (2014). "Chapter 1: The Hawaiian Volcano Observatory–A Natural Laboratory for Studying Basaltic Volcanism" (PDF). In Poland, Michael P.; Takahashi, Taeko Jane; Landowski, Claire M. (eds.). Characteristics of Hawaiian volcanoes. Professional Paper 1801. United States Geological Survey. ISSN 2330-7102..
- Thompson, Nick; Watters, Robert J.; Schiffman, Peter (2008), "Stability analysis of Hawaiian Island flanks using insight gained from strength testing of the HSDP core", Journal of Volcanology and Geothermal Research, 171 (3–4): 163–177, Bibcode:2008JVGR..171..163T, CiteSeerX 10.1.1.613.1557, doi:10.1016/j.jvolgeores.2007.11.008.
- Varnes, David J. (1978), "Chapter 2: Slope movement types and processes" (PDF), in Schuser, R. L.; Krizek, R. J. (eds.), Landslides, Analysis and Control, Special Report 176, National Academy of Sciences, pp. 11–33.
- Ward, Steven N. (June 10, 2001), "Landslide Tsunami", Journal of Geophysical Research: Solid Earth, 106 (6): 11, 201–11, 215, Bibcode:2001JGR...10611201W, doi:10.1029/2000JB900450, S2CID 53867250.
- Ward, Steven N.; Day, Simon (2001), "Cumbre Vieja Volcano – potential collapse and tsunami at La Palma, Canary Islands" (PDF), Geophysical Research Letters, 28 (17): 3397–3400, Bibcode:2001GeoRL..28.3397W, doi:10.1029/2001gl013110.
