= 1871 Lānaʻi earthquake =

Earthquake in the Hawaiian Islands

- Location within Hawaii
- UTC time: 1871-02-20 08:45:00
- USGS-ANSS: ComCat
- Local date: 19 February 1871
- Local time: 22:11 HST
- Magnitude: 7.5 M_{w}
- Epicenter: 20.7°N 156.0°W
- Type: Unknown
- Areas affected: Hawaii
- Total damage: Moderate
- Max. intensity: MMI VIII (Severe) – MMI XI (Extreme)
- Tsunami: Uncertain
- Landslides: Yes
- Aftershocks: Yes

An earthquake struck near the Hawaiian island of Lanai on February 19, 1871, at 10:11 pm HST with an estimated magnitude of 7.5 on the moment magnitude scale (M_{w}). It remains one of the largest seismic events to hit the Hawaiian Islands since the 1868 Kaʻū earthquake, with its effects being felt throughout the entire archipelago. It caused severe damage on the islands of Lanai, Molokai and Maui. A tsunami may have been generated however there are speculations if it had actually happened. Despite the size of the quake and the extent of damage, there were no deaths.

== Tectonic setting ==
The Hawaiian Islands are situated in the middle of the Pacific plate, far from any known plate boundary, where most of the world's earthquakes occur. This island chain is a product of hotspot volcanism where magma is able to make its way up to the crust and onto the surface, creating volcanoes. Hawaiʻi is the youngest volcanic island and marks where the hotspot is currently located.

== Earthquake ==
Modelling of an earthquake along a fault with a dimension of 73 km (45 mi) by 41 km (25 mi) and an average slip of 1.7 m (5 ft 7 in) corresponds to a moment magnitude (M_{w}) of 7.5. The estimated M_{w} 7.5 earthquake is the third-largest to occur in the Kingdom of Hawaii, behind the 1868 and 1975 events. It is also the largest to occur northwest of the Hawaii (Big Island). Previous studies estimated the magnitude to be ~7.0 and based on felt reports, M_{I} 6.8.

The most likely source of this event is the Molokai fracture zone, a structure in the Pacific Ocean seafloor that separates 85 million-year-old and 100 million-year-old oceanic lithosphere. It runs through the island chain near Lanai and Maui. Along this part of the fracture zone, stress due to the weight of the Hawaiian Islands may have resulted in slippage along with the structure. Faulting likely occurred at a deep depth, in the lower oceanic lithosphere basement and mantle. The same seismic zone is suspected to have produced an M_{w} 6.8 earthquake in 1938 near Maui.

=== Tsunami ===
A tsunami was thought to have accompanied the earthquake shortly after, as mentioned in several local newspapers and reports. This claim however, is doubtful as documentations were vague and other eyewitnesses along the shores did not witness any large waves.

== Impact ==
MMI by location
MMI	Locations
MMI VIII (Severe)–MMI XI (Extreme)	Maui, Lanai, Molokai
MMI VII (Very strong)–MMI VI (Strong)	Oahu, Hawaiʻi,
MMI V (Moderate)–MMI IV (Light)	Kauai, Niihau

=== Lanai ===
The earthquake reportedly lasted 55 seconds to a minute with shaking directed in a northeast–southwest motion. The most extreme shaking was felt on the islands of Maui and Lanai where the values on the Mercalli intensity scale ranged from VIII–XI (Severe–Extreme). There, fractures formed along the slopes, and rocks that broke off from peaks collapsed. Between Manele Bay and Kamaiki Point, Pali Kaholo; a well-known cliff collapsed into the ocean. Shaking on the island was stronger than during the 1868 earthquake.

=== Maui ===
In Lahaina, almost every adobe and brick building was destroyed. A mission church sustained cracks in its walls. The courthouse and a stone building were also damaged. It was reported that every fence and wall fell towards the north. At the pier, a crack 14.6 meters long appeared.

=== Oahu ===
In Oahu, the earthquake cracked walls and split two houses. In Ewa, the belfry of a Catholic church supported by cast-iron pillars was completely destroyed. In Waianae, ground fissures and land slumps were widely reported. Some landslides and rockfalls resulted in road blockage. Plasters on homes, offices, and a courthouse fell down in Honolulu. In addition, chimneys at the Punahou School in Honolulu were also knocked off.

On the Mercalli intensity scale, the earthquake's intensity was likely VI (Strong), and it lasted some 30–45 seconds. The quake caused panic and hysteria, some residents fainted while others began praying. Some residents reported feeling nauseated and started to vomit. Overall, damage in Oahu was moderate, with some structures compromised and a number of collapses reported.

=== Molokai ===
In Molokai, the earthquake overturned furniture and kitchen items in homes. Stone houses began to crack as the ground shook. Parts of a Catholic church fell to the ground, and plasters came off most buildings in the area. Ground fissures tore through the landscape, breaking roads. The severity of shaking corresponded towards VIII–IX (Severe–Violent). North-central Molokai felt weaker intensities of VI–VII (Strong–Very strong).

=== Hawaii ===
A direct observer wrote in a letter stating that the shaking was "as severe as" the 1868 earthquake. The sound of roaring was heard during the quake, which was described as having a great intensity and weakening, ending with an extremely violent shock before the shaking had stopped. Stone walls everywhere toppled in Kawaihae.

== See also ==
- List of earthquakes in Hawaii
- List of earthquakes in the United States
