= Morse Field (Hawaii) =

Morse Field
- Part of Seventh Air Force
- Hawaii County, near Ka Lae
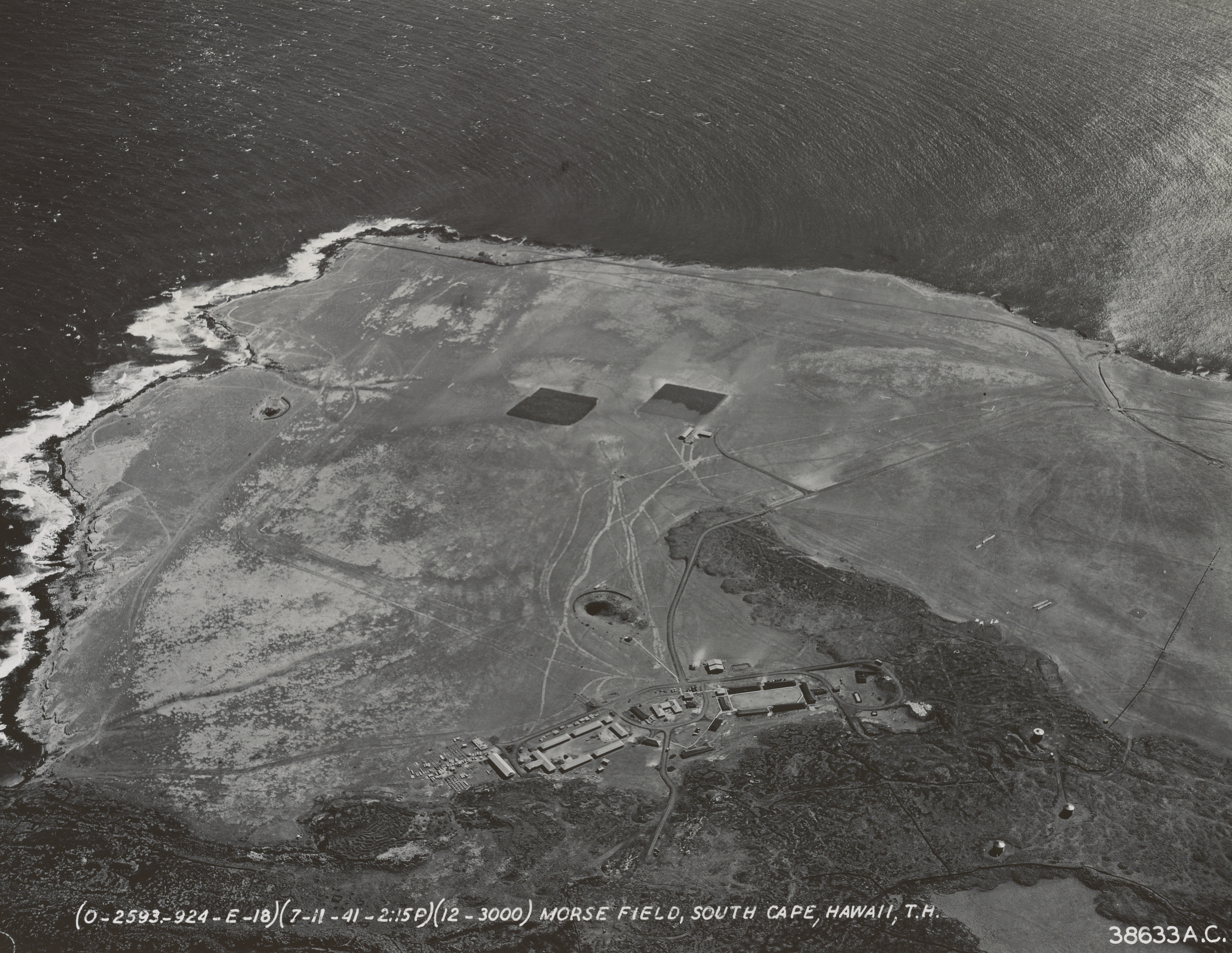
- Morse Field, 1941

Site information
- Type: Army Airfield
- Controlled by: United States Army Air Forces

Location
- Location of Morse Field, Hawaii
- Coordinates: 18°54′58″N 155°40′41″W

Site history
- Built: 1941
- In use: Air Base 1933-1948; Emergency runway 1948-1953; Radar tower 1964-1983

Garrison information
- Garrison: Seventh Air Force

Morse Field is a former military airfield located approximately 12 miles (19 km) south-southwest of Naʻālehu, Hawaii. It was also known as South Cape Airport, South Point Air Force Station, or Ka Lae Military Reservation. It is now abandoned.

== History ==
The facility was located at Ka Lae, the southernmost point on the island of Hawaii and consisted of 11.8 acres (4.8 ha) of land owned in fee simple plus utility easements covering 21 acres (8.5 ha) of land.

=== Morse Field ===
In 1941 construction was underway on five buildings, runways, and access roads at Morse Field. Activities were centralized at this airport inasmuch as its location shortened by approximately 200 miles (320 km), from a routing through Oahu, the transpacific air ferry route to Australia and the Philippines. Construction work, originally under the Zone Constructing Quartermaster, was transferred to the District Engineer in late 1940. A total of $1,534,793 was requested from the War Department in May for completion of the project; this amount later increased to $2,020,000.

The work on the Morse Field was an earth field with a marston mat runways at Morse Field was suspended shortly after the December 7, 1941 Japanese attack on Hawaii, and all adjacent landing areas demolished and the strip destroyed as a precautionary measure against enemy use. By 28 December 1941, gasoline storage facilities were complete, a water line installed, and mobilization buildings were more than half finished. These projects were all that were deemed appropriate for continuance at the time.

Blocking of landing areas on the island occupied large amounts of time and manpower due to the extensive areas involved and the comparatively smooth surfaces surrounding the field, which could be used as landing fields.

After World War II it was declared surplus and on January 16, 1948, a right of entry from the U.S. Army to the Territory of Hawaii was approved. It was not until August 30, 1952 that the property was finally restored to the Territory by Executive Order.

=== South Point Air Force Station ===
In December 1964, General Bernard A. Schriever of the AFSC announced that the Air Force would assume control of space tracking and communications from the Navy at South Point on 1 February 1965. Then on 30 September 1965, the Station was closed.

It was later reopened, however, in support of Project Have Lent, a sounding rocket probe program to evaluate advanced ballistic reentry system experiments. The close proximity and aspect angle of South Point to the optical site sensors located on the island of Maui were the primary reasons for launching the probes from this location.

In 1979, the Station was divided in two parcels located about 1.5 miles (2.4 km) apart, containing approximately 5.9 acres (24,000 m^{2}) each. One of the sites was the main operations area, while the other areas was used for a boresight tower.

The Station was under the operational control of the Space and Missile Test Center (SAMTEC).

South Point AFS was one of the few Air Force installations in the State of Hawaii that did not fall under the control of the 15th Air Base Wing at Hickam AFB. It belonged to the Air Force Systems Command (AFSC), with headquarters at Andrews AFB.

== Final closing ==
On February 11, 1983, the facilities at the former Morse Field were formally closed by the governor's executive order.

== See also ==
- Hawaii World War II Army Airfields
