= List of earthquakes in Hawaii =

Date	Region	M		MMI	Deaths	Injuries	Comments
2018-05-04	Hawaii – Eastern rift zone	6.9	M_{w}	VIII			Moderate damage
2006-10-15	Hawaii – Western	6.7	M_{w}	VIII		Several	Significant damage / tsunami / landslides
1983-11-16	Hawaii – Central	6.7	M_{w}	VIII–IX		6	Considerable damage / landslides
1975-11-29	Hawaii – Eastern rift zone	7.4	M_{w}	VIII	2	several–28	Destructive tsunami
1973-04-26		6.1		VII		11	Severe damage
1951-08-21		6.9		VII		2	Moderate damage / tsunami
1871-02-20		7.5		VIII			Moderate damage
1868-04-03	Hawaii – Southern	7.9		X	31–77		Limited damage / homes destroyed / tsunami
Note: The inclusion criteria for adding events are based on WikiProject Earthquakes' notability guideline that was developed for stand-alone articles. The principles described also apply to lists. In summary, only damaging, injurious, or deadly events should be recorded.
