= Shigeo Kikuchi =

Shigeo Kikuchi (died 1985) was a bōmori (坊守), a Buddhist missionary's wife, in Hawaii in the years surrounding World War II.

Born in Japan at an unknown date, Kikuchi was the wife of the Reverend Chikyoku Kikuchi, who was in charge of the Buddhist temple in Naalehu. She came to Hawaii in 1914, and with her husband served as a Shin missionary; she also taught Japanese classes and served as a prominent member of Naalehu's Japanese-American community while her husband traveled on horseback to serve workers in the cane fields and sugar plantations. Chikyoku Kikuchi was interned in California during World War II, and Shigeo took over many of his duties until his return, including organizing departure ceremonies for Nisei soldiers and distributing nenju prayer beads. Heavily active in Fujinkai, she also served as an intermediary with military authorities, and tried to protect her neighbors from harassment. Japanese-American internees were not allowed to receive letters in Japanese, and to counter this she learned English so she could write to them in that language. After the war, Chikyoku Kikuchi returned to his priestly duties; he and his wife retired in 1953. Shigeo Kikuchi kept a memoir of her time in Hawaii, covering among other things the war years; this was published by the Buddhist Study Center Press as Memoirs of a Buddhist Woman Missionary in Hawaii in 1991.
