= Nāʻālehu, Hawaii =

Census-designated place in Hawaii, U.S.

Nāʻālehu
- Census-designated place
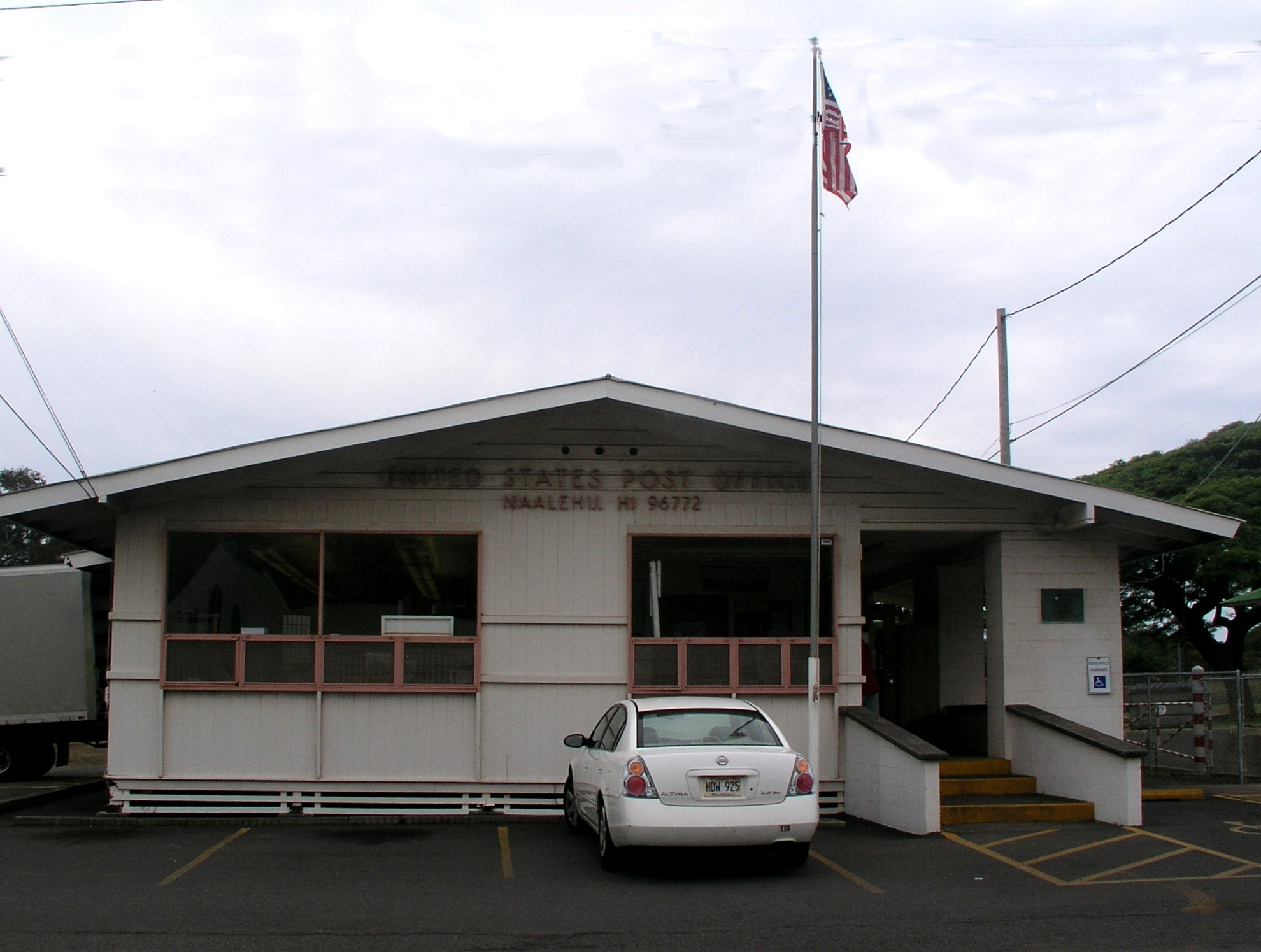
- Naalehu Post Office
- Motto: "southernmost town in the U.S.A."
- Location in Hawaiʻi County and the state of Hawaiʻi
- Coordinates: 19°3′40″N 155°35′00″W
- Country: United States
- State: Hawaiʻi
- County: Hawaiʻi

Area
  - Total: 2.17 sq mi (5.62 km^{2})
  - Land: 2.17 sq mi (5.62 km^{2})
  - Water: 0 sq mi (0.00 km^{2})
- Elevation: 738 ft (225 m)

Population (2020)
  - Total: 811
  - Density: 374.1/sq mi (144.43/km^{2})
- Time zone: UTC−10 (Hawaii-Aleutian)
- ZIP code: 96772
- Area code: 808
- FIPS code: 15-53600
- GNIS feature ID: 0362519

Nāʻālehu is a community in Hawaiʻi County, Hawaii, United States. Nāʻālehu is Hawaiian for "the volcanic ashes". It is one of the southernmost communities with a post office in the 50 states of the United States. (See List of extreme points of the United States.) For statistical purposes, the United States Census Bureau has defined Nāʻālehu as a census-designated place (CDP). The census definition of the area may not precisely correspond to local understanding of the area with the same name. The population was 866 at the 2010 census, down from 919 at the 2000 census.

== History ==
Initially created as one of several plantation camps by the Hutchinson Sugar Plantation Company, Nāʻālehu would later be developed as a proper town by plantation Manager J. Beaty in an effort to make plantation life more comfortable for workers and "citify" the scattered plantation camps. These camps were initially consolidated into four main villages: Nāʻālehu, Honuapo, Hīlea and Kaʻalaiki; with those last three villages consolidated into the town of Nāʻālehu by 1928.

At one time there were two mills, an 8-roller mill at Nāʻālehu and a 9-roller mill at Honuapo. Hilea also had its own mill, but it was dismantled in 1907. Around 1911, the Nāʻālehu mill wore out and a new central mill was built at Honuapo to grind the cane. The landing was located at Honuapo and it had the reputation of being able to load and ship sugar cheaper than any other port in the islands.

== Geography ==
Nāʻālehu is located near the southern tip of the island of Hawaiʻi at 19°3′57″N 155°35′15″W (19.065925, -155.587528) in the Kaʻū District. It is bordered to the west by Waiohinu, and Discovery Harbour is to the southwest. (The two communities are census-designated places but do not have post offices.)

According to the United States Census Bureau, the Nāʻālehu CDP has a total area of 2.2 square miles (5.6 km^{2}), all of it land.

== Demographics ==
Historical population
Census	Pop.	Note	%±
1940	1,038		—
1950	1,004		−3.3%
1960	952		−5.2%
1970	1,014		6.5%
1980	1,168		15.2%
1990	1,027		−12.1%
2000	919		−10.5%
2010	866		−5.8%
2020	811		−6.4%
U.S. Decennial Census

As of the census of 2000, there were 919 people, 290 households, and 209 families residing in the CDP. The population density was 426.1 inhabitants per square mile (164.5/km^{2}). There were 332 housing units at an average density of 153.9 per square mile (59.4/km^{2}). The racial makeup of the CDP was 8.38% White, 0.33% African American, 0.11% Native American, 45.59% Asian, 13.82% Pacific Islander, 0.33% from other races, and 31.45% from two or more races. Hispanic or Latino of any race were 5.44% of the population.

There were 290 households, out of which 31.7% had children under the age of 18 living with them, 54.1% were married couples living together, 11.0% had a female householder with no husband present, and 27.9% were non-families. 25.9% of all households were made up of individuals, and 12.1% had someone living alone who was 65 years of age or older. The average household size was 3.17 and the average family size was 3.77.

In the CDP the population was spread out, with 30.6% under the age of 18, 7.7% from 18 to 24, 23.4% from 25 to 44, 21.8% from 45 to 64, and 16.5% who were 65 years of age or older. The median age was 36 years. For every 100 females, there were 96.8 males. For every 100 females age 18 and over, there were 96.3 males.

The median income for a household in the CDP was $31,750, and the median income for a family was $36,964. Males had a median income of $23,625 versus $20,125 for females. The per capita income for the CDP was $11,755. 20.4% of the population and 16.8% of families were below the poverty line. Out of the total population, 22.0% of those under the age of 18 and 6.6% of those 65 and older were living below the poverty line.

== Points of interest ==
Nāʻālehu is home to one of several ground communication stations operated by Bigelow Aerospace that is used to communicate with its space modules in orbit. The southernmost church in the United States is Lighthouse Baptist Church.

== Climate ==
Climate data for Naalehu 14, HI, 1981-2010 normals, extremes 1905-present
Month	Jan	Feb	Mar	Apr	May	Jun	Jul	Aug	Sep	Oct	Nov	Dec	Year
Record high °F (°C)	89 (32)	92 (33)	93 (34)	89 (32)	93 (34)	92 (33)	96 (36)	96 (36)	92 (33)	90 (32)	90 (32)	91 (33)	96 (36)
Mean daily maximum °F (°C)	77.6 (25.3)	78.1 (25.6)	78.0 (25.6)	78.1 (25.6)	79.1 (26.2)	80.0 (26.7)	80.7 (27.1)	81.5 (27.5)	82.1 (27.8)	81.2 (27.3)	79.6 (26.4)	77.9 (25.5)	79.5 (26.4)
Mean daily minimum °F (°C)	62.6 (17.0)	62.2 (16.8)	63.2 (17.3)	64.2 (17.9)	65.3 (18.5)	66.8 (19.3)	67.3 (19.6)	68.1 (20.1)	67.9 (19.9)	67.4 (19.7)	66.2 (19.0)	64.5 (18.1)	65.5 (18.6)
Record low °F (°C)	50 (10)	52 (11)	50 (10)	50 (10)	50 (10)	54 (12)	53 (12)	60 (16)	56 (13)	59 (15)	55 (13)	54 (12)	50 (10)
Average precipitation inches (mm)	5.37 (136)	4.09 (104)	4.11 (104)	3.19 (81)	2.38 (60)	1.87 (47)	3.57 (91)	3.28 (83)	4.04 (103)	4.67 (119)	6.53 (166)	5.64 (143)	48.74 (1,237)
Average rainy days (≥ 0.01 in)	9.8	7.9	8.5	11.3	12.2	8.4	10.1	10.4	11.9	12.9	10.9	10.8	125.1

== Education ==
The statewide school district is the Hawaii State Department of Education, and it covers Hawaii County. Nāʻālehu Elementary School is in the community.

The Hawaii State Public Library System operates Naalehu Public Library. The library presently used opened on February 24, 1994, and it reopened after an expansion on November 15, 2021. It originally had 775 square feet (72.0 m^{2}) of area, while the expansion increased its size by, 901 square feet (83.7 m^{2}).

== Gallery ==
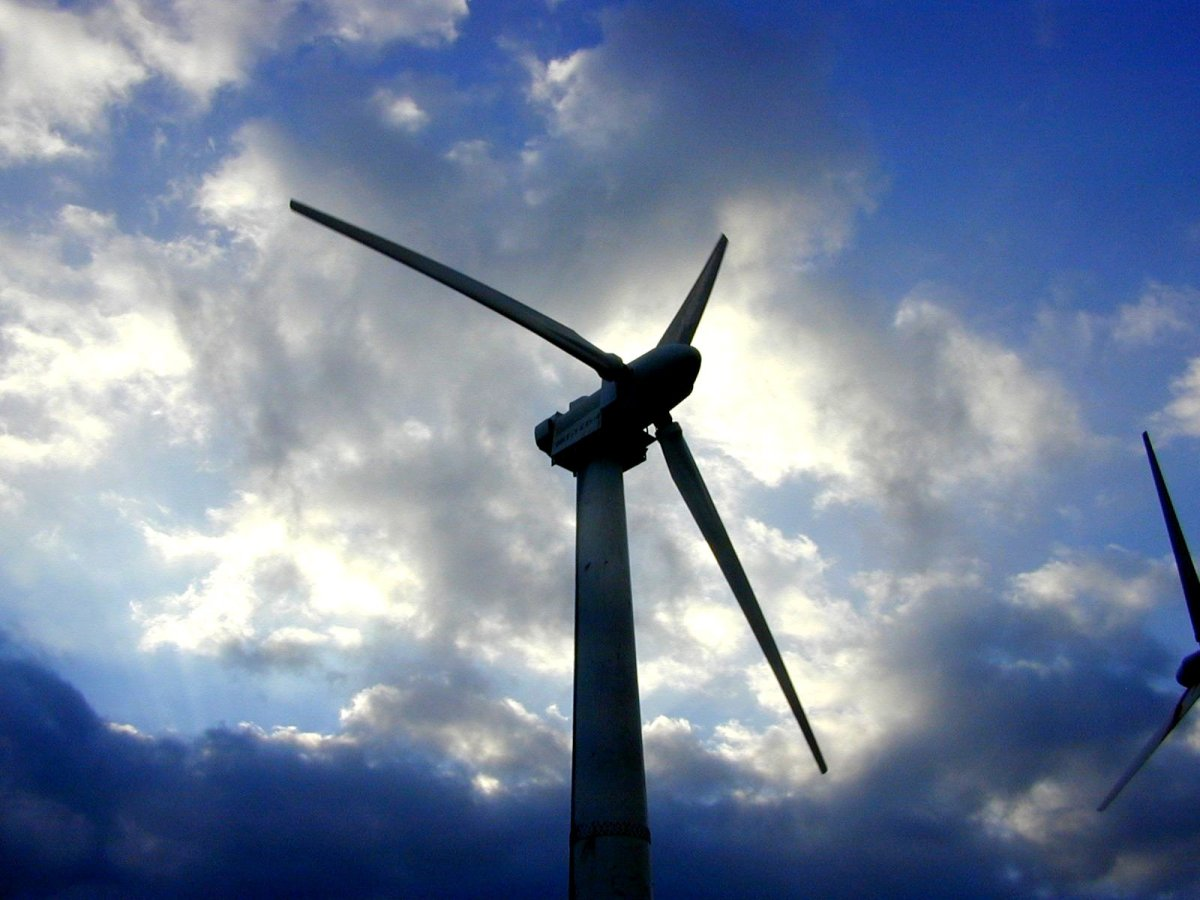
South Point Wind Farm

== Notable residents ==
- Shigeo Kikuchi, Buddhist missionary and memoirist
