= Nīnole, Hawaii =

Unincorporated community in Hawaii, United States

Nīnole, Kaʻū, Hawaii
- unincorporated community
- Location within the state of Hawaii
- Coordinates: 19°8′2″N 155°30′45″W
- Country: United States
- State: Hawaii
- County: Hawaiʻi
- Elevation: 85 ft (26 m)
- Time zone: UTC−10 (Hawaii–Aleutian)
- GNIS feature ID: 362657

Nīnole, Hāmākua, Hawaii
- unincorporated community
- Location within the state of Hawaii
- Coordinates: 19°56′17″N 155°10′8″W
- ZIP code: 96773
- GNIS feature ID: 362658

Nīnole (also spelled Hinole, Ninole, or Ninoli) is the name of two unincorporated communities on the island of Hawaiʻi in Hawaiʻi County, Hawaii, United States. In the Hawaiian language Nīnole means "bending". Nīnole also has the highest percentage of people of Italian descent in Hawaii.

== Kaʻū ==
One Nīnole is in the Kaʻū District south of Route 11 (Hawaii Belt Road) adjacent to the south of Punaluʻu Beach. It was on Nīnole Cove, a small bay at the shore of what is now Sea Mountain Golf Course. The village was the birthplace of Henry ʻŌpūkahaʻia (1792–1818) who inspired the missionary movement that forever changed Hawaii. It was mostly destroyed by a tsunami after the 1868 Hawaii earthquake. Its elevation is 85 feet (26 m). Because the community has borne multiple names, the Board on Geographic Names officially designated it "Nīnole" in 2000.

== Hāmākua ==
The other Nīnole is on the Hāmākua Coast north of Hilo along Route 19 (Māmalahoa Highway) south of Pāpaʻaloa and north of Hakalau. It has a post office with the ZIP code 96773. It is located at 19°56′17″N 155°10′4″W.
