= ʻĀpua, Hawaii =

Former settlement on Hawaiʻi Island

ʻĀpua was an ancient village in the Puna district on the southern coast of the Island of Hawaiʻi in the Hawaiian Islands. A small fishing village was located at about 19°15′41″N 155°11′46″W, an elevation about 59 feet (18 m) above sea level. The village was destroyed by a tsunami following the April 2, 1868 Hawaii earthquake and never resettled.

ʻĀpua Point, just south of the former village site, has a backcountry campground for Hawaii Volcanoes National Park. There is no drinking water nor other facilities at the site. Weather and surf conditions can be very dangerous. The trail crosses both old and new lava flows from the active volcano.
