= Anthropological Papers of the University of Alaska =

Academic journal published by the University of Alaska Fairbanks

The Anthropological Papers of the University of Alaska is an academic journal published by the Department of Anthropology at the University of Alaska Fairbanks. It was established in December 1952 and 25 volumes appeared irregularly through 2000. A new series was begun in 2000; as of 2010 5 volumes have been published in it.

Several key papers in Alaskan anthropology have appeared in the journal, including Edward Vajda's 2010 paper on the Dene–Yeniseian hypothesis. As of April 2012, the journal and back-issues are available in hard copy only; no electronic version is available.

The journal is abstracted and indexed in Anthropological Index Online. It should not be confused with the Alaska Journal of Anthropology, published by the Alaska Anthropological Association beginning in 2001.
