= 1975 Hawaii earthquake =

Earthquake in Hawaii, United States

- Location within Hawaii
- UTC time: 1975-11-29 14:47:43
- ISC event: 722344
- USGS-ANSS: ComCat
- Local date: November 29, 1975; 50 years ago
- Local time: 04:47:43
- Magnitude: M_{w} 7.7
- Depth: 10.0 km (6.2 mi)
- Epicenter: 19.44°N 155.15°W
- Areas affected: Hawaii; United States
- Total damage: $4–4.1 million
- Max. intensity: MMI VIII (Severe)
- Tsunami: 14.3 m (47 ft)
- Casualties: 2 dead several–28 injured

Animation from NOAA

The 1975 Hawaii earthquake occurred on November 29 with a moment magnitude of 7.7 and a maximum Mercalli intensity of VIII (Severe). The shock affected several of the Hawaiian Islands and resulted in the deaths of two people and up to 28 injured. Significant damage occurred in the southern part of the Big Island totalling $4–4.1 million, and it also triggered a small brief eruption of Kilauea volcano.

The event generated a large tsunami that was as high as 47 feet (14 m) on Hawaii'i island and was detected in Alaska, California, Japan, Okinawa, Samoa, and on Johnston and Wake Islands. Significant changes to the shorelines along the southern coast of the Big Island with subsidence of 12 feet (3.7 m) was observed, causing some areas to be permanently submerged. The source of the event was the Hilina Slump, which was also responsible for the more powerful 1868 Hawaii earthquake and tsunami.

== See also ==
- List of earthquakes in 1975
- List of earthquakes in Hawaii
- List of earthquakes in the United States
