= Honuapo =

Ghost town on the island of Hawaii

Coordinates: 19.088°N 155.548°W

Honuapo or Honuʻapo is a ghost town on the island of Hawaii in the U.S. state of Hawaii. It was a thriving port town from the 1870s to the 1930s. The port was used to transport Colocasia esculenta (taro), and sugarcane. Little of the town remains today other than the pier, which was destroyed in 1946 by a tsunami.
