= 1868 Hawaii earthquake =

Largest recorded earthquake in Hawaiian history

1868 Hawaiʻi earthquake
- Location within Hawaii
- UTC time: 1868-04-03 02:30
- USGS-ANSS: ComCat
- Local date: April 2, 1868
- Local time: 16:00
- Magnitude: 7.9 M_{fa}
- Epicenter: 19.2°N 155.5°W
- Areas affected: Hawaiʻi
- Total damage: Limited
- Max. intensity: MMI X (Extreme)
- Tsunami: Yes
- Casualties: 77 killed

The 1868 Hawaiʻi earthquake was the largest recorded in the history of Hawaiʻi island, with an estimated magnitude of 7.9 M_{fa} and a maximum Mercalli intensity of X (Extreme). The earthquake occurred at 4 p.m. local time on April 2, 1868, and caused a landslide and tsunami that led to 77 deaths. The aftershock sequence for this event has continued up to the present day.

== Background ==
The island of Hawaiʻi (commonly called the "Big Island") is the currently active volcanic center of the Hawaiian Islands formed over the Hawaii hotspot. Two of the active volcanoes on the Big Island are Kīlauea and Mauna Loa with a newer submarine volcano forming the Kamaʻehuakanaloa Seamount (formerly Lōʻihi) to the southeast of the island. Continued growth of the southeastern part of the island is accompanied by major slumping and southeastward movement of the flanks of the two volcanoes.

This flank displacement is linked to extension within the rift zones associated with both of the active volcanoes, the Mauna Loa and Kīlauea rifts. From the interpretation of seismic reflection data, it has been proposed that the southeastward displacement takes place on a decollement surface near the top of the oceanic crust. The slumping is thought to affect only the upper part of the flank as the amount of shortening observed in the toe thrust zone is much larger than that observed in the extensional faults associated with the slumps, but matches well with estimates of extension within the volcanic rift systems.

Selected Mercalli Intensities
MMI	Locations
MMI X (Extreme)	Hilo, Kīlauea, Nīnole, Pāhala, Punaluʻu
MMI VIII (Severe)	Kohala
MMI VII (Very strong)	Kealakekua, Waipiʻo
MMI V (Moderate)	Honolulu, Kauaʻi, Lānaʻi
U.S. Earthquake Intensity Database, National Geophysical Data Center

=== Hilina Slump ===
The Hilina Slump is the largest of the active slumps around the Hawaiian islands. The 'backscarp' to the slump is formed by the Hilina extensional fault system, which is known to have moved in both the 1868 event and the 1975 Kalapana earthquake.

=== Earthquake ===
A firsthand description of the events was written by Frederick S. Lyman, a goat and sheep rancher at Keaīwa near the epicenter of the events. A sequence of foreshocks began on March 27, with tremors every few minutes. They increased steadily in intensity, including one on March 28 that had an estimated magnitude of 7.1. The sequence continued until 4 p.m. on April 2, when the mainshock occurred. One interpretation of this sequence of events is that they were related to the movement of two separate landslide structures on the south side of the island. The first, triggered by an eruption that began in the upper part of Mauna Loa's southwest rift, involved movement of a block that extended seawards for at least 12 miles (19 km). The tremors over the next four days are regarded as aftershocks of the 7.1 event caused by this movement. The mainshock involved movement of the entire southern flank of Kīlauea on the basal detachment at an estimated depth of 9 kilometers (5.6 mi), and was probably triggered by the earlier event.

The aftershock sequence has continued for over 140 years until the present day. The aftershock frequency fits a modified Omori (power law) for the first few decades and an exponential function thereafter.

== Damage ==
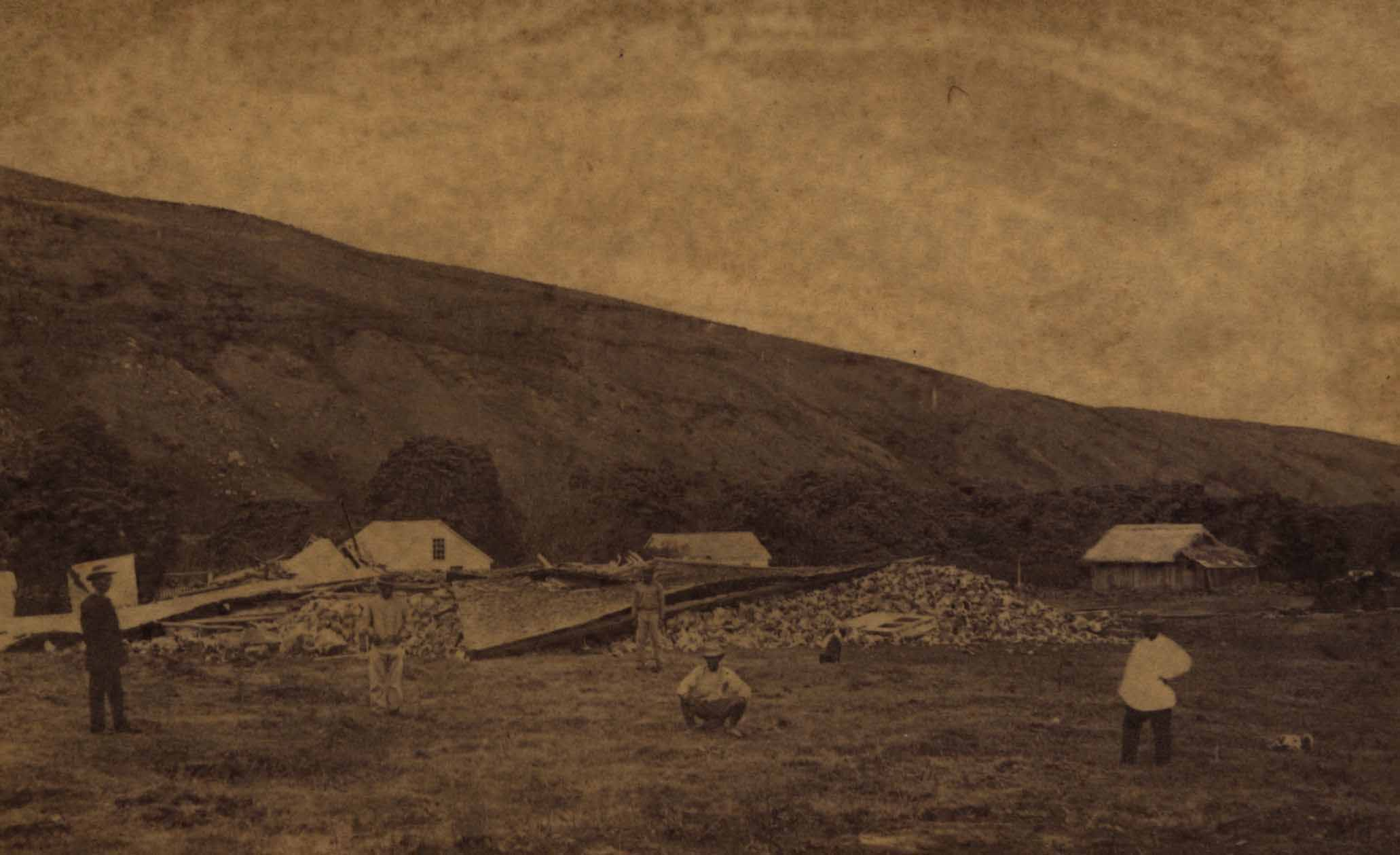
Destruction to Waiʻōhinu Church, photograph by Henry L. Chase, 1868

Wooden houses were knocked off their foundations in Keaīwa, Punaluʻu Beach and Nīnole, while thatched houses supported by posts in the same areas were torn to shreds. The earthquake demolished nearly every stone wall and house within the Kaʻū district in an instant. At Waiʻōhinu, a large stone church built by Reverend John D. Paris collapsed, and in Hilo the shaking destroyed the few stone buildings and most walls.

=== Tsunami ===
A tsunami was caused by coastal subsidence associated with reactivation of the Hilina Slump, triggered by the earthquake. At Kapapala the land subsided by as much as 2 m and formerly dry land was flooded to a depth of 1.5 m. The tsunami on the Kaʻū and Puna coasts caused major destruction at Honu‘apo, Keauhou and Punaluʻu. The greatest damage was caused at Keauhou, where a wave height of 12–15 m was reported. All houses and warehouses were destroyed and 46 people were drowned.

Many villages, such as ʻĀpua, were never resettled.

=== Landslides ===
The earthquake triggered landslides over a wide area. The largest was a mudslide 3 km wide and 9 m thick, that swept down the flanks of Mauna Loa at Kapapala. It swept away trees, animals and people, causing 31 fatalities.

== Effect on volcanic eruptions ==
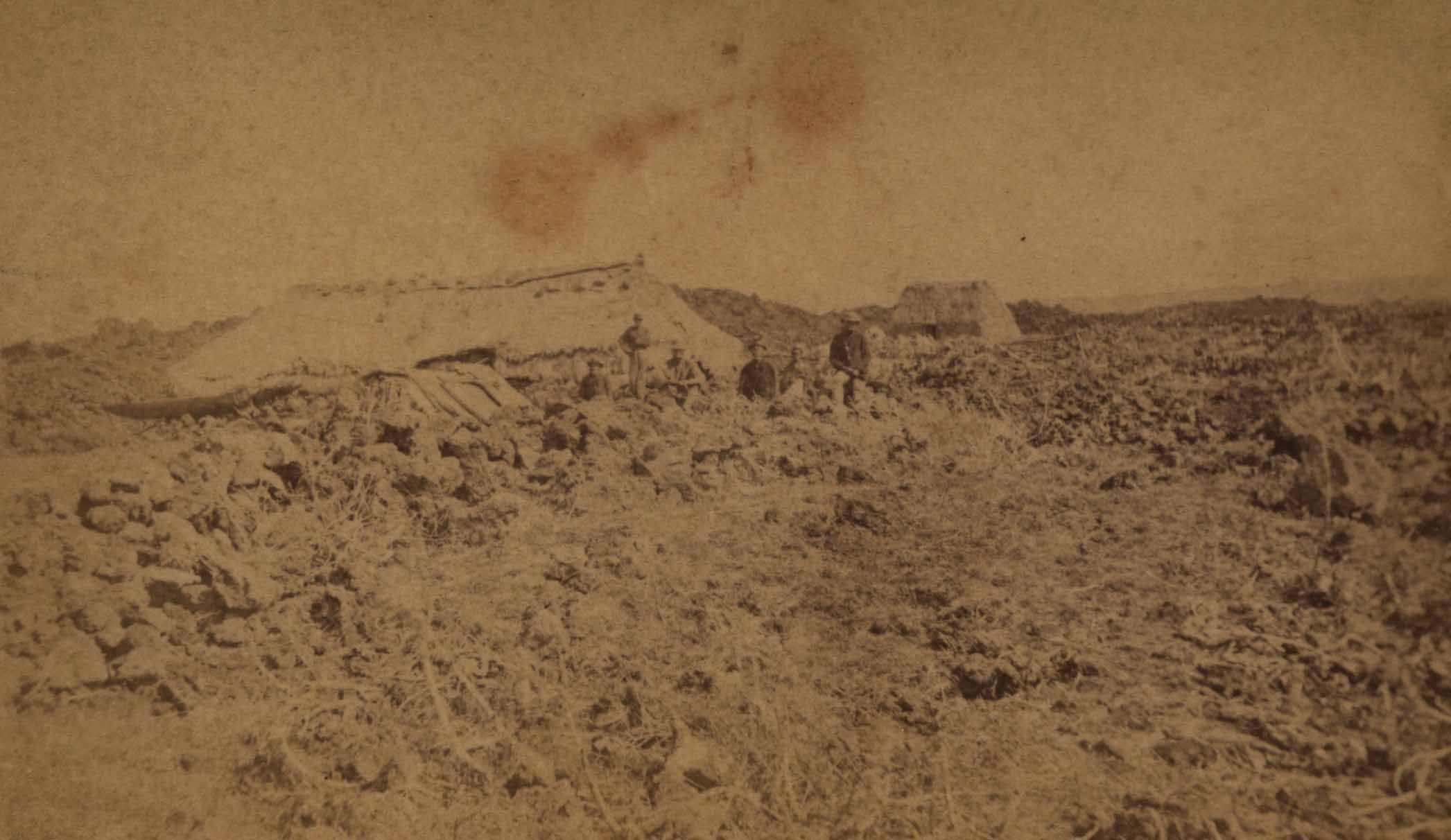
Lava bed after eruption, photograph by Henry L. Chase, 1868

Kīlauea was the most affected by the lateral displacement associated with the earthquake, as it did not have another major eruption until 1919. It also disrupted the magma system beneath Mauna Loa, as is shown both in reduced lava volumes and an abrupt change in the lava chemistry.

== See also ==
- List of earthquakes in Hawaii
- List of earthquakes in the United States
- List of historical earthquakes
- List of tsunamis
