= Wailoa River State Recreation Area =

Protected area in Hawaii County, Hawaii, United States

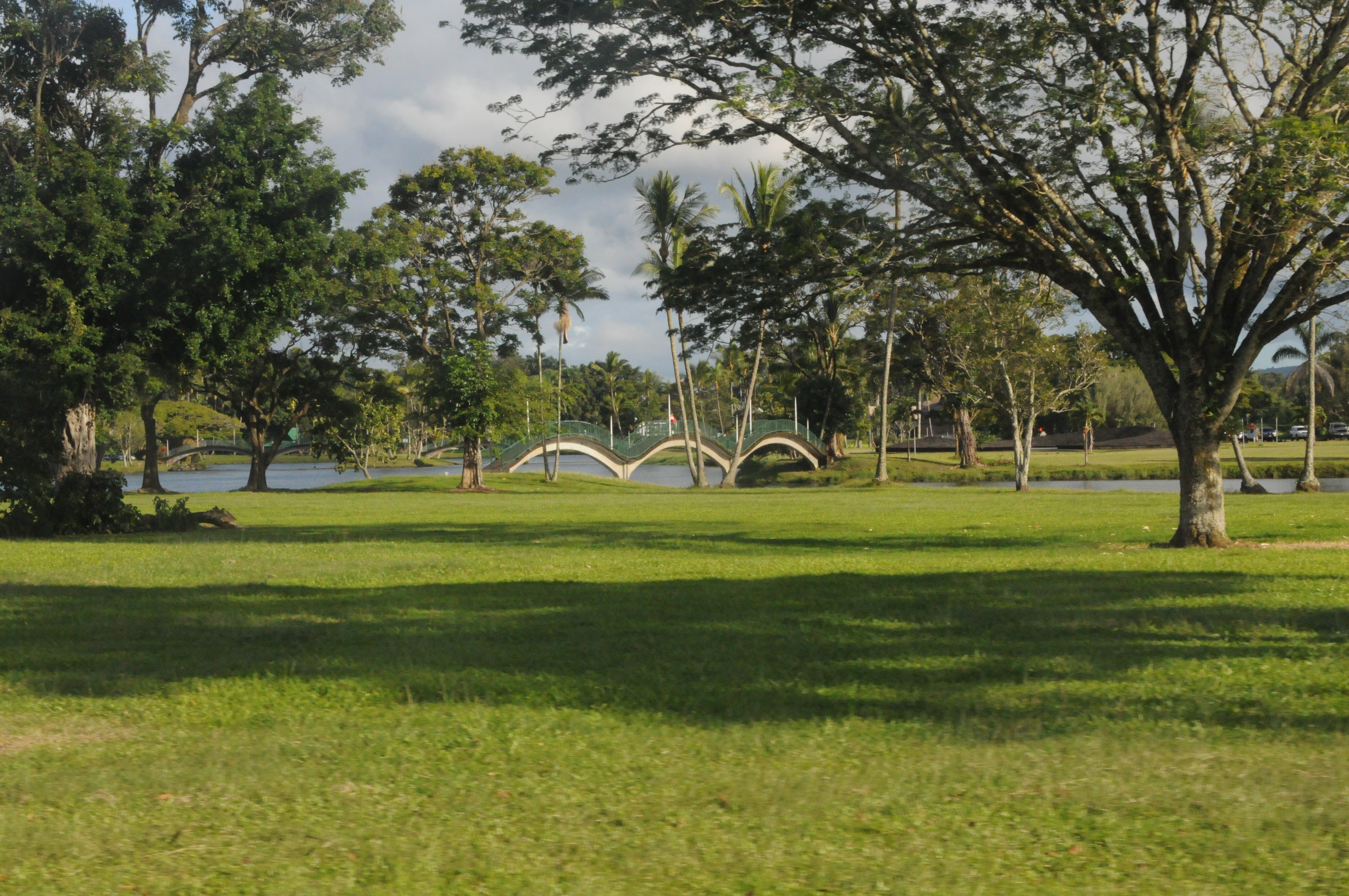
- Wailoa River State Recreation Area, including the Waiolama Footbridge across the mouth of Waiākea Pond

- Location within Hawaii
- Nearest city: Hilo, Hawaii
- Coordinates: 19°43′7″N 155°4′30″W
- Area: 131.9 acres (53.4 ha)
- Created: 1969
- Operator: State of Hawaiʻi
- Website: dlnr.hawaii.gov/dsp/parks/hawaii/wailoa-river-state-recreation-are]

The Wailoa River State Recreation Area, also known as Wailoa River State Park, is a park in Hilo, on Hawaiʻi Island in the US state of Hawaii. It was developed as a buffer zone following the devastating 1960 tsunami that wiped out the central bayfront district of Hilo.

== Description ==
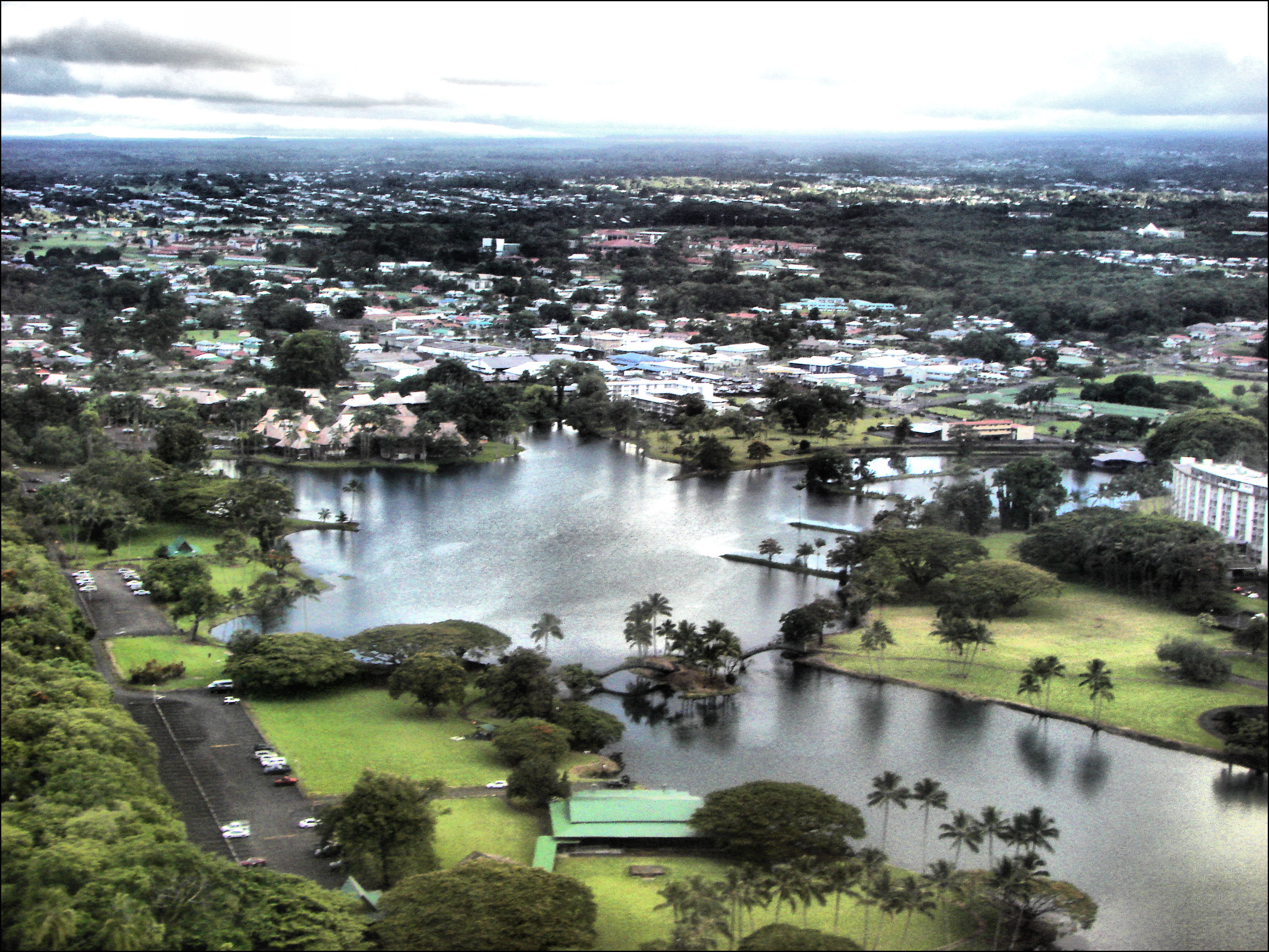
Waiakea Pond within the park

The name wai loa literally means "long water" in the Hawaiian language. The Wailoa River itself flows just a short distance from Waiākea Pond within the park to the Pacific Ocean.

Parks and attractions near Hilo Bay and downtown Hilo, Hawaii
- Points of interest
- Parks and open spaces
- Transportation
1 Lyman House Memorial Museum
2 Haili Church
3 Kalākaua Park / East Hawaii Cultural Center
4 Pacific Tsunami Museum
5 Moʻoheau County Park (Hele-On Bus Terminal) / S. Hata Building / Mokupāpapa Discovery Center
6 Russell Carroll Soccer Fields
7 Aupuni Center / County of Hawaiʻi offices
8 Hilo Bayfront Beach Park
9 Wailoa River State Recreation Area / Waiākea Pond
10 Coconut Island / Moku Ola
11 Queen Liliʻuokalani Park and Gardens / Banyan Drive
12 Grand Naniloa Hotel / Naniloa Golf Course
13 Reed's Bay Beach Park
14 Hoʻolulu Complex (Merrie Monarch Festival site): Afook-Chinen Civic Auditorium · Aunty Sally Kaleohano's Luʻau Hale · Edith Kanakaʻole Stadium · 'Sparky' Kawamoto Swim Stadium · Walter Victor Baseball Complex · Francis Wong Stadium
15 Hilo Harbor
16 Hilo International Airport

The park lies between downtown Hilo, Hawaii and Hilo Bay. The Hawaii Belt Road (Route 19, known as Kamehameha Avenue at this point) forms the northern boundary of the park; the land north of Route 19 is the public Hawaiʻi County-run Hilo Bayfront Beach Park. East of the Wailoa River bridge is another county park, Liliʻuokalani Gardens.

The 131.9-acre (53 ha) park is administered by the Hawaiʻi Department of Land and Natural Resources. It includes a boat ramp and visitor center with cultural displays. The Wailoa Arts & Cultural Center, founded in 1967, has free admission, but limited hours.

=== Kamehameha Statue ===
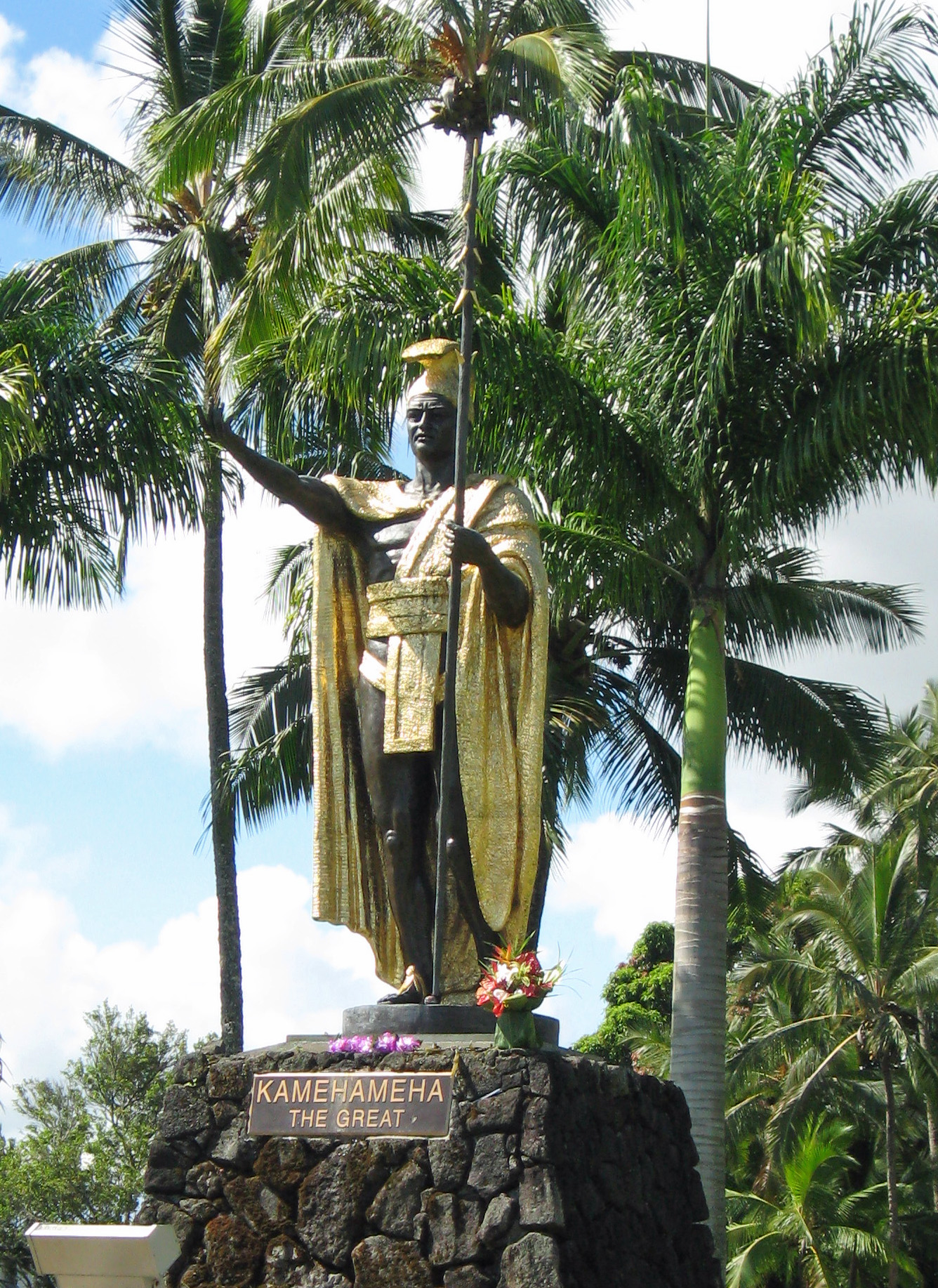
The Kamehameha Statue along the Wailoa River

On display is a Kamehameha Statue (although not the original work by Thomas R. Gould) honoring King Kamehameha I, founder of the Kingdom of Hawaii. The statue was originally commissioned by the Princeville resort on the island of Kauaʻi. However, it was put into storage when the local population pointed out that Kauaʻi was the one major island never conquered by Kamehameha in war. An alumni group from Kamehameha Schools raised funds to transport the statue, and put on display in 1997.

The Royal Order of Kamehameha I objected to the first placement of the statue, pointing out that the shorefront has a history of being devastated by tsunamis.

=== Memorials ===
Memorials within the park include monuments to Shinmachi, the Vietnam War, and the Korean War (dedicated in 2019). The Shinmachi Tsunami Memorial also incorporates a floor mural entitled "Submerged Rocks and Water Reflections" by Hawaiian artist Tadashi Sato.

== History ==
=== Shinmachi ===
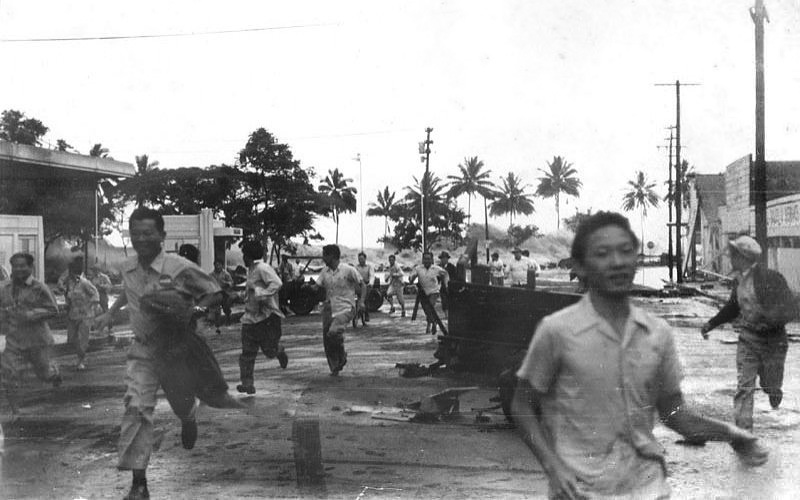
Residents of Shinmachi flee the 1946 tsunami; photograph courtesy of Pacific Tsunami Museum

The central bayfront area was settled in 1913 by first-generation immigrants from Japan, who started businesses in Waiākea and named the area Shinmachi ("New Town"). Shinmachi was wiped out by the tsunami waves resulting from the 1946 Aleutian Islands earthquake on April 1, 1946; wave heights were estimated at 35 to 50 ft (11 to 15 m). Residents returned and rebuilt, only to have Shinmachi destroyed again by another tsunami on May 23, 1960, following the 1960 Valdivia earthquake. A documentary film about Shinmachi was broadcast on local PBS stations in April 2021.

=== Project Kaikoʻo ===
The Hawaiʻi County Board of Supervisors formed the Hawaii Redevelopment Agency (HRA) on May 31, and passed an ordinance banning further reconstruction in the flooded area. A 5-person Board of Commissioners was appointed on July 14, with Ralph Kiyosaki as the first chairman. HRA decided to permanently relocate Shinmachi rather than rebuild and initiated Project Kaikoʻo ("rough seas"), completing the acquisition of land and relocation of residents by 1965. Approximately 300 acres (120 ha) of oceanfront land would be set aside as a green belt and buffer zone to absorb future tsunamis, including the Wailoa River State Recreation Area. At the edge of the high water mark from the 1960 tsunami, 40 acres (16 ha) of land were filled to an average elevation of 26 ft (7.9 m) above sea level, creating a parcel for a new commercial center and County offices along Kilauea Avenue.

Plans for Project Kaikoʻo were approved in March 1961; most businesses agreed to move to public lands zoned for light industrial uses near the airport, but residents were more stubborn and refused relocation. In some cases, land had to be condemned and the property seized. 600,000 yd^{3} (460,000 m^{3}) of volcanic fill were used to create the new commercial center plateau, and the project received a strong endorsement in 1963 when the County decided to build its new center on the elevated site.
