= Grand Naniloa Hotel =

Hotel in Hilo, Hawaii

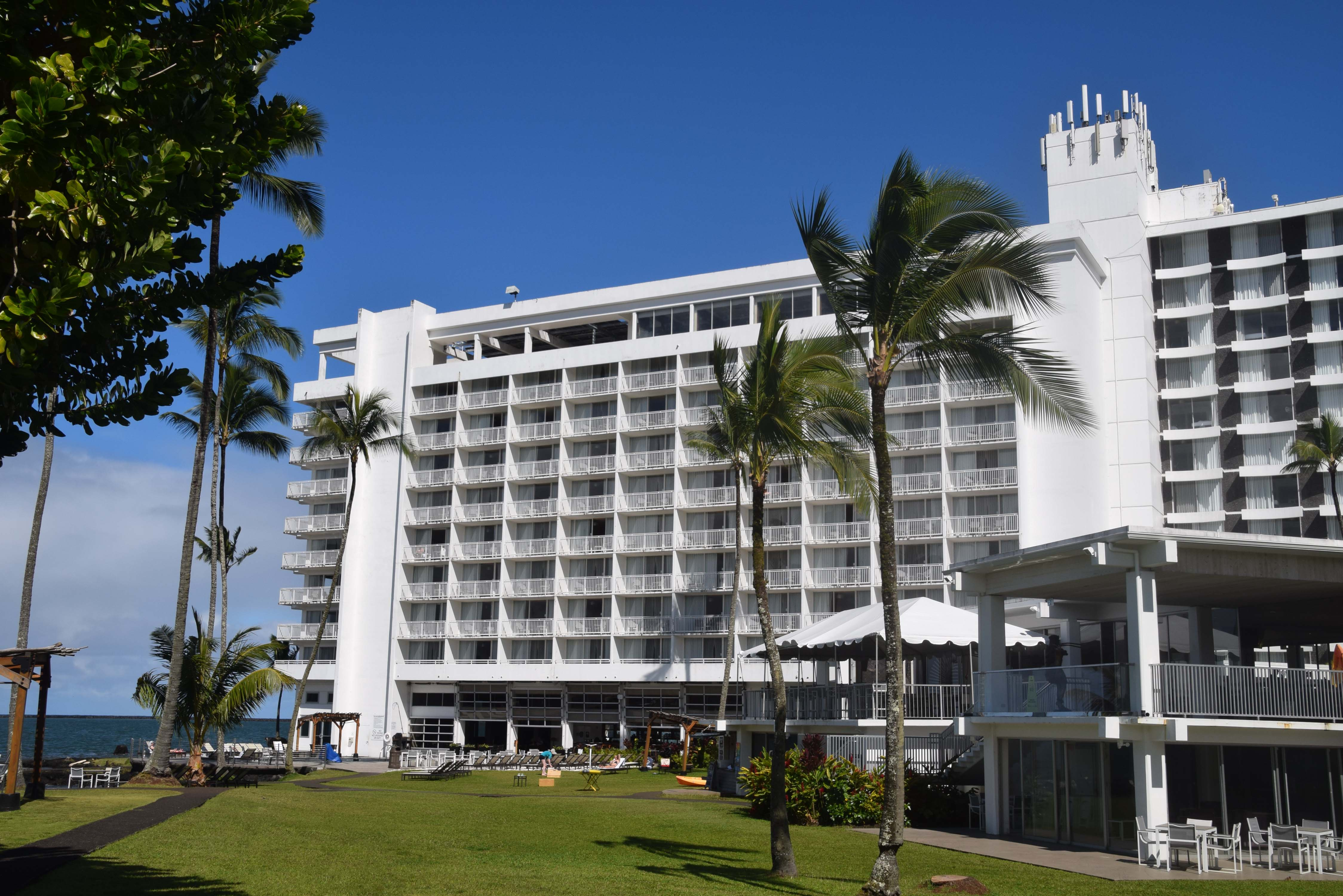
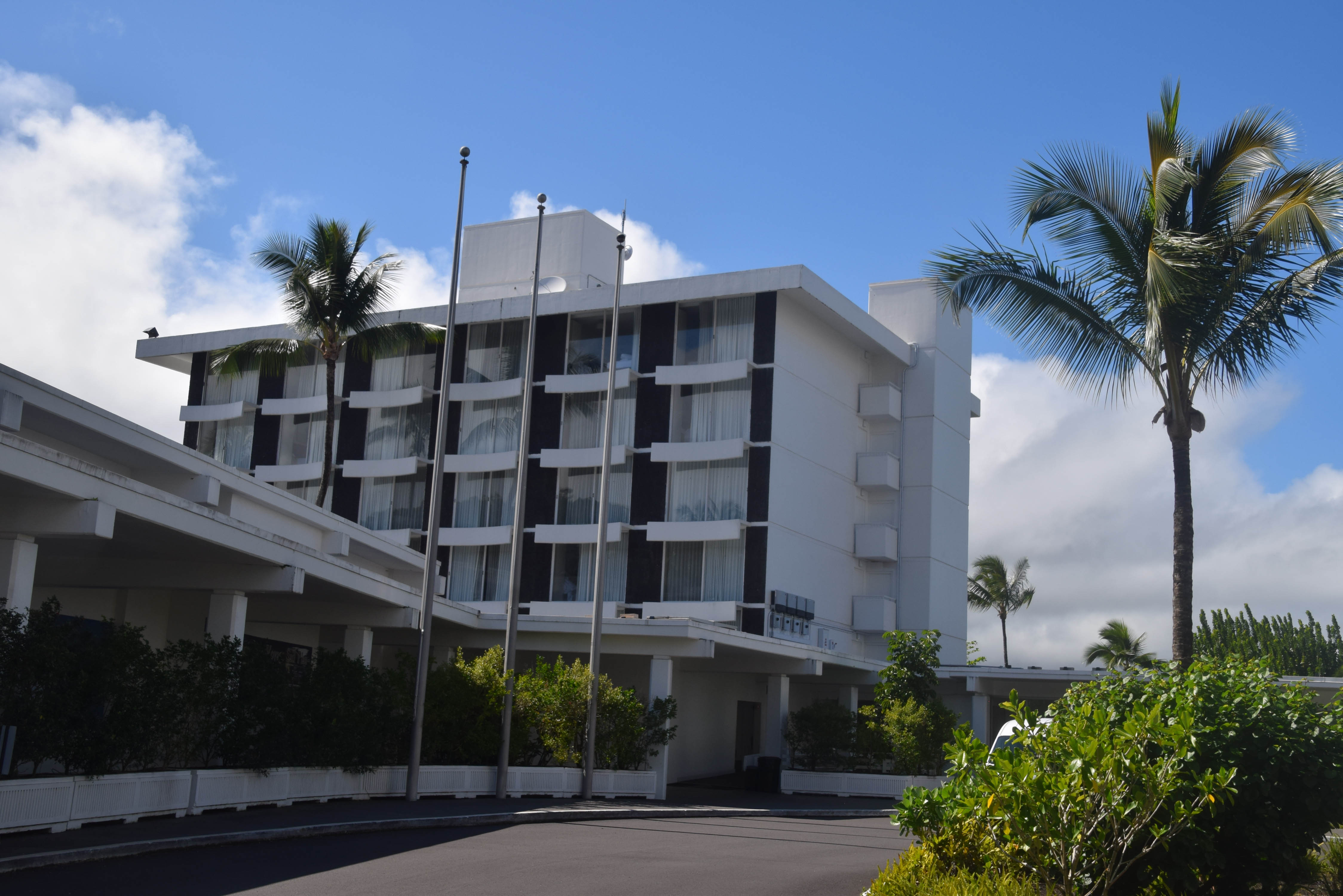
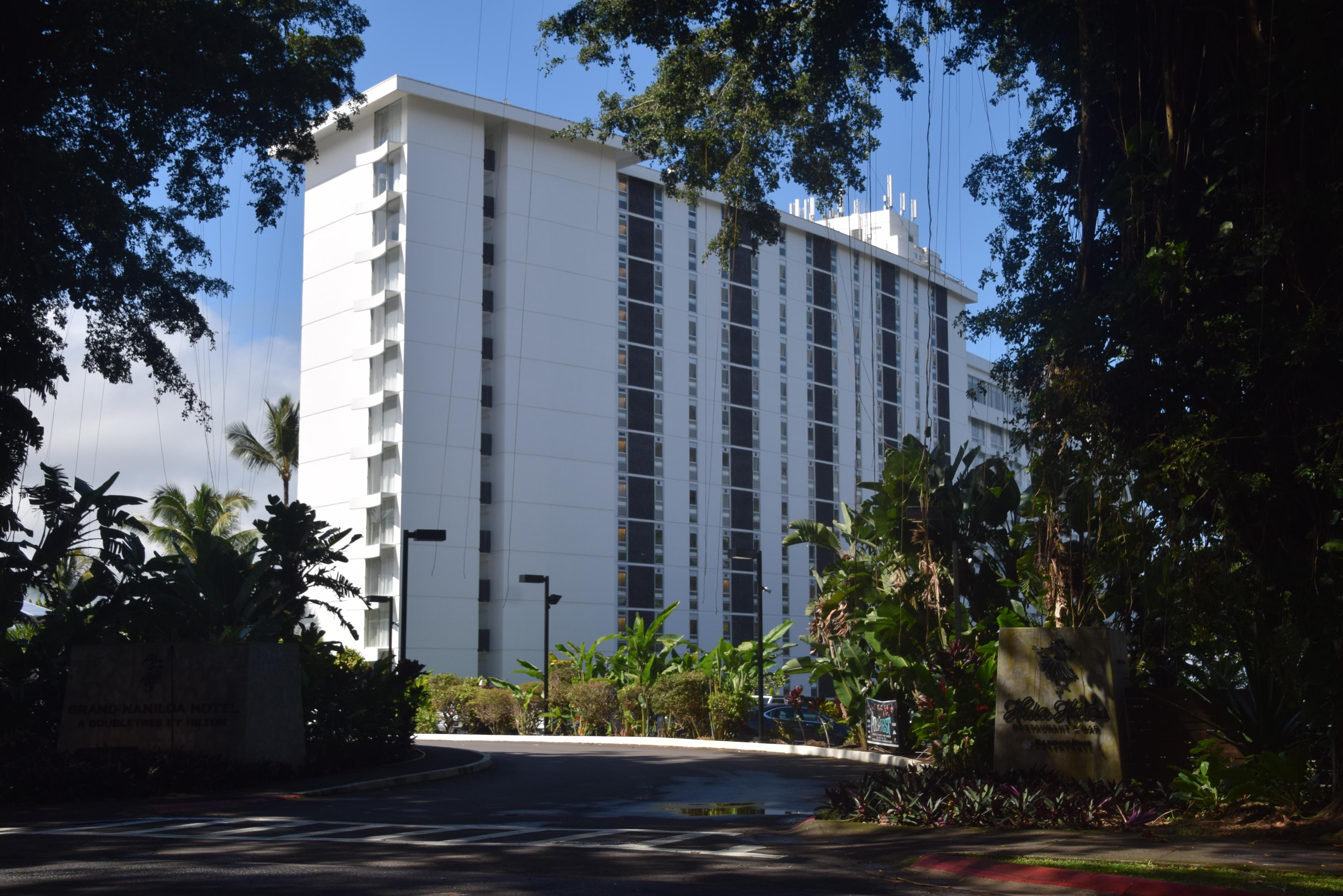
- - ; The Grand Naniloa Hotel; top: The Entrance and Mauna Loa Tower; middle: Mauna Kea Tower; bottom: Kilauea Tower

- Location within Hawaii

General information
- Location: 93 Banyan Drive, Hilo, Hawaii
- Coordinates: 19.7295°N 155.0649°W

The Grand Naniloa Hotel is a hotel in Hilo, Hawaii, on the eastern side of the Big Island. It is the largest hotel in the state of Hawaii's second largest city, and has the longest history as a hotel on Hawaii Island.

== History ==
Parks and attractions near Hilo Bay and downtown Hilo, Hawaii
- Points of interest
- Parks and open spaces
- Transportation
1 Lyman House Memorial Museum
2 Haili Church
3 Kalākaua Park / East Hawaii Cultural Center
4 Pacific Tsunami Museum
5 Moʻoheau County Park (Hele-On Bus Terminal) / S. Hata Building / Mokupāpapa Discovery Center
6 Russell Carroll Soccer Fields
7 Aupuni Center / County of Hawaiʻi offices
8 Hilo Bayfront Beach Park
9 Wailoa River State Recreation Area / Waiākea Pond
10 Coconut Island / Moku Ola
11 Queen Liliʻuokalani Park and Gardens / Banyan Drive
12 Grand Naniloa Hotel / Naniloa Golf Course
13 Reed's Bay Beach Park
14 Hoʻolulu Complex (Merrie Monarch Festival site): Afook-Chinen Civic Auditorium · Aunty Sally Kaleohano's Luʻau Hale · Edith Kanakaʻole Stadium · 'Sparky' Kawamoto Swim Stadium · Walter Victor Baseball Complex · Francis Wong Stadium
15 Hilo Harbor
16 Hilo International Airport

The Grand Naniloa Hotel opened in 1939, on Waiakea Peninsula, a small peninsula that protrudes into Hilo Bay. It is located on Banyan Drive which was developed in the early 1930s and which is lined with large Hawaiian banyan trees. Liliuokalani Park and Gardens are within a walking distance.

In 1946, Hilo was devastated by the tsunami associated with the 1946 Aleutian Islands earthquake and others, but the town and hotel recovered.

The hotel currently consists of three towers, named after the Big Island's volcanos: Mauna Kea, Mauna Loa, and Kilauea.

The management and ownership of the hotel have changed several times. It was originally owned by a local company. In 2013, Aqua-Aston Hotels and Resorts of Honolulu started its management, while Tower Development became the owner.

In 2016, the Hilton Hotels & Resorts completed a three-year renovation of the hotel, and it now operates as a Hilton DoubleTree hotel. It was a $30 million renovation.

== Hula ==
The hotel has an association with hula dancing. It is a host of Hilo's annual Merrie Monarch Festival, which began in 1963, and is now a week-long event with three days of hula competition. The Hula Halau Ke 'Olu Makani 'O Mauna Loa, a hālau hula, regularly practices on the hotel's grounds.

Frommer's summarizes that the hotel "has declared itself 'the home of hula.' Renowned photographer Kim Taylor Reese’s images of hula dancers hang on virtually every wall, high-definition video of the Merrie Monarch hula competition plays in the new, open-air lobby, with a central bar. Hula Hulas poolside restaurant offers locally sourced dishes, live music, and hula."

== Other ==
The hotel has a nine-hole golf course, the only one in Hilo. The hotel has a small swimming pool and stands directly on Hilo Bay, but the guests have to drive one or two miles from Banyan Drive to Kalanianaole Avenue to find sand beaches.

Like other businesses on the bay, the Grand Naniloa Hotel does not own the land on which the hotel is situated, nor its golf course, but rather leases from the Hawai'i Department of Land and Natural Resources. The lease was assumed in the 2013 purchase of the property when the lease had 58 years remaining and required payments of $500,000 per year.

== See also ==
- Hilo Hawaiian Hotel
- Volcano House
