= Liliʻuokalani Park and Gardens =

Garden in Hilo, Hawaii

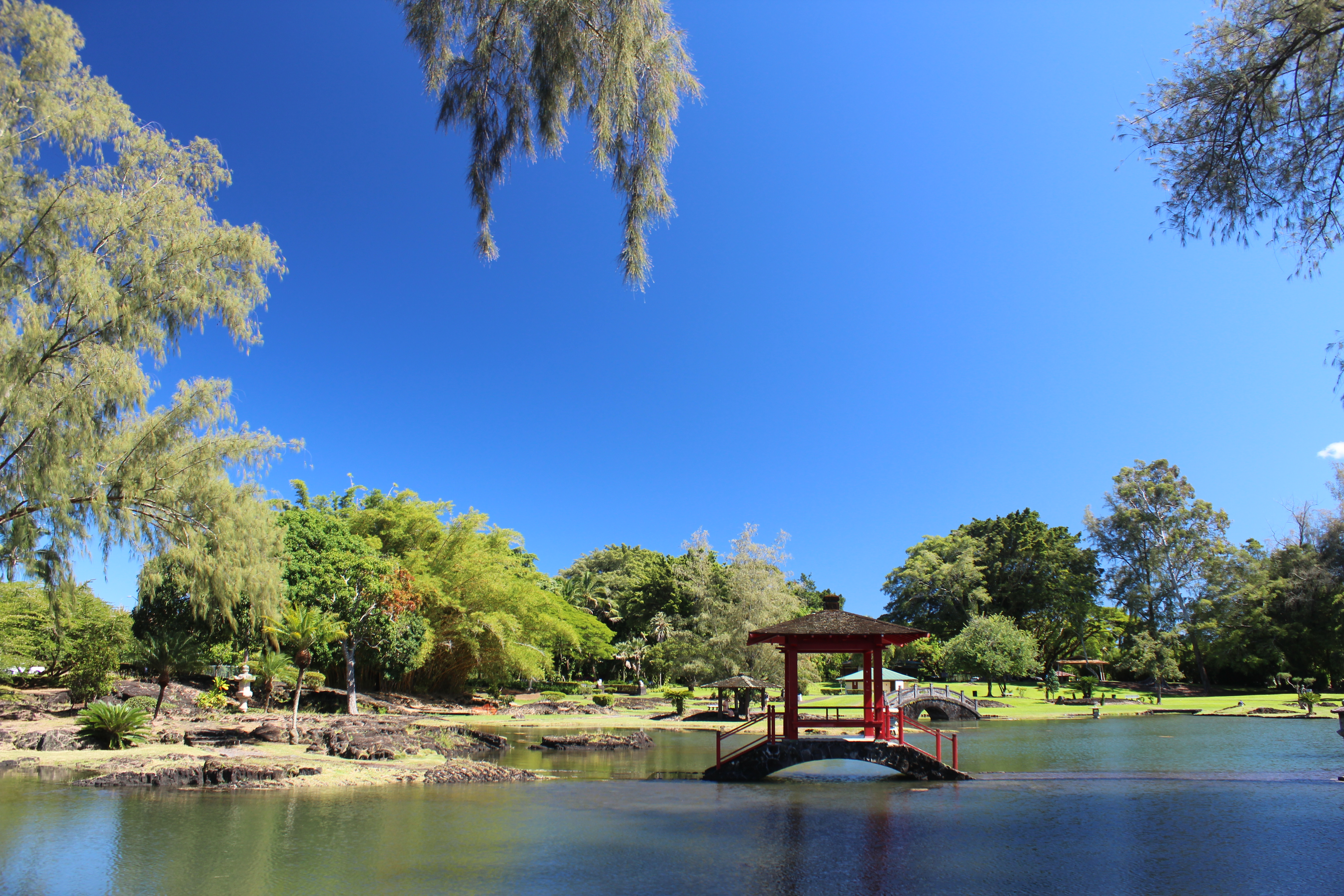
Pagoda and Torii in Liliu'okalani Gardens

Liliʻuokalani Park and Gardens is a 24.14-acre (97,700 m^{2}) park with Japanese gardens, located on Banyan Drive in Hilo on the island of Hawaiʻi.

The park's site was donated by Queen Liliʻuokalani, and lies southeast of downtown Hilo, on the Waiakea Peninsula in Hilo Bay. Much of the park now consists of Edo-style Japanese gardens, built 1917-1919, and said to be the largest such gardens outside Japan. The gardens contain Waihonu Pond as well as bridges, ponds, pagodas, statues, torii, and a Japanese teahouse.

Parks and attractions near Hilo Bay and downtown Hilo, Hawaii
- Points of interest
- Parks and open spaces
- Transportation
1 Lyman House Memorial Museum
2 Haili Church
3 Kalākaua Park / East Hawaii Cultural Center
4 Pacific Tsunami Museum
5 Moʻoheau County Park (Hele-On Bus Terminal) / S. Hata Building / Mokupāpapa Discovery Center
6 Russell Carroll Soccer Fields
7 Aupuni Center / County of Hawaiʻi offices
8 Hilo Bayfront Beach Park
9 Wailoa River State Recreation Area / Waiākea Pond
10 Coconut Island / Moku Ola
11 Queen Liliʻuokalani Park and Gardens / Banyan Drive
12 Grand Naniloa Hotel / Naniloa Golf Course
13 Reed's Bay Beach Park
14 Hoʻolulu Complex (Merrie Monarch Festival site): Afook-Chinen Civic Auditorium · Aunty Sally Kaleohano's Luʻau Hale · Edith Kanakaʻole Stadium · 'Sparky' Kawamoto Swim Stadium · Walter Victor Baseball Complex · Francis Wong Stadium
15 Hilo Harbor
16 Hilo International Airport

Included in the park is the small island called Moku ola, (also known as Coconut Island), connected to the park by a footbridge. It is a good place for a picnic, and some limited swimming. The name Moku ola literally means "island of life" in the Hawaiian language, since it was the site of an ancient temple dedicated to healing. There is a stone tower on the east side of the island which is the remnant of the old footbridge which was destroyed by a tsunami. From Coconut Island one has a great view of Hilo Bayfront, Downtown Hilo, and the rest of Hilo Bay. To the east, you can see the massive breakwater protecting Hilo Bay. It is located at coordinates 19°43′36″N 155°4′6″W. It is maintained by the County of Hawaii and non-profit Friends of Liliuokalani Gardens.

In 2021, a bronze sculpture by local artist, Henry Bianchini, was relocated from the main garden area to a nearby location in Isle Beach Park.

The park is a popular location for public events, exercise, and dog-walking.

== Gallery ==
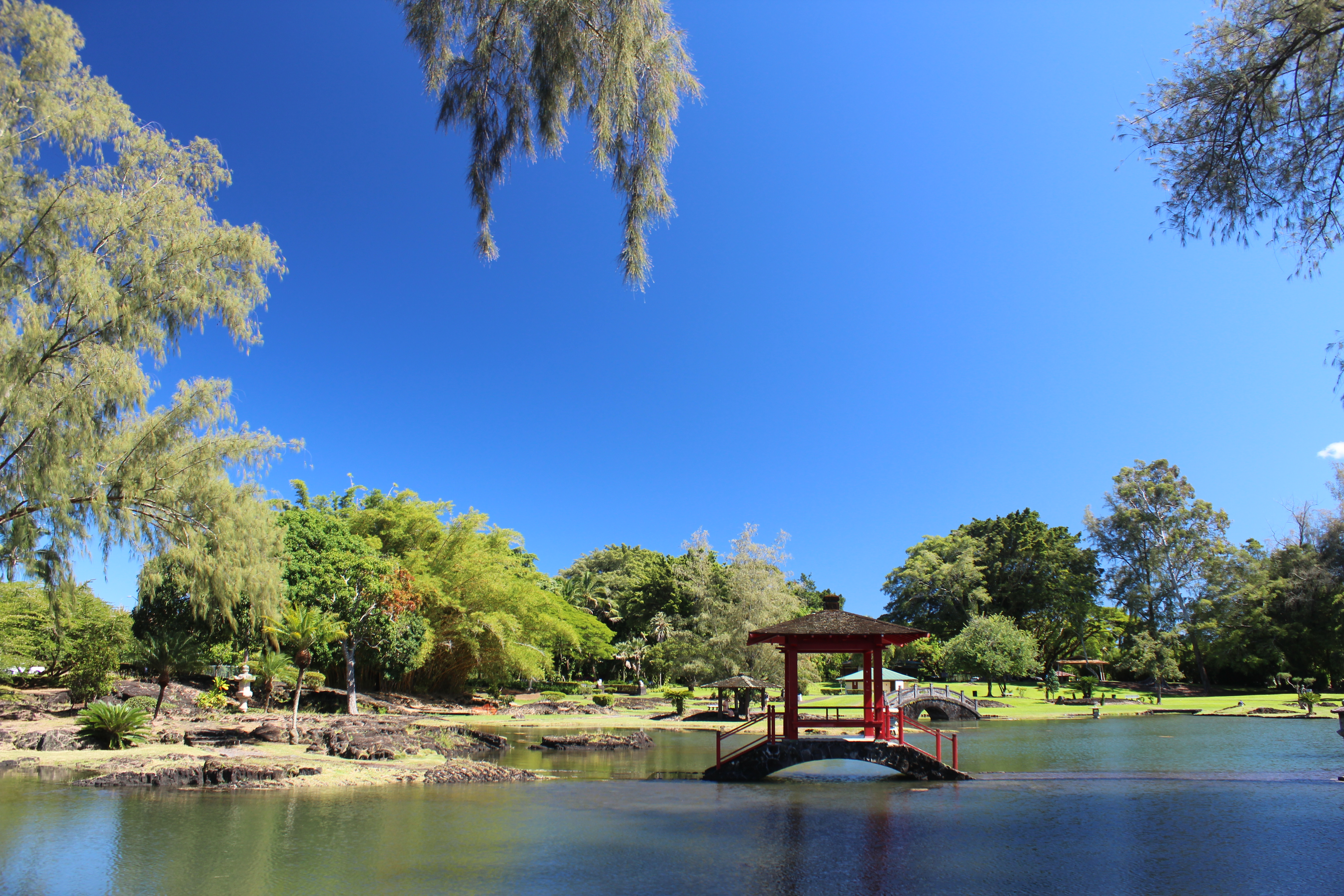
Pagoda and Torii in Liliu'okalani Gardens

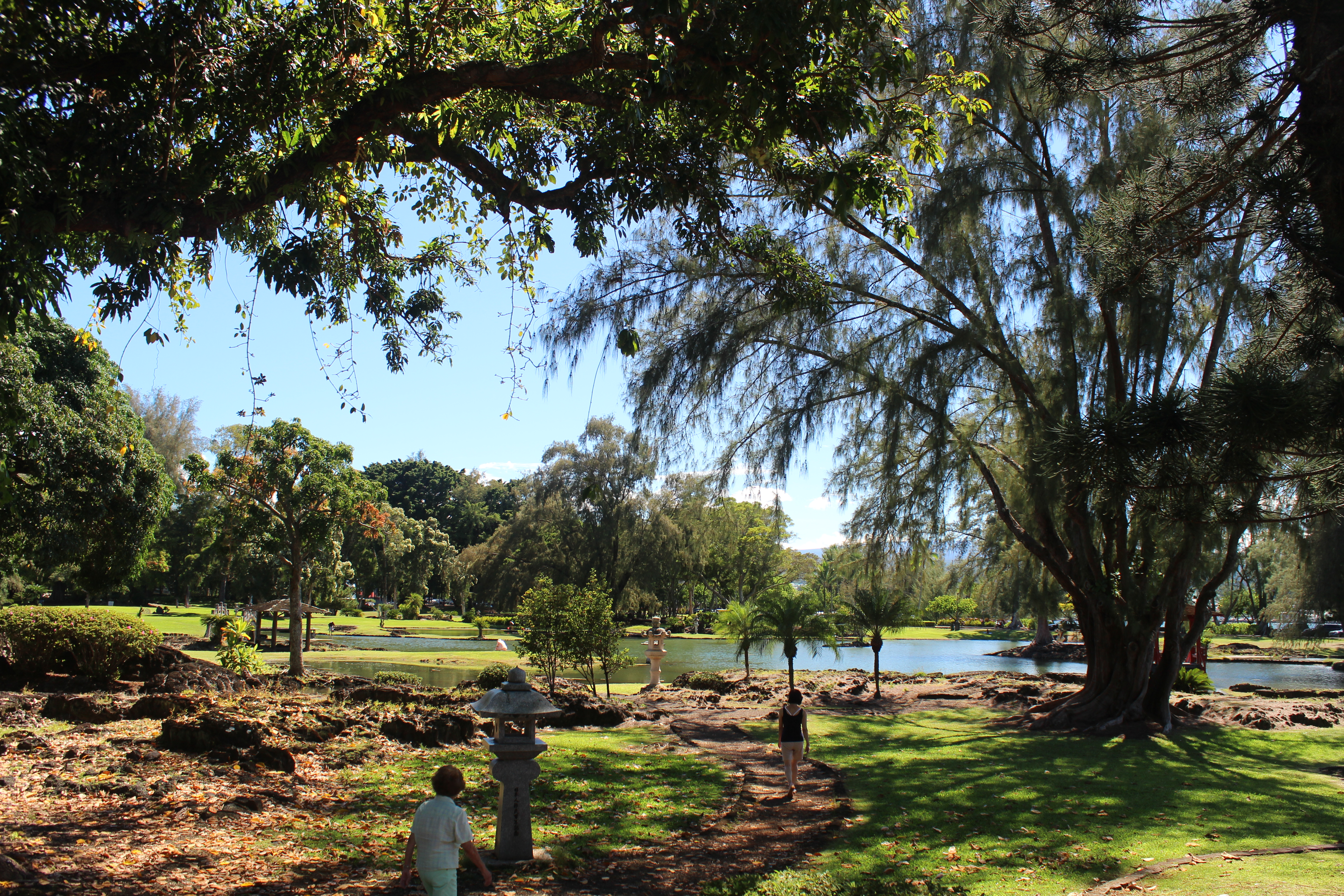
Banyan Tree and Bamboo at the Gardens

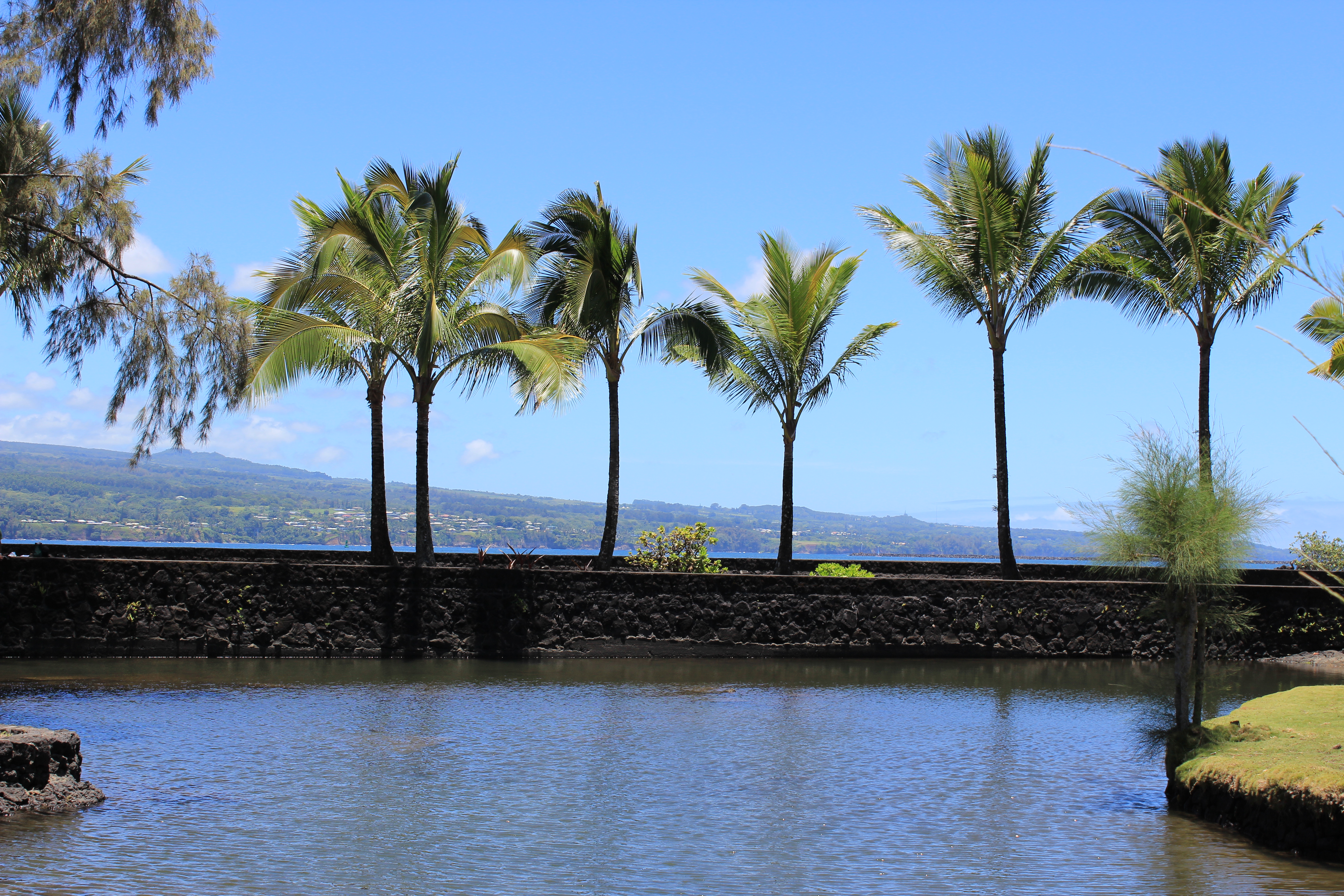
View looking across Hilo Bay towards the Hamakua Coast

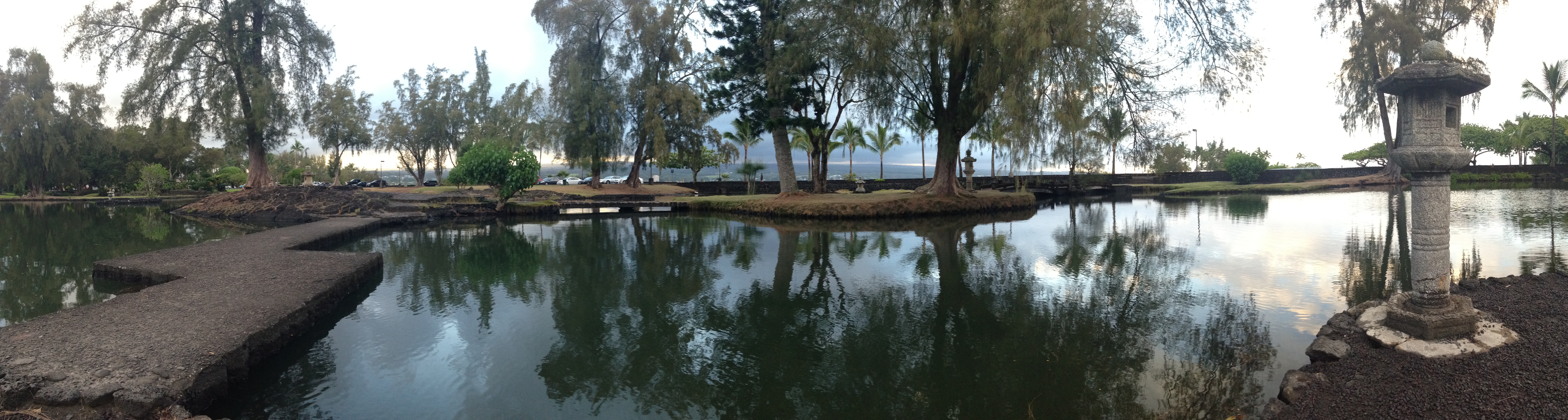
Panoramic view of some of the rock/water paths in Liliu'okalani Park in Hil

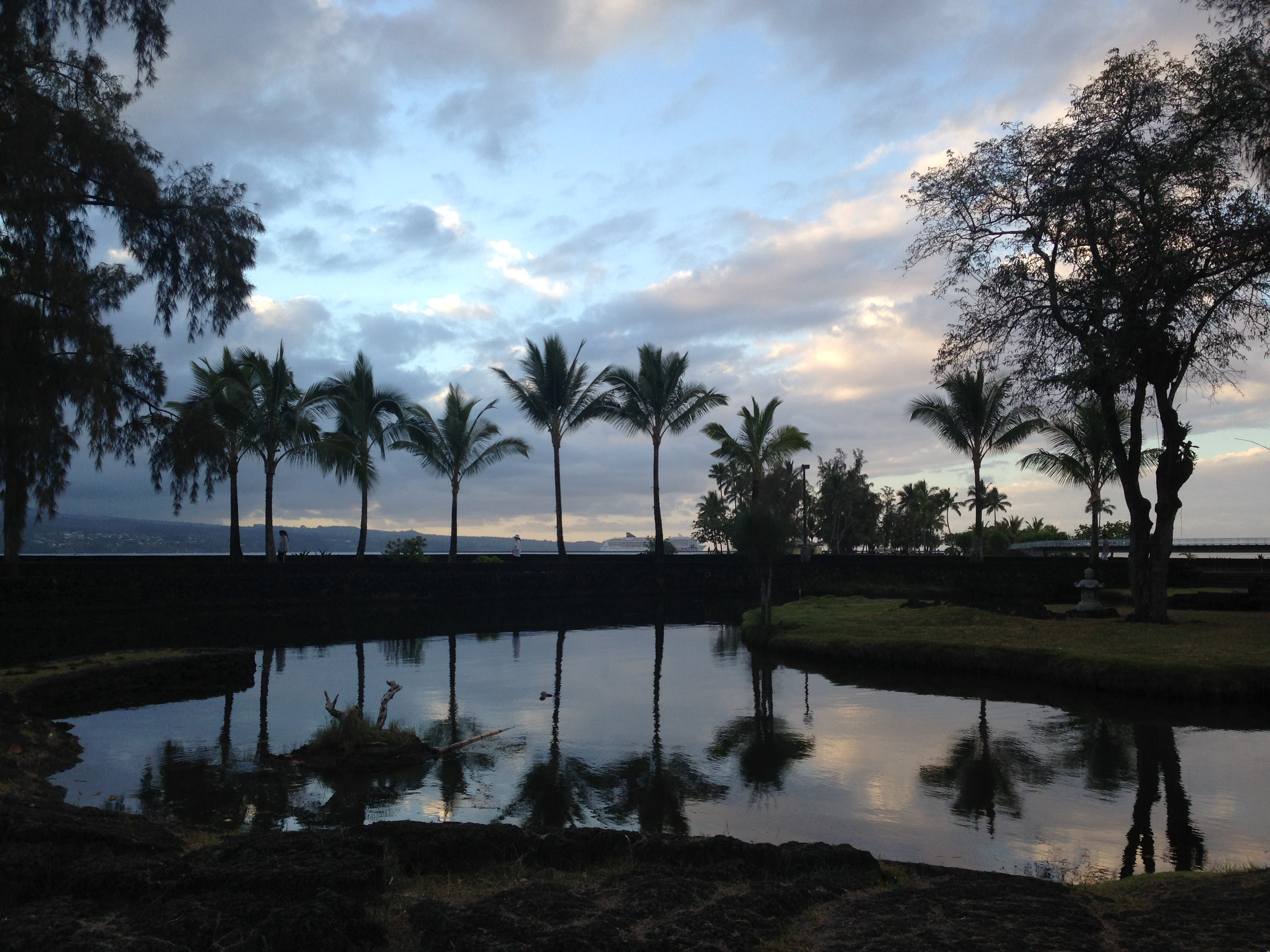
Sunset over Hilo from Liliu'okalani Park in Hilo

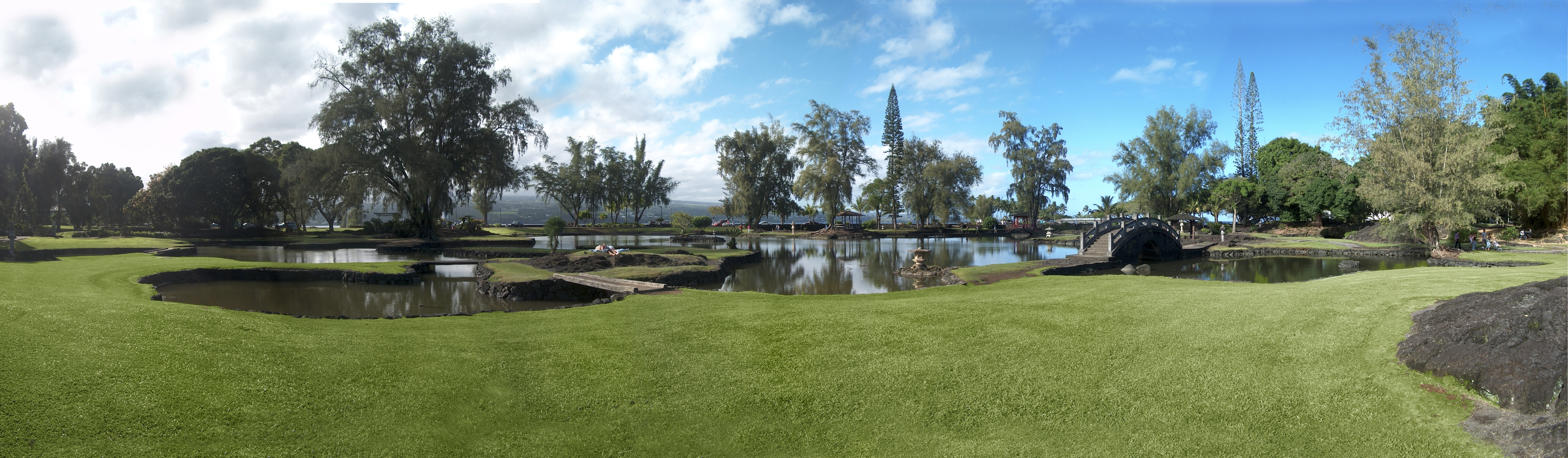
Panorama of Liliʻoukalani Park and Gardens in Hilo, Hawaii

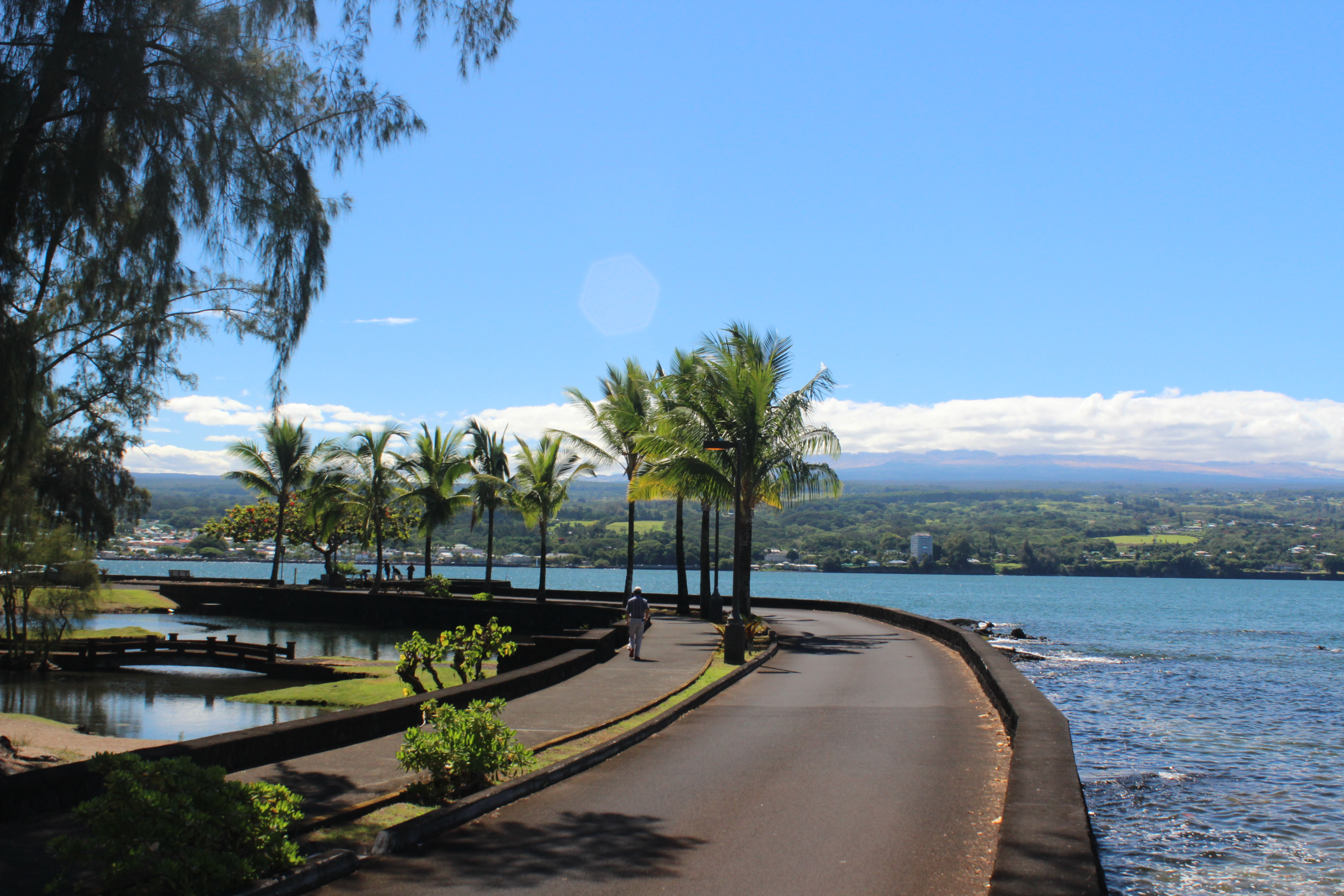
Hilo Bay and Hilo town from Liliu'okalani Gardens

== See also ==
- Liliʻuokalani Botanical Garden (located in Honolulu, Hawaii)
- List of botanical gardens in the United States
