= Coconut Island (Hawaiʻi County) =

Island in Hawaiʻi, United States

Mokuola
Nickname: Coconut Island
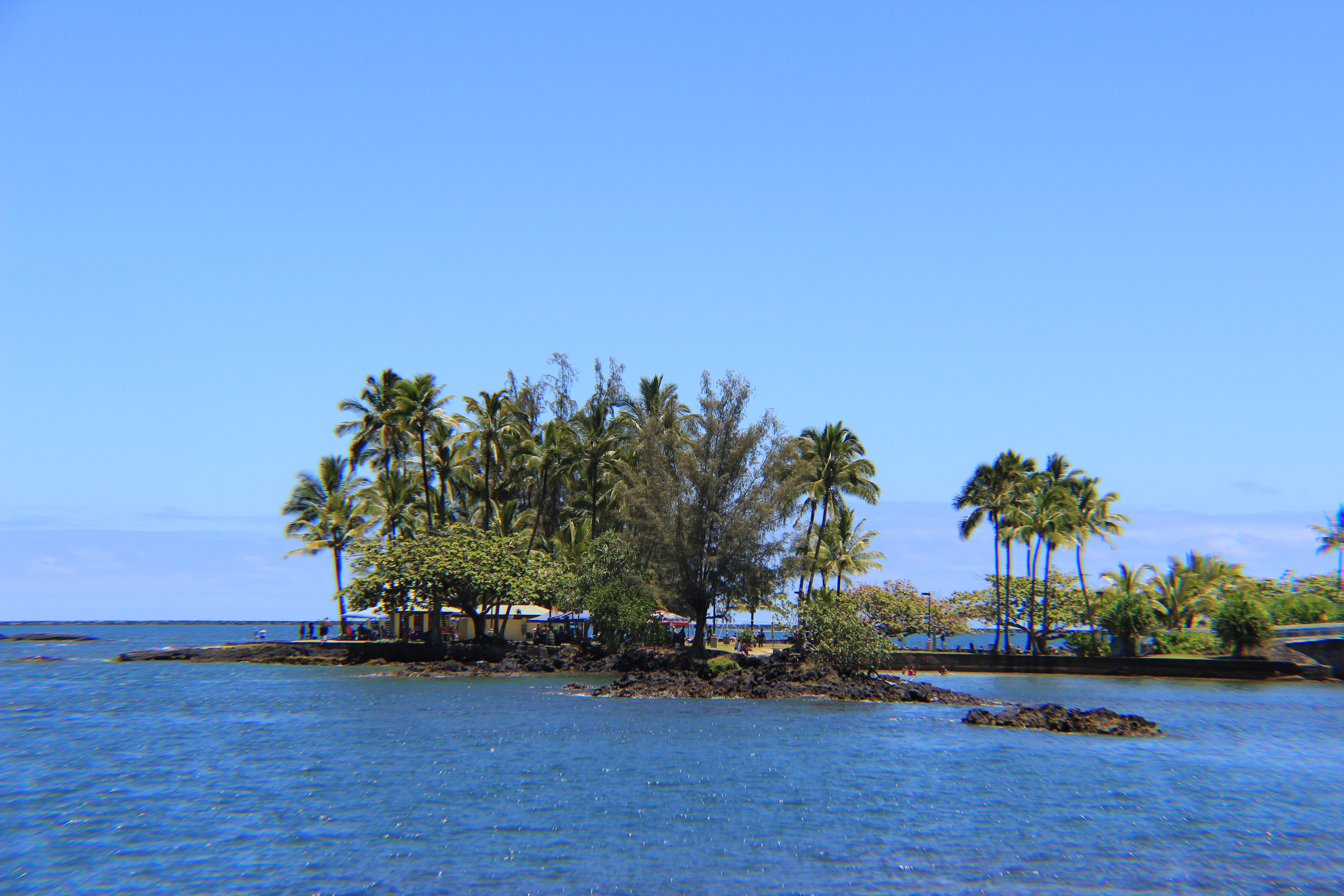
- View of Mokuola from Lili'uokalani Park

- Location of Mokuola in Hawaii

Geography
- Location: Hilo Bay
- Coordinates: 19°43′46″N 155°4′7″W
- Archipelago: Hawaiian Islands

Administration
- United States

Coconut Island, or Mokuola is a small island in Hilo Bay, just offshore from Lili'uokalani Park and Gardens, in Hilo, off the island of Hawaii. It is a small park with a large grassy field, picnic areas, restroom facilities, and a few tiny sandy beaches. A popular recreational activity is to jump off the tower into the waters of Hilo Bay.

In November 2025, the pedestrian bridge, which was the only connection between the island and the main island of Hawaii, collapsed as a county worker drove a mini-excavator across the structure, closing the popular Hilo park indefinitely.

Parks and attractions near Hilo Bay and downtown Hilo, Hawaii
- Points of interest
- Parks and open spaces
- Transportation
1 Lyman House Memorial Museum
2 Haili Church
3 Kalākaua Park / East Hawaii Cultural Center
4 Pacific Tsunami Museum
5 Moʻoheau County Park (Hele-On Bus Terminal) / S. Hata Building / Mokupāpapa Discovery Center
6 Russell Carroll Soccer Fields
7 Aupuni Center / County of Hawaiʻi offices
8 Hilo Bayfront Beach Park
9 Wailoa River State Recreation Area / Waiākea Pond
10 Coconut Island / Moku Ola
11 Queen Liliʻuokalani Park and Gardens / Banyan Drive
12 Grand Naniloa Hotel / Naniloa Golf Course
13 Reed's Bay Beach Park
14 Hoʻolulu Complex (Merrie Monarch Festival site): Afook-Chinen Civic Auditorium · Aunty Sally Kaleohano's Luʻau Hale · Edith Kanakaʻole Stadium · 'Sparky' Kawamoto Swim Stadium · Walter Victor Baseball Complex · Francis Wong Stadium
15 Hilo Harbor
16 Hilo International Airport

The name Mokuola translates as "healing island" or "island of life" from the Hawaiian language. Moku meaning "island" and ola meaning "life." It was the site of an ancient temple dedicated to healing. It is located off Banyan Drive.

Legend tells that anyone who was sick or feeling ill would be healed by swimming around Mokuola three times. In ancient times, Mokuola was a pu'uhonua (place of refuge), where natives or warriors could "redeem" themselves. Many native Hawaiians would also bury their children's piko (umbilical cords) under the flat rocks here, so the rats would not find them (piko are often considered sacred to Hawaiians, as they are the connection to their mothers and to their blood lines).

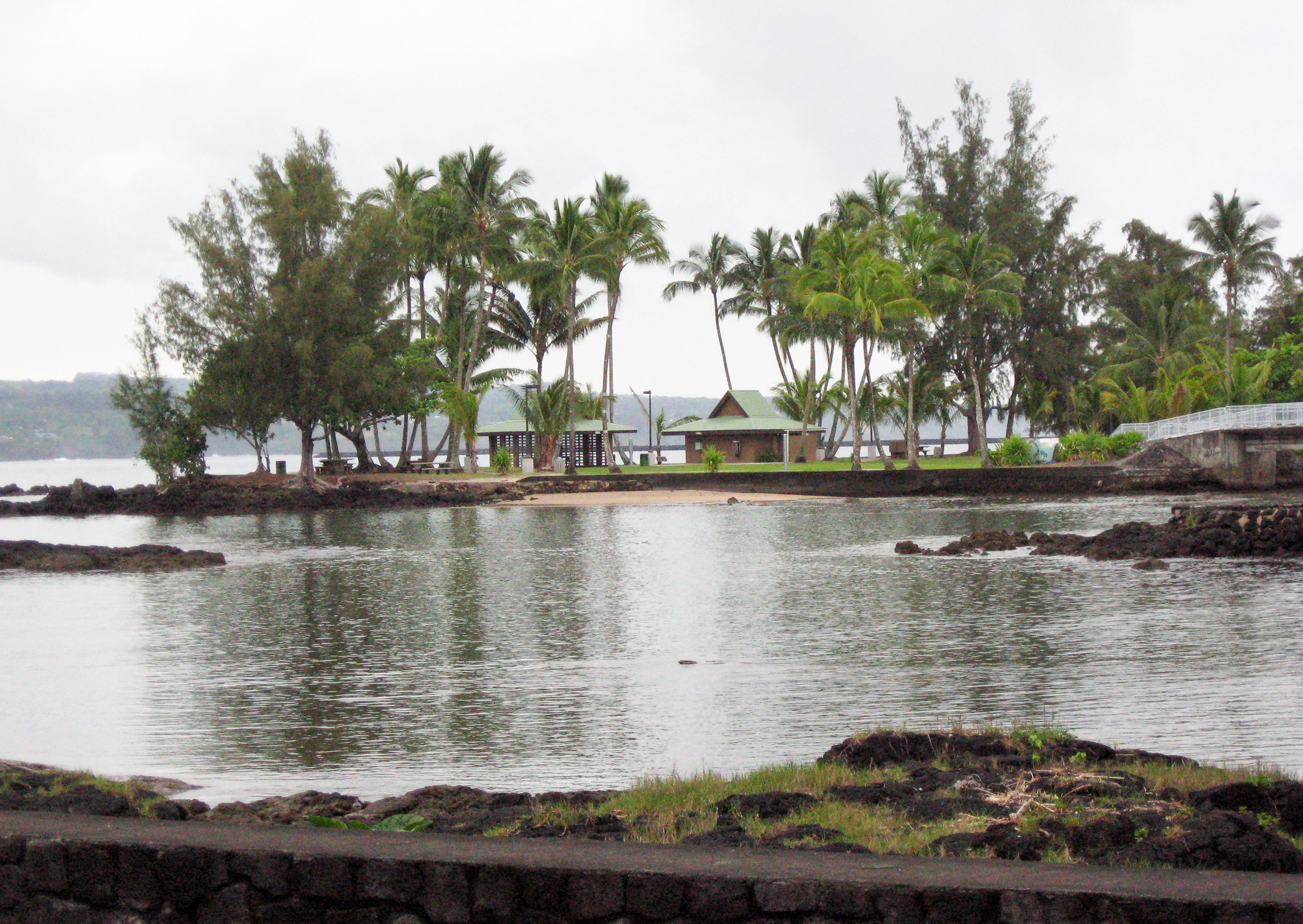
View of Mokuola from Lihiwai Street
