= EHCC =

EHCC may refer to:

- European Hill Climb Championship
- Elayn Hunt Correctional Center, a prison in St. Gabriel, Louisiana
- East Hawaiʻi Cultural Center
