= Kalākaua Park =

Town square in Hilo, Hawaii

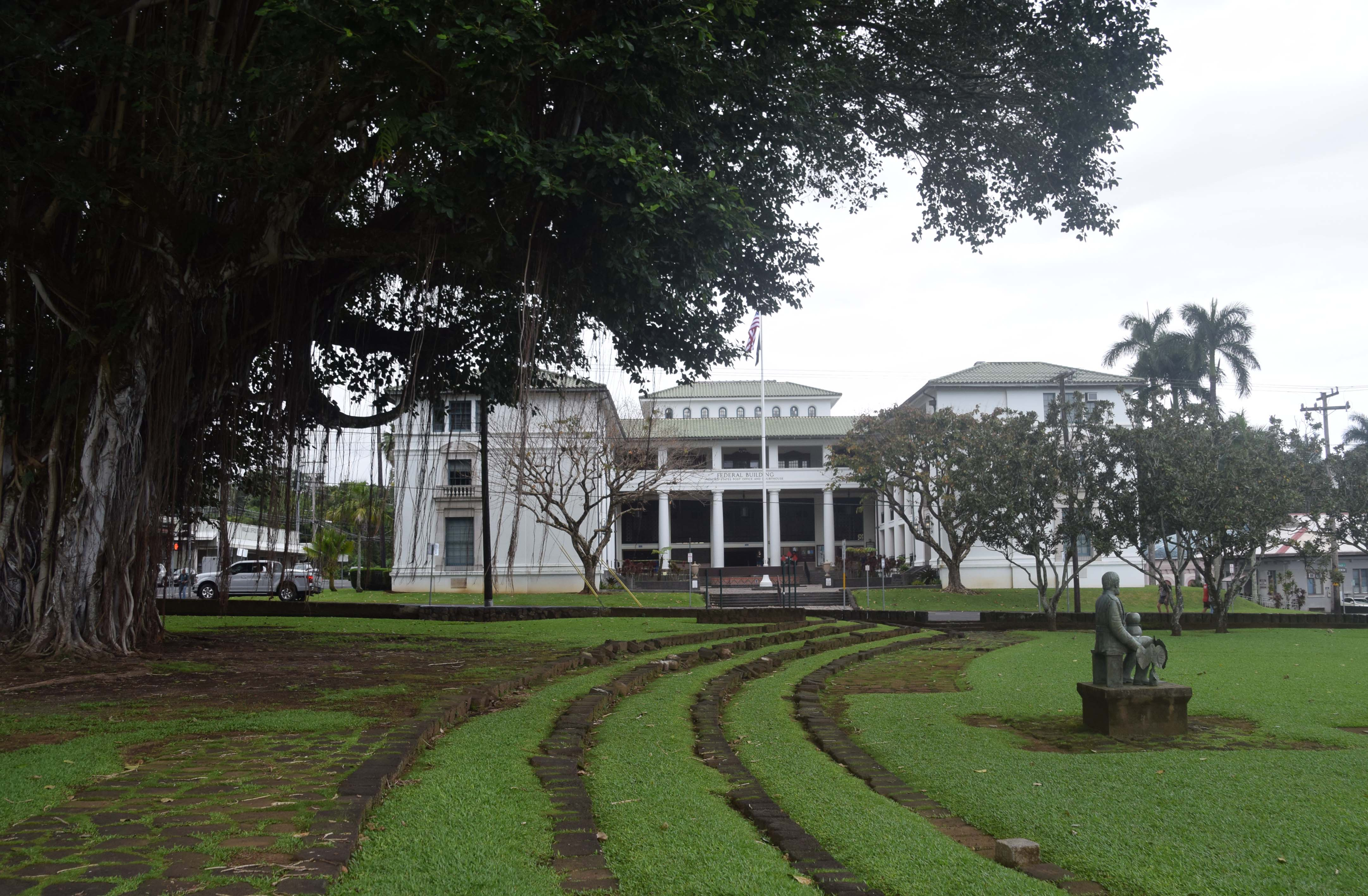
- Kalakaua Park, with the view of the Federal Building and U.S. Post Office (ZIP 96721) across Waianuenue Ave.
- Interactive map of Kalākaua Park
- Nearest city: Hilo, Hawaii
- Coordinates: 19°43′31″N 155°05′19″W
- Created: 1934

Kalākaua Park is the central "town square" of the city of Hilo, Hawaii. It is surrounded by historic buildings and includes a war memorial.

== History ==
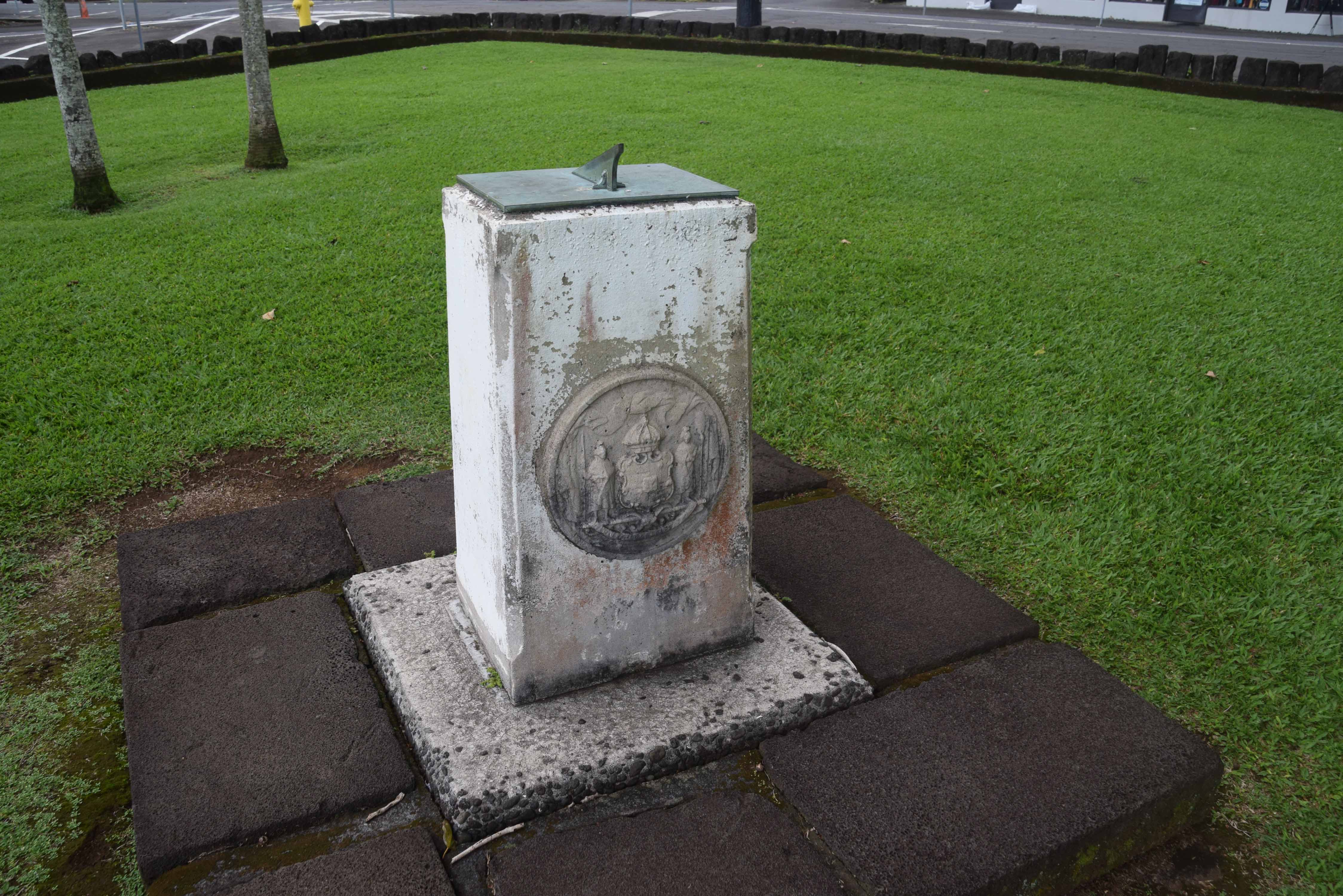
The sundial donated by King Kalakaua

The area was originally the site of the first Christian Mission in the area known as Waiakea Mission Station-Hilo Station in 1825; the missionaries had originally established their site on the seasonal flood plain of the Wailuku River, but they moved at the urging of Queen Kaʻahumanu. The land was ceded to the territorial government by King Kamehameha in 1848. Later, a grass house was built and served as the home of Sheriff J. H. Coney until he built a new house across King (now Kalakaua) Street in 1858, a site presently occupied by the East Hawaii Cultural Center (EHCC, a building completed in 1932 and previously used as the old police station and county courthouse). Coney's grass house was replaced by a prefabricated wooden courthouse built by a company in Bangor, Maine, which was erected in 1868; Queen Emma and King David Kalakaua read proclamations from the courthouse lanai, commemorated by a sundial erected in the former courthouse's courtyard in 1877 which is still present in the park.

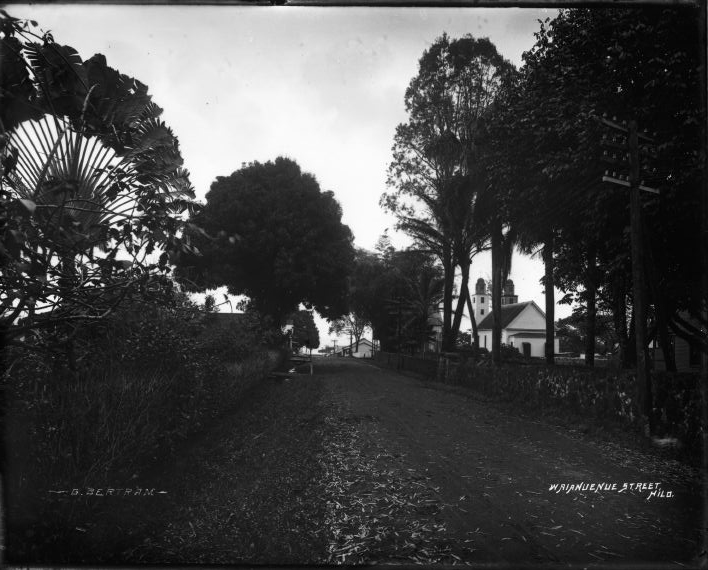
View northeast along Waianuenue Avenue towards Old Saint Joseph's Catholic Church (at the intersection of Waianuenue and Keawe), c.1880s, by Brother Bertram; the low perimeter wall bounding the area that would become Kalakaua Park is on the right side of this photograph.

Later it evolved into the equivalent of a New England town square, surrounded by important civic buildings, such as the District Courthouse and Police Station, and the U.S. Post Office and Office Building. In 1897, the courthouse wall was dismantled and the stones were reused in the structure for Waianuenue Avenue; in 1932, both the old county courthouse and Coney house (then being used as the county government building) were replaced with what is now EHCC, and the demolition of the 1868 courthouse began on November 14, 1932.

Hilo park commissioners Dr. Eugene W. Mitchell, Herbert Shipman, and Annabelle Ruddle began designing a park for the former county courthouse site shortly after clearing began, with the help of Robert O. Thompson and his wife Catherine (née Jones), landscape architects from Honolulu. The banyan tree at the west end would be retained and a shallow stage would be built using three stone-edged grass terraces, and a shallow pool measuring 150 ft × 15 ft (45.7 m × 4.6 m) would be built at the lower end of the park. Work began on the new park in April 1933, and was completed by February 1934.

During World War II, bomb shelters were built on the grounds; in March 1943, plans were started for a war memorial plaque on the site, and shortly after V-J Day, the bomb shelters were cleared and the pond was repaired and replanted. The bronze statue of King Kalakaua sculpted and cast by Henry Bianchini was dedicated on August 6, 1988, with a time capsule embedded in its base.

=== Federal Building ===
After annexing the Territory of Hawaii in 1898, the United States government made plans to build a Federal office building in Hilo, the second-largest city in the territory. However, funds were not available until 1913. Designed to include the post office at the time, it was built across Waianuenue from the present-day site of the park from 1915 to 1917. It was designed by Henry D. Whitfield, who was Andrew Carnegie's brother-in-law. It was in the Mediterranean neoclassic style with some modern touches such as open circulation with a large arcade. Unusual for Hawaii, it had a full basement, a raised first floor with high ceilings for the post office, a second floor for Federal court functions, and a clerestory band of oriel windows above the courtroom for natural lighting.

In 1936, an addition in a similar style of was designed by Louis A. Simon to result in a "U" shape with two three-story wings. These were opened in 1938. The courtyard contains a flag pole, a mosaic-tiled fountain, and two decorative urns. In 1978 most postal functions moved to a new building. In a 1979 interior renovation, the courthouse was converted to federal office space.

== Description ==
Parks and attractions near Hilo Bay and downtown Hilo, Hawaii
- Points of interest
- Parks and open spaces
- Transportation
1 Lyman House Memorial Museum
2 Haili Church
3 Kalākaua Park / East Hawaii Cultural Center
4 Pacific Tsunami Museum
5 Moʻoheau County Park (Hele-On Bus Terminal) / S. Hata Building / Mokupāpapa Discovery Center
6 Russell Carroll Soccer Fields
7 Aupuni Center / County of Hawaiʻi offices
8 Hilo Bayfront Beach Park
9 Wailoa River State Recreation Area / Waiākea Pond
10 Coconut Island / Moku Ola
11 Queen Liliʻuokalani Park and Gardens / Banyan Drive
12 Grand Naniloa Hotel / Naniloa Golf Course
13 Reed's Bay Beach Park
14 Hoʻolulu Complex (Merrie Monarch Festival site): Afook-Chinen Civic Auditorium · Aunty Sally Kaleohano's Luʻau Hale · Edith Kanakaʻole Stadium · 'Sparky' Kawamoto Swim Stadium · Walter Victor Baseball Complex · Francis Wong Stadium
15 Hilo Harbor
16 Hilo International Airport

The park was named in honor of King David Kalākaua who ruled the Kingdom of Hawaii from 1874 to 1891, often called the "Merrie Monarch" because of his revival of Ancient Hawaiian song and dance. The Merrie Monarch Festival is a major cultural event held annually in Hilo. He dedicated the park around 1877.

It is in the block bounded by Waianuenue Avenue and Kalākaua Avenue, and Kinoʻole Street and Keawe Street. Kinoʻole Street, originally Pitman Street, was named for Kinoʻole o Liliha Pitman.

=== Banyan tree ===
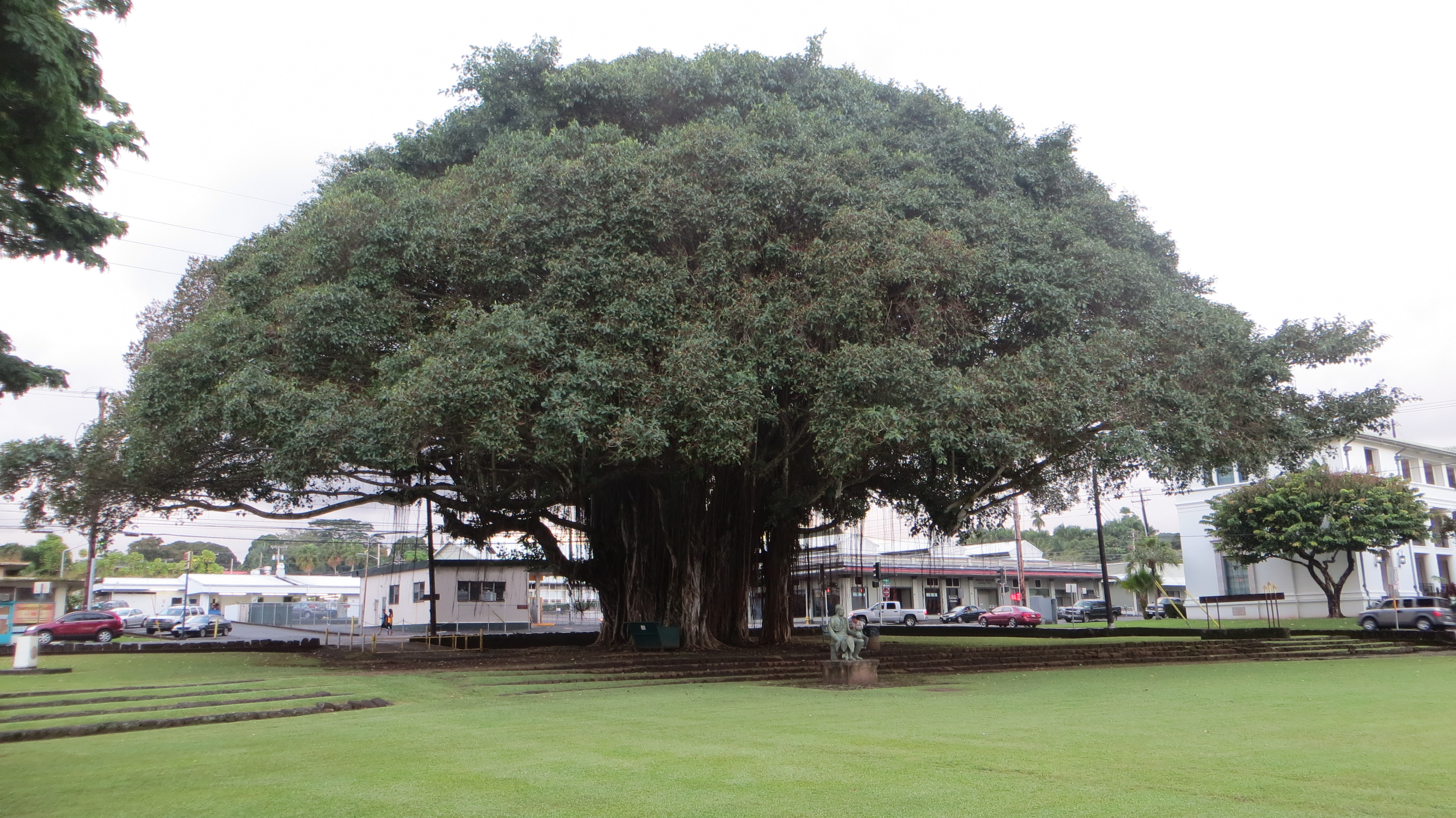
Banyan tree at Kalakaua Park

The banyan tree at the west end of the park was one of two originally planted by Sheriff and later Postmaster Luther Severance in 1882, although newspaper articles in 1964 credit King Kalakaua with the planting. Severance lived across Waianuenue from the 1868 courthouse; the home itself, built approximately 1866 or 1867, had been moved to the intersection of Kilauea and Keawe with the construction of the Federal Building. One of the trees was moved 5 mi (8.0 km) to Kaumana by Sheriff George Williams when Waianuenue was widened. It has survived at least one attempt to cut it down after it damaged a water main.

=== Kalākaua statue ===
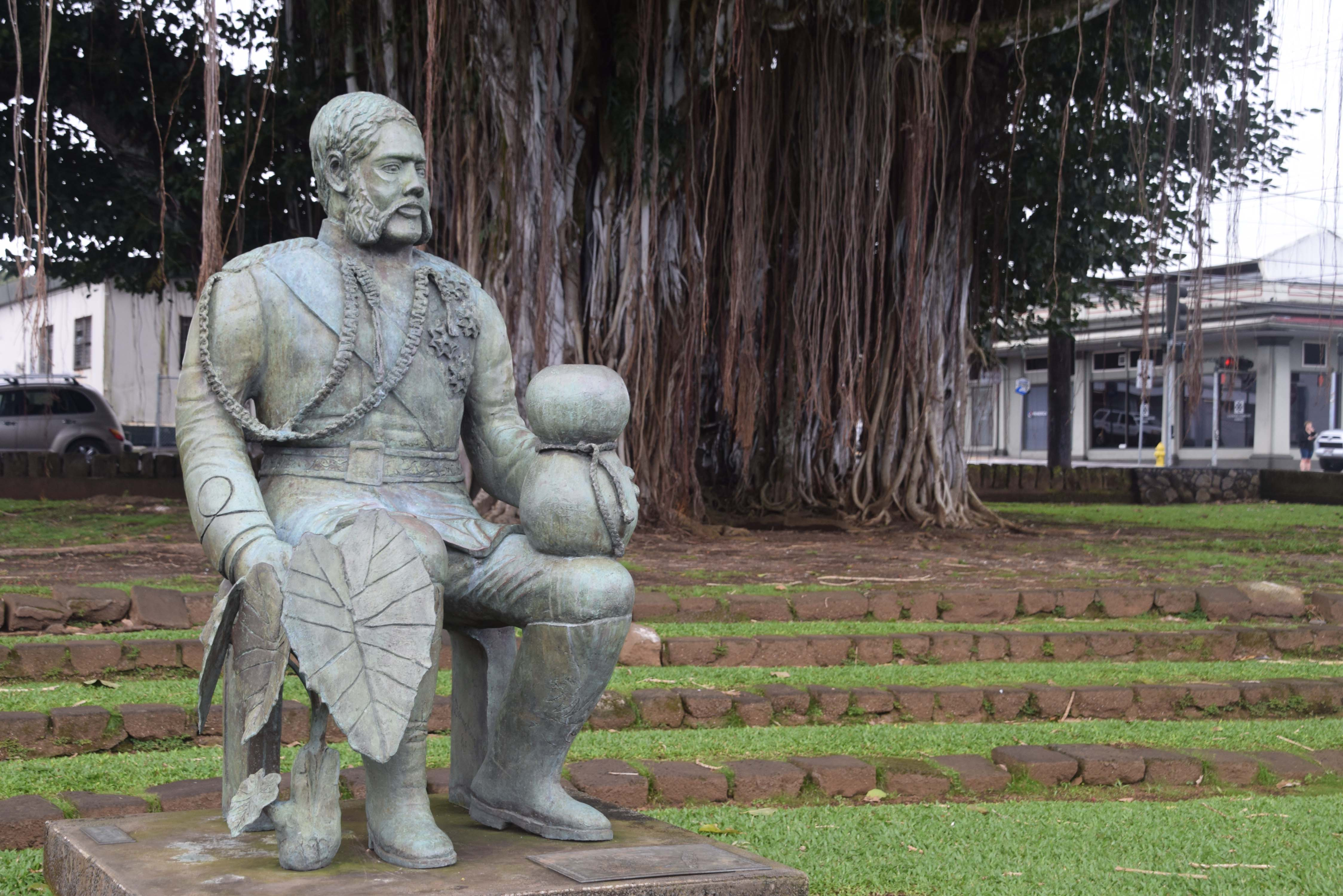
The Statue of King Kalakaua

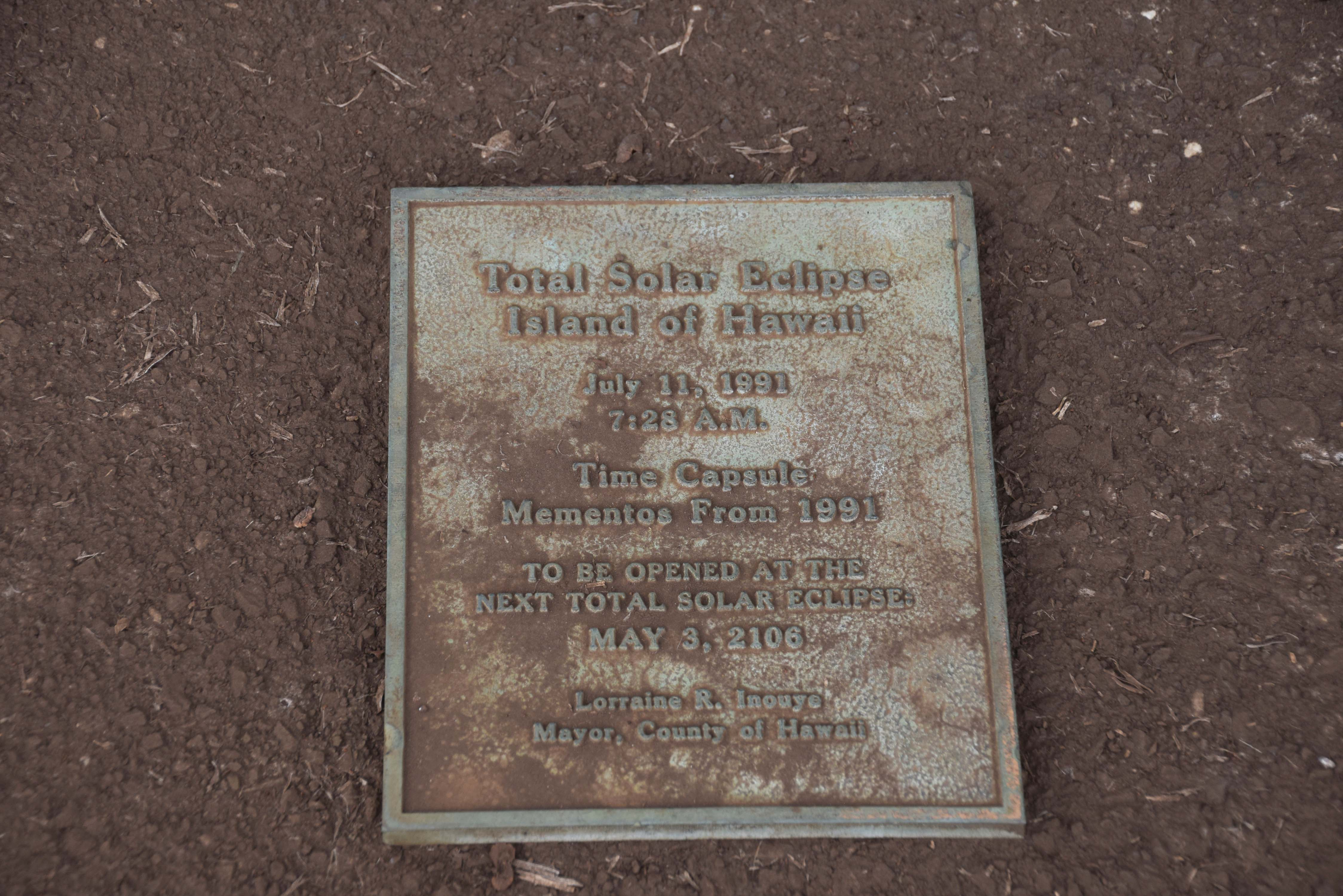
The time capsule of 1991 to be opened in 2106

A bronze statue of Kalākaua in the middle of the park holds a taro leaf and ipu, a gourd used in ancient chants; the taro leaf symbolizes the bond between native Hawaiians and the aina (land), while the ipu refers to the king's revival of ancient culture. The statue was dedicated on August 6, 1988; it was sculpted by Henry Bianchini using the lost wax process. Bianchini chose a seated pose for the statue for two reasons: "First, he would be closer to the people, and I thought he would have liked that. Also, besides offering a more interesting composition, visually he would not be lost in the branches of the overhead Banyan tree as he would have been if he were standing."

Donations totaling $40,000 were raised for the statue. After Bianchini was selected as the sculptor in January 1988, he was given a hard deadline of July 1 to complete the statue; portions of the statue were cast in Bianchini's Hawaii studio and others in California because he was unable to receive sufficient supplies in Hawaii. It took him 17 days to assemble, weld, grind, polish, and patina the separate segments.

A second time capsule was buried in 1991 during a total solar eclipse, to be opened in the next one to be visible here.

=== War memorial ===
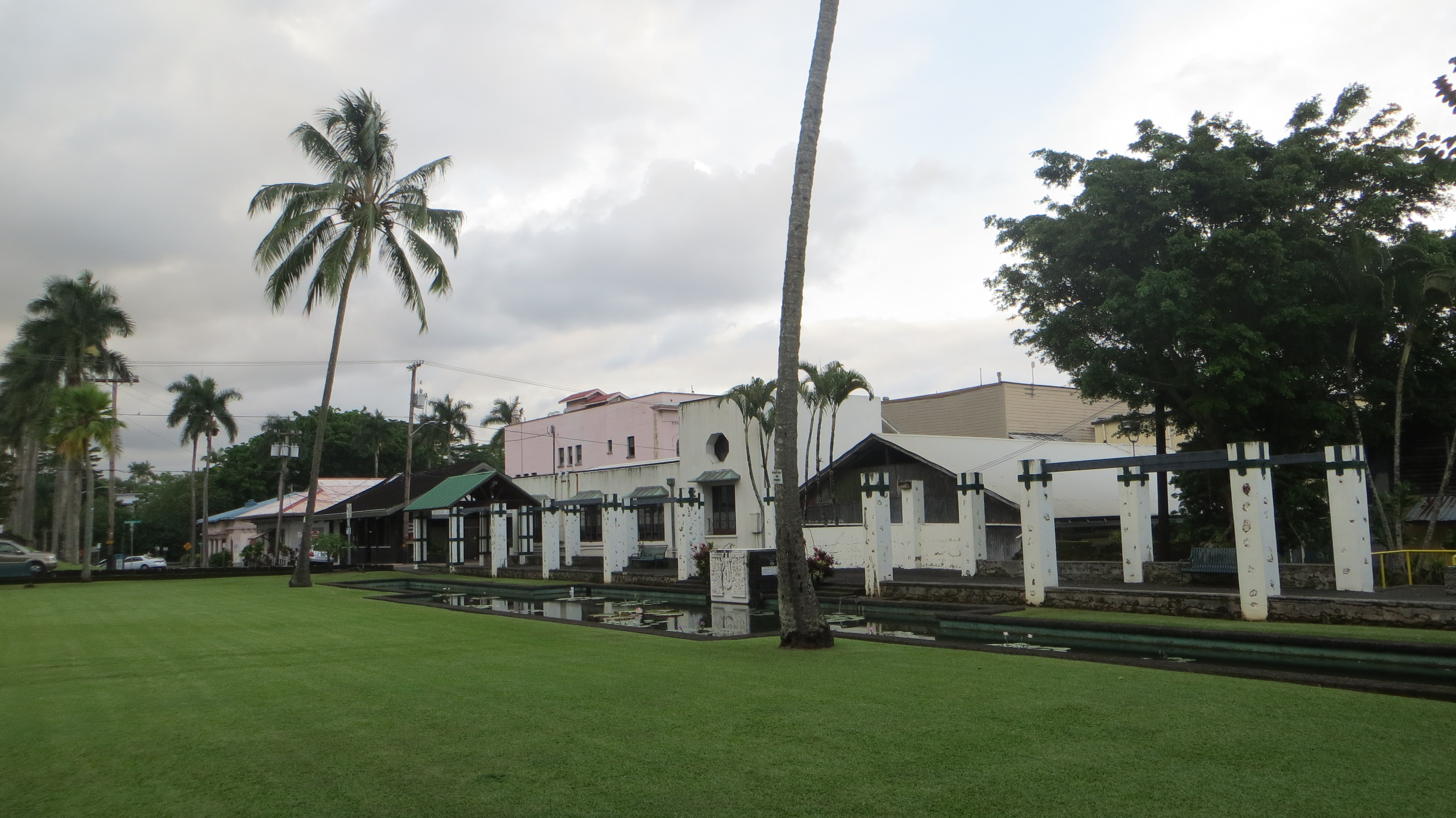
War Memorial monument and lily pond

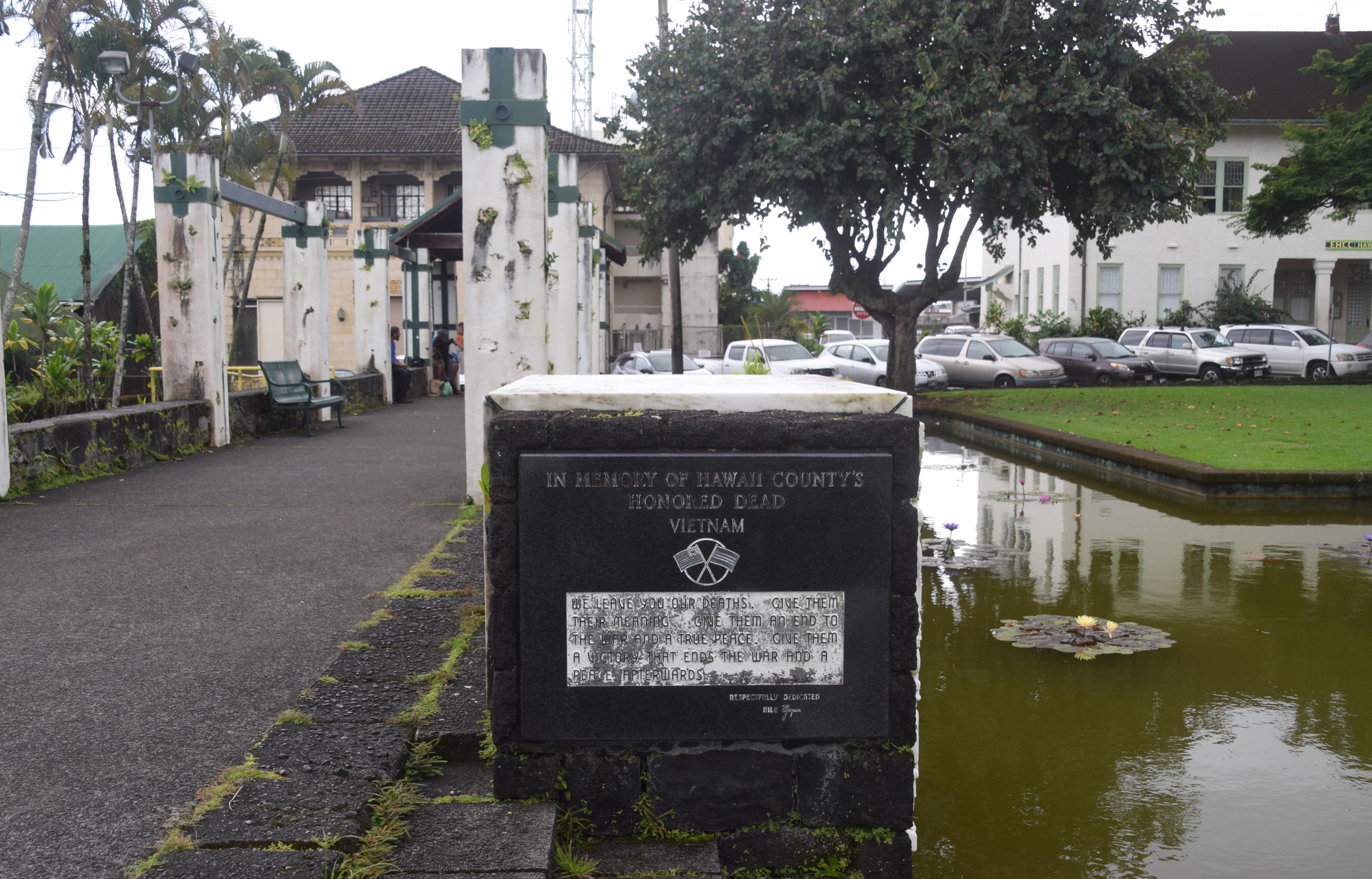
The Hawaii County War Memorial

A Vermont Danby Imperial white marble monument to those who died in World War II from the Island of Hawaiʻi was conceived in 1943 by the Hawaii Island Chamber of Commerce and completed in 1948 at the east end of the park. Charles William Dickey Associates were chosen as architects. They commissioned Sculptor Roy King of Honolulu to design and carve the monument. Donations came from the Hawaii American Legion Veterans, and Hawaii County. It is 10 feet (3.0 m) long, 4 feet (1.2 m) wide, and 6 feet (1.8 m) high. 157 names of soldiers and sailors from Hawaiʻi Island killed during World War II were inscribed on top. A lily pond reflects one side showing a central figure, a winged fighting man representing all combat forces. His wings signify protection and peace. On either side of him are people of the world living together in harmony. The back is inscribed "That their spirit may guide us to an ever living peace among all mankind." Since its completion, the names of those killed during the Korean and Vietnam Wars have been added.

At dedication October 31, 1948, Harold R. Warner, chairman of the Hawaii Island Chamber of Commerce memorial committee, turned the monument over to county chairman Clem A. Akina. Hundreds of residents stood in silence as Shojiro Takayama, who lost two sons in World War II, unveiled the monument. Veterans of the 442nd Infantry Regiment and 100th Infantry Battalion turned out. Unveiling ceremonies were followed by a procession to military services at the Veteran's cemetery at (called Homelani) for four war dead returned from cemeteries in southern France and Italy. Maj. Hiro Higuchi, Army chaplain, formerly with the 442nd regiment officiated at the military services.

Relatives of the following war dead attended the unveiling ceremonies: Pfc. Satoshi Matsuoka, Pfc. Toshiaki Morimoto, Pvt. Setsuo Nagano, and Pfc. James K. Okamoto.

Two plaques were added to opposite ends of the monument. One in memory of Hawaii County's honored dead from the Korean War inscribed "Our deaths are not ours, they are yours. They will mean what you make them. Whether our lives and our deaths were for peace and a new hope or for nothing we cannot say. It is you who must say this." The other in memory of Hawaii County's honored dead of the Vietnam War inscribed "We leave you our deaths. Give them their meaning. Give them an end to the war and a true peace. Give them a victory that ends the war and a peace afterwards." Because of these additions, this monument is often referred to as the Korean War Memorial.

The pond, which has a capacity of 50,000 US gal (190,000 L; 42,000 imp gal), was restored in 1989 and 2012. A multi-color lighted fountain was proposed for the pond in the early 1970s, but met considerable resistance.
