= Henry Bianchini =

Hawaiian artist

Henry Bianchini (born 1935) is a Hawaiian-based sculptor, painter and printmaker. His art career spans over fifty years, and has multiple public sculptures featured in the state of Hawaii and in collections internationally. His art pieces have been represented in multiple solo, group, invitational and juried shows.

== Biography ==
Henry Bianchini was born in 1935 in San Diego, California and is the oldest of six siblings. One of his brothers, Victor Bianchini, is a notable retired judge living in San Diego. In 1965, Henry Bianchini married Diane Denton. Soon after, they built a 30-foot trimaran, "Island Dancer". Henry Bianchini sailed on that boat for seven years, making his way to Hawaii. After arriving in August 1969, he witnessed the Mauna Ulu Eruption, which gave Henry a unique sense of place. After sailing throughout the islands, he and Diane settled in Opihikao in the Puna District of Hawai'i in 1971. Henry and Diane have three children, Theo, Frank and Allegra.

== Career ==
Henry Bianchini uses a variety of processes, including casting, welding, carving, painting and printmaking. His works utilize a number of materials, including native Hawai'ian wood, stone, concrete, steel and casting in bronze. In 1984, he set up a foundry at his studio in Puna, and created a number of sculptures there, including bronze and glass, using the lost wax process.

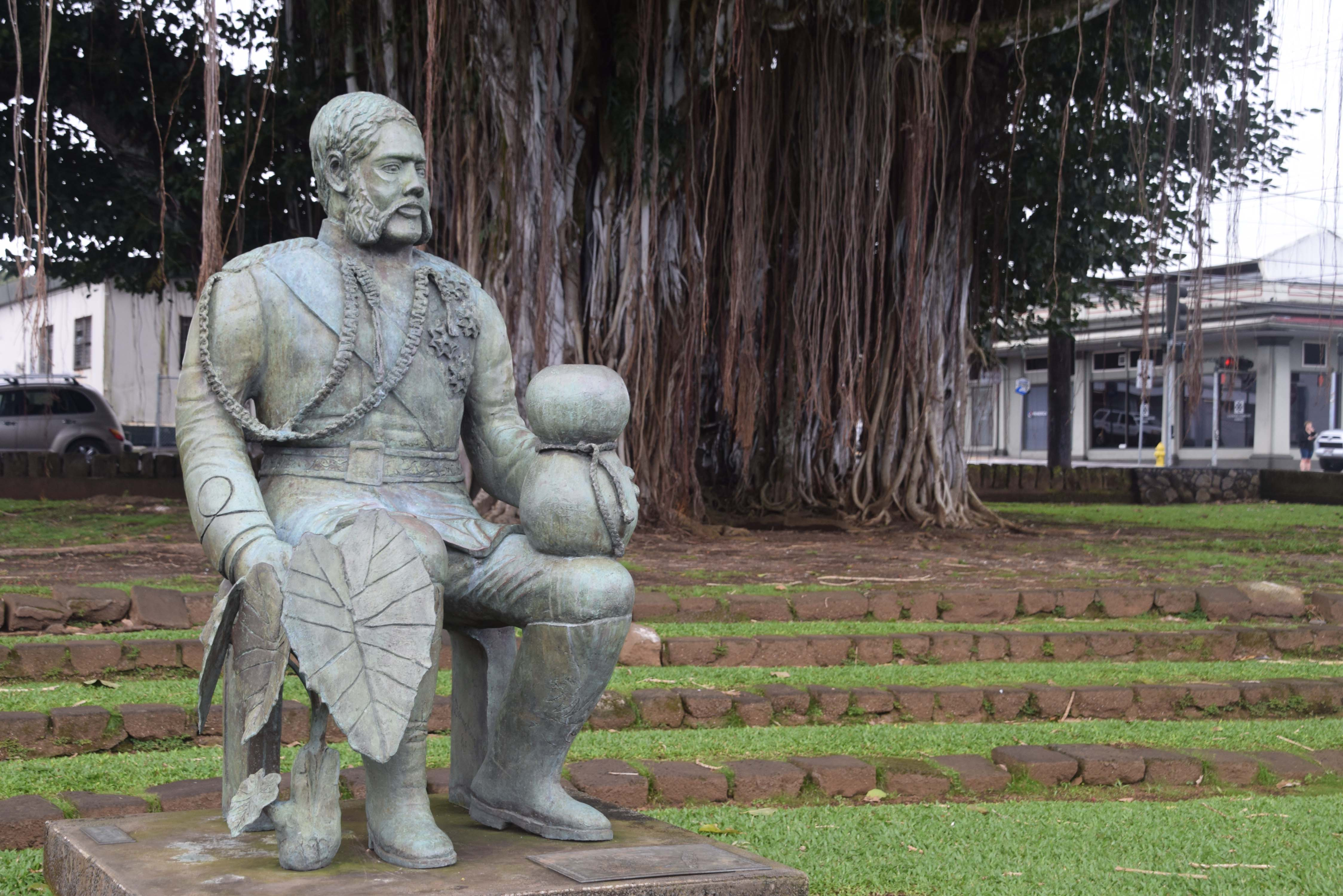
"King Kalakaua"; sculpture created by Henry Bianchini.

In 1988, the Hawaiʻi Groundwater and Geothermal Resources Center (HGGRC) provided an Energy Extension Service Geothermal Grant to Henry Bianchini for a Silica Bronze Project. That same year, Bianchini's bronze statue of King David Kalakaua was dedicated on August 6 in Hilo's Kalakaua Park.

Henry Bianchini's first "one-man show" was in the Hilo Public Library's main lobby area in 1974. Bianchini was featured in a 40-year retrospective at the East Hawai'i Cultural Center in 2010. Afterwards, he donated one of the exhibition's sculptures, "Involuntary Journey", to the Hilo Public Library.

Photographer Brett Weston and Henry Bianchini were featured together in the Spectrum Hawaii documentary "Light in Art"(1989), and one of Weston's photographs of a Bianchini sculpture was included in a limited edition book called "Brett Weston At One Hundred".

Key artistic influences include Hawaiian art, culture, mythology and modernism.

== Notable works ==
- Ho'okamalani (1985), Kaiser Permanente Moanalua Medical Center, Oahu, Hawaii; cast bronze (60" H)
- King David Kalakaua (1988), Kalakaua Park, Hilo, Hawai'i; cast bronze (57" H)
- The Dance (1990), Grand Wailea Resort and Spa, Maui, Hawaii; cast bronze (72" H)
- Enlightening the Spirit (Ho`ona`auao) (1999), Haaheo Elementary School, Hilo, Hawai'i; stainless steel and concrete
- Strength in Diversity (2001), Ernest Bowen De Silva Elementary School, Hilo, Hawai'i; cast concrete and cast glass
- A Plea For Peace (2013), University Synagogue, Brentwood, CA
- Involuntary Journey (2013), Hilo Public Library, Hilo, Hawai'i; aluminium and stainless steel (74" H)
- Hokua (To Lift Up) (2017), Mililani Middle School, Cafeteria, Mililani, Oahu, Hawaii; bronze and concrete (11' H)
- Ho‘omalule ‘Upena Kiloi' or Metamorphosis of a Net Fisherman (2021), Isle Beach Park, near Liliʻuokalani Park and Gardens, Hilo, Hawai'i; cast bronze (57" H)
