= Federal Building, United States Post Office and Courthouse (Hilo, Hawaii) =

Historic Place in Hawaii County, Hawaii

- U.S. Post Office and Office Building
- U.S. National Register of Historic Places
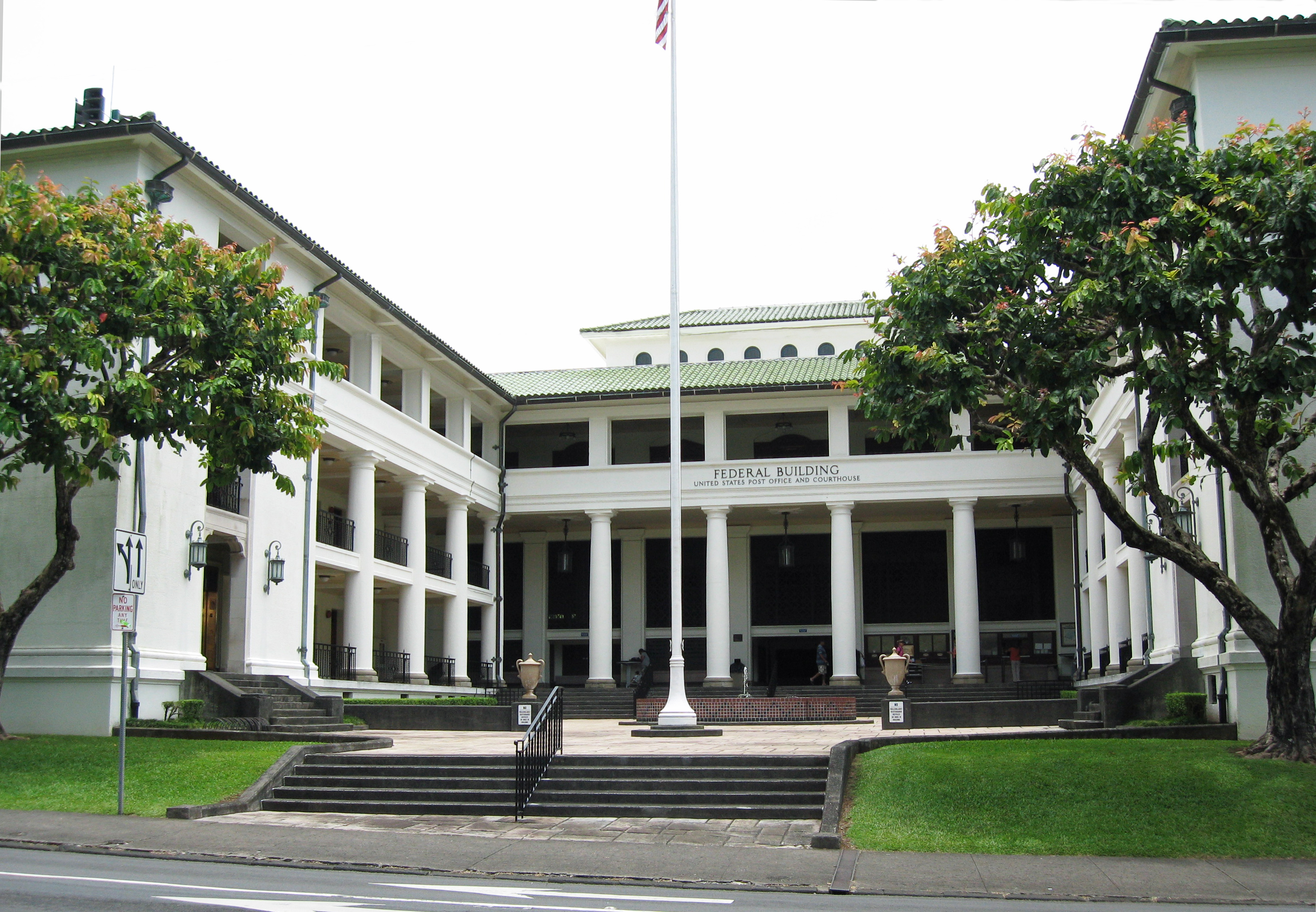
- Hilo Federal Building

- Location within Hawaii
- Map showing the location of U.S. Post Office and Office Building, Hilo
- Location: Hilo, Hawaii
- Coordinates: 19°43′32″N 155°5′20″W
- Area: 1-acre (0.40 ha)
- Built: 1915
- Architect: Henry D. Whitfield; Louis A. Simon
- Architectural style: Classical Revival
- NRHP reference No.: 74000708
- Added to NRHP: October 1, 1974

The Federal Building, U.S. Post Office and Courthouse in Hilo, Hawaii is a former courthouse of the United States District Court for the District of Hawaii. Completed in 1917 and expanded in the 1930s, the building was listed in the National Register of Historic Places in 1974.

== Building history ==
Prior to the annexation of the islands by the United States in 1898, Hilo was a thriving educational and commercial center on Hawaii, the largest of the Hawaiian Islands. Flourishing agricultural enterprises were served by railroads and harbors that facilitated trade with both the continental United States and East Asia. Postal services in Hilo commenced in 1858. When the Hawaiian Islands became a territory of the United States in 1900, officials wanted to expand postal and court facilities for the second-largest city in the territory. By 1913, the Hilo Board of Trade and the territory's governmental representative secured US$200,000 for a federal building.

New York architect Henry Whitfield designed the new building in 1915. Whitfield, who was the brother-in-law of Andrew Carnegie, had just completed the design for the Honolulu Carnegie Library. Whitfield designed the building in the Mediterranean Renaissance Revival style, which blends traditional classical architecture with features more suited to a tropical climate. The building was one of the first in Hawaii constructed using reinforced concrete, a technology that was common on the mainland. Construction was completed and the building occupied in 1917. It originally functioned as a courthouse, post office, and custom house. Other tenants included the Immigration Bureau, Agricultural Extension Service, Weather Bureau, and Internal Revenue Service.

By the 1930s, tenants required more space and two wings were added to the building between 1936 and 1938. Louis A. Simon, supervising architect of the US Treasury, designed the wings in a style compatible with that of the original building. The building was added to the National Register of Historic Places listings on the island of Hawaii on October 1, 1974 as site 74000708. In 1978, most postal functions moved to a new location, and the following year the Third Circuit Court vacated the third floor, which was converted into offices.

The structure is located on the northern edge of downtown bounded by Waianuenue Avenue, Wailuku Drive, and Kinoole and Kekaulike streets at 154 Waianuenue Avenue (Route 200), 19°43′32″N 155°5′20″W, on Kalakaua Park square. Across the square is the historic former District Courthouse and Police Station.

== Architecture ==
Whitfield's design blends classically inspired forms and motifs with features that are suitable for the warm Hawaiian climate. It is particularly noteworthy for its use of reinforced concrete, and it is one of the earliest buildings in the area to be constructed of permanent materials.

The reinforced concrete building is covered with painted stucco. The original building was rectangular, and the wing additions extend forward from the facade to form a U-shape. The facade is organized around a central courtyard. The building is three stories in height with a penthouse. Open-air loggias divided into three distinct levels face the courtyard and provide occupants with pleasant views and circulating air currents. The loggias also function as exterior corridors and provide primary circulation for occupants. One of the building's most appealing features is a two-story colonnade supported by monumental Tuscan columns. The colonnade faces the courtyard and supports the loggia on the first and second stories, while simple, square piers support the third-level loggia. Wrought-iron balusters are located on the first and second floors on portions of the colonnade. Decorative elements within the courtyard, including colorful mosaic tiles and urns, emphasize the Mediterranean Renaissance Revival style of the building, which blends classical and exotic motifs. Wrought-iron light fixtures are located on the building, and a wrought-iron grille with a gilded eagle tops the entrance to the postal lobby.

The exterior is divided into horizontal zones by water tables and stringcourses, a feature common to Renaissance Revival architecture. Classically inspired limestone surrounds highlight prominent features, such as windows and entrances, on the wings. Another colonnade (now enclosed with operable windows) is located on the rear. The penthouse contains a clerestory band of windows, that admits light into the third story. Five skylights, including one on the penthouse roof, illuminate the interior. The roof is covered with green glazed tiles.

The majority of interior spaces open onto the loggias, which provide necessary air circulation. The original postal service spaces on the first level contain gray-veined, white marble floors. Walls and ceilings are covered with painted plaster. Changes to the interior integrated new technology and accommodated changing uses of the building. Elevators have been added over time, including the island's first passenger elevator in 1950. After the courts vacated the building in 1978, the courtroom was transformed into office space. Total floor area is 50,346 square feet (4,677.3 m^{2}).

Although landscaping was designed as part of initial construction, much of the plan was not executed until the wings were built. The grounds are lushly planted with numerous native plants with retaining walls of indigenous lava stone. On Memorial Day in 1922, the American Legion planted 17 royal palms along Kekaulike Street to commemorate Hawaiian citizens who died in World War I.

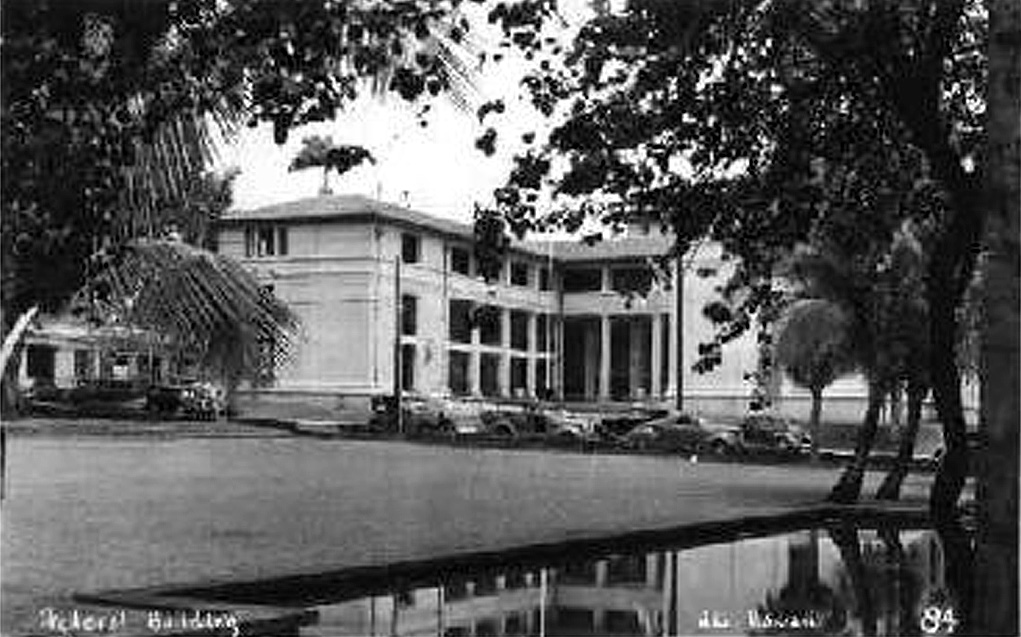
Historical picture from the General Services Administration

== Significant events ==
- 1898: United States annexes Hawaii
- 1915-1917: Federal Building, U.S. Post Office and Courthouse constructed
- 1936-1938: Three-story wings constructed
- 1974: Building listed in the National Register of Historic Places
- 1978: Main post office vacates building
- 1979: Third Circuit Court vacates building

== See also ==
- List of United States post offices
