= Waiākea Mission Station-Hilo Station =

Church, Historic Place in Hawaii County, Hawaii

Haili Church
- Haili Congregational Church
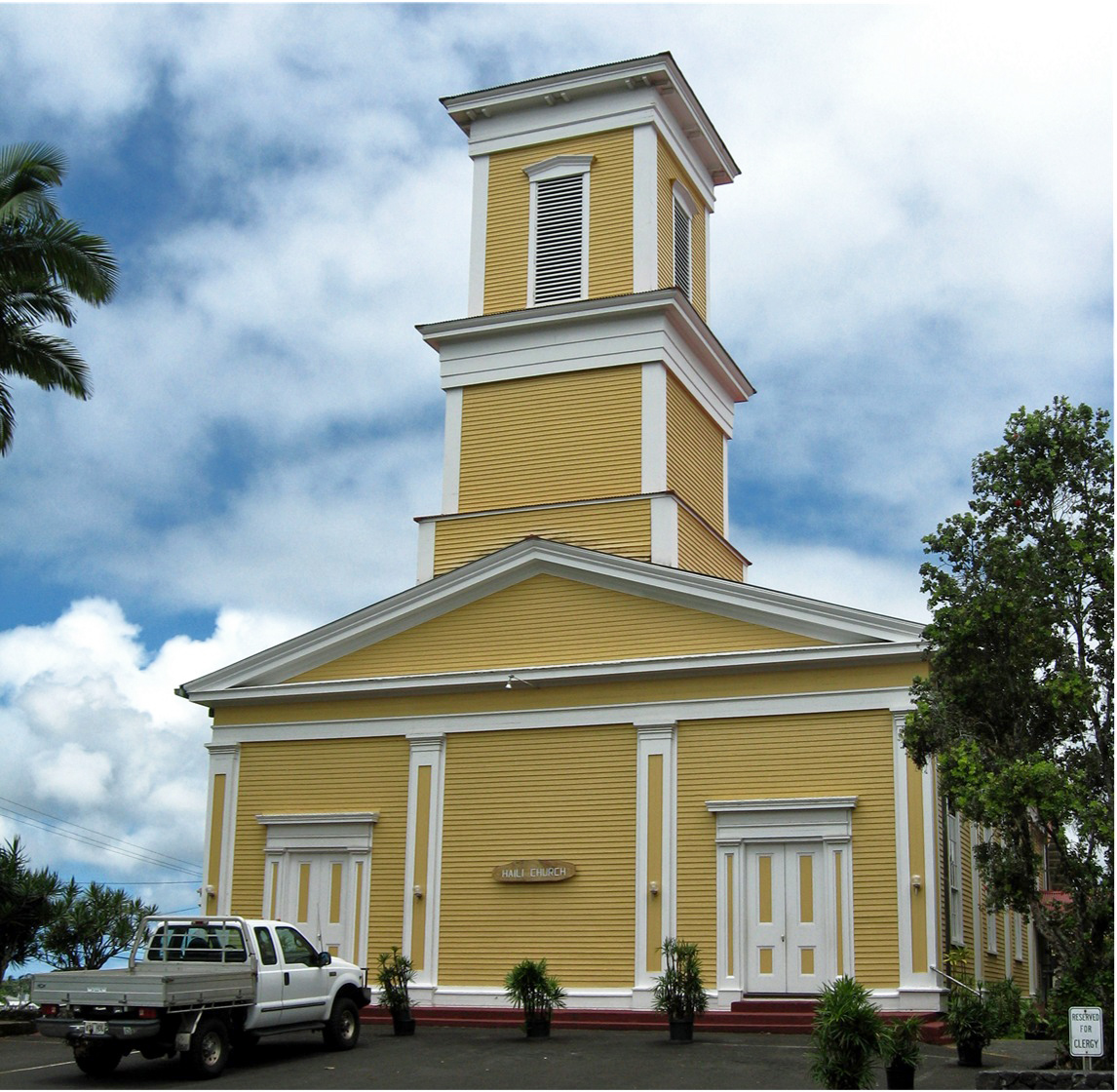
- Ua Laʻa No Iehova (Dedicated To God)
- Haili Church
- Location: 211 Haili Street; Hilo, Hawaiʻi
- Country: United States
- Denomination: United Church of Christ
- Website: www.hailichurch.org

History
- Status: Church
- Founded: 1824

Architecture
- Functional status: Active
- Style: Greek Revival
- Years built: 1854-1859 (current building)

Administration
- Division: Hawaii Conference

Clergy
- Pastor: Kahu Pono Daniel Kawaha
- Waiakea Mission Station-Hilo Station
- U.S. National Register of Historic Places
- Location within Hawaii
- Coordinates: 19°43′20″N 155°5′20″W
- Built: 1824
- NRHP reference No.: 02000387
- Added to NRHP: April 23, 2002

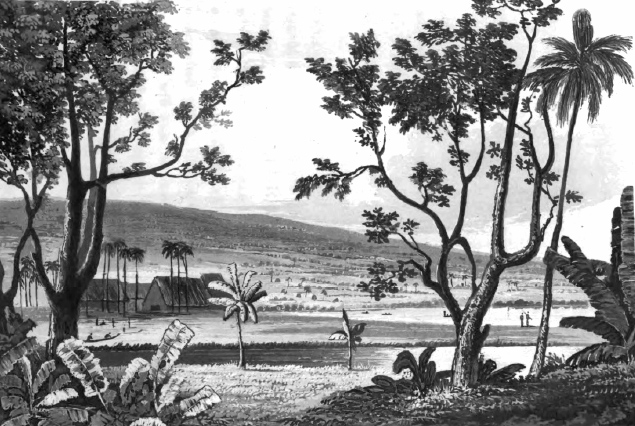
The thatched huts in 1825

The Waiākea Mission Station was the first Christian mission on the eastern side of the Island of Hawaiʻi. Also known as the Hilo Station, the latest structure is now called Haili Church.

== The first mission ==
The American missionaries Asa Thurston, Artemis Bishop, Joseph Goodrich and English missionary William Ellis toured the island in 1823 and planned to establish a network of several posts. The first two were Mokuaikaua Church in the Kona District (western coast), and this one on the east side. On May 19, 1824, a simple grass hut was dedicated as the first church of the American Board of Commissioners for Foreign Missions with Joseph Goodrich as preacher and Samuel Ruggles as teacher. The Hawaiian village at the time was called Waiākea, in the district called Hilo. The name of the village came from wai ākea in the Hawaiian language meaning "broad waters", and was located in what is now the southeast part of the city of Hilo.

In December 1824, Goodrich met Chiefess Kapiʻolani at the Kīlauea volcano, for a dramatic demonstration that the new faith was acceptable. In June 1825 HMS Blonde arrived, and Goodrich guided a party to the summit of Mauna Kea.

In 1825, a larger grass structure was built on present-day Kalakaua Park. Goodrich brought some coffee trees here some time after 1825, and Samuel Ruggles brought some to the other side of the island (the first Kona coffee) in 1828 when he was transferred to the Kealakekua Church. David Belden Lyman and his wife, Sarah Joiner Lyman arrived in 1832 to established and teach at a new boarding school. Over the next few years, the boarding school, a larger thatched church, and other buildings were built in that area, which now is the town square surrounded by civic buildings such as the historic District Courthouse and Police Station and Hilo Federal Building. In 1835, Rev. Titus Coan and his wife Fidelia arrived. He learned the Hawaiian language, so he could travel through the districts of Puna and Kaʻū to the south, gathering converts. His writings describe avoiding the perils of the dense tropical rainforests, and observations of the Kīlauea volcano.

== Later buildings ==
By 1840, the congregation had grown, and a wood-frame building was built on a stone foundation. The wood had to be dragged by hand down from the slopes of Mauna Loa since no horses or oxen were available, and no roads suitable for wheeled carts. Labor was provided by hundreds of Hawaiians, with the blessing of Royal Governor John Adams Kuakini. All these previous buildings had suffered damage from the heavy tropical rains in this area, so a more substantial building was planned.

The present structure was started in 1854 near the Lyman house and dedicated on April 8, 1859 by Rev. Coan. The name of this church comes from the forest where the ʻōhiʻa (Metrosideros polymorpha) wood was gathered for its construction. The main interior space has a ceiling 20 feet (6 m) high spanning 50 feet (15 m). The architectural style is simplified Greek Revival, as was popular in New England meetinghouses at the time of its design. Coan served as pastor, but was often proselytizing on circuits through the countryside or showing visitors to the volcano, when Lyman performed services. The flexible wooden building survived an 1868 earthquake that damaged many stone buildings and plaster walls. Pews made from koa (Acacia koa) wood were installed in 1900.

In 1902, Harry K. Naope Sr. founded the Haili Church Choir, which sang a cappella in the Hawaiian language. In 1908, two stained glass windows from Tiffany Galleries in New York City were installed. A pipe organ was installed in 1929, and the tower and roof were rebuilt. Repairs were made after a July 1979 fire destroyed a portion of the tower and interior. The original 1859 bell was cracked in the fire, and is now on display in the church.

Several eruptions of Mauna Loa (the most recent in 1984) have threatened the city of Hilo, but stopped short. Tsunamis devastated the areas along the coast, with the largest in 1946 and 1960, but the new site of the church was far enough inland to avoid destruction.

== Today ==
Haili Church is still in operation and offers both in-person and virtual services. The congregation also operates another chapel in Hilo, named Kuhio Chapel and a primary school known as Haili Christian School. Some families have had members in the choir for four or five generations. The choir was honored in 2001 by the Hawaiian Music Hall of Fame. The church is located at 211 Haili Street and its current Kahu Pono is Daniel Kawaha. The Current Church Leadership (Council) Members are (Moderator) Lyndell Lindsey (Vice-Moderator) Enola-Gay Osorio (Secretary) LeeAnn Lindsey (Treasurer) Cindy Lee (Diaconate) Carol Hughes-Okada (Missions) Lorna Bufil (Evangelism) Daniel Kawaha (Delegate) Cynthia Akimseu

It was added to the National Register of Historic Places on April 23, 2002, as site 02000387, and the state list as site 10-35-7417 on November 17, 2001. Across the street (named for the church), the home of some of the early missionaries is now the Lyman House Memorial Museum.
