= Hilo Bay =

Bay in Hawaii County, Hawaii

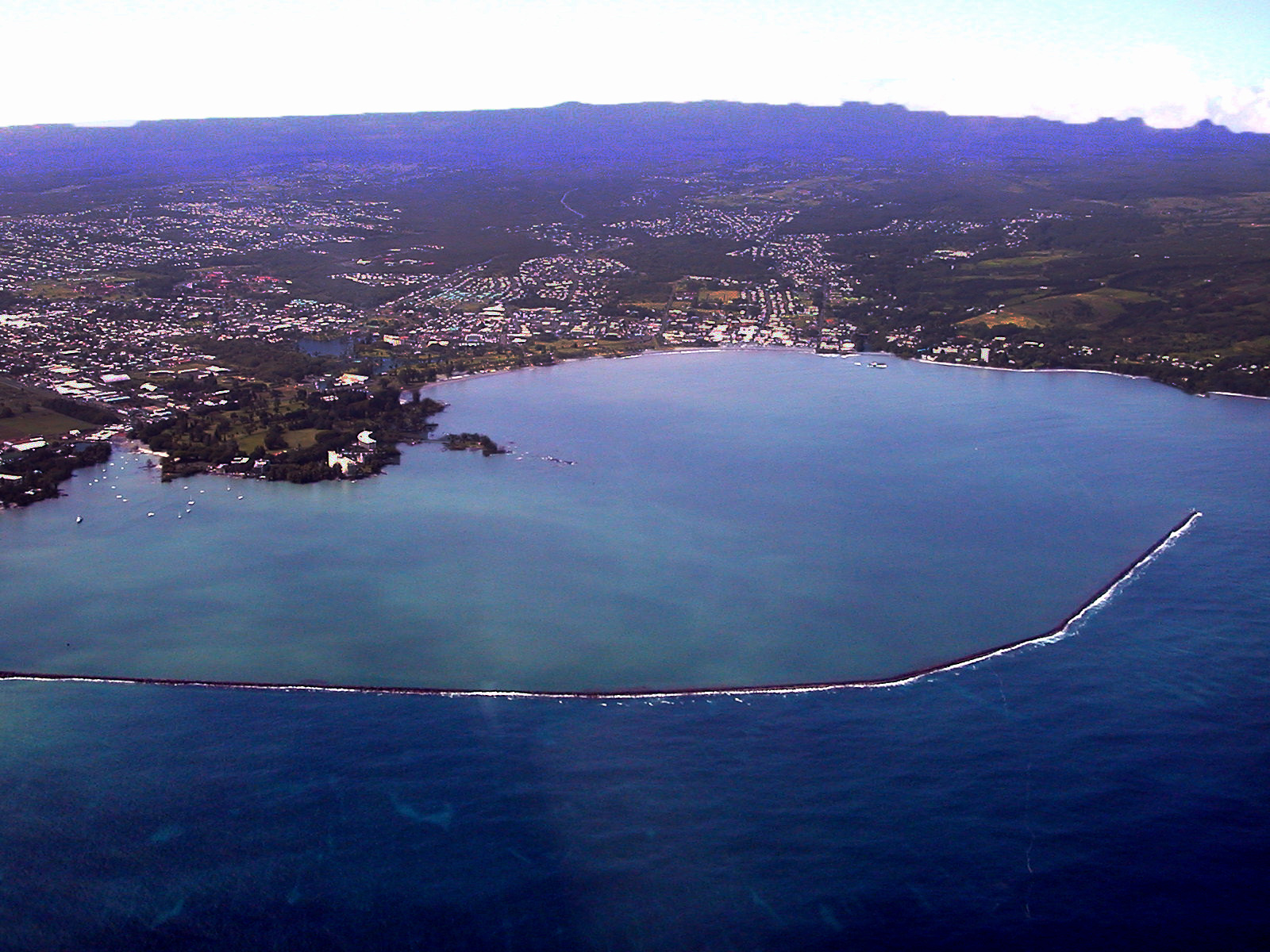
Hilo Bay and the town of Hilo, Hawaii with breakwater completed in 1929

Hilo Bay is a large bay located on the eastern coast of the island of Hawaiʻi.

== Description ==
The modern town of Hilo, Hawaii overlooks Hilo Bay, located at 19°44′10″N 155°4′37″W. North of the bay runs the Hamakua Coast on the slopes of Mauna Kea, and south of the bay is the Puna district on the slopes of Mauna Loa. The area just inland from the bay is the Hilo district, divided into north and south Hilo within the County of Hawaii. Banyan Drive runs through Liliʻuokalani Gardens near downtown Hilo at the edge of the bay.

== History ==
The ancient Hawaiian name for the village on the bay was Waiākea. After being surveyed in 1825 by Charles Robert Malden of HMS Blonde, it was called Byron's Bay for captain George Byron, 7th Baron Byron. The coral reef on the eastern side of the bay is called Blonde Reef for the ship. The first breakwater across the bay was first started in 1908 under contract to Engineer Delbert Metzger. It was extended in 1911, and completed in 1929. The small island Moku Ola (now called Coconut Island) was the site of an ancient temple dedicated to healing.

=== Tsunamis ===
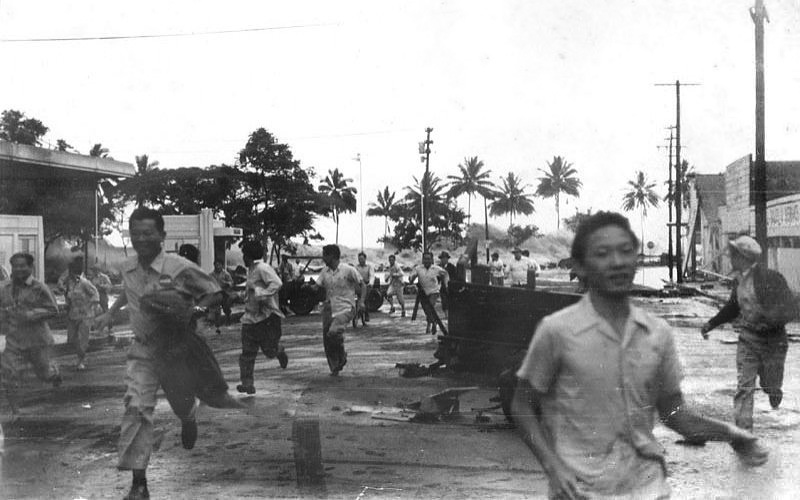
1946 Tsunami heads inland from Hilo Bay

Hilo Bay is sometimes called "the tsunami capital of the United States". The bay's topography steers tsunamis to Hilo from earthquakes in active areas such as Chile and the Aleutian Islands. The April 1, 1946, tsunami from the 1946 Aleutian Islands earthquake killed by between 165 and 173 people in Hilo Bay. On May 23, 1960, a tsunami originating from the 1960 Valdivia earthquake in Chile (the most powerful earthquake ever recorded) killed 61 people in Hilo. After the February 27, 2010 Chile earthquake, the effectiveness of the Pacific Tsunami Warning Center (PTWC) was shown, as no one was injured on Hilo Bay after the (PTWC) sirens sounded and evacuations were ordered.
