= East Hawaiʻi Cultural Center =

- District Courthouse and Police Station
- U.S. National Register of Historic Places
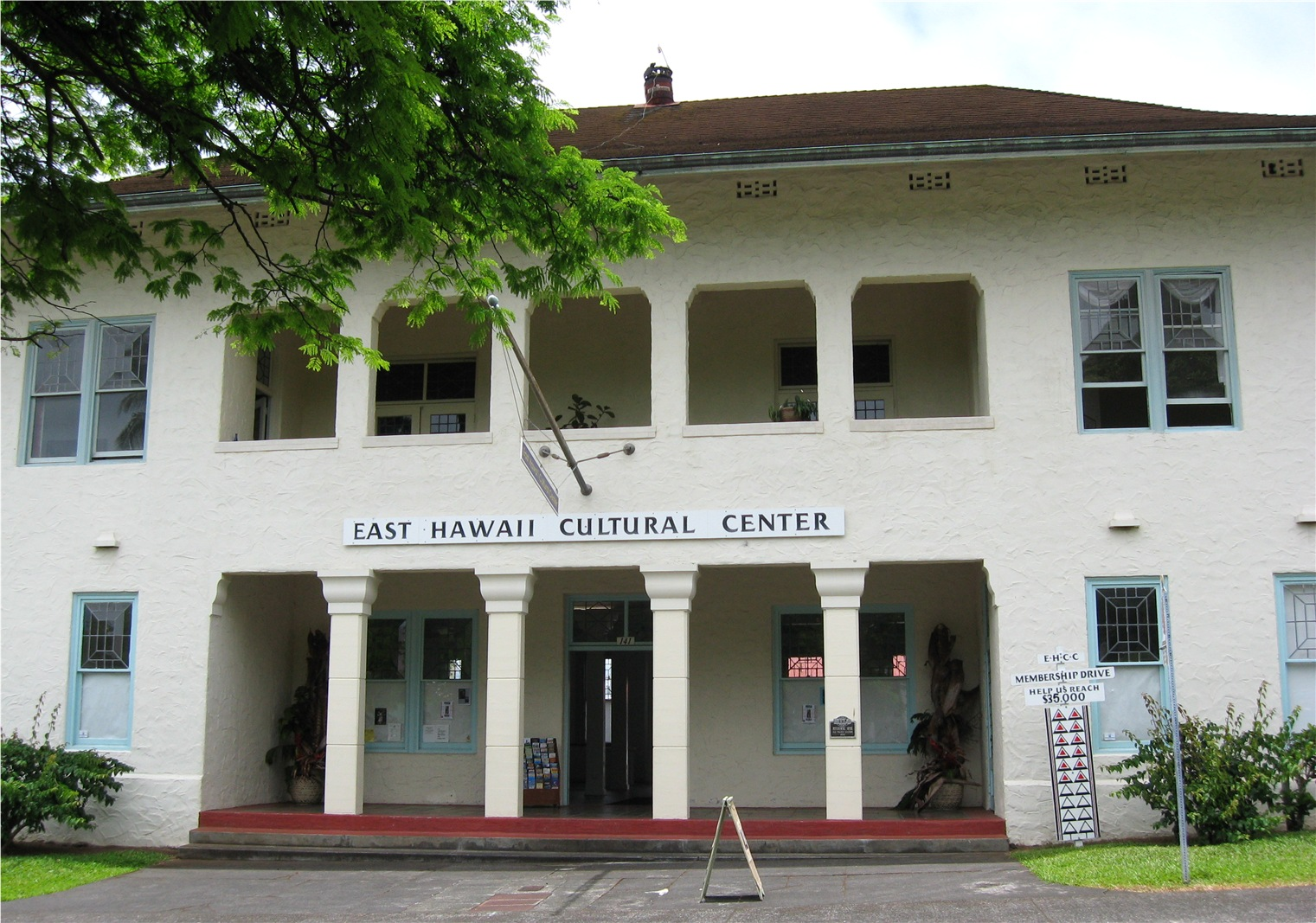

- Location within Hawaii
- Location: Hilo, Hawaii
- Coordinates: 19°43′29″N 155°5′18″W
- Area: 0.57 acres or 0.23 hectares
- Built: 1932
- NRHP reference No.: 79000752
- Added to NRHP: September 4, 1979

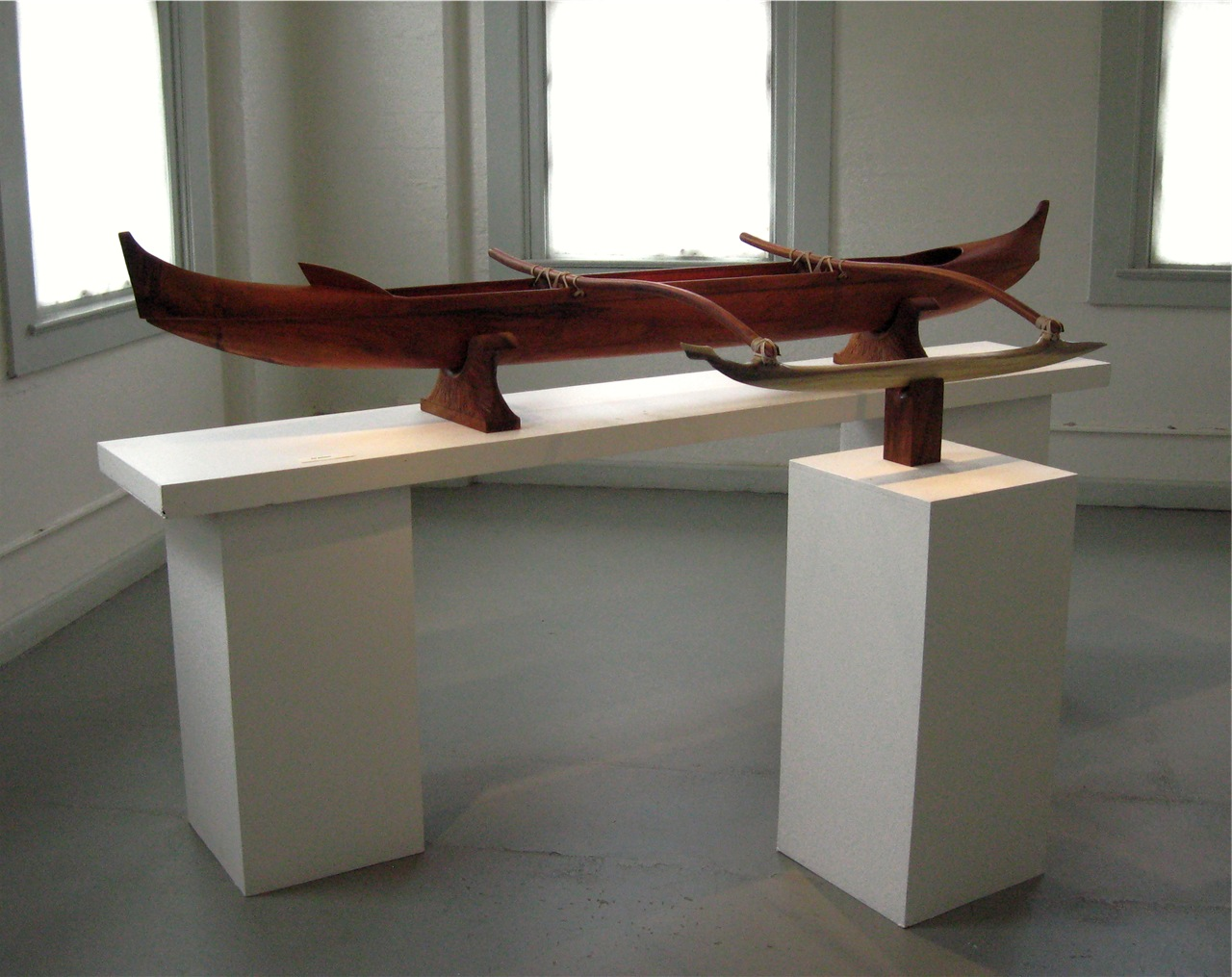
A koa wood canoe model on display inside

The East Hawaiʻi Cultural Center (EHCC) is an art gallery, community theater, and cultural center in downtown Hilo, Hawaii. EHCC features regular art exhibitions with free or suggested donation entry to the general public. Founded by an umbrella group of local arts organizations, the Center is housed in a historic former police station facing Kalakaua Park.

== Building history ==
The building was listed as site 79000752 on the National Register of Historic Places on September 4, 1979.

The two-story structure is built from reinforced concrete with wooden interiors. It is located at 141 Kalakaua Street, coordinates 19°43′29″N 155°05′18″W. The area had been used for civic buildings since about 1817, with the park across the street created by King David Kalākaua in 1877. In February 1969 the court was moved to a new state office building, and in 1975 the police department moved to a larger building, leaving it vacant.

== Cultural Council ==
The East Hawaiʻi Cultural Council was founded in 1967, and leased the building which was planned for demolition.
