= Hilo District, Hawaii =

Hilo is a moku or district on the Big Island of Hawaiʻi in the State of Hawaii, U.S.A. In the current system of administration of Hawaiʻi County, the moku of Hilo is divided into North Hilo District (Hilo ‘Akau) and South Hilo District (Hilo Hema).

Hilo is located on the eastern, windward side of the island, enjoying abundance of rainfall, and therefore includes the island's most populated town, also called Hilo.

(3) North Hilo and (2) South Hilo Districts are located in the east coast of Hawaii County (the Big Island). They are bordered by Hamakua District (4) in the north, and by Kau District (9) in the south and Puna District (1) in the southeast. The far inland areas are largely unpopulated, being forest reserves on the slopes of Mauna Kea and Mauna Loa.

== North Hilo District ==
In the District of North Hilo, there are, along Hawaii State Highway 19 from north to south, the following unincorporated towns and localities:

- ʻŌʻōkala
- Laupāhoehoe and the Train Museum
- Ninole

and others. Inland, along State Highway 200, are:

- Mauna Kea mountain road and Puu Huluhulu

and others.

== South Hilo District ==
In the District of South Hilo, there are, along State Highway 19, the following unincorporated towns and localities:

- Honomu and the Akaka Falls
- Pepeekeo
- Wainaku
- Hilo Bay, the Wailuku River and the Rainbow Falls
- Hilo downtown: Pacific Tsunami Museum, Hawaii Community Correctional Center, etc.

Along State Highway 11, are:

- Hilo International Airport
- King Kuhio Shopping Center
- Pana'ewa Rainforest Zoo

and others. Along State Highway 200 and its extension, are:

- Kaumana
- University of Hawaii at Hilo
- Puainako Shopping Center

and others.

== Gallery ==
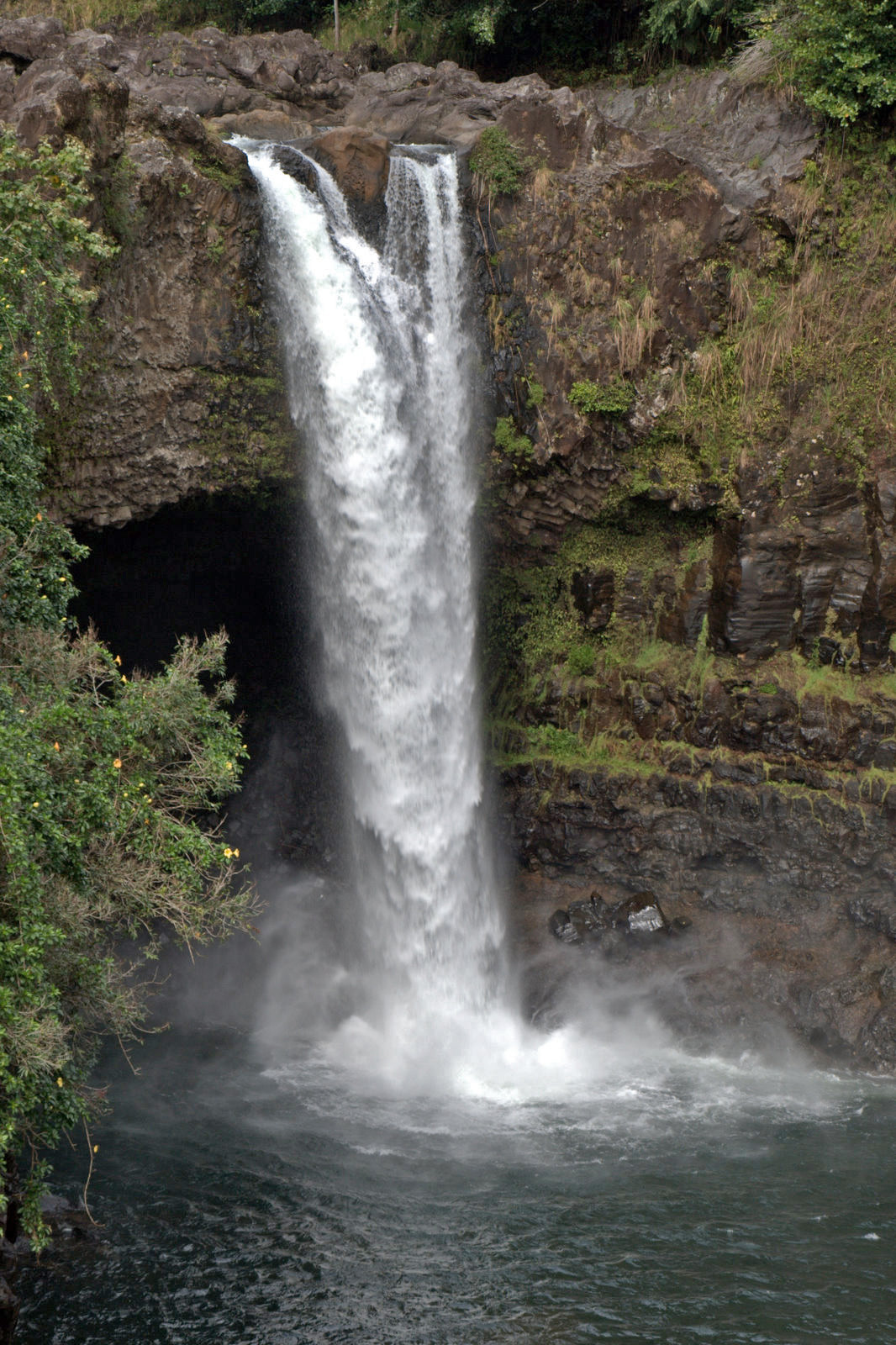
Rainbow Falls, Hawaii

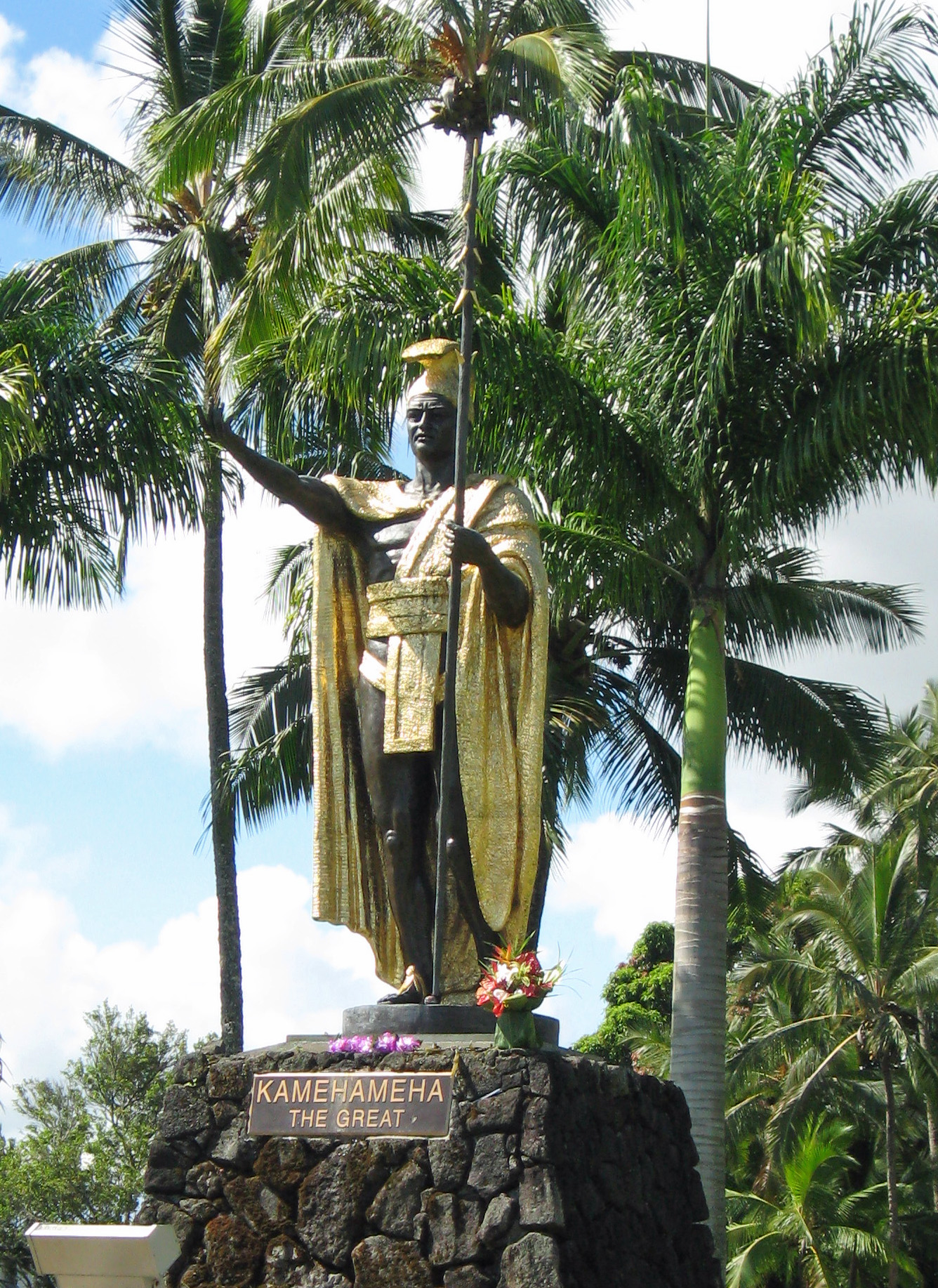
Kamehameha Statue in Hilo

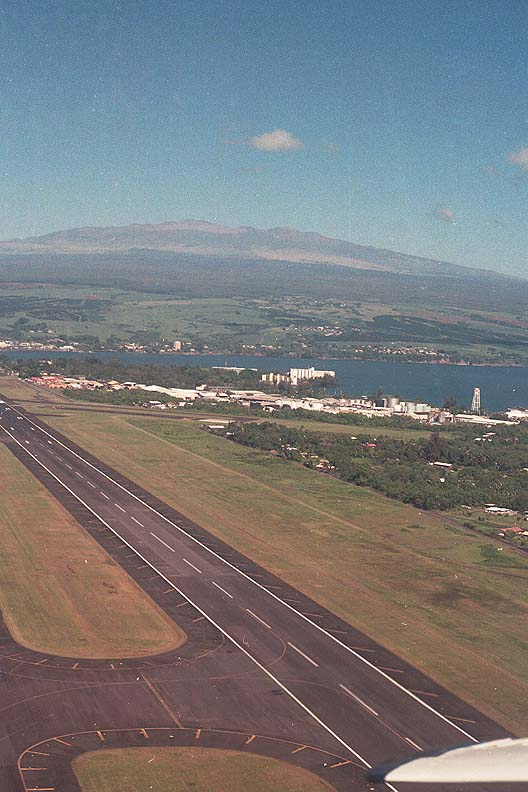
Hilo International Airport, with Mauna Kea in the back

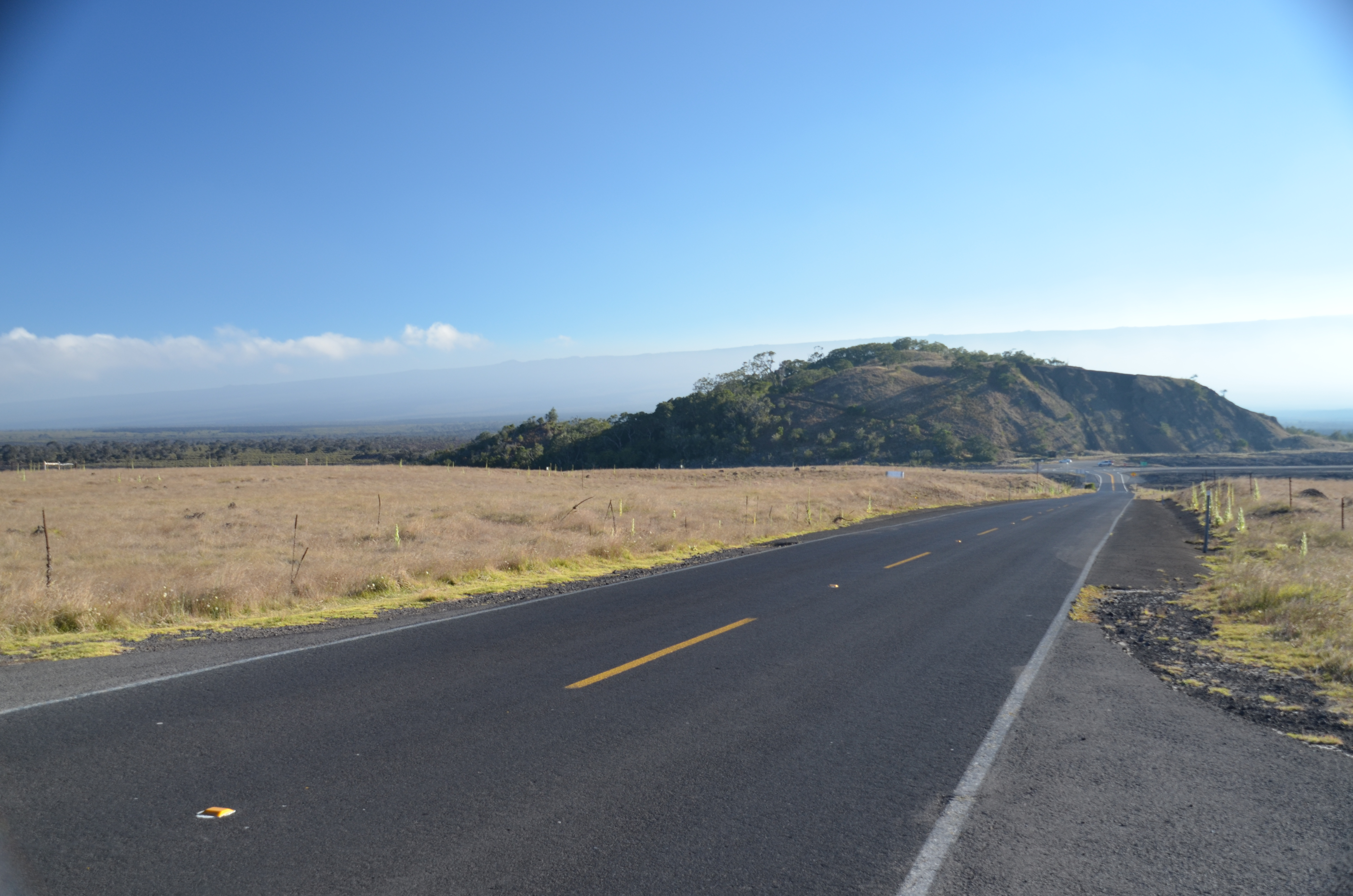
Puu Huluhulu as seen from the Mauna Kea road
