= Lower Waiakea Mountain Bicycle Park =

Bicycle park in Hawaii

19.634622°N 155.0885967°W Lower Waiakea Mountain Bicycle Park is the state of Hawai‘i's first bicycle park created by Big Island Mountain Biking Association.

The park is located off of Stainback highway, approximately 1.5 miles west of Pana'ewa Zoo off Quarry Road. A free permit is required and can be obtained at the Division of Forestry and Wildlife in Hilo or in Waimea. The trail network was created to provide bicyclists a challenging and technical single track trail. The trails are part of a multi-use area with hunters and hikers.

Lower Waiakea Mountain Bicycle Park is also known as Kulani Trails. The trails are relatively flat with tight turns. It is recommended for advanced cyclists because of its technical difficulty.
