= Paukaʻa, Hawaii =

Census-designated place in Hawaii, U.S.

Paukaʻa
- Census-designated place
- Location in Hawaii County and the state of Hawaii
- Coordinates: 19°45′59″N 155°5′55″W
- Country: United States
- State: Hawaii
- County: Hawaii

Area
  - Total: 0.43 sq mi (1.11 km^{2})
  - Land: 0.33 sq mi (0.85 km^{2})
  - Water: 0.10 sq mi (0.26 km^{2})
- Elevation: 243 ft (74 m)

Population (2020)
  - Total: 434
  - Density: 1,319.2/sq mi (509.34/km^{2})
- Time zone: UTC-10 (Hawaii-Aleutian)
- Area code: 808
- FIPS code: 15-61700
- GNIS feature ID: 0363187

Paukaʻa is a census-designated place (CDP) in Hawaii County, Hawaii, United States. The population was 434 at the 2020 census, down from 467 at the 2000 census. The ZIP code is 96720.

== Geography ==
Paukaʻa is located on the eastern side of the island of Hawaii at 19°45′59″N 155°5′55″W (19.766336, -155.098686). It is north of Wainaku and south of Papaikou. Hilo is 3 miles (5 km) to the south. It is bordered to the east by the Pacific Ocean, just north of Hilo Bay.

According to the United States Census Bureau, the Paukaʻa CDP has a total area of 0.54 square miles (1.4 km^{2}), of which 0.42 square miles (1.1 km^{2}) are land and 0.1 square miles (0.3 km^{2}), or 19.01%, are water.

== Demographics ==
Historical population
Census	Pop.	Note	%±
2020	434		—
U.S. Decennial Census

As of the census of 2000, there were 495 people, 196 households, and 137 families residing in the CDP. The population density was 1,174.4 inhabitants per square mile (453.4/km^{2}). There were 215 housing units at an average density of 510.1 per square mile (197.0/km^{2}). The racial makeup of the CDP was 33.74% White, 0.40% African American, 41.41% Asian, 5.25% Pacific Islander, 0.40% from other races, and 18.79% from two or more races. Hispanic or Latino of any race were 4.44% of the population.

There were 196 households, out of which 23.0% had children under the age of 18 living with them, 55.6% were married couples living together, 11.7% had a female householder with no husband present, and 30.1% were non-families. 26.5% of all households were made up of individuals, and 20.9% had someone living alone who was 65 years of age or older. The average household size was 2.53 and the average family size was 2.94.

In the CDP the population was spread out, with 17.6% under the age of 18, 5.7% from 18 to 24, 19.6% from 25 to 44, 30.1% from 45 to 64, and 27.1% who were 65 years of age or older. The median age was 50 years. For every 100 females, there were 88.9 males. For every 100 females age 18 and over, there were 86.3 males.

The median income for a household in the CDP was $40,804, and the median income for a family was $45,833. Males had a median income of $35,938 versus $20,500 for females. The per capita income for the CDP was $22,246. About 5.2% of families and 8.9% of the population were below the poverty line, including 24.1% of those under age 18 and 3.1% of those age 65 or over.
