= Hilo Tropical Gardens =

Former botanical garden in Hilo, Hawaii

Coordinates: 19.7350°N 155.0373°W

Hilo Tropical Gardens (2 acres), located at 1477 Kalanianaole Avenue, Hilo, Hawaii, Hawaii was a privately run botanical garden with a guest house for budget travelers.

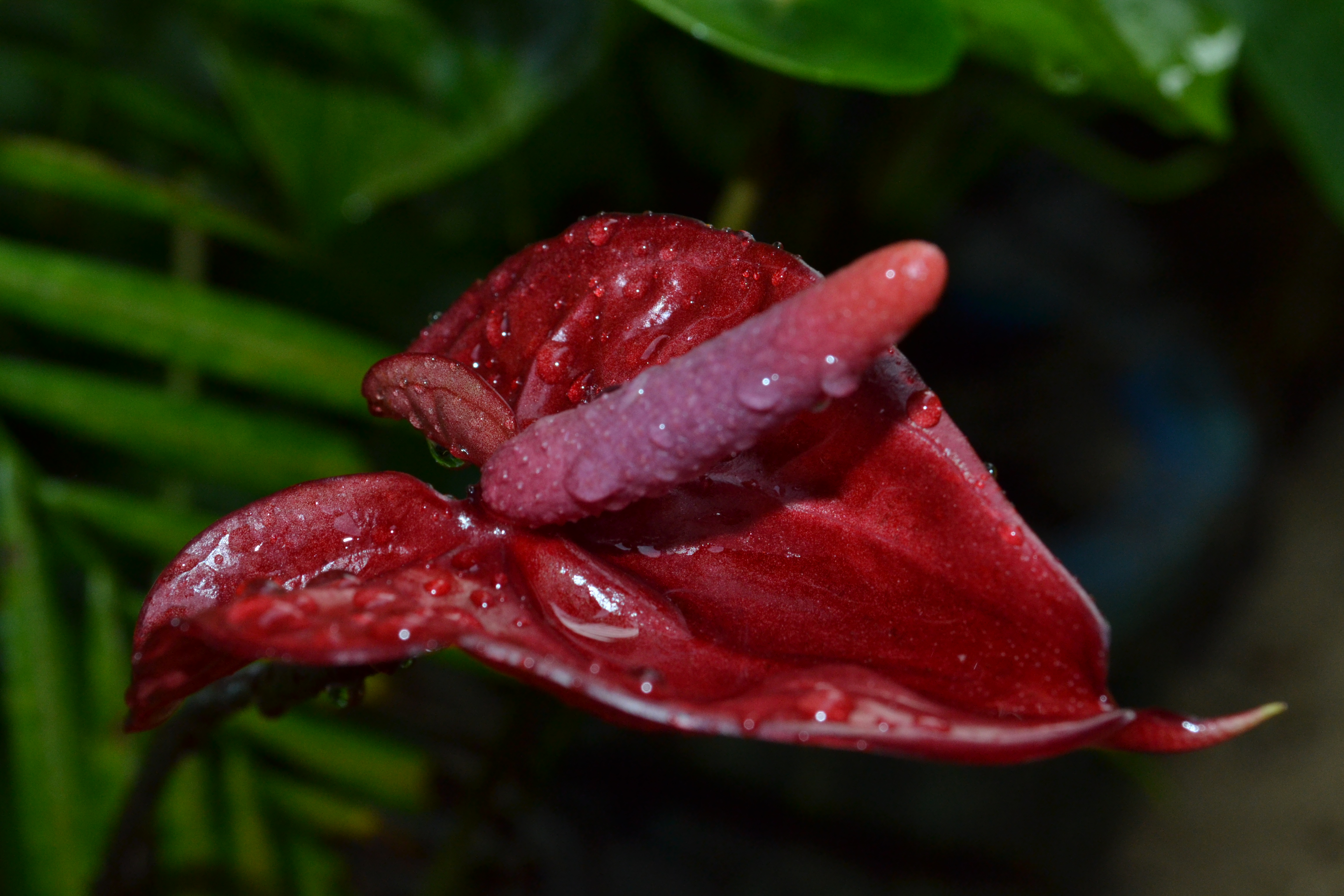
Hilo Tropical Gardens

It was founded in 1948 as Kong's Floraleigh Gardens by En Loy Kong, a businessman. The garden's founding name was inspired by Flora and Leigh, Kong's wife and daughter, respectively.

== See also ==
- List of botanical gardens in the United States
