= James Kealoha Beach =

Beach in Hawaii, United States

Coordinates: 19.735136°N 155.033872°W

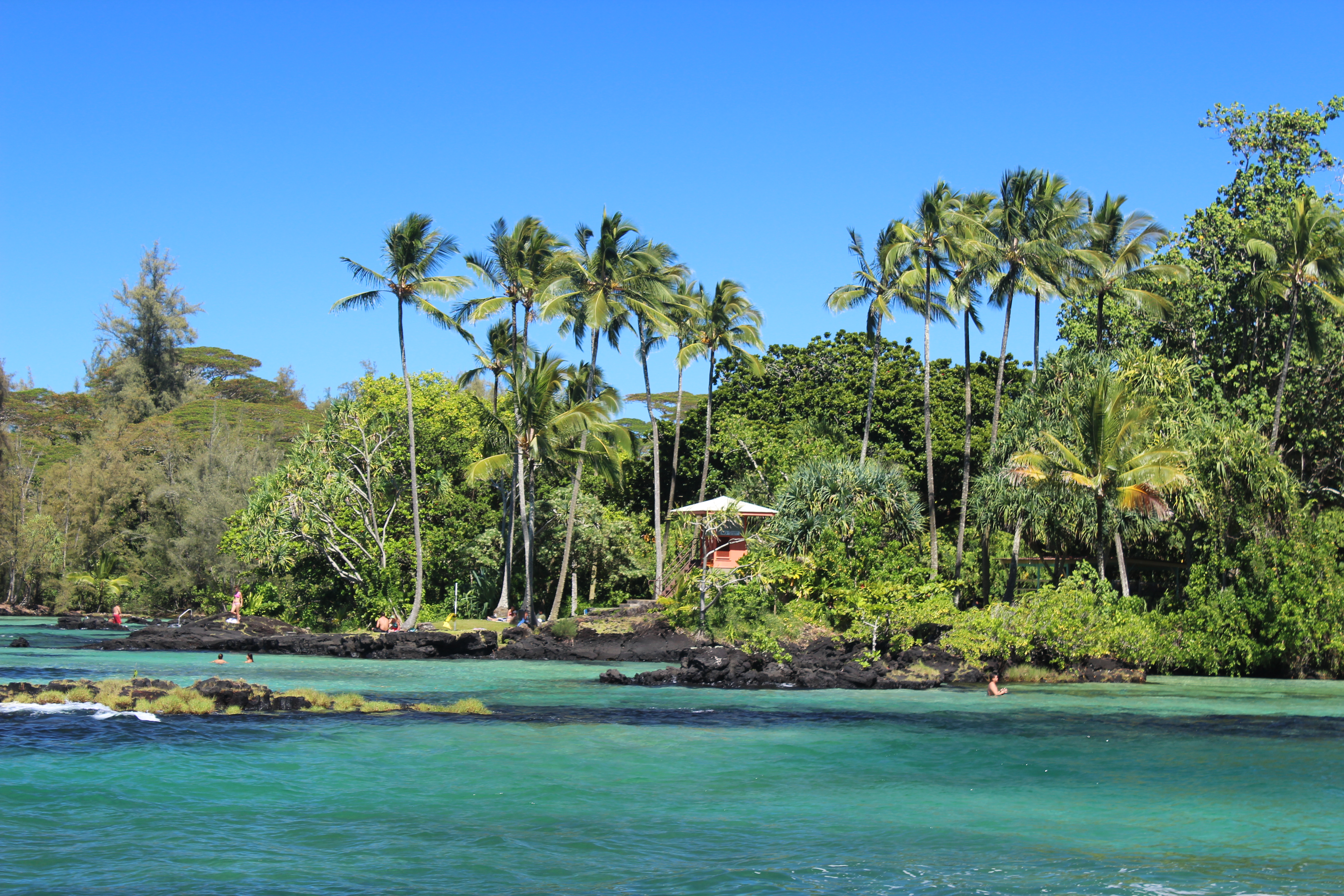
Main swimming area of 4-Mile Beach

James Kealoha (4-mile) Beach Park is a swimming and snorkeling beach located in the Hilo district on the Island of Hawai'i. It is known locally as '4-mile' beach, as its location is exactly 4 miles from the Hilo town post-office. Showers and restrooms are located there, as well as a lifeguard tower for safety.

The beach is named after James Kealoha who was the first Lieutenant Governor of Hawaii in the administration of Governor of Hawaiʻi William F. Quinn. Prior to his election as Lieutenant Governor, Kealoha served a number of years as a legislator on Hawaii island, distinguishing himself as a respected leader. The beach is located at the intersection of Kalaniana'ole Avenue and Keaukaha Road. Parking is available in the public lot, as well as off of Kalaniana'ole Avenue.

== Description ==
The beach is known locally for its warm and calm waters with the wave action somewhat calmed by the reefs and rock walls just offshore. Close to shore, cold springs bubble up from underwater. The warm water can be accessed by swimming through the close shore cooler water. The area right in front of the lifeguard tower tends to be some of the warmest due to the soft, sandy bottom which helps to heat the water column.

The eastern part of the beach has public stairway access to the water, however, the swimming area can be accessed anywhere along the shore. Snorkeling is best done in any of the rocky/reefy areas. Signs are located at the parking lot entrance that note local kinds of fish, turtle (honu), urchin and marine invertebrates that may be seen. On weekends, local shave ice and crack seed trucks service the beach park, as well as pupu trucks that serve Hawaiian plate lunch.

== Activities ==
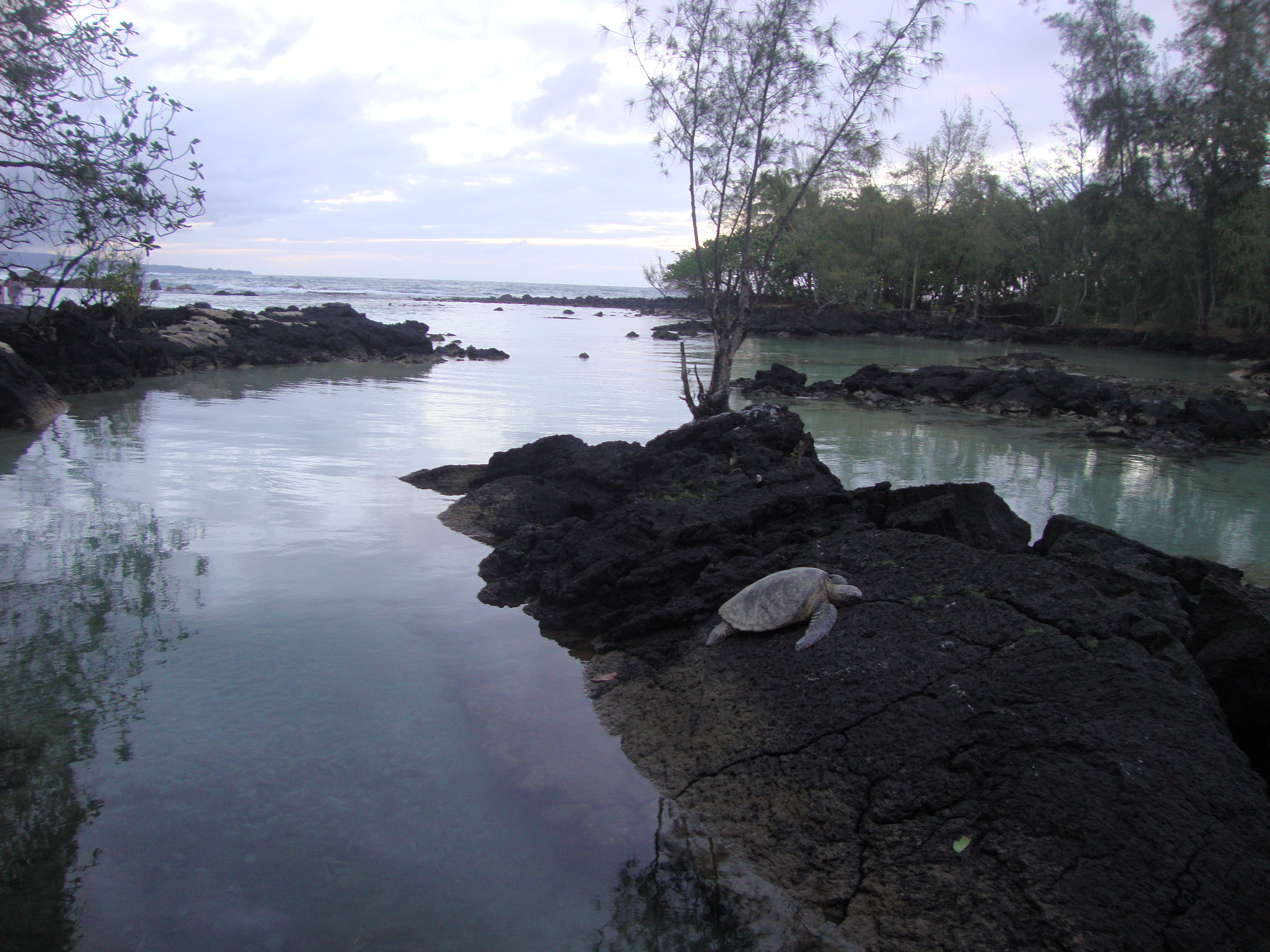
Honu (turtle) resting at Carlsmith Beach Park

Popular water activities at Kealoha include swimming, snorkeling, surfing, pole fishing and spearfishing. The central and western areas of the bay open up to the deeper offshore waters, so during times of high surf, a strong rip current runs makai (seaward) in this area, and many locals surf the waves born on this current.

Located offshore is Scout Island, known locally as Mahikea Island. The original name of Mahikea Island is Peiwe (a corruption of the 'Olelo Hawai'i spelling of 'Pe'ewe'). This name refers to the drupe shells, whose snails were commonly eaten and found throughout the Hawaiian Islands in shallow, rocky areas. The island was hit by the tsunami in 1946, which shortened it on its makai (seaward) end. It used to be a popular summer camping site among the residents of Keaukaha, as well as a destination for the Big Island boy scouts (hence its English name “Scout Island”).

The eastern end of the bay is more sheltered, and families with children prefer this area. There is a large swimming area that contains a few inlets and pockets of white sand. Behind the beach are trees that provide shade for picnickers. A picnic pavilion is also available. This area was once managed by the Carlsmith family, so sometimes the park is referred to as Carlsmith Park, though technically, the two beach parks are separate.

== History ==
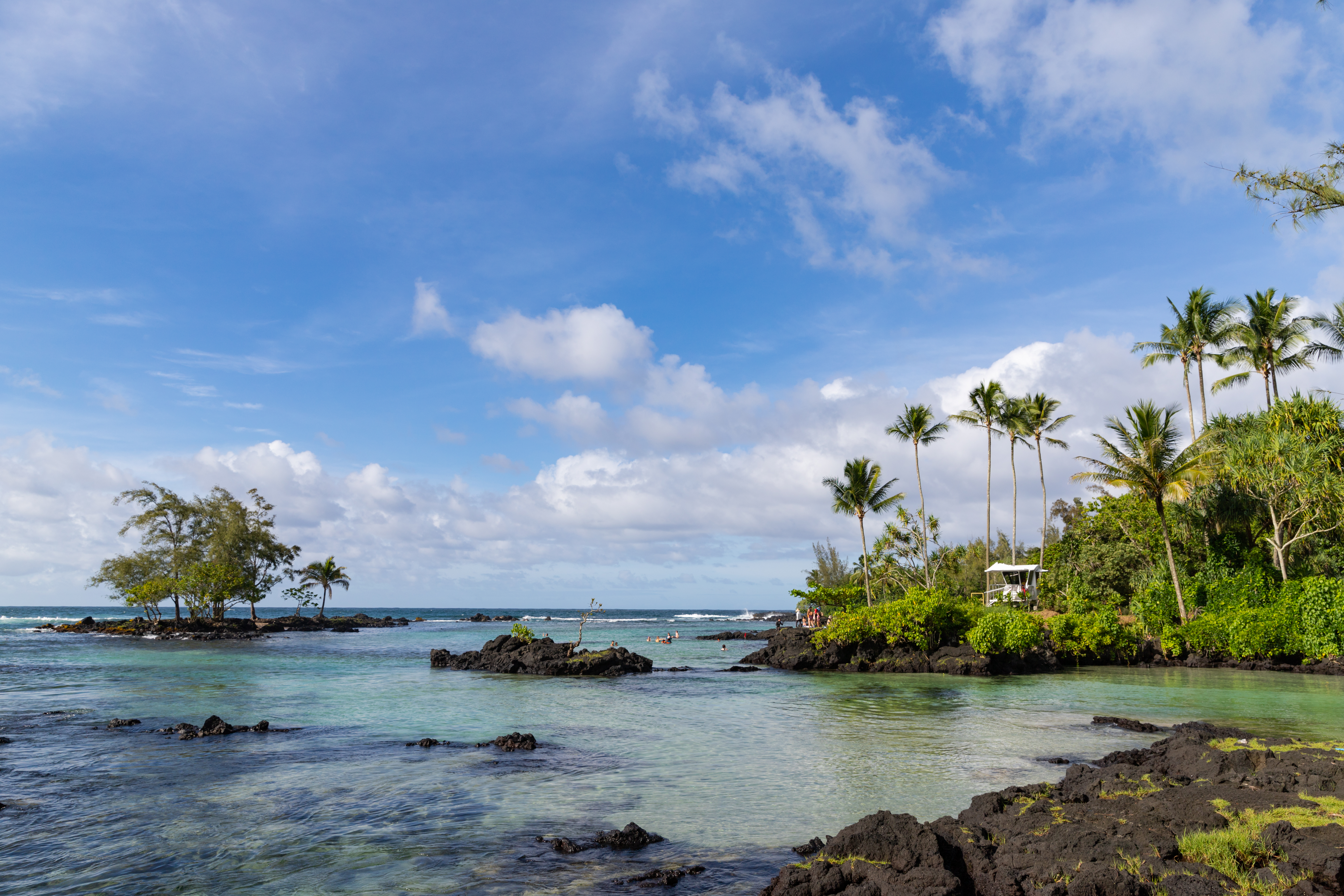
4-Mile Beach in the Carlsmith Beach Park

The shoreline lands of the Waiakea peninsula and Keaukaha contain fourteen fishponds, the largest of which is Lokowaka (at 60 acres in area), located directly across Kalaniana'ole Ave from the beach park. Lokowaka is owned by the state of Hawai'i, but is under lease to private interests. Renowned island-wide for its excellent mullet and tilapia, Lokowaka ('Waka's pond') was named for Waka, a kupua (demigod) who could assume the form of either a giant lizard or a woman, who dove into the pond to escape the jealous wrath of Pele.

The beach park was sung about by Edith Kanaka'ole in her 1979 song Na Pana Kaulana o Keaukaha. Below are the lyrics in both 'Olelo Hawai'i as well as English:

Au aʻe ʻoe e pa mokumoku
ʻO Peiwe pili me Lokowaka
Kapaʻia o Kealoha Paka, Mile Eha

You walk along the seashore and see the islets.
This is Peiwe, close to Lokowaka
Called today 'Kealoha Park' and '4-Miles'
