= Lyman House Memorial Museum =

Historic Place in Hawaii County, Hawaii, United States

- Rev. D. B. Lyman House
- U.S. National Register of Historic Places
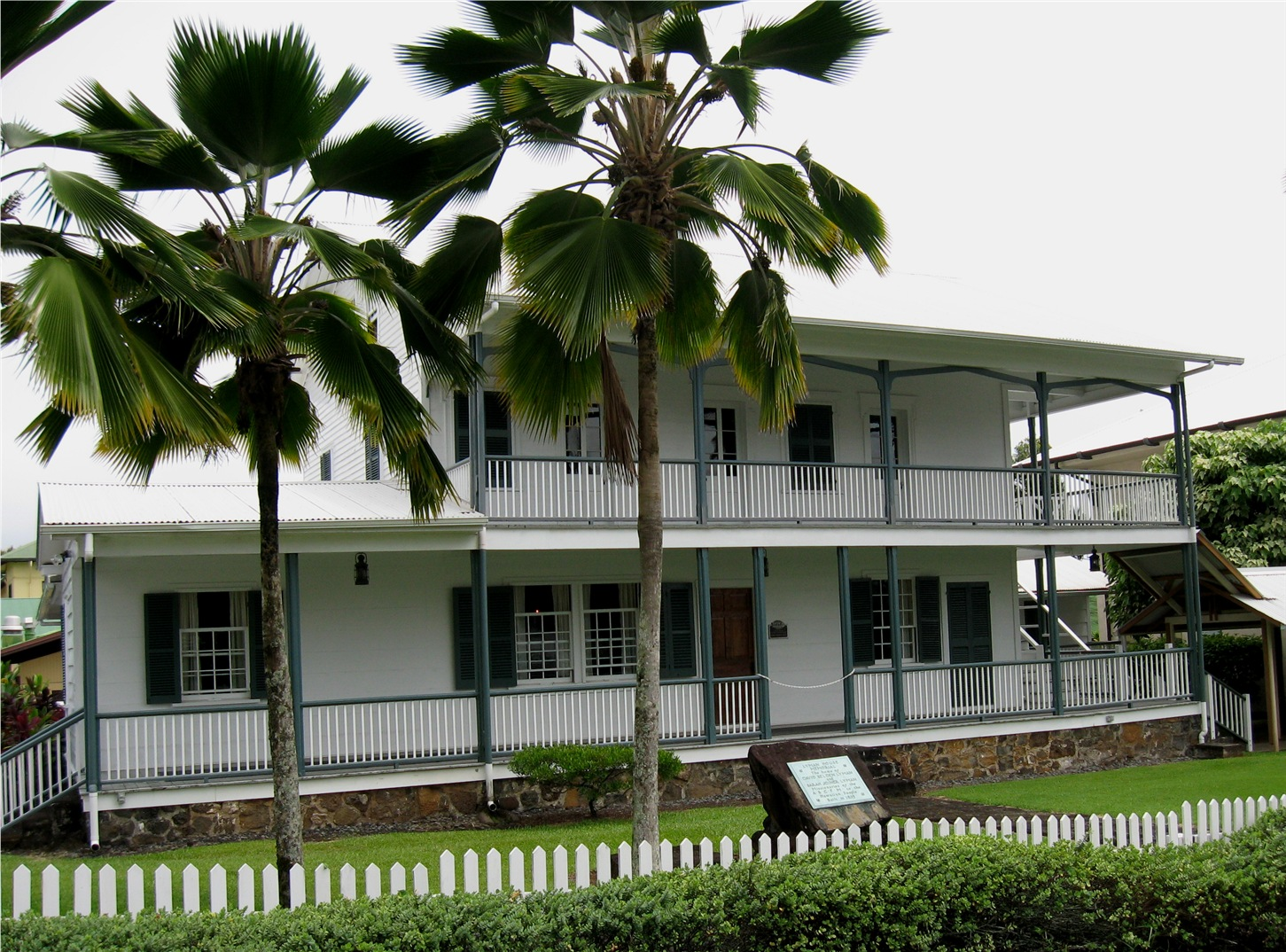
- The historic Lyman House

- Location within Hawaii
- Location: 276 Haili St., Hilo, Hawaii
- Coordinates: 19°43′18″N 155°5′28″W
- Area: 0.7 acres (0.28 ha)
- Built: 1838
- Architectural style: "Cape Cod"
- Website: lymanmuseum.org
- NRHP reference No.: 78001012
- Added to NRHP: March 24, 1978

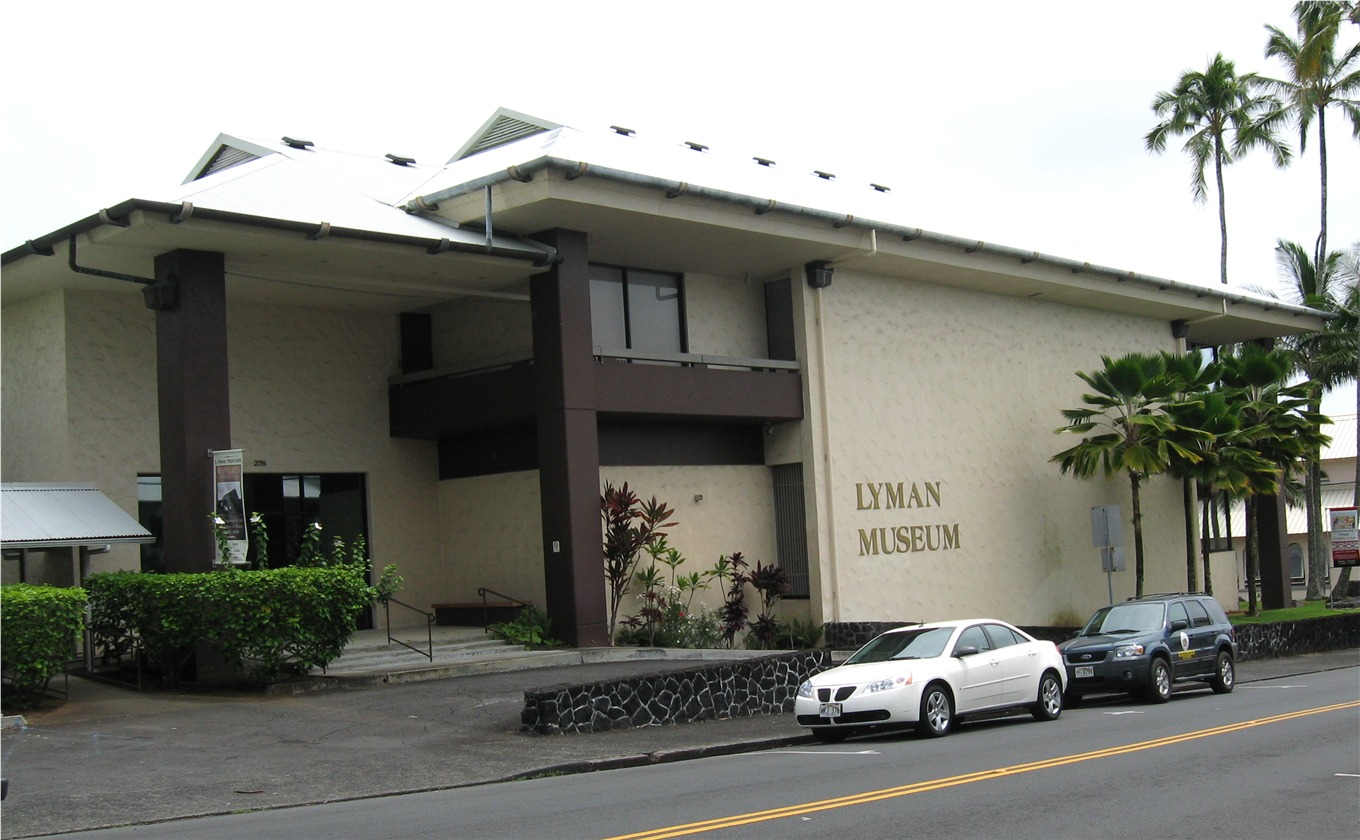
The modern addition for the museum

The Lyman House Memorial Museum, also known as the Lyman Museum and Lyman House, is a Hilo, Hawaii-based natural history museum founded in 1931 in the Lyman family mission house, originally built in 1838. The main collections were moved to an adjacent modern building in the 1960s, while the house is open for tours as the island's oldest surviving wood-framed building.

== The mission ==
Reverend David Belden Lyman and his wife, Sarah Joiner Lyman, arrived in 1832, missionaries from the American Board of Commissioners for Foreign Missions. It was one of the first houses on the island to be built in the style of their native New England, using native koa and ohia woods. Guests included Mark Twain and Isabella Bird. In 1854 - 1859 the new Haili Church was built across the street, replacing the thatched structures that served previously for the congregation.

The mission house was added to the National Register of Historic Places on March 24, 1978, as site 78001012. It is located at 276 Haili Street in Hilo, coordinates 19°43′18″N 155°5′28″W.

== The museum ==
Almost a century after the missionaries' arrival, a museum was founded in 1931 by their descendants.

In the late 1960s, architect Vladimir Ossipoff designed and built a Museum building adjacent to the mission house. Upon its completion, the Museum moved there and expanded its exhibits. It has extensive displays on Hawaiian culture and is renowned for its collection of shells and minerals, including a specimen of orlymanite, named for Orlando Hammond Lyman (1903–1986), the museum's founder and great grandson of David and Sarah Lyman. The Museum has been an affiliate of the Smithsonian Institution since 2002.
