= ʻŌʻōkala, Hawaii =

Unincorporated community in Hawaii, United States

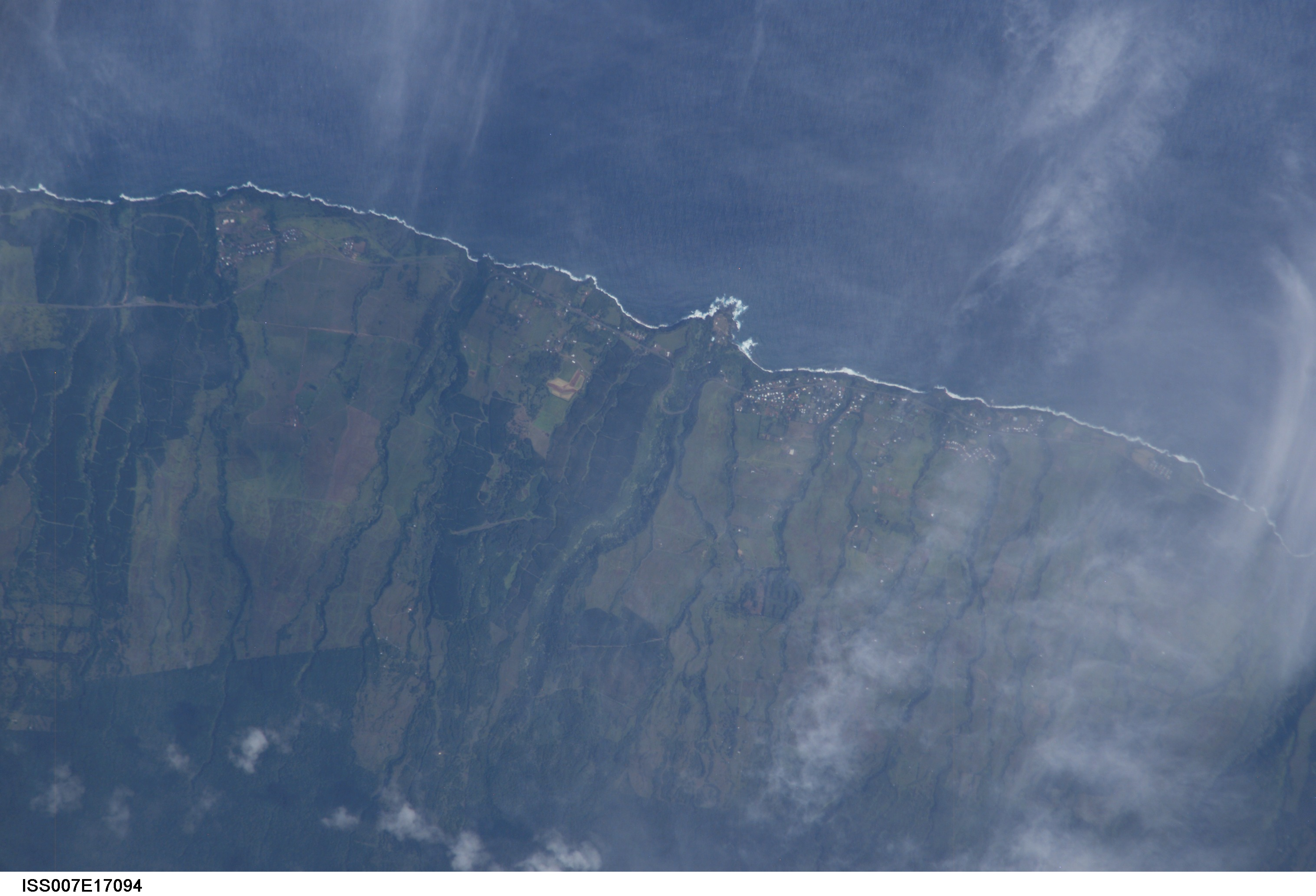
- Hawaii taken during ISS Expedition 7

- Location within Hawaii

Geography
- Location: Sea of Hawaii
- Coordinates: 20°1′3″N 155°17′14″W
- Highest elevation: 371 ft (113.1 m)

ʻŌʻōkala is an unincorporated community on the island of Hawaiʻi in Hawaiʻi County, Hawaii, United States. It lies along Hawaii Route 19 north of Hilo, the county seat of Hawaiʻi County. Its elevation is 371 feet (113 m). Because the community has borne multiple names, the Board on Geographic Names officially designated it "ʻŌʻōkala" in 2000. It has a post office with the ZIP code 96774.

The community was in the news after the Hawaii Department of Health warned that the gulch near the community had contaminated water. This was the result of waste from a nearby dairy draining into the water. More recently the company, Big Island Dairy, has agreed to cease operations, to pay a fine and to remediate environmental concerns to prevent future waste water releases into nearby gulches by June 2019. In 2021 a Hawaiian couple bought assets from the shutdown dairy, with hopes of supporting sustainable agriculture.

== See also ==
- Hamakua Coast
