= Rainbow Falls (Hawaii) =

Waterfall in Hawaii County, Hawaii, United States

Rainbow Falls (Waiānuenue)
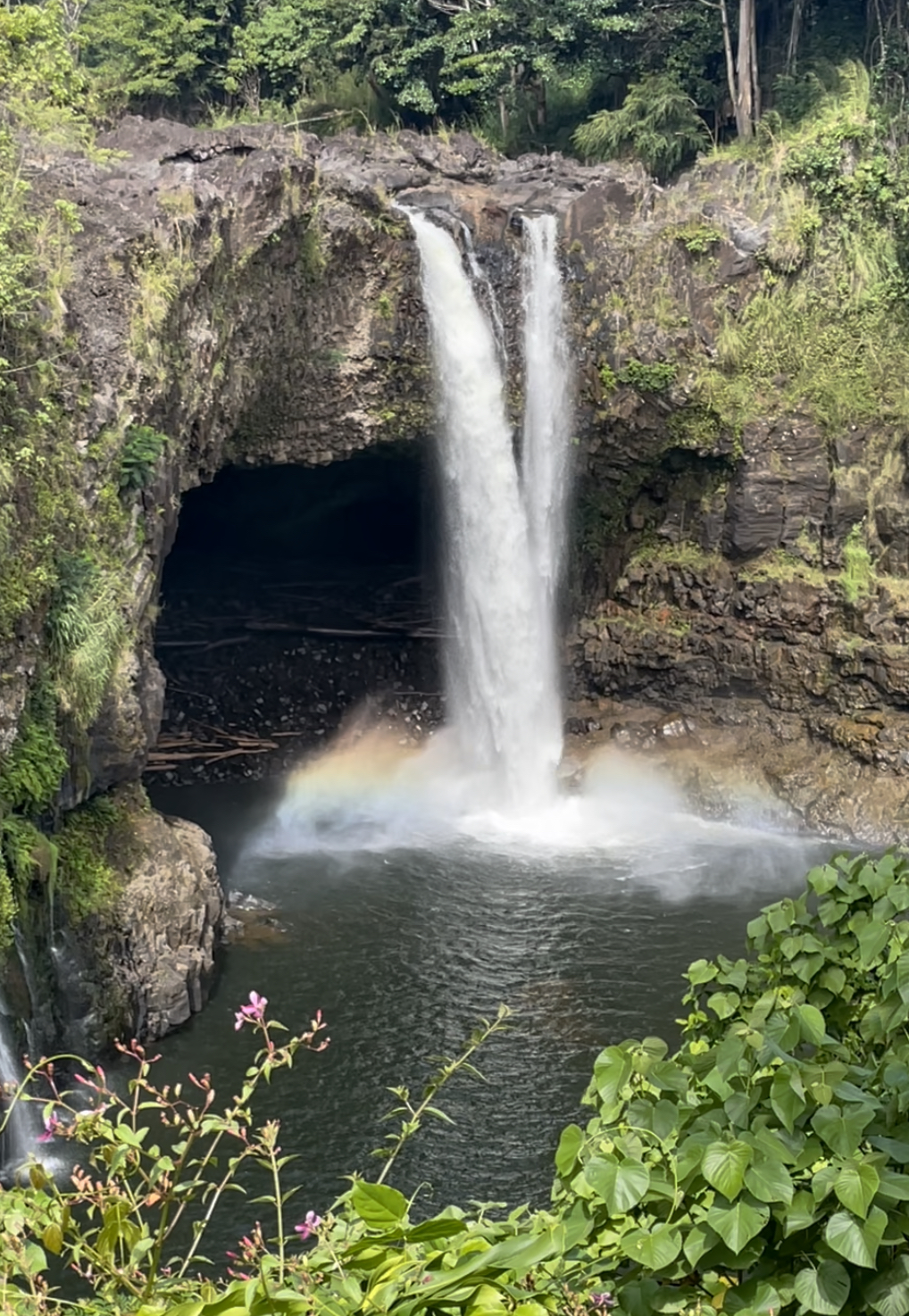
- Rainbow Falls exhibiting its eponymous rainbow prism
- Interactive map of Rainbow Falls (Waiānuenue)
- Location: Hilo, Hawaii, United States
- Coordinates: 19°43′9″N 155°6′34″W
- Type: Plunge
- Number of drops: 1
- Longest drop: 80 ft (24.38 m)
- Watercourse: Wailuku River

Rainbow Falls, or Waiānuenue, is a waterfall located in Hilo, Hawaii. It is 80 ft (24 m) tall and almost 100 ft (30 m) in diameter. The falls are part of the Hawai'i State Parks.

At Rainbow Falls, the Wailuku River rushes into a large pool below. The gorge is blanketed by lush, dense nonnative tropical rainforest and the turquoise-colored pool is bordered by beautiful, although nonnative, wild ginger. Monstera is also in abundance. The falls are accessible via Wailuku River State Park, Waiānuenue Avenue, coordinates 19°43′9″N 155°6′34″W, and are best seen from the park's viewing platform.

Surroundings

Known in the Hawaiian language as Waiānuenue (literally "rainbow water"), the falls flows over a natural lava cave, the mythological home to Hina, an ancient Hawaiian goddess.

Rainbow Falls derives its name from the fact that, on sunny mornings around 10 am, rainbows can be seen in the mist thrown up by the waterfall.

On the walkway which goes to the top of the falls is a massive ancient banyan tree, plus other foliage and banyans.

== See also ==
- List of waterfalls
- List of Hawaii waterfalls
- List of Hawaii state parks
- Akaka Falls
- Umauma Falls
