= Pepeʻekeo, Hawaii =

Census-designated place in Hawaii, U.S.

Pepeʻekeo
- Census-designated place
- Location in Hawaii County and the state of Hawaii
- Coordinates: 19°50′12″N 155°6′19″W
- Country: United States
- State: Hawaii
- County: Hawaii

Area
  - Total: 1.10 sq mi (2.85 km^{2})
  - Land: 1.10 sq mi (2.85 km^{2})
  - Water: 0 sq mi (0.00 km^{2})
- Elevation: 564 ft (172 m)

Population (2020)
  - Total: 1,826
  - Density: 1,661.7/sq mi (641.57/km^{2})
- Time zone: UTC-10 (Hawaii-Aleutian)
- ZIP code: 96783
- Area code: 808
- FIPS code: 15-63650
- GNIS feature ID: 0363247

Pepeʻekeo is a census-designated place (CDP) in Hawaii County, Hawaii, United States. The population was 1,789 at the 2010 census, up from 1,697 at the 2000 census.

== Geography ==
Pepeʻekeo is located on the east side of the island of Hawaii at 19°50′12″N 155°6′19″W (19.836537, -155.105293), along Hawaii Route 19. It is 3.5 miles (5.6 km) south of Honomu, 3 miles (5 km) north of Papaikou, and 7 miles (11 km) north of Hilo.

According to the United States Census Bureau, the CDP has a total area of 1.2 square miles (3.1 km^{2}), all of it land.

== Demographics ==
Historical population
Census	Pop.	Note	%±
1990	1,813		—
2000	1,697		−6.4%
2010	1,789		5.4%
2020	1,826		2.1%
U.S. Decennial Census

As of the census of 2000, there were 1,697 people, 623 households, and 442 families residing in the CDP. The population density was 1,476.3 inhabitants per square mile (570.0/km^{2}). There were 650 housing units at an average density of 565.4 per square mile (218.3/km^{2}). The racial makeup of the CDP was 12.61% White, 0.24% African American, 1.00% Native American, 54.68% Asian, 5.13% Pacific Islander, 0.94% from other races, and 25.40% from two or more races. Hispanic or Latino of any race were 10.02% of the population.

There were 623 households, out of which 29.1% had children under the age of 18 living with them, 45.9% were married couples living together, 17.3% had a female householder with no husband present, and 28.9% were non-families. 25.2% of all households were made up of individuals, and 10.8% had someone living alone who was 65 years of age or older. The average household size was 2.72 and the average family size was 3.20.

In the CDP the population was spread out, with 23.0% under the age of 18, 8.9% from 18 to 24, 23.5% from 25 to 44, 24.1% from 45 to 64, and 20.5% who were 65 years of age or older. The median age was 41 years. For every 100 females, there were 96.0 males. For every 100 females age 18 and over, there were 90.9 males.

The median income for a household in the CDP was $27,946, and the median income for a family was $35,345. Males had a median income of $27,411 versus $22,258 for females. The per capita income for the CDP was $13,037. About 16.9% of families and 20.7% of the population were below the poverty line, including 32.0% of those under age 18 and 9.4% of those age 65 or over.

== See also ==
- List of census-designated places in Hawaii
