= Wailuku River =

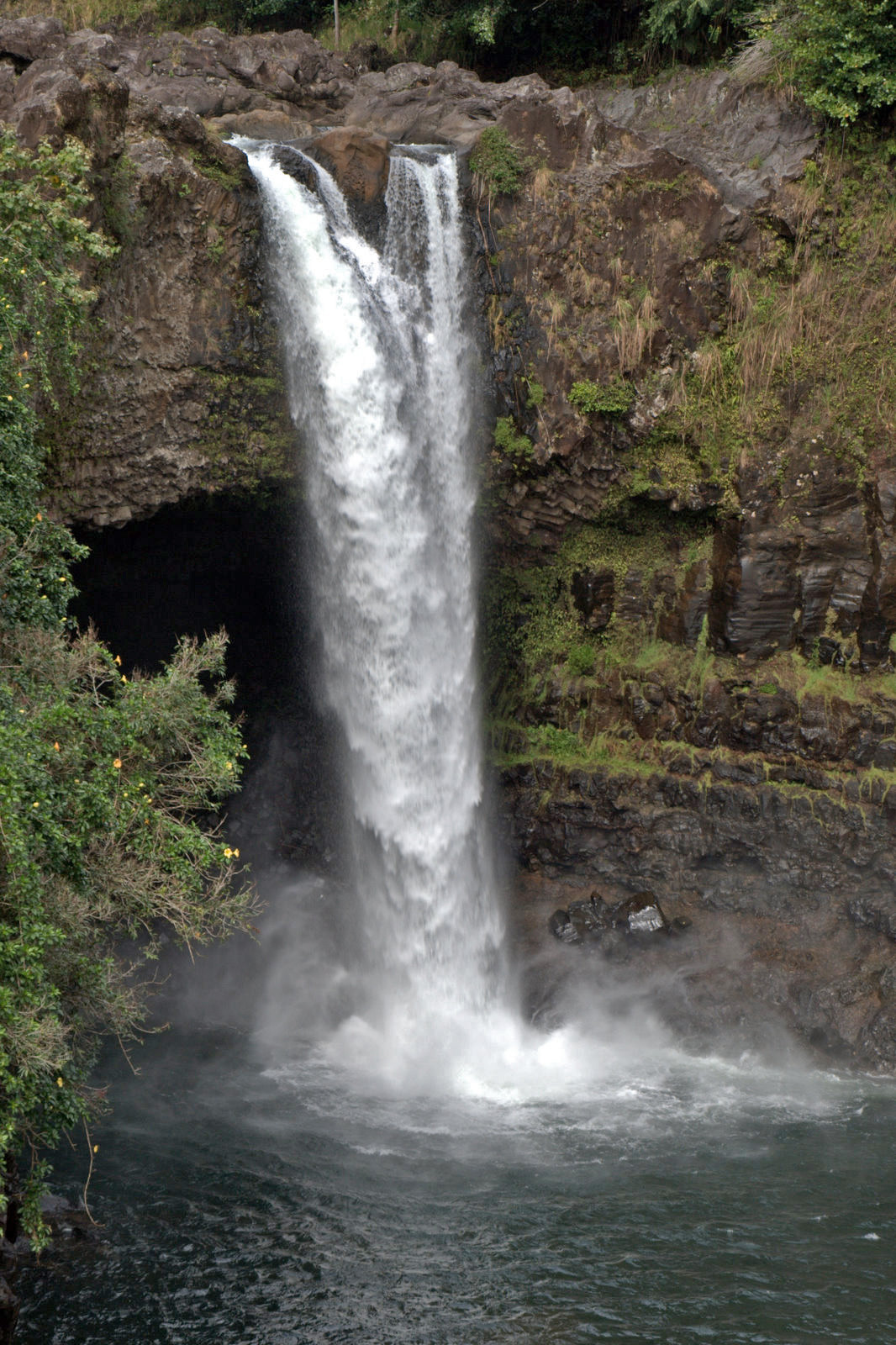
- Waiānuenue (Rainbow) Falls on the Wailuku River

Location
- Country: United States
- State: Hawaii
- Region: Big Island

Physical characteristics
- Source: Slopes of Mauna Kea
  - coordinates: 19°48′26″N 155°25′13″W
- Mouth: Pacific Ocean
  - location: Hilo Bay
  - coordinates: 19°43′40″N 155°5′15″W
- Length: 28.0 mi (45.1 km)
- Basin size: 252.2 sq mi (653 km^{2})
- Discharge
  - average: 275 cu ft/s (7.8 m^{3}/s)
  - maximum: 11,000 cu ft/s (310 m^{3}/s)

The Wailuku River is a 28.0-mile-long (45.1 km) water course on the Island of Hawaiʻi in the Hawaiian Islands. It is the longest river in Hawai'i and the largest in the state by mean discharge. Its course lies mostly along the divide between the lava flows of Mauna Kea and those of Mauna Loa to the south. It arises at about the 10,800 feet (3,300 m) elevation along the eastern slope of Mauna Kea (19°48′26″N 155°25′13″W). It flows generally eastward, descending steeply from the mountain and entering the Pacific Ocean at Hilo.

Wailuku River State Park is located along the lower reach of the river. One section of the park includes Rainbow Falls (19°43′9″N 155°6′34″W), and another section Peʻepeʻe falls and an area called the Boiling Pots (a series of small falls and pools). It is also one of the deadliest bodies of water in the state, as the river is not guarded and can behave unpredictably.

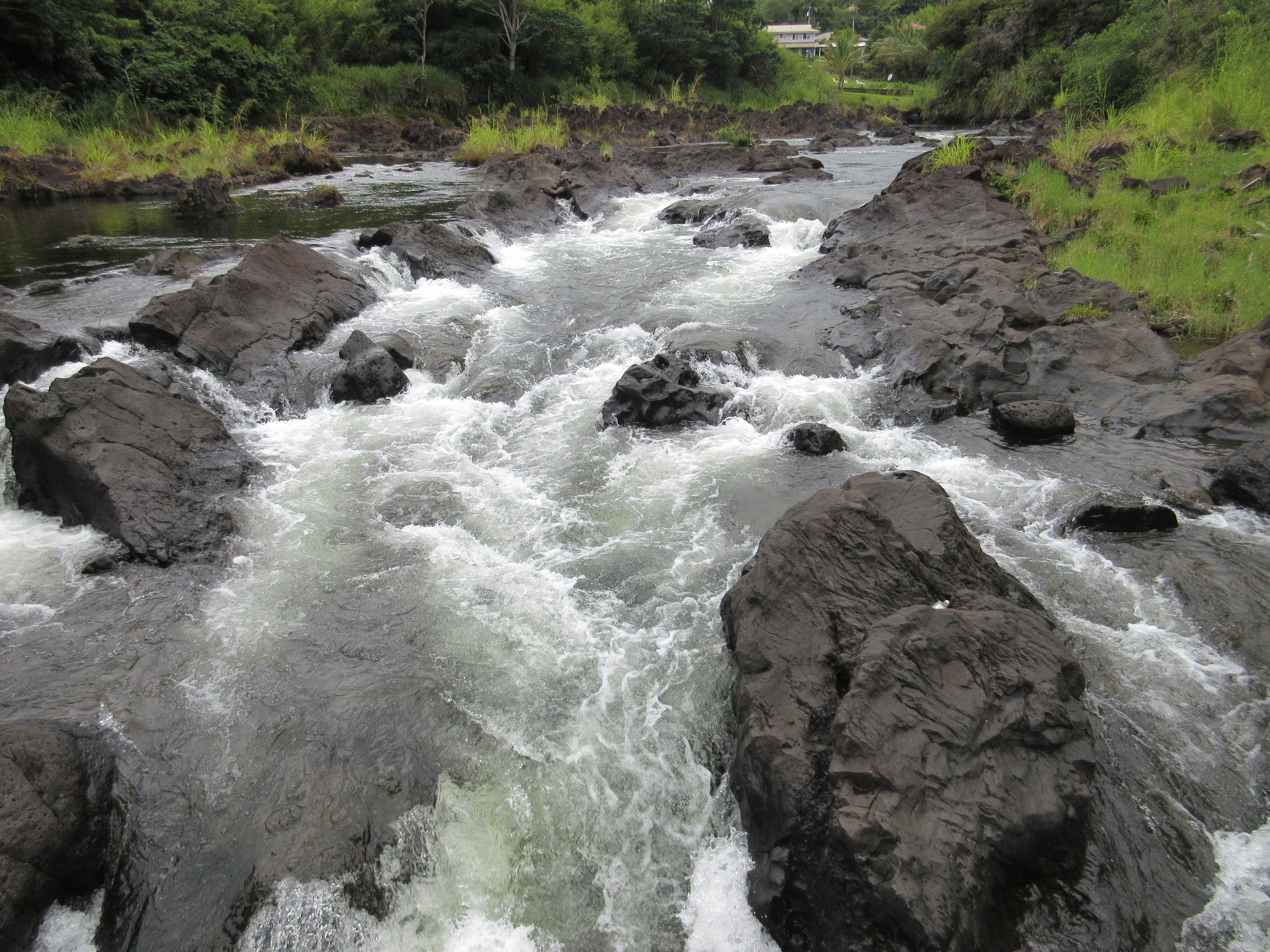
A portion of the Boiling Pots above Pe'epe'e Falls

The lower reach of the river is used for the generation of hydroelectricity. The flow at Hilo averages 275 cubic feet per second (8 m³/s) with peak flows 40 times as great. During hurricane Lala in 2026 the river reached an estimated 69,600 cfs and during Hurricane Lane in 2018 an estimated 82,300 cfs. Water flow is monitored by the USGS. The stream carries an average of 10 tons of suspended sediment into Hilo Bay each day, at 19°43′40″N 155°5′15″W.

The river has been the site of sewage leaks and is the subject of water quality research. Water advisories are posted online by the State of Hawaii. There is a plan for restoration of the Hilo Bay watershed that includes characterization of the Wailuku River.

In the Hawaiian language, wai means fresh water and luku means destruction, so it means essentially River of Destruction. The river can rise into the trees and drop back down very fast. The high flood marks can be seen dated in concrete, on the stairs going down to the river behind the Hilo Public Library.

According to legend, the river was created in a battle between the god Maui and the lizard monster Kuna.

The river is rated Class 5 white water and has been navigated by experts on kayak.

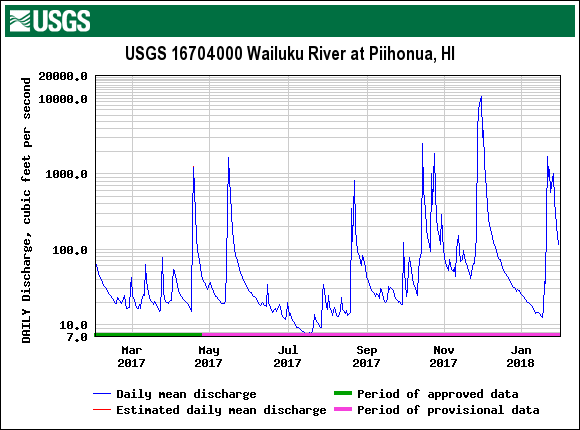
Wailuku River discharge 2017-01-30 to 2018-01-30 at Piihonua Station
