= Wainaku, Hawaii =

Census-designated place in Hawaii, U.S.

Wainaku
- Census-designated place
- Location in Hawaii County and the state of Hawaii
- Coordinates: 19°44′50″N 155°6′3″W
- Country: United States
- State: Hawaii
- County: Hawaii

Area
  - Total: 1.47 sq mi (3.80 km^{2})
  - Land: 1.32 sq mi (3.42 km^{2})
  - Water: 0.15 sq mi (0.38 km^{2})
- Elevation: 256 ft (78 m)

Population (2020)
  - Total: 1,147
  - Density: 868.4/sq mi (335.31/km^{2})
- Time zone: UTC-10 (Hawaii-Aleutian)
- ZIP code: 96720
- Area code: 808
- FIPS code: 15-78950
- GNIS feature ID: 0364808

Wainaku (Hawaiian for 'pushing water') is a census-designated place (CDP) in Hawaiʻi County, Hawaiʻi, United States. The population was 1,147 at the 2020 census.

== Geography ==
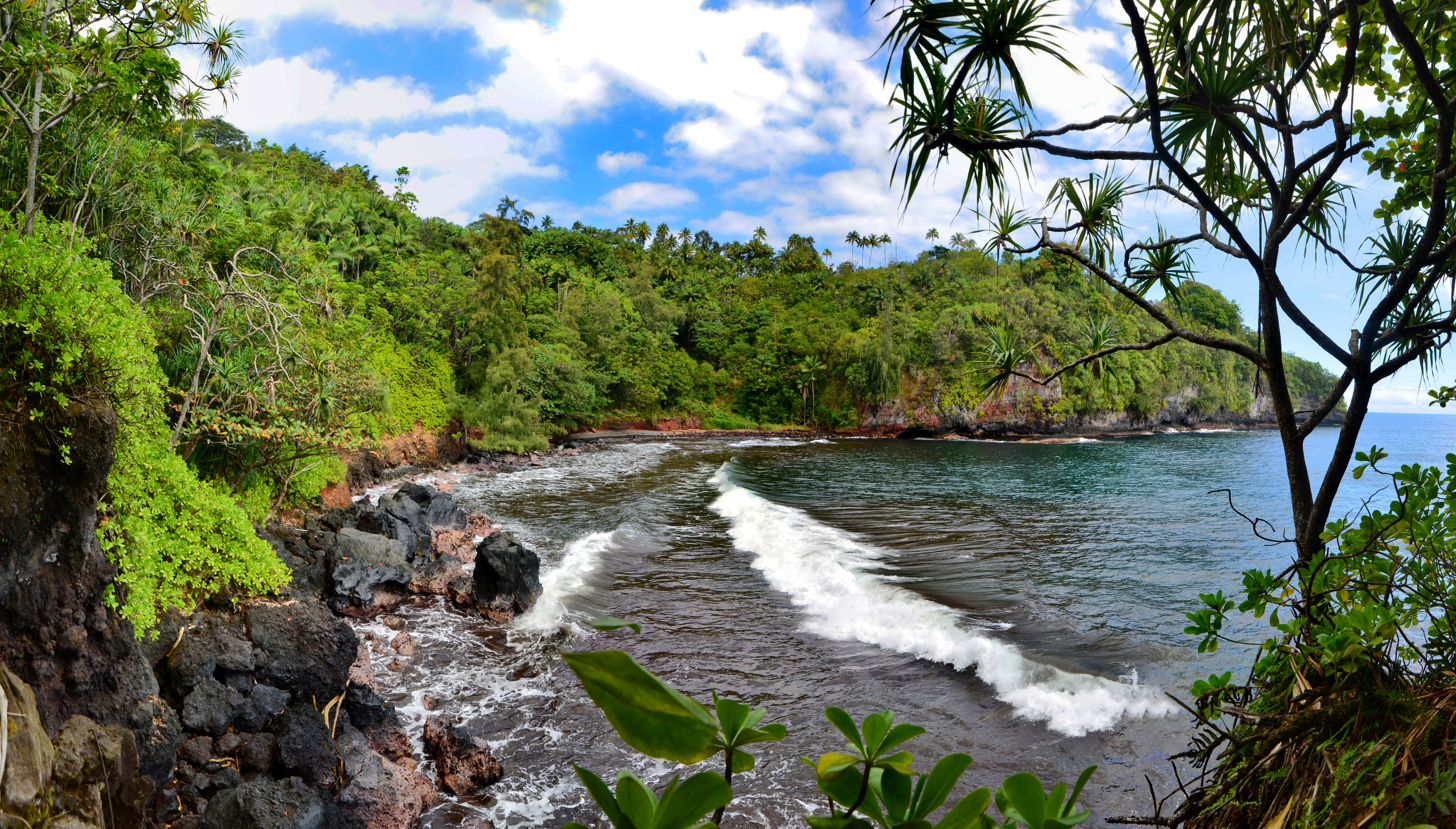
Beach in Waikaku, January 2015

Wainaku is located on the east side of the island of Hawaii at 19°44′50″N 155°6′3″W (19.747258, -155.100954). It is on the west side of Hilo Bay and is bordered by Hilo to the south and Paukaa to the north. Hawaii Route 19 is the main road through the community.

According to the United States Census Bureau, the Wainaku CDP has a total area of 1.5 square miles (3.8 km^{2}), of which 1.3 square miles (3.4 km^{2}) are land and 0.2 square miles (0.4 km^{2}), or 9.99%, are water.

== Demographics ==
Historical population
Census	Pop.	Note	%±
2020	1,147		—
U.S. Decennial Census

=== 2020 census ===
As of the 2020 census, Wainaku had a population of 1,147. The median age was 45.6 years. 18.0% of residents were under the age of 18 and 24.8% of residents were 65 years of age or older. For every 100 females there were 94.1 males, and for every 100 females age 18 and over there were 89.5 males age 18 and over.

95.2% of residents lived in urban areas, while 4.8% lived in rural areas.

There were 410 households in Wainaku, of which 29.3% had children under the age of 18 living in them. Of all households, 44.6% were married-couple households, 15.4% were households with a male householder and no spouse or partner present, and 31.2% were households with a female householder and no spouse or partner present. About 22.9% of all households were made up of individuals and 12.7% had someone living alone who was 65 years of age or older.

There were 466 housing units, of which 12.0% were vacant. The homeowner vacancy rate was 0.0% and the rental vacancy rate was 14.9%.

Racial composition as of the 2020 census
Race	Number	Percent
White	231	20.1%
Black or African American	7	0.6%
American Indian and Alaska Native	5	0.4%
Asian	449	39.1%
Native Hawaiian and Other Pacific Islander	94	8.2%
Some other race	11	1.0%
Two or more races	350	30.5%
Hispanic or Latino (of any race)	147	12.8%

=== 2000 census ===
As of the census of 2000, there were 1,227 people, 422 households, and 316 families residing in the CDP. The population density was 932.9 inhabitants per square mile (360.2/km^{2}). There were 453 housing units at an average density of 344.4 per square mile (133.0/km^{2}). The racial makeup of the CDP was 19.72% White, 0.16% African American, 0.41% Native American, 45.97% Asian, 6.44% Pacific Islander, 0.24% from other races, and 27.06% from two or more races. Hispanic or Latino of any race were 8.48% of the population.

There were 422 households, out of which 27.0% had children under the age of 18 living with them, 53.1% were married couples living together, 15.2% had a female householder with no husband present, and 24.9% were non-families. 21.1% of all households were made up of individuals, and 11.1% had someone living alone who was 65 years of age or older. The average household size was 2.91 and the average family size was 3.36.

In the CDP the population was spread out, with 22.0% under the age of 18, 8.9% from 18 to 24, 23.6% from 25 to 44, 24.2% from 45 to 64, and 21.4% who were 65 years of age or older. The median age was 43 years. For every 100 females, there were 97.9 males. For every 100 females age 18 and over, there were 96.9 males.

The median income for a household in the CDP was $42,292, and the median income for a family was $52,946. Males had a median income of $29,792 versus $23,750 for females. The per capita income for the CDP was $19,296. About 6.9% of families and 12.5% of the population were below the poverty line, including 23.0% of those under age 18 and 10.2% of those age 65 or over.

== See also ==
- List of places in Hawaii
