= Pacific Tsunami Museum =

Museum in Hilo, Hawaii, United States

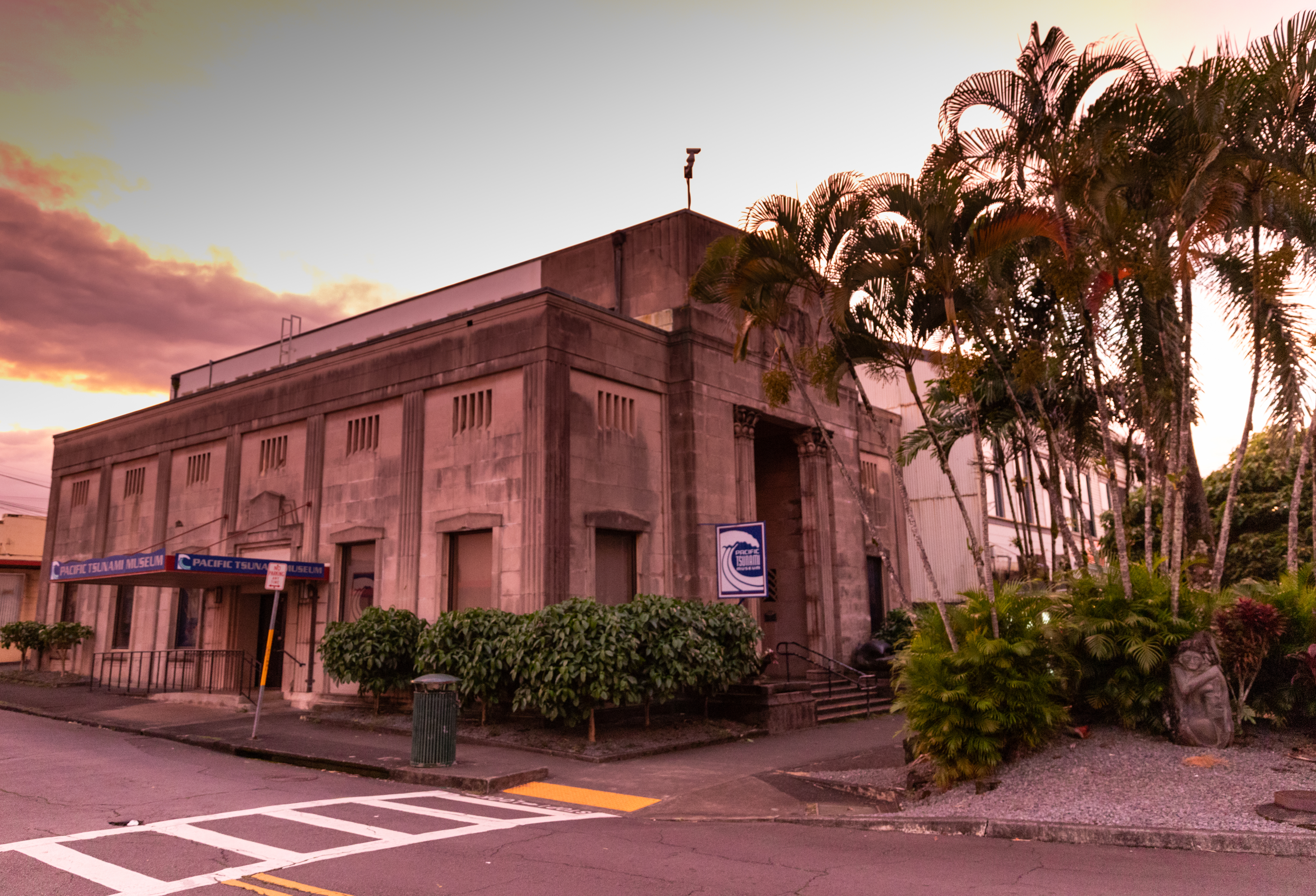
- The Pacific Tsunami Museum is housed in a former First Hawaiian Bank building in downtown Hilo, Hawaii
- Former name: Hilo Tsunami Museum
- Established: 31 August 1994
- Location: 130 Kamehameha Avenue; Hilo, Hawaii
- Coordinates: 19°43′33″N 155°5′12″W
- Visitors: more than 20,000/yr
- Founder: Jeanne Branch Johnston; Dr. Walter Dudley
- Executive director: Susan MG Tissot (1994-1998); Donna Saiki (1998–2013); Marlene Murray (2013-2022; Cindi Preller (2022+)
- Architect: Charles W. Dickey
- Website: tsunami.org

The Pacific Tsunami Museum (originally, the Hilo Tsunami Museum) is a museum in Hilo, Hawaii dedicated to the history of the April 1, 1946 Pacific tsunami and the May 23, 1960 Chilean tsunami which devastated much of the east coast of the Big Island, especially Hilo. The museum also has a mission to educate people in general about tsunamis, including the 2004 Indian Ocean earthquake and tsunami. It is located at 130 Kamehameha Avenue, at the intersection of Kamehameha and Kalakaua in downtown Hilo.

One of the founders of the museum, Dr. Walter Dudley, serves as chairman of the museum's Scientific Advisory Council and is the President of the Board.

== History ==
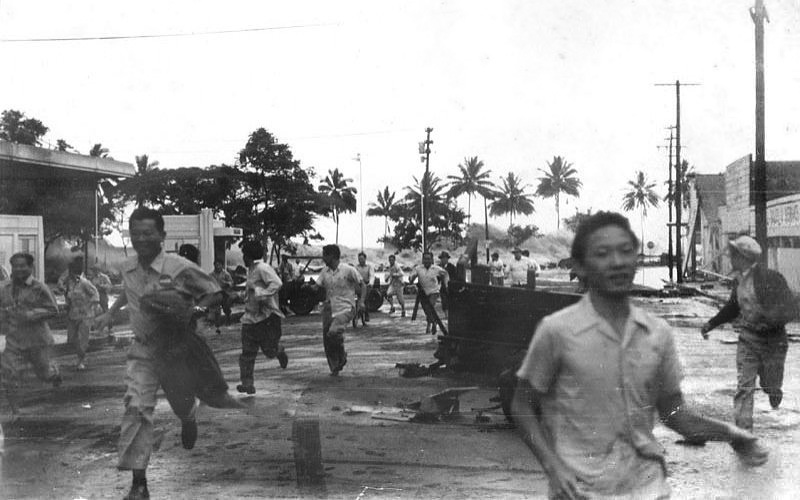
The 1946 Tsunami in Hilo

The museum traces its origins to 1988, when Dr. Walter Dudley, a professor at the University of Hawaii–Hilo, was soliciting survivor stories from the community for his book Tsunami!. Dr. Dudley would later publish additional chronicles of tsunami survivors.

Jeanne Branch Johnston, a tsunami survivor, decided there was a need for a tsunami museum in 1993 and formed a steering committee; she and Dr. Dudley co-founded the museum that year. The museum was incorporated in August 1994; partners include the International Tsunami Information Center, the Pacific Tsunami Warning Center, the University of Hawaiʻi (both the Hilo and Manoa campuses), and State and County Civil Defense Agencies. Early solicitations for fundraising were for the Hilo Tsunami Museum. Johnston, Dudley, and Michael Childers began compiling an oral history of tsunami survivors from Hawaiʻi, Alaska, India, Sri Lanka, Thailand, and the Maldives, with more than 450 survivor stories archived at the museum.

On May 22, 1997, First Hawaiian Bank announced it would donate its Kamehameha Branch building as the permanent site for the museum. The building, originally completed in 1930 to a design by local architect Charles W. Dickey, was turned over to the museum in December, and the museum opened to the public in June 1998. Funds for the renovation were provided in part by the Federal Emergency Management Agency under its Hazard Mitigation Grant Program. Previously, temporary exhibits were shown at the nearby S. H. Kress & Co. building. The ex-Bank building is approximately 5,300 ft^{2} (490 m^{2}), with exhibits on the ground floor; the basement is used mostly for storage, and the upper floor is used for offices and archives.

Susan MG Tissot played a significant role in the establishment of the Pacific Tsunami Museum. She joined the museum’s steering committee in 1993 and served as its executive director from 1994 to 1998. During her tenure, she coordinated advertising, public outreach, and fundraising campaigns to build community support and secure financial resources for the museum. These efforts contributed to the museum’s establishment in the historic First Hawaiian Bank building in downtown Hilo in 1997. She also secured funding from the Federal Emergency Management Agency (FEMA) to support renovations of the building and development of the museum’s initial exhibits, helping establish a permanent institution dedicated to tsunami history, public education, and disaster preparedness. Donna Saiki (née Weiss), who was the principal at Hilo High School from 1988 to 1996, served as the second executive director of the museum starting in 1998 until June 2013. Saiki recruited members, volunteers, and donors; her husband Ronald was a youth sports coach in Keaukaha. Marlene Murray succeeded Saiki as the executive director in June 2013. The museum building was retrofitted with photovoltaic arrays in 2014. A new science room was added in April 2016.

The museum was closed temporarily due to the COVID-19 pandemic in Hawaii, and reopened with permanent hours in March 2023. Several exhibits have been renovated and expanded, including a new exhibit about Hawaii's natural hazards. There are plans to establish a new exhibit about the 2022 Hunga Tonga–Hunga Haʻapai eruption and tsunami. In November 2024, the board of the museum laid off its 10-person staff and suspended operations; some former employees volunteered their labor to keep it open.
