= Hilo, Hawaii =

Census-designated place in United States

Hilo
- County seat Census-designated place
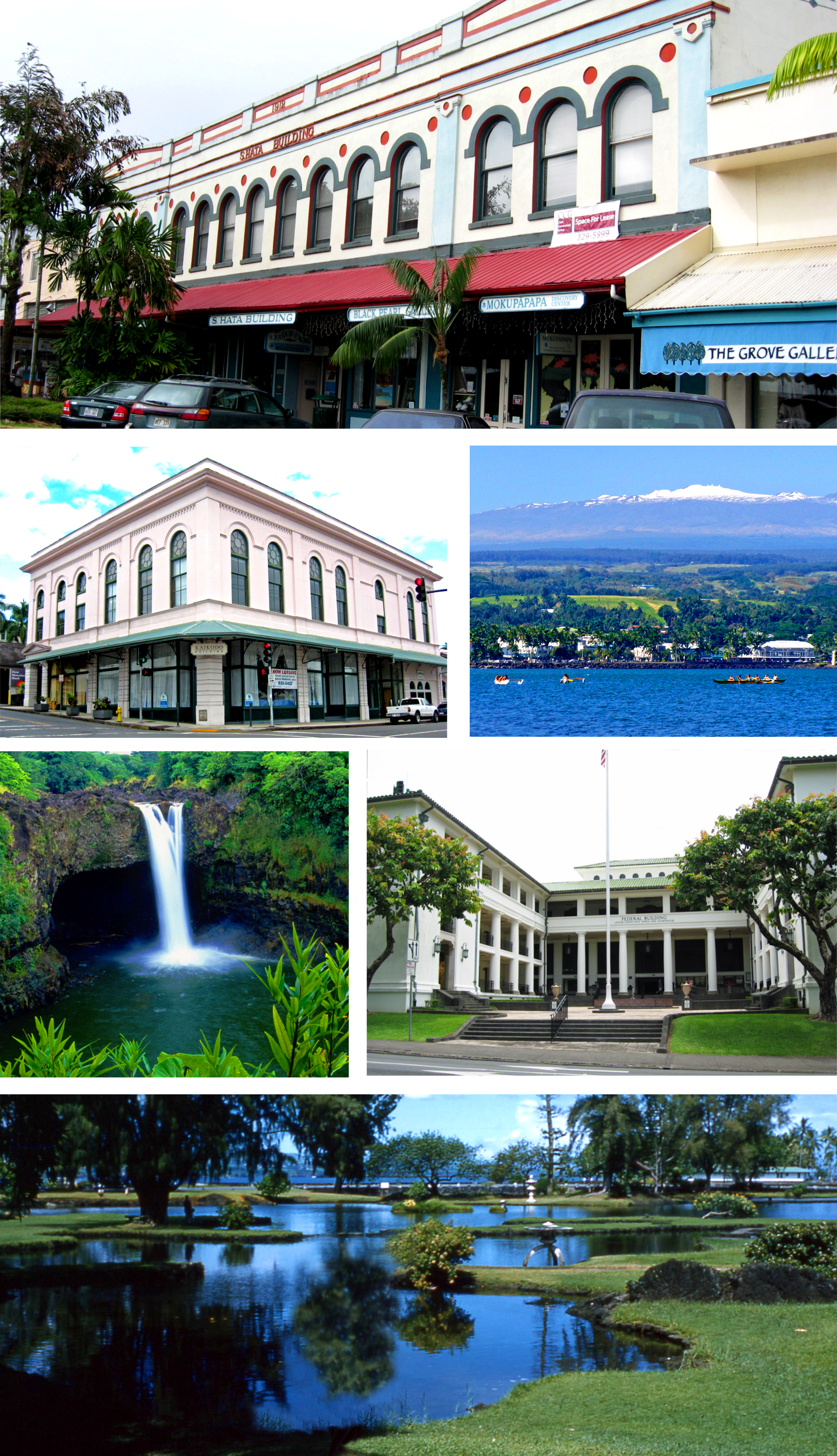
- From top to bottom, left to right: S. Hata Building, Hilo Masonic Lodge Hall-Bishop Trust Building, Hilo Bay with Mauna Kea, Rainbow (Waiānuenue) Falls, Federal Building, Post Office and Courthouse and Liliuokalani Park and Gardens.

- Location within Hawaii County and Hawaii

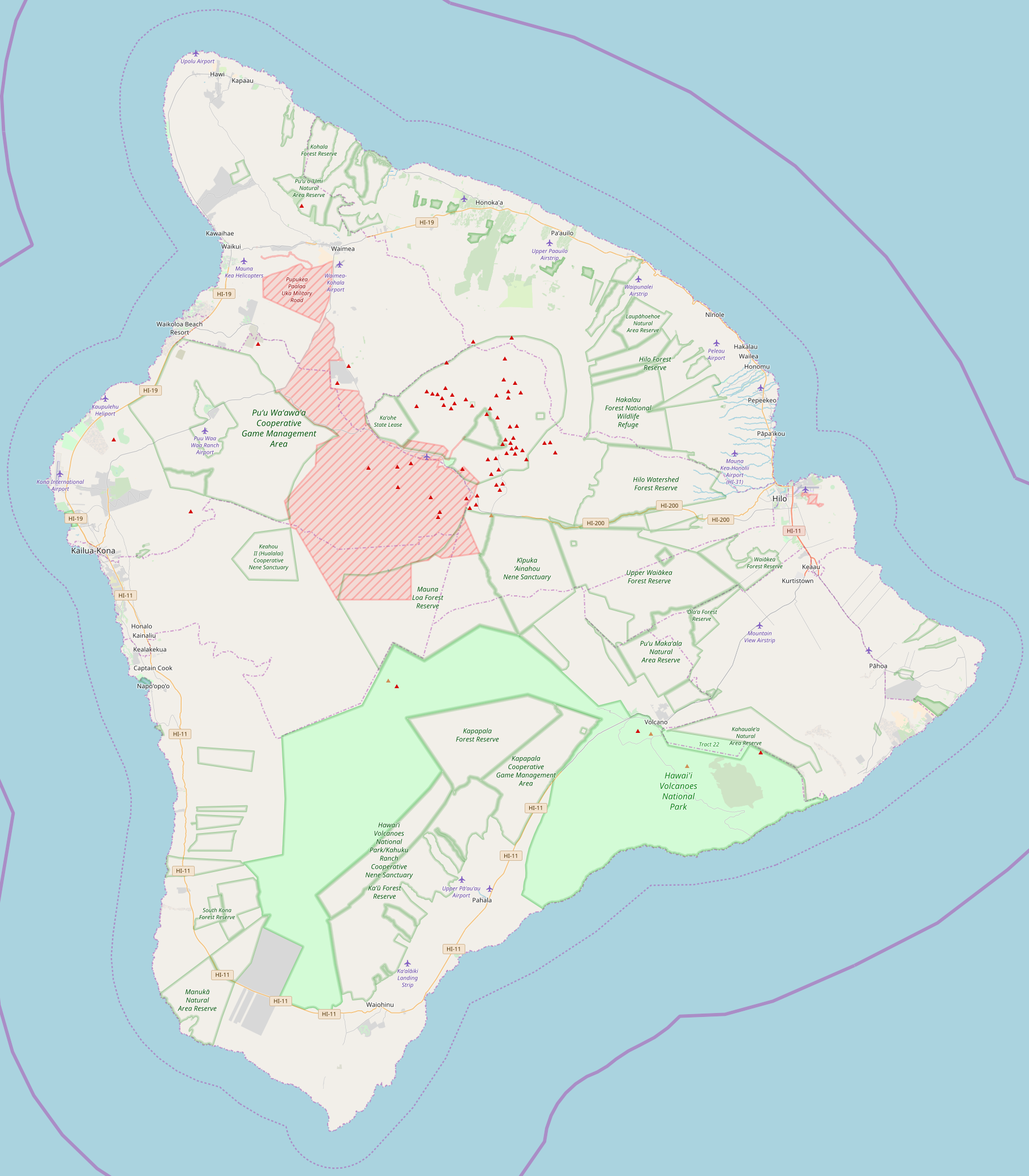
- Location within Hawaii Location within Hawaii (island)
- Coordinates: 19°42′20″N 155°5′9″W
- Country: United States
- State: Hawaii
- County: Hawaii

Government
  - Mayor: Kimo Alameda

Area
  - Total: 58.3 sq mi (151.0 km^{2})
  - Land: 53.4 sq mi (138.3 km^{2})
  - Water: 4.9 sq mi (12.7 km^{2})
- Elevation: 20 ft (6.1 m)

Population (2020)
  - Total: 44,186
  - Density: 827.5/sq mi (319.5/km^{2})
- Time zone: UTC−10 (Hawaii-Aleutian)
- ZIP Codes: 96720, 96721
- Area code: 808
- FIPS code: 15-14650
- GNIS ID: 359187

Hilo (/ˈhiː.loʊ/, HEE-low; Hawaiian pronunciation: [ˈhilo]) is the largest settlement in and the county seat of Hawaiʻi County, Hawaii, United States, which encompasses the Island of Hawaiʻi. For statistical purposes, the United States Census Bureau has defined the community as a census-designated place (CDP). The population was 44,186 according to the 2020 census. It is the fourth-largest settlement in the state of Hawaiʻi, the largest settlement in the state outside of Oahu, and the largest settlement in the state outside of the Greater Honolulu Area.

Hilo is in the District of South Hilo. The city overlooks Hilo Bay and has views of two shield volcanoes – Mauna Loa, the largest active volcano on the planet, and Mauna Kea, the highest point in the Hawaiian Islands. The Hilo bayfront has been destroyed by tsunamis twice. The majority of human settlement in Hilo stretches from Hilo Bay to Waiākea-Uka, on the flanks of the volcanoes.

Hilo is home to the University of Hawaiʻi at Hilo, ʻImiloa Astronomy Center, as well as the Merrie Monarch Festival, a week-long celebration, including three nights of competition, of ancient and modern hula that takes place annually after Easter. Hilo is also home to the Mauna Loa Macadamia Nut Corporation, one of the world's leading producers of macadamia nuts. Hilo is served by Hilo International Airport.

== History ==
Around 1100 AD, the first Hilo inhabitants arrived, bringing with them Polynesian knowledge and traditions. Although archaeological evidence is scant, oral history has many references to people living in Hilo, along the Wailuku and Wailoa rivers during the time of ancient Hawaiʻi. Oral history gives the meaning of Hilo as "to twist".

Originally, the name "Hilo" applied to a district encompassing much of the east coast of the island of Hawaiʻi, now divided into the District of South Hilo and the District of North Hilo. When William Ellis visited in 1823, the main settlement there was Waiākea on the south shore of Hilo Bay. Missionaries came to the district in the early-to-middle 19th century, founding Haili Church.

Hilo expanded as sugar plantations in the surrounding area created jobs and drew in many workers from Asia. For example, by 1887, 26,000 Chinese workers worked in Hawai'i's sugar cane plantations, one of which was the Hilo Sugar Mill. At that time, the Hilo Sugar Mill produced 3,500 tons of sugar annually.

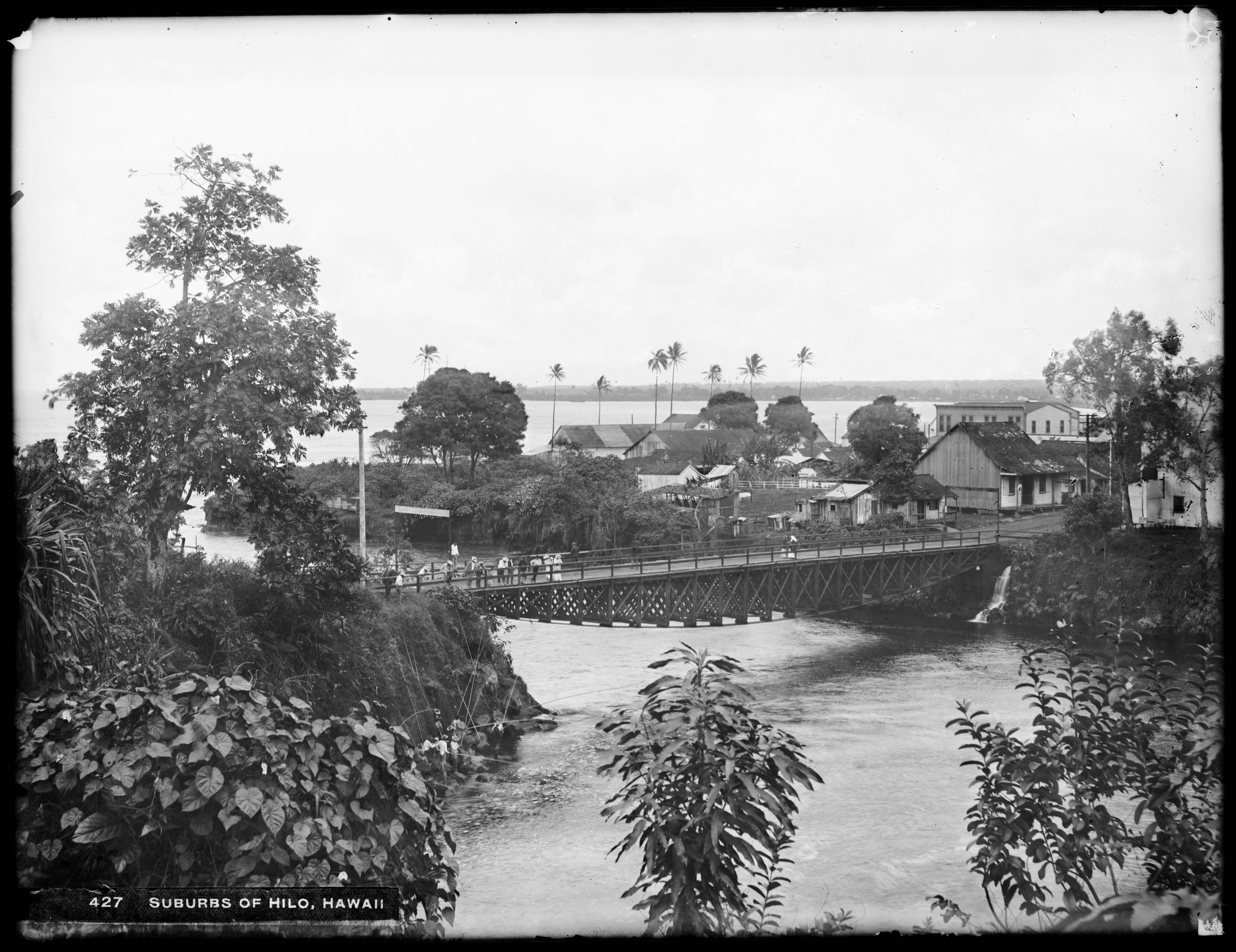
Hilo, Hawaii, 1907

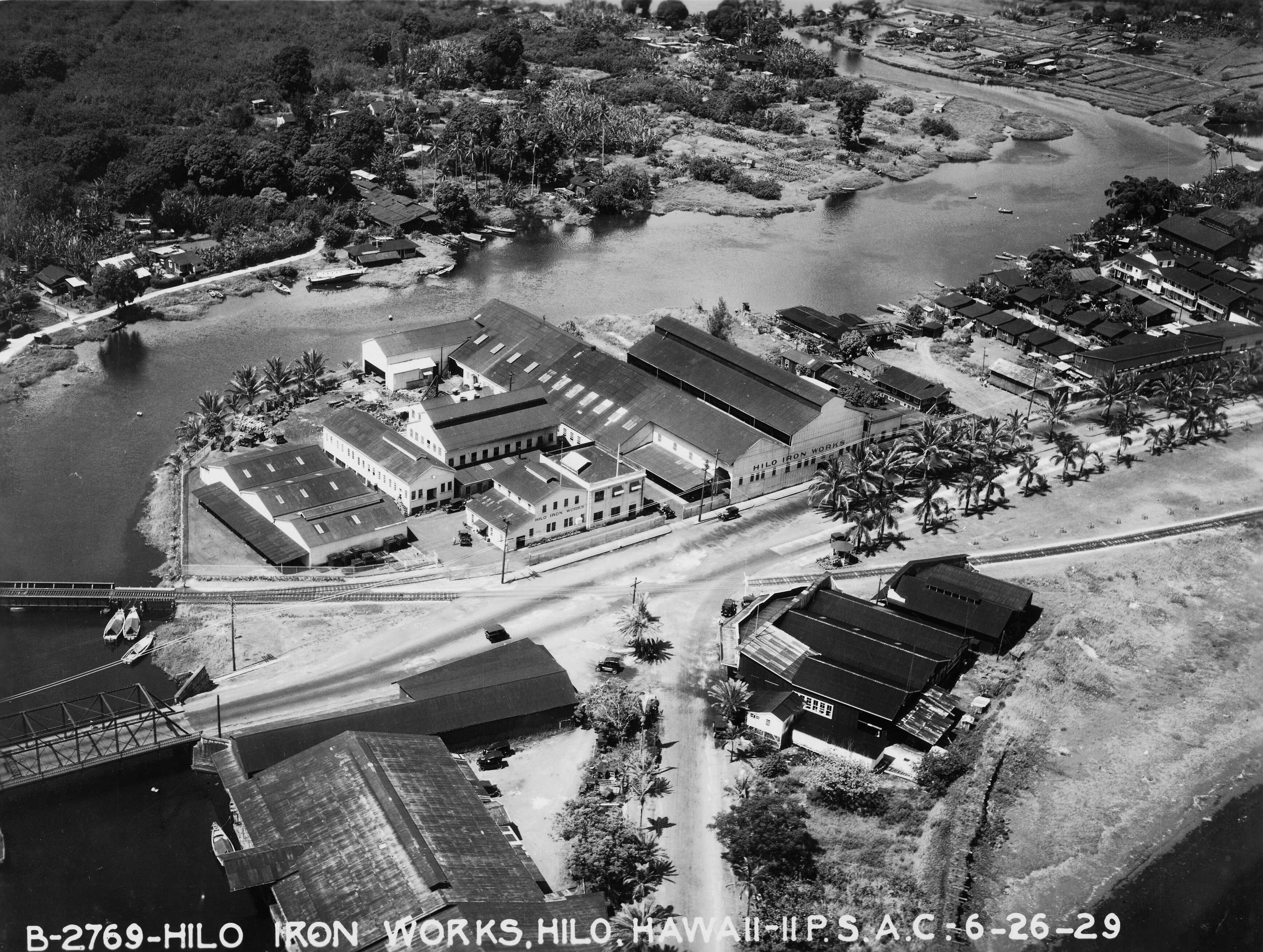
Hilo Iron Works, 1929

A breakwater across Hilo Bay was begun in the first decade of the 20th century and completed in 1929. On April 1, 1946, an 8.6-magnitude earthquake near the Aleutian Islands created a 46-foot-high (14 m) tsunami that hit Hilo 4.9 hours later, killing 159 total in the islands, with 96 deaths in Hilo alone. In response, an early warning system, the Pacific Tsunami Warning Center, was established in 1949 to track these killer waves and provide warning. This tsunami also caused the end of the Hawaii Consolidated Railway, and instead the Hawaiʻi Belt Road was built north of Hilo using some of the old railbed.

On May 22, 1960, another tsunami, caused by a 9.5-magnitude earthquake off the coast of Chile that day, claimed 61 lives, allegedly due to the failure of people to heed warning sirens. Low-lying bayfront areas of the city on Waiākea peninsula and along Hilo Bay, previously populated, were rededicated as parks and memorials.

Hilo expanded inland beginning in the 1960s. The downtown found a new role in the 1980s as the city's cultural center with several galleries and museums opening; the Palace Theater reopened in 1998 as an arthouse cinema movie palace.

Closure of the sugar plantations (including those in Hāmākua) during the 1990s hurt the local economy, coinciding with a general statewide slump. Hilo in recent years has seen commercial and population growth.

== Geography ==
Hilo is on the eastern and windward side of the island. It is classified by the US Census Bureau as a census-designated place (CDP), and has a total area of 58.3 square miles (151.0 km^{2}), 53.4 square miles (138.3 km^{2}) of which is land and 4.9 square miles (12.7 km^{2}) of which (8.4%) is water.

=== Climate ===
Hilo has a tropical rainforest climate (Köppen: Af), with substantial rainfall throughout the year. Its location on the windward coast (relative to the trade winds), makes it the fourth-wettest city in the United States, behind the southeast Alaskan cities of Whittier, Ketchikan and Yakutat, and one of the wettest in the world. An average of around 126.72 inches (3,220 mm) of rain fell at Hilo International Airport annually between 1981 and 2010, with 272 days of the year receiving some rain. Rainfall in Hilo varies with altitude, with more at higher elevations. At some weather stations in upper Hilo the annual rainfall is above 200 inches (5,100 mm).

Monthly mean temperatures range from 71.2 °F (21.8 °C) in February to 76.4 °F (24.7 °C) in August. The highest recorded temperature was 94 °F (34 °C) on May 20, 1996, and the lowest 53 °F (12 °C) on February 21, 1962. The wettest year was 1994 with 182.81 inches (4,643.4 mm), and the driest was 1983, with 68.09 inches (1,729.5 mm). The most rainfall in one month was 50.82 inches (1,290.8 mm) in December 1954. The most rainfall in 24 hours was 27.24 inches (691.9 mm) on November 2, 2000.

Hilo's location on the shore of the funnel-shaped Hilo Bay also makes it vulnerable to tsunamis.

Climate data for Hilo International Airport, Hawaii (1991–2020 normals, (Note: Mean monthly maxima and minima (i.e. the expected highest and lowest temperature readings at any point during the year or given month) calculated based on data at said location from 1991 to 2020.) extremes 1949–present)
| Month | Jan | Feb | Mar | Apr | May | Jun | Jul | Aug | Sep | Oct | Nov | Dec | Year |
|---|---|---|---|---|---|---|---|---|---|---|---|---|---|
| Record high °F (°C) | 92 (33) | 92 (33) | 93 (34) | 89 (32) | 94 (34) | 90 (32) | 93 (34) | 93 (34) | 93 (34) | 91 (33) | 94 (34) | 93 (34) | 94 (34) |
| Mean maximum °F (°C) | 85.2 (29.6) | 84.8 (29.3) | 85.0 (29.4) | 84.1 (28.9) | 85.4 (29.7) | 85.7 (29.8) | 87.1 (30.6) | 87.2 (30.7) | 87.7 (30.9) | 87.4 (30.8) | 85.9 (29.9) | 84.2 (29.0) | 89.6 (32.0) |
| Mean daily maximum °F (°C) | 78.7 (25.9) | 78.4 (25.8) | 78.5 (25.8) | 79.0 (26.1) | 80.7 (27.1) | 81.8 (27.7) | 82.8 (28.2) | 82.9 (28.3) | 83.3 (28.5) | 82.4 (28.0) | 80.3 (26.8) | 78.8 (26.0) | 80.6 (27.0) |
| Daily mean °F (°C) | 71.4 (21.9) | 71.2 (21.8) | 71.9 (22.2) | 72.5 (22.5) | 74.0 (23.3) | 75.2 (24.0) | 76.3 (24.6) | 76.6 (24.8) | 76.5 (24.7) | 75.7 (24.3) | 74.0 (23.3) | 72.2 (22.3) | 74.0 (23.3) |
| Mean daily minimum °F (°C) | 64.1 (17.8) | 64.1 (17.8) | 65.2 (18.4) | 66.1 (18.9) | 67.3 (19.6) | 68.7 (20.4) | 69.9 (21.1) | 70.4 (21.3) | 69.8 (21.0) | 69.0 (20.6) | 67.6 (19.8) | 65.7 (18.7) | 67.3 (19.6) |
| Mean minimum °F (°C) | 59.3 (15.2) | 59.1 (15.1) | 61.1 (16.2) | 62.4 (16.9) | 63.6 (17.6) | 65.2 (18.4) | 66.1 (18.9) | 66.7 (19.3) | 66.1 (18.9) | 65.2 (18.4) | 63.4 (17.4) | 61.3 (16.3) | 58.2 (14.6) |
| Record low °F (°C) | 54 (12) | 53 (12) | 54 (12) | 58 (14) | 58 (14) | 61 (16) | 62 (17) | 63 (17) | 61 (16) | 62 (17) | 58 (14) | 55 (13) | 53 (12) |
| Average precipitation inches (mm) | 7.86 (200) | 10.22 (260) | 12.68 (322) | 9.40 (239) | 6.99 (178) | 7.30 (185) | 9.24 (235) | 11.30 (287) | 8.70 (221) | 10.24 (260) | 14.39 (366) | 12.07 (307) | 120.39 (3,058) |
| Average precipitation days (≥ 0.01 in) | 15.7 | 16.6 | 21.8 | 24.5 | 22.9 | 25.4 | 26.6 | 27.2 | 23.3 | 23.4 | 23.3 | 22.3 | 273.0 |
| Average relative humidity (%) | 76.6 | 76.0 | 78.1 | 80.2 | 78.9 | 77.4 | 79.5 | 79.5 | 79.2 | 80.0 | 80.3 | 78.7 | 78.7 |
| Average dew point °F (°C) | 62.8 (17.1) | 62.4 (16.9) | 63.7 (17.6) | 65.1 (18.4) | 66.0 (18.9) | 66.7 (19.3) | 68.2 (20.1) | 68.5 (20.3) | 68.4 (20.2) | 68.0 (20.0) | 66.6 (19.2) | 64.2 (17.9) | 65.9 (18.8) |
| Mean monthly sunshine hours | 161.0 | 152.0 | 152.7 | 135.9 | 155.0 | 176.9 | 167.2 | 174.9 | 161.5 | 136.3 | 115.0 | 129.0 | 1,817.4 |
| Percentage possible sunshine | 47 | 47 | 41 | 36 | 38 | 44 | 41 | 44 | 44 | 38 | 34 | 38 | 41 |
Source: NOAA (relative humidity, dew points and sun 1961–1990)

See or edit raw graph data.

== Demographics ==
Historical population
| Census | Pop. | Note | %± |
|---|---|---|---|
| 1910 | 6,745 | | — |
| 1920 | 10,431 | | 54.6% |
| 1930 | 19,468 | | 86.6% |
| 1940 | 23,353 | | 20.0% |
| 1950 | 27,198 | | 16.5% |
| 1960 | 25,966 | | −4.5% |
| 1970 | 26,353 | | 1.5% |
| 1980 | 35,269 | | 33.8% |
| 1990 | 37,808 | | 7.2% |
| 2000 | 40,759 | | 7.8% |
| 2010 | 43,263 | | 6.1% |
| 2020 | 44,186 | | 2.1% |

=== 2020 census ===
As of the 2020 census, Hilo had a population of 44,186. The median age was 42.7 years; 4.5% of residents were under the age of 5, 20.8% were under 18, and 23.4% were 65 years of age or older. For every 100 females there were 94.2 males, and for every 100 females age 18 and over there were 91.3 males age 18 and over. Females made up 51.1% of the population.

87.6% of residents lived in urban areas, while 12.4% lived in rural areas.

There were 16,132 households, of which 29.1% had children under the age of 18 living in them. Of all households, 42.0% were married-couple households, 19.8% were households with a male householder and no spouse or partner present, and 29.8% were households with a female householder and no spouse or partner present. About 28.0% of all households were made up of individuals and 15.0% had someone living alone who was 65 years of age or older. The average household size was 2.71.

There were 17,732 housing units, of which 9.0% were vacant. The homeowner vacancy rate was 0.9% and the rental vacancy rate was 5.9%.

Racial composition as of the 2020 census
| Race | Number | Percent |
|---|---|---|
| White | 7,242 | 16.4% |
| Black or African American | 248 | 0.6% |
| American Indian and Alaska Native | 134 | 0.3% |
| Asian | 13,736 | 31.1% |
| Native Hawaiian and Other Pacific Islander | 6,892 | 15.6% |
| Some other race | 506 | 1.1% |
| Two or more races | 15,428 | 34.9% |
| Hispanic or Latino (of any race) | 5,065 | 11.5% |

== Transportation ==
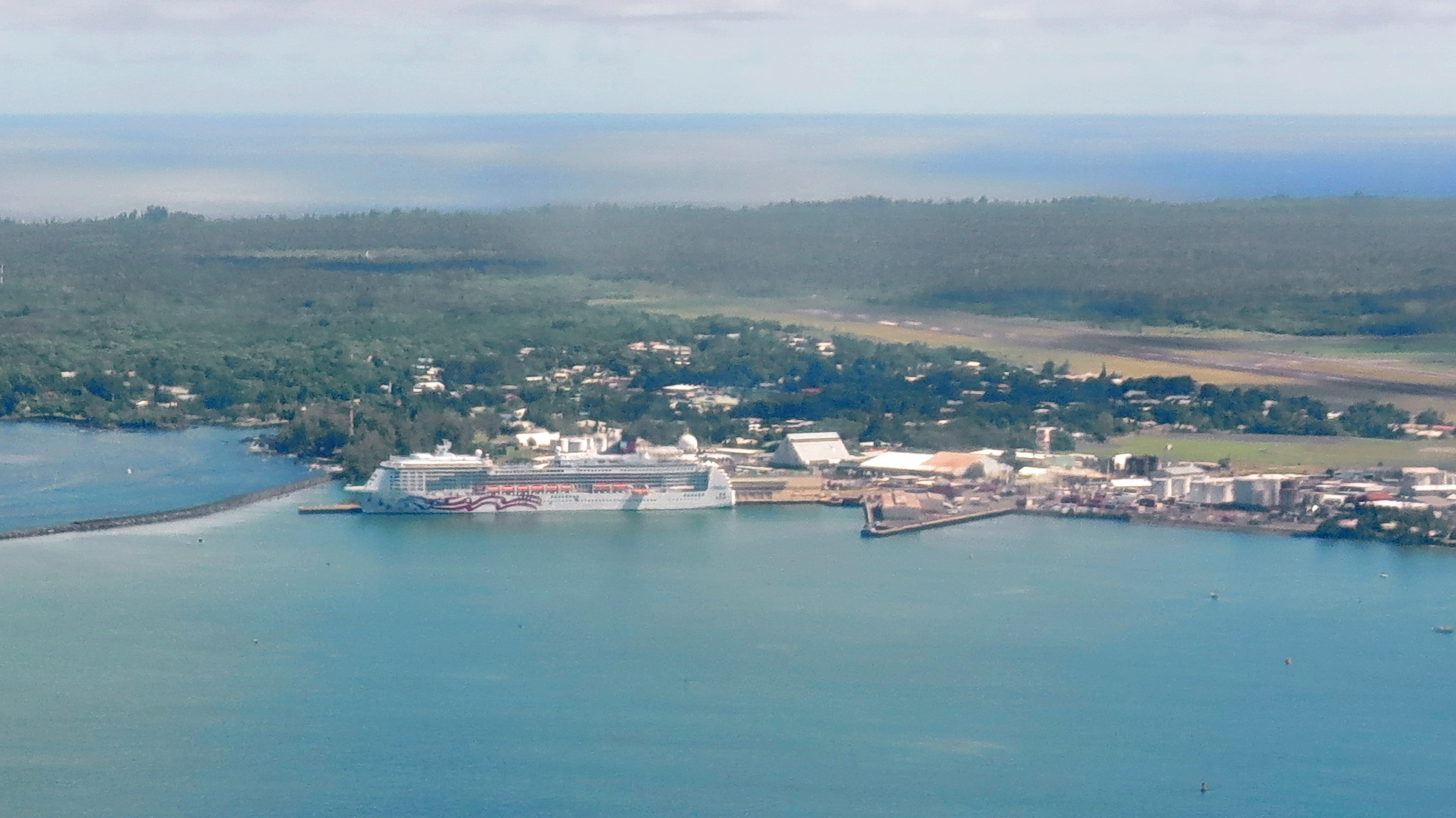
Pride of America docked at Hilo Harbor; Hilo International Airport runway is visible in the background

=== Air ===
Hilo is served by Hilo International Airport (ITO), where Hawaiian Airlines, Southwest Airlines and Mokulele Airlines, among various helicopter tour groups.

=== Rail ===
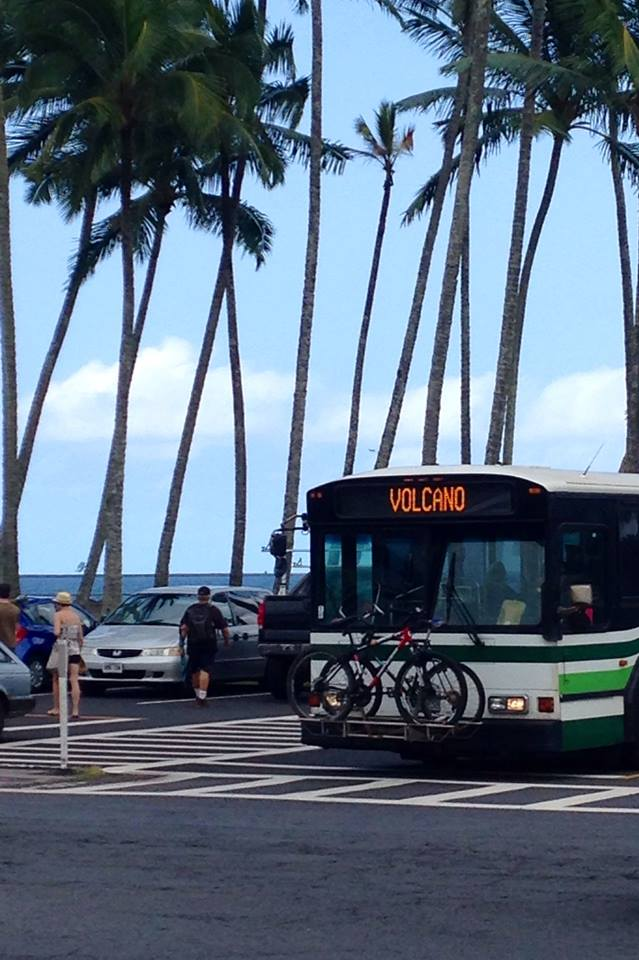
Hele-On bus in Hilo

Hilo was served by the Hawaii Consolidated Railway from 1899 until 1946. The railway ran northbound to Paʻauilo and southbound to Pāhoa, Glenwood (near Volcano), and Kamaili.

=== Bus ===
Hilo is served by the county's Hele-On Bus.

=== Major highways ===
- Route 11
- Route 19
- Route 200
- Route 2000

=== Maritime ===
Hilo is served by the Big Island's largest harbor, Hilo Harbor, which is on Hilo Bay.

== Education ==
Hilo is home to a number of educational institutions, including two post-secondary institutions, the University of Hawaiʻi at Hilo and Hawaiʻi Community College, and the Hilo and Waiakea primary and secondary school districts. Charter schools in the area serve primary and secondary students.

== Government ==
Although sometimes called a city, Hilo is not an incorporated city, and does not have a municipal government. The entire island, which is between the slightly larger state of Connecticut and smaller Rhode Island in size, is under the jurisdiction of the County of Hawaiʻi, of which Hilo is the county seat. Hilo is home to county, state, and federal offices.

== Economy ==
Parks and attractions near Hilo Bay and downtown Hilo, Hawaii
- Points of interest
- Parks and open spaces
- Transportation
1 Lyman House Memorial Museum
2 Haili Church
3 Kalākaua Park / East Hawaii Cultural Center
4 Pacific Tsunami Museum
5 Moʻoheau County Park (Hele-On Bus Terminal) / S. Hata Building / Mokupāpapa Discovery Center
6 Russell Carroll Soccer Fields
7 Aupuni Center / County of Hawaiʻi offices
8 Hilo Bayfront Beach Park
9 Wailoa River State Recreation Area / Waiākea Pond
10 Coconut Island / Moku Ola
11 Queen Liliʻuokalani Park and Gardens / Banyan Drive
12 Grand Naniloa Hotel / Naniloa Golf Course
13 Reed's Bay Beach Park
14 Hoʻolulu Complex (Merrie Monarch Festival site): Afook-Chinen Civic Auditorium · Aunty Sally Kaleohano's Luʻau Hale · Edith Kanakaʻole Stadium · 'Sparky' Kawamoto Swim Stadium · Walter Victor Baseball Complex · Francis Wong Stadium
15 Hilo Harbor
16 Hilo International Airport

The oldest city in the Hawaiian archipelago, Hilo's economy was historically based on the sugar plantations of its surrounding areas, prior to their closure in the 1990s.

=== Tourism and events ===
While Hilo has a fairly significant tourism sector, it gets less than half the annual visitors as the western coast of the Big Island, which has much sunnier weather and significantly less rain, with sandy and swimmable beaches and numerous major resorts.

A main source of tourism in Hilo is the annual week-long Merrie Monarch Festival, the world's preeminent hula competition and festival, which brings in visitors and participants from all over the world. It is held in the spring of each year beginning on Easter Sunday.

Hilo is often the air travel destination and accommodation location of choice from which to visit Hawaiʻi Volcanoes National Park and also, when active, the lava flows from Kīlauea volcano, since both are on the east side (often called "Hilo side") of Hawaiʻi island, whereas the other airport on the island, Kona International Airport, is on the west side ("Kona side") of the island, at least 1.5 hour's drive away.

The local orchid society hosts the largest and most comprehensive orchid show in the state, the annual Hilo Orchid Show, which has been presented since 1951 and draws visitors and entrants worldwide.

Hilo is home to Hawaii's only tsunami museum, mostly dedicated to the 1946 Pacific tsunami, and is notable for the banyan trees planted by Babe Ruth, Amelia Earhart and other celebrities. It is home to the Panaʻewa Rainforest Zoo, shopping centers, cafés and other eateries, movie theaters, hotels, restaurants, and a developed downtown area with a Farmers Market. Downtown Hilo is bounded approximately by the Wailuku River, Kamehameha Avenue, Ponahawai Street, and Kapiolani Street.

=== Corporations and science ===
The Mauna Loa Macadamia Nut Corporation is in Hilo, south of the main town off Hawaiʻi Belt Road, north of Keaʻau.

Hilo is home to most of the astronomical observatories on Mauna Kea as well as the ʻImiloa Planetarium and Museum. Astronomy has an economic impact of $100 million annually on the island. Astronomy on Mauna Kea was developed at the invitation of the Hawaiʻi Chamber of Commerce following the collapse of the sugarcane industry.

== Culture ==
- East Hawaiʻi Cultural Center
- Lyman House Memorial Museum
- Merrie Monarch Festival
- Pacific Tsunami Museum

== Notable people ==
- Rodney Anoaʻi
- Matt Blair
- Keiko Bonk
- Wright Elemakule Bowman Sr.
- Ed Case
- Titus Coan
- Keenan Cornelius
- Glenn Cornick
- Kai Correa
- Wesley Correira
- Jennifer Doudna
- David McHattie Forbes
- Ryan Higa
- Michael Rikio Ming Hee Ho
- High Chiefess Kapiʻolani
- Keōua Kūʻahuʻula
- Harry Kim
- Kimberly Kim
- Darren Kimura
- Kinoʻoleoliliha
- Robert Kiyosaki
- George Lycurgus
- Troy Mandaloniz
- George Naʻope
- Gerald Okamura
- B.J. Penn
- Benjamin Pitman
- Bob Shane
- William Herbert Shipman
- Gil C. Silva
- Lani Stemmermann
- Sarah Coan Waters
- Kean Wong
- Kolten Wong
- Henry Bianchini

== Points of interest ==
- Banyan Drive
- Coconut Island
- East Hawaii Cultural Center
- Haili Church
- Hawaii Tropical Botanical Garden
- Hilo Tropical Gardens
- Hoʻolulu Park
- ʻImiloa Astronomy Center
- James Kealoha Beach Park
- Kalakaua Park
- Liliʻuokalani Park and Gardens
- Lower Waiakea Mountain Bicycle Park
- Lyman Museum
- Mauna Loa Macadamia Nut Corporation
- Mokupāpapa Discovery Center for Northwestern Hawaii's remote coral reefs
- Nani Mau Gardens
- Naha Stone (associated with Kamehameha I) in front of the Hilo Public Library
- Pacific Tsunami Museum
- Pana'ewa Rainforest Zoo
- Prince Kuhio Plaza
- Rainbow Falls (Waianuenue) & Boiling Pots on the Wailuku River
- University of Hawaiʻi at Hilo Botanical Gardens
- Wailoa River State Recreation Area with King Kamehameha Statue

== Media ==
Hilo is served by KWXX (94.7FM Hilo/101.5FM Kona), B93/B97 (93.1FM Kona/97.1FM Hilo), The Wave (KHBC 92.7FM Hilo), and KPUA (970AM Hilo) radio stations.

Public Access television is provided through Nā Leo TV.

The Hawaii Tribune-Herald, of Oahu Publications Inc., a subsidiary of Black Press, is Hilo's primary newspaper distribution company along with other newspapers like the Honolulu Star-Advertiser.

== Sister cities ==
Since Hilo is not incorporated, its sister cities are congruent with those of the County of Hawaiʻi.

== Legacy ==
Asteroid (342431) Hilo is named after Hilo.

== Hilo Districts ==
(3) North Hilo and (2) South Hilo Districts are located in the east coast of Hawaii County (the Big Island). They are bordered by Hamakua District (4) in the north, and by Kau District (9) in the south and Puna District (1) in the southeast. The far inland areas are largely unpopulated, being forest reserves on the slopes of Mauna Kea and Mauna Loa.

Hilo also referred to the District of Hilo when the Big Island was divided into six districts by the traditional moku land division. Hilo is now divided in two: North and South Hilo Districts.

=== North Hilo District ===
The District of North Hilo, along Hawaiʻi Belt Road from north to south, encompasses the following unincorporated towns and localities:

- ʻŌʻōkala
- Laupāhoehoe and the train museum
- Nīnole

There are locations inland along Route 200 including Mauna Kea mountain road, Puʻu Huluhulu, and others.

=== South Hilo District ===
Along the portion of Hawaiʻi Belt Road north of Hilo lies the following:

- Honalo
- ʻAkaka Falls
- Pepeʻekeo
- Wainaku

Along Hawaiʻi Belt Road inside and south of Hilo are:

- Hilo Bay
- Wailuku River
- Rainbow Falls and Boiling Pots waterfalls
- Pacific Tsunami Museum
- Hilo International Airport
- Prince Kuhio Plaza Shopping Center
- Panaʻewa Rainforest Zoo
- Puainako Shopping Center

Along Route 200 inside and west of Hilo are:

- Kaumana Caves
- University of Hawaiʻi at Hilo

== In popular culture ==
Jasmin Iolani Hakes' 2023 book Hula: A Novel, which won Honolulu magazine's award for Book of the Year About Hawaiʻi, is set in Hilo.
