= Panaʻewa Rainforest Zoo =

Zoo in Hawai'i, U.S.

Panaʻewa Rainforest Zoo & Gardens
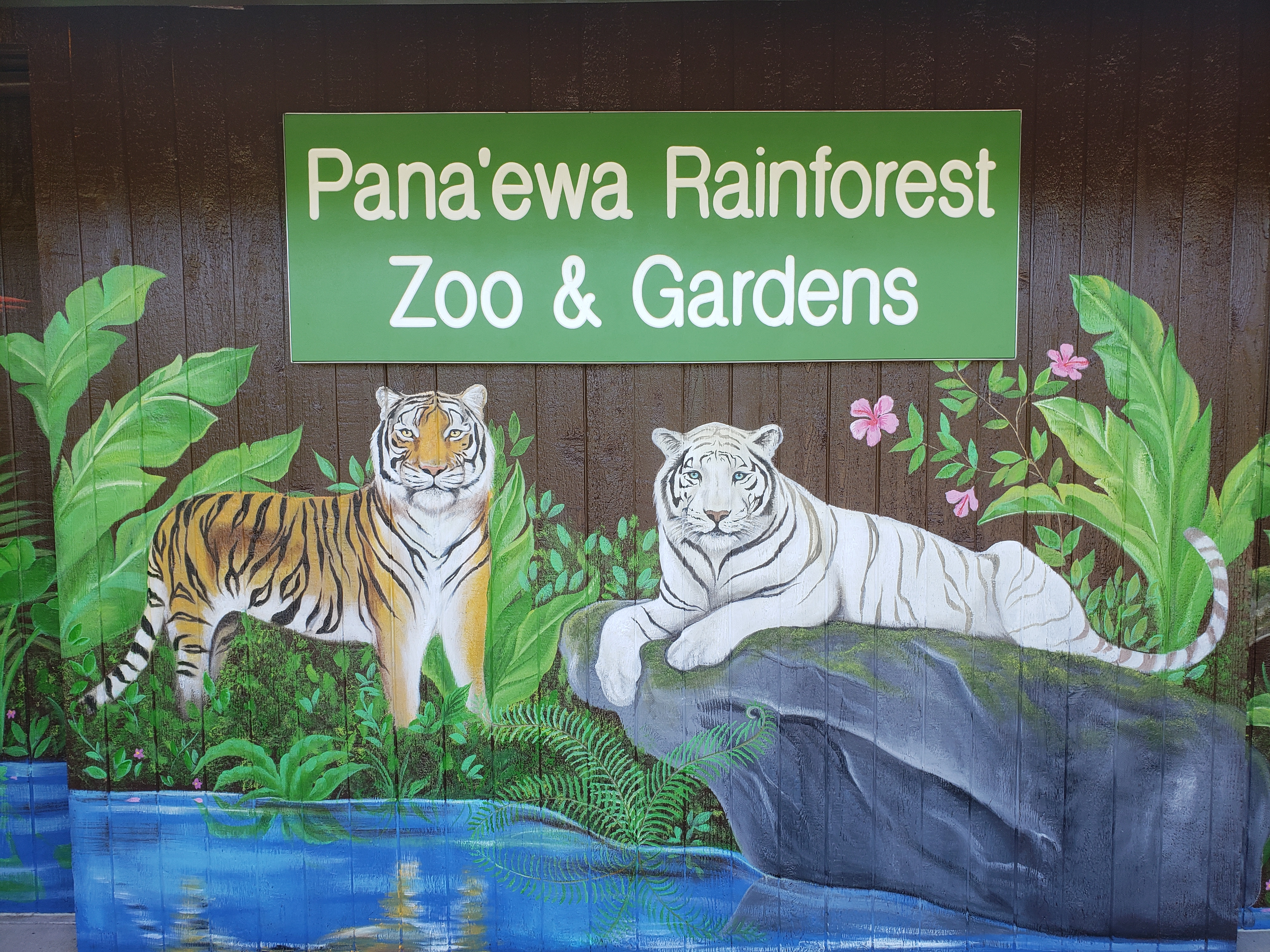
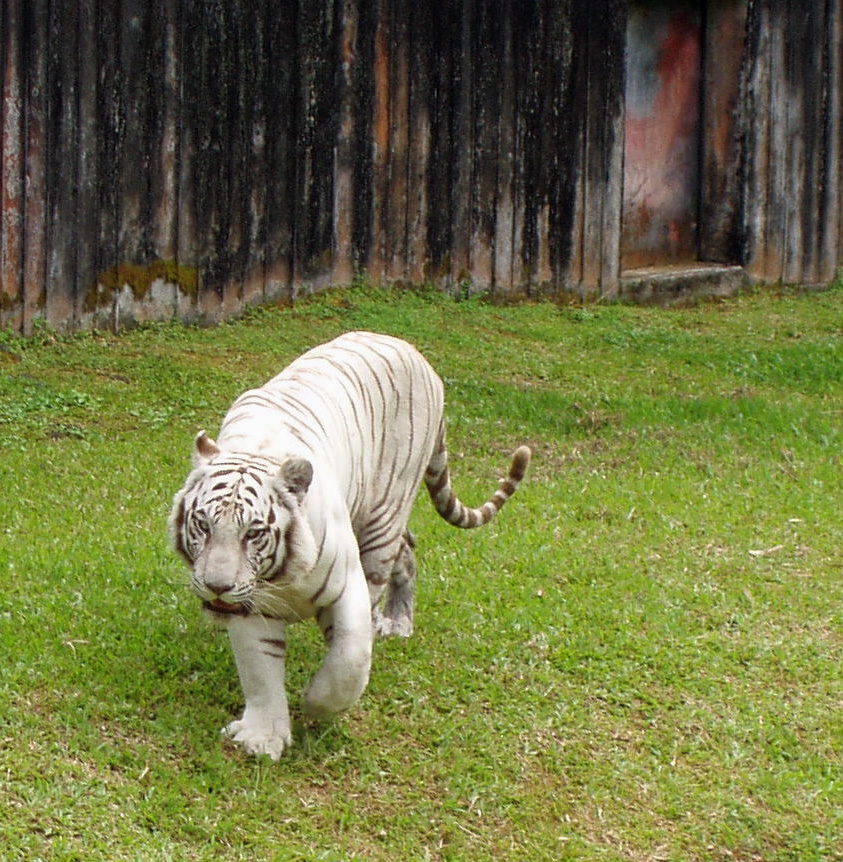
- Sign at entrance to the zoo. White Bengal tiger at the zoo.
- Interactive map of Panaʻewa Rainforest Zoo & Gardens
- 19.6552°N 155.0748°W
- Date opened: September 1978
- Location: Hilo, Hawaiʻi, United States
- Land area: 12 acres
- No. of species: 80
- Website: www.hilozoo.org

Panaʻewa Rainforest Zoo is located in Hilo, Hawaiʻi, United States. This small 12-acre (4.9 ha) zoo is the only one in the United States located in a rainforest. It is operated by Hawaii County and receives its funding from the county and from private donations.

The zoo has more than 80 species of animals on display, and the grounds feature more than 40 different species of plants, flowers, and trees.

The most popular attraction of the zoo was a male white Bengal tiger named Namaste' (named after the traditional namaste greeting). Bengal tigers come from India and have been hunted to the brink of extinction, with fewer than 2000 live in the wild. White tigers have not been seen in the wild in over five decades, and the current captive population descend from a number of inbred individuals. Namaste' was born in Las Vegas on September 30, 1998, and arrived in Hilo on April 16, 1999. The zoo had planned to purchase Namaste' from Dirk Arthur, a magician at the Tropicana Resort & Casino in Las Vegas, but when Arthur saw the zoo's 1-acre (4,000 m^{2}) tiger enclosure, he donated Namaste' to the zoo. Namaste died on January 16, 2014, at the age of 15. In March, 2016 Great Cats World Park in Oregon donated two Bengal Tiger cubs, one orange female (Sriracha) and one white male (Tzatziki).

== History ==
Hilo's first zoo was opened in February 1969 at the entrance to Onekahakaha Beach Park and operated by the Department of Parks & Recreation. This 1-acre site was considered temporary due to the lack of space for expansion, location in a tsunami inundation zone, and the potential for water contamination on the coast.

In 1978, the construction of the zoo's permanent location was completed in the Panaewa Recreational Complex. The zoo opened in September of that year under the Name Pana'ewa Rainforest Zoo.

Through the help of numerous botanical organizations, the zoo transformed much of its spaces into a beautiful botanical garden. In September 2006, the Hawaii County Council passed an ordinance to rename the zoo Pana'ewa Rainforest Zoo & Gardens.

Pana'ewa went through a major renovation in 2020-2021 during the COVID 19 shutdown. The remodel saw improvements to animal enclosures, walking paths, and support structures. The main entrance was completely rebuilt with restrooms and gift shop.

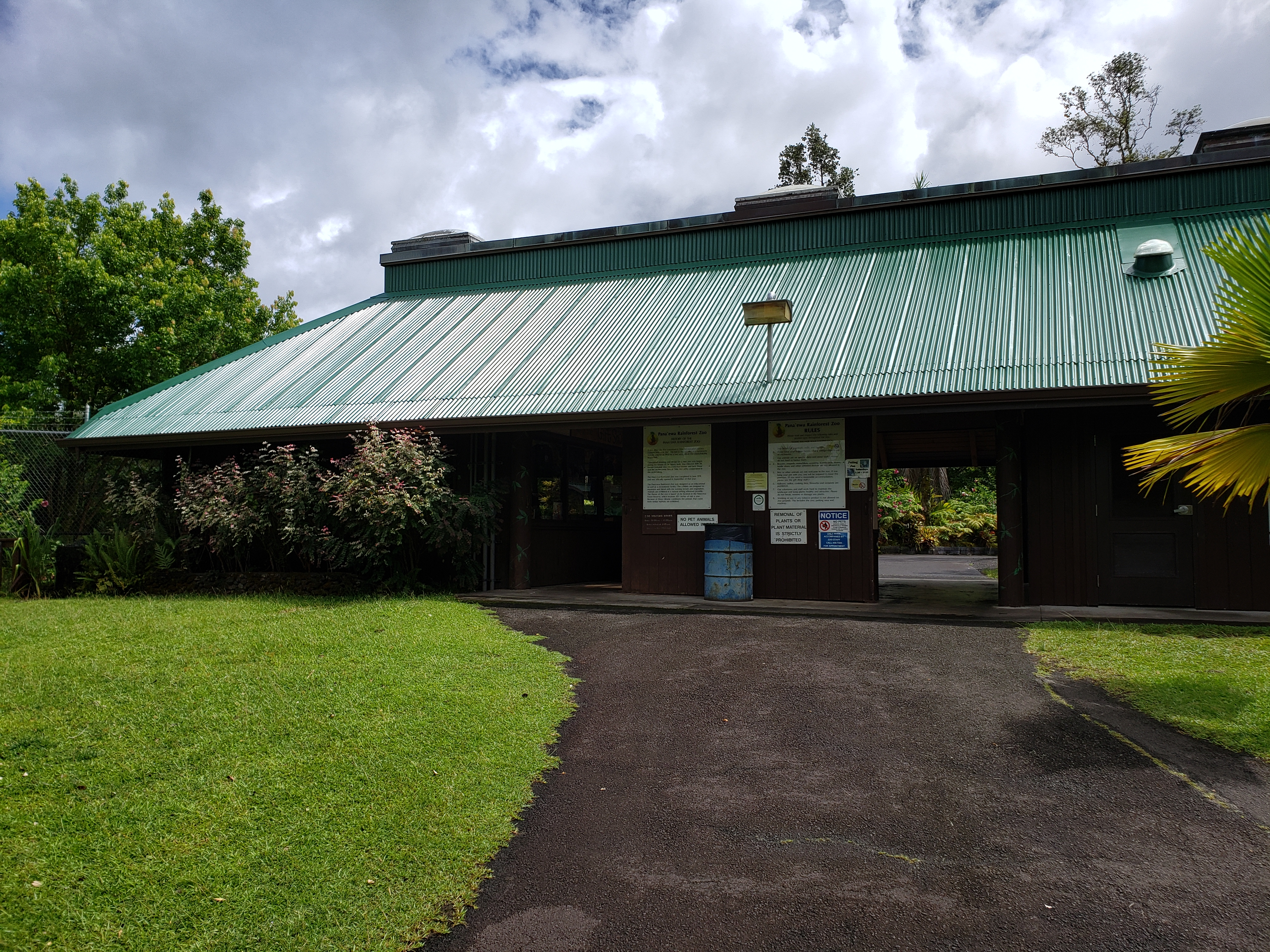
Pana'ewa Zoo entrance (September 2019) before 2020 remodel.

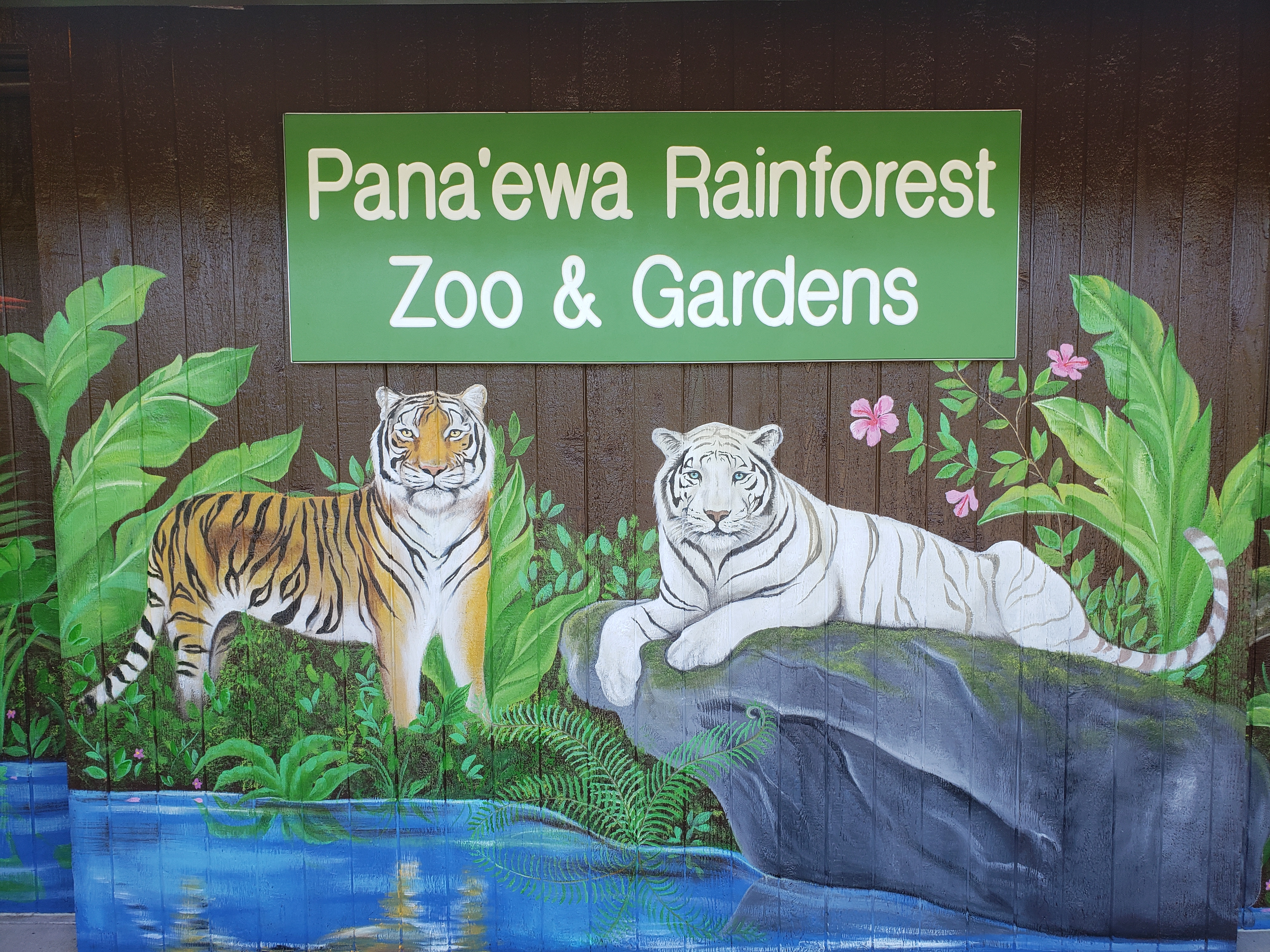
Pana'ewa Rainforest Zoo & Gardens entrance sign

== Areas and attractions ==
=== Petting Zoo ===
Pana'ewa has a small petting zoo located near the main pavilion and playground. The petting zoo is operated by the Friends of the Pana’ewa Zoo with the help of volunteers. As of 10/3/2022, the petting zoo is open every Saturday from 1:30 PM to 2:30 PM.

The petting zoo allows brief interactions with various animals such as rabbits, chickens, guinea pig, ponies, tortoise, and goats.

=== Amphibians ===
Red-eyed tree frog

Blue poison arrow frog (Dendrobates tinctorius "azureus")

Green and black poison dart frog (Dendrobates auratus)

Tomato Frog

Yellow-banded poison dart frog (Dendrobates leucomelas)

=== Birds ===
Hawaiian Crow ‘Alalā (Corvus hawaiiensis)

Amazon parrot

Blue-and-yellow macaw (Ara ararauna)

Grey crowned crane (Balearica regulorum)

Hyacinth macaw (Anodorhynchus hyacinthinus)

ʻio (Buteo solitarius)

Nene (Branta sandvicensis)

Pueo (Asio flammeus sandwichensis)

=== Mammals ===
Bengal tiger

Capuchin monkey

Feral pig

Nigerian dwarf goat

White Bengal tiger

=== Reptiles ===
Aldabra giant tortoise (Aldabrachelys gigantea)

American alligator (Alligator mississippiensis)

Boa constrictor

Green Iguana (Iguana iguana)

Red Iguana
