= Hāmākua =

District on the northeast coast of Hawaiʻi's Big Island

Districts of Hawaiʻi island: from northernmost, clockwise; North Kohala, Hāmākua (highlighted), North Hilo, South Hilo, Puna, Kaʻū, South Kona, North Kona, and South Kohala

Hāmākua is a district on the northeast coast of Hawaiʻi's Big Island, administered by the County of Hawaiʻi in the state of Hawaiʻi. It is also the name given for the coastline in the region, the "Hāmākua Coast".

== Description ==
Hāmākua's coast is approximately 50 miles (80 km) long, along the Pacific Ocean around 19°59′36″N 155°14′25″W, ending at Waipiʻo Valley and the uninhabited Waimanu Valley. The term Hāmākua Coast is used loosely to describe the region between Hilo and Waipiʻo, although the modern Hāmākua zoning district begins north of Laupāhoehoe and west of ʻŌʻōkala. The rainfall due to the prevailing northeasterly tropical trade winds produces steep erosional valleys and cliffs, showing evidence of frequent landslides. The lush vegetation and lack of sandy beaches contrasts sharply with other regions of the island.

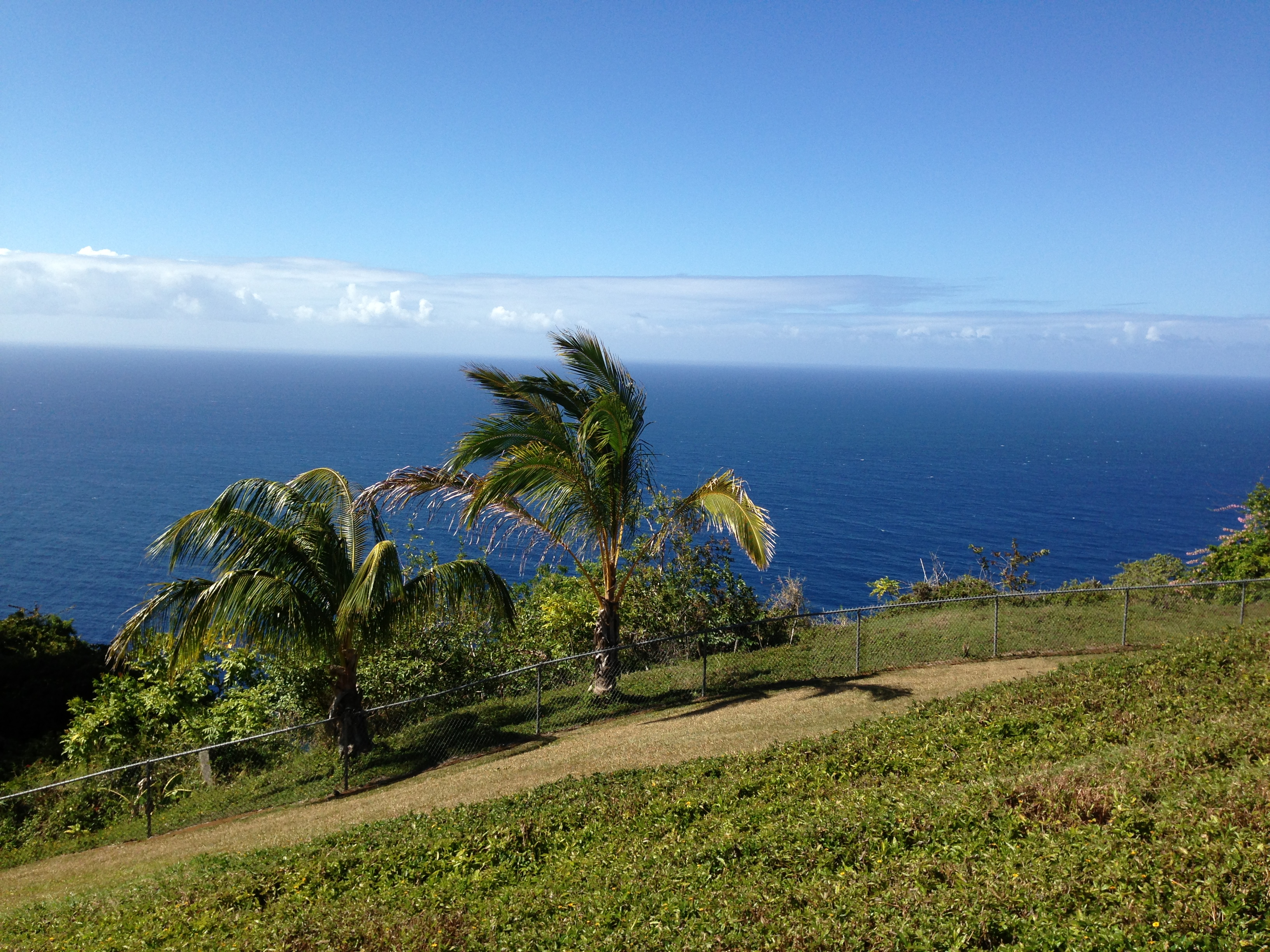
Hamakua Coast north of Honoka'a town.

The dominating geographic feature in Hāmākua is the volcanic mountain Mauna Kea. The district stretches south through the central plateau to the summit of Mauna Loa. Hāmākua was one of the six traditional districts of the island in ancient Hawaii (known as moku). To the north beyond Waipiʻo Valley is the Kohala district, with the older volcano Kohala mountain. According to Hui Mālama i ke Ala ʻŪlili, Hāmākua is known for its "steep mountain trails."

== History ==
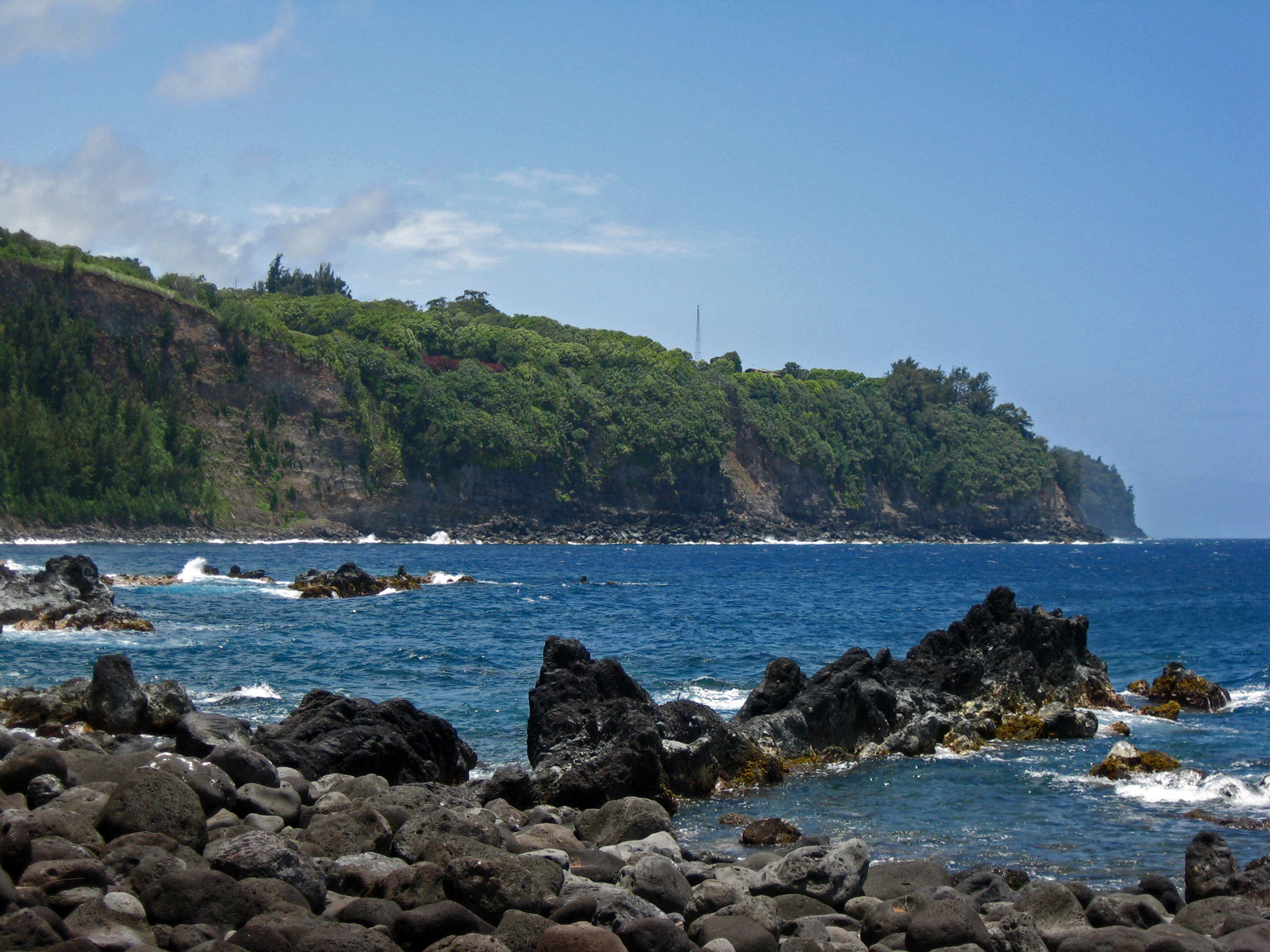
Cliffs on the Hāmākua Coast

In Hawaiian mythology, Mauna Kea was the home of snow goddess Poliʻahu, and the place of several other legends.

John Palmer Parker established the Parker Ranch on the high grasslands of Mauna Kea in 1847. Over the years (especially under manager Alfred Wellington Carter) it was expanded to encompass much of the mountain's slopes.

Many small communities sprang up around sugarcane plantations which were operating along the Hāmākua Coast through most of the 20th century. The demand for sugar cane rose after the Reciprocity Treaty of 1875 reduced tariffs to the United States. The first mill processed the crop planted in 1876. Early investors included Claus Spreckels, Samuel Parker, and Theophilus Harris Davies. The Hāmākua Mill Company, Honokaʻa Sugar, Kaiwiki Sugar, Kukaiau Plantation Company, Laupāhoehoe Sugar, Paʻauhau Sugar Plantation and Pacific Sugar Mill were eventually consolidated into the Hāmākua Sugar Company.

The Hāmākua district was an endemic region of bubonic plague in the early part of the 20th century. From 1910 to 1949, there were 112 confirmed cases of the disease, of which 109 were fatal. The Board of Health of the Territory of Hawaii, in combined efforts with the local sugar plantations, engaged in a vast rat extermination campaign. Despite these efforts, plague remained an enzootic disease in the region up until 1957. It is unclear why plague eventually left the area.

Sugar plantations declined and were consolidated in the latter half of the 20th century. About 10% of the population was lost each decade following 1970. The company was sold by Theo H. Davies & Co. to Francis S. Morgan in 1984 who operated the property for ten years. The Hamakua Sugar Company had its final harvest in 1994. After years of high unemployment, the economy shifted to small diversified farms. Crops include macadamia nuts, papaya, mango, coffee, and other tropical fruits. Irrigation canals known as the Upper Hamakua Ditch and Lower Hamakua Ditch (not to be confused with the project of a similar name on Maui by Henry Perrine Baldwin) had been built in 1910, and were repaired in 2001.

While virtually all of the pre-existing native forest below altitudes of several thousand feet was removed by sugarcane cultivation, several remnants of native forest can be found. Where the terrain of gulches such as Laupāhoehoe, Ka'awali'i, and Maulua was too steep for cultivation, for example, the original forest remains largely intact. There are also protected areas such as Kalōpā State Recreation Area, which has preserved a small stand of native trees and their understory compatriots. Other protected areas include the Hamakua, Hauola, Manowaialee, and Mauna Kea State Forest Reserves, Hakalau Forest National Wildlife Refuge, and Mauna Kea Ice Age Reserve, all on Mauna Kea, and the Mauna Loa Forest Preserve on Mauna Loa.

In 2009 the Mauna Kea Observatory was selected as the site of a new Thirty Meter Telescope. Although the project encountered some local opposition, other members of the community welcomed the diversification of the economy. A comprehensive management plan was produced with local input.

== Transportation ==
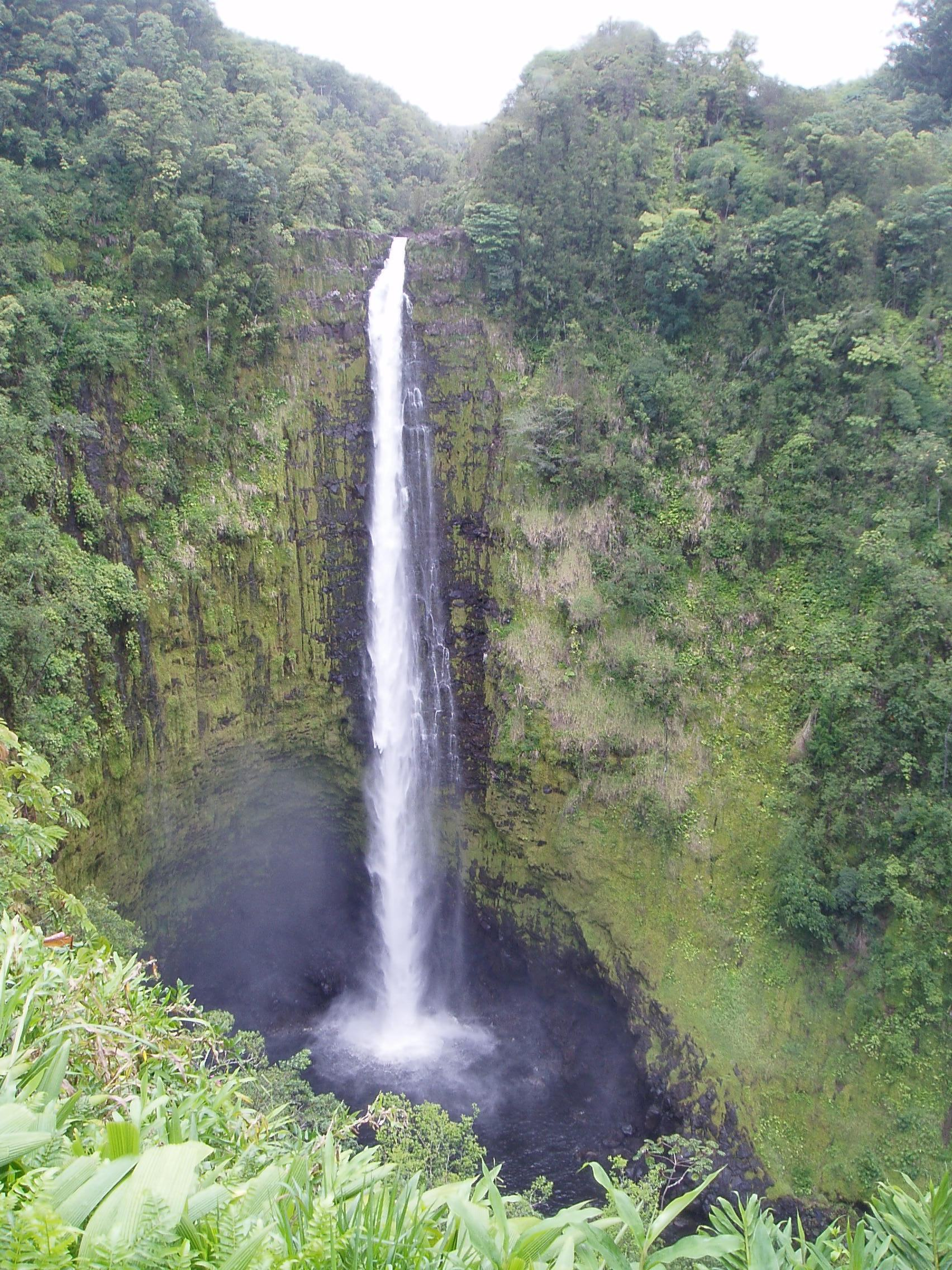
Akaka Falls

The Hawaii Consolidated Railway was extended to connect the Hāmākua sugarcane plantations to the harbor at Hilo Bay. On April 1, 1946, a tsunami caused by an Aleutian Islands earthquake damaged the railroad so much it abandoned its tracks. Several years later the state of Hawaii acquired the right-of-way, and by 1960 realigned the Hawaii Belt Road (Route 19, known as the Māmalahoa Highway) to shorten the driving time. In many places the older highway (Old Māmalahoa Highway) follows a more scenic, but twisted route that resembles the more well-known Road to Hana on Maui.

Popular recreation sites along the Māmalahoa Highway include Akaka Falls, Umauma Falls, Hawaii Tropical Botanical Garden, World Botanical Gardens and Kolekole Beach Park.

The Saddle Road (Route 200) travels from Hilo through the inland part of the district, providing access to the high plateau between Mauna Loa and Mauna Kea, and roads to the astronomical observatories on the summit of Mauna Kea] and the NOAA observatory high on Mauna Loa. The US military conducts live-fire training at the Pohakuloa Training Area along this road.

== Communities ==
Although there are no separately incorporated cities in the state of Hawaii, communities in the district include:

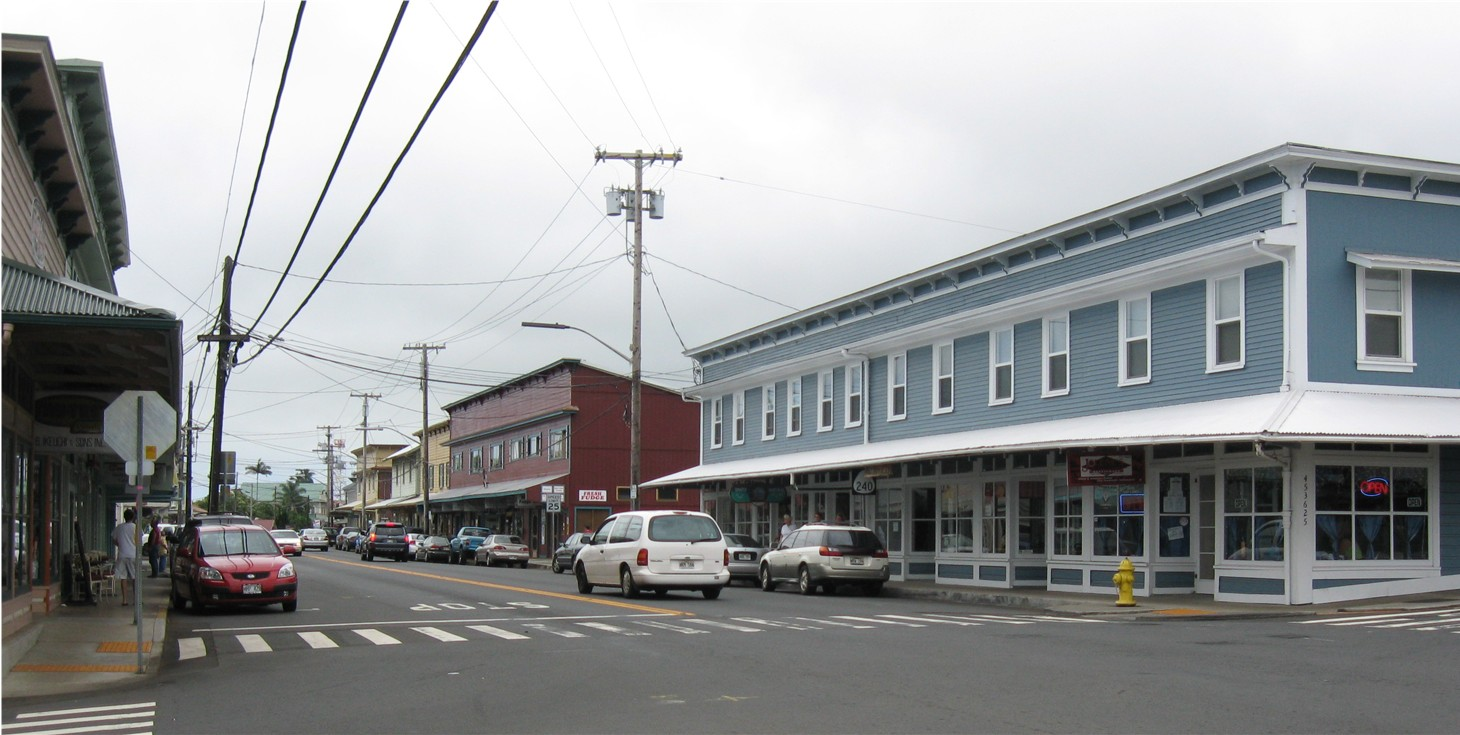
Main street of Honokaʻa

- Āhualoa
- Honokaʻa
- Kukuihaele
- Paʻauilo
- Pāpaʻaloa

== Notable residents ==
- David McHattie Forbes (1863–1937), Scottish sugar planter
- Edward Griffin Hitchcock (1837–1898), sugar planter, sheriff, and marshal
- Rufus Anderson Lyman (1842–1910), founded Paʻauhau Sugar Plantation
- Pablo Manlapit (1891–1969), labor organizer
- William Herbert Purvis (1858–1950), English planter introduced Macadamia
- Erik Hazelhoff Roelfzema (1917–2007), Dutch spy and author
- Dwight Takamine (born January 29, 1953), state senator
- Georges Phillipe Trousseau (1833–1894) French royal physician in the Kingdom of Hawaii
- John D. Waihee III (born May 19, 1946), first native Hawaiian governor
- Roseanne Barr (born November 3, 1952), is an American actress, comedian, writer, television producer and director.
