= Hawaii Consolidated Railway =

Defunct railroad on Hawaiʻi Island

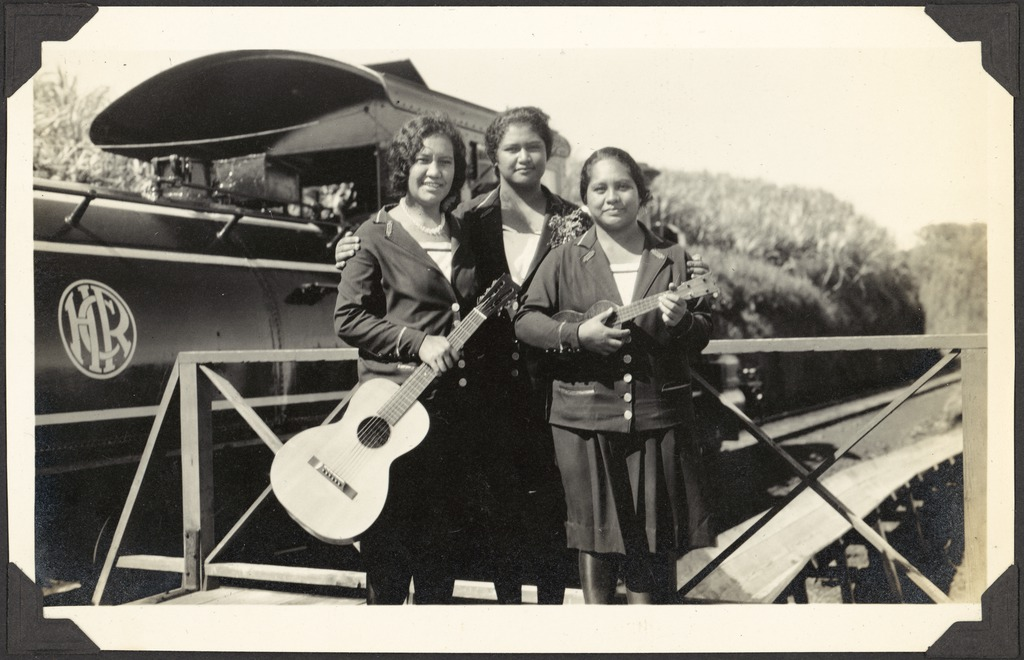
- Musicians with Hawaii Consolidated Railway steam locomotive (1929), by C.M. Yonge

Overview
- Headquarters: Hilo, Hawaii
- Locale: Hilo and vicinity on the island of Hawaiʻi
- Dates of operation: 1899–1946

Technical
- Track gauge: 4 ft 8 1/2 in (1,435 mm) standard gauge

The Hawaii Consolidated Railway (HCR), originally named the Hilo Railroad Company, was a standard gauge common carrier railroad that served much of the east coast of the island of Hawaiʻi (The Big Island) from 1899 until 1946, when a tsunami destroyed part of the line.

== History ==
=== Origin ===
Like the Oahu Railway and Land Company (OR&L), the HCR grew out of a necessity for good transportation (in this case, mainly to serve sugarcane plantations) at the turn of the 20th century. Though not the first railroad on the Big Island, it was certainly the most ambitious. Its principal backer was Benjamin Dillingham, the businessman who also started the OR&L, among numerous other Hawaiian companies. In the late 1890s Dillingham acquired approximately 35,000 acres (14,000 ha) of land through purchases and leases worth $5 million, southeast of the growing city of Hilo in present day Keaʻau and Puna, which would become his Olaʻa Sugar Company and Puna Sugar Company plantations. The Olaʻa and Puna Sugar plantation mills were approximately 9 and 27 mi (14 and 43 km) from Hilo Harbor, respectively.

Sanborn Fire Insurance maps of Hilo area, 1914

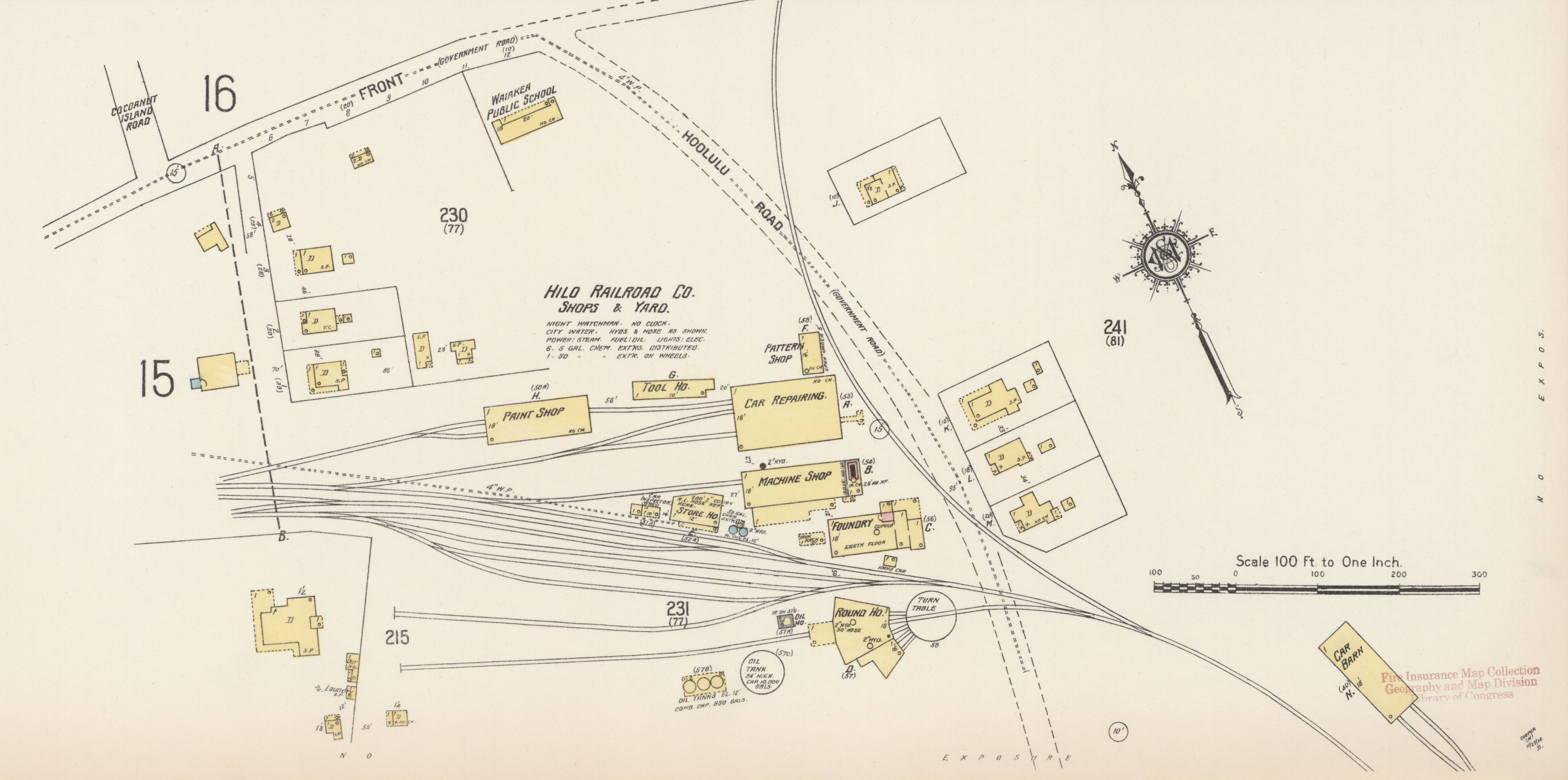
Waiākea, showing Hilo Railroad Company railyard and shops; note roundhouse, center bottom

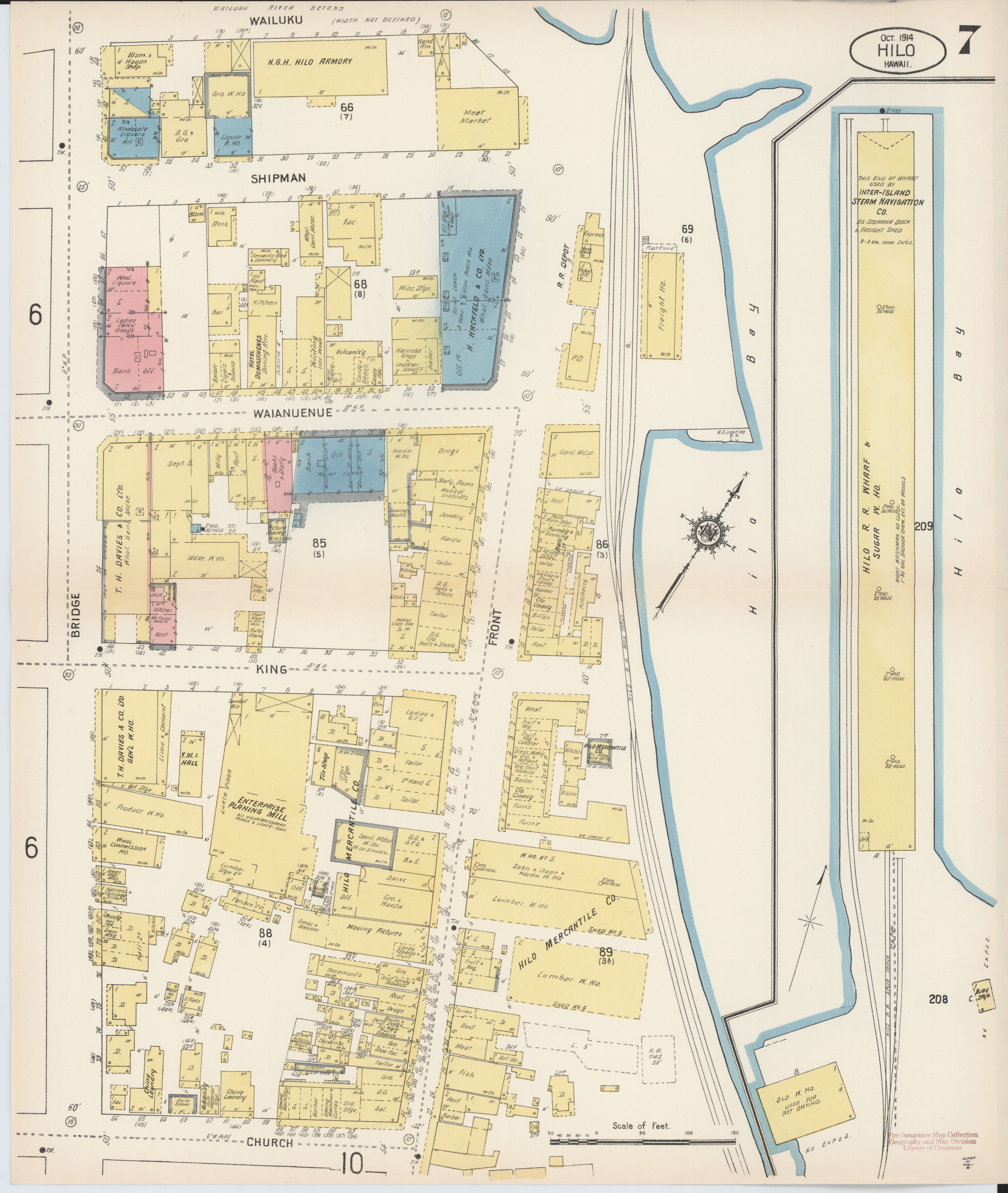
Hilo Bay front: downtown station at foot of Waianuenue. Inset: HRC wharf at Hilo Harbor.

Dillingham incorporated the Hilo Railroad Company (HRC) with his partners Lorrin A. Thurston, Alfred Wellington Carter, and Mark P. Robinson; HRC received a charter on March 28, 1899 to build the original 8 mi (13 km) of the Hilo Railroad that connected the Olaʻa sugar mill to Waiākea, soon to become the location of Hilo's deepwater port. Under the terms of the charter, HRC was granted the right to build rail lines anywhere on the island over the next fifty years, and HRC was free to use any government land to do so. The line to Olaʻa Sugar was laid with 60-pound rail using standard-gauge railway.

Hilo Railroad Company Time Table (July 1, 1905)
Volcano Service									Puna Service				
To Glenwood				Station	To Hilo				To Puna		Station	To Hilo	
Mon-Sat		Sun		Station	Mon-Sat		Sun		Fri	Sun	Station	Fri	Sun
#7 (AM)	#9 (PM)	#1 (AM)	#3 (PM)	Station	#8 (AM)	#10 (PM)	#2 (AM)	#4 (PM)	#13 (AM)	#5 (AM)	Station	#14 (AM)	#6 (PM)
7:00	2:30	8:00	2:30	Hilo	9:40	5:45	10:48	5:15	6:00	9:00	Hilo	9:55	4:40
									—	—	Hilo Wharf	9:50	—
7:05	2:35	8:06	2:36	Waiakea	9:35	5:40	10:44	5:11	6:06	9:06	Waiakea	9:30	4:35
7:22	2:53	8:25	2:55	Olaa Mill	9:20	5:25	10:28	4:56	6:28	9:25	Olaa Mill	9:10	4:15
7:30	3:15	8:32	3:02	Keaau	9:15	5:15	10:22	4:50	6:58	9:50	Pahoa Jct	8:42	3:47
7:46	3:30	8:49	3:19	Ferndale	9:00	4:55	10:06	4:35	—	10:20	Pahoa	8:30	3:35
8:00	3:30	9:05	3:35	Mtn View	8:50	4:45	9:55	4:25	7:20	10:55	Puna	7:35	3:00
8:20	4:15	9:25	3:55	Glenwood	8:30	4:25	9:35	4:05					

After rail service on the Olaʻa line began on June 18, 1900, work continued apace with a 17 mi (27 km) extension to Kapoho, home of the Puna Sugar Company plantation, completed by March 1902. Immediately after that two branch lines were constructed, also to sugar plantations, and then the railroad was extended north into Hilo itself. A chiefly tourist line, branching from Olaʻa, was built in 1901, routed inland 12.5 mi (20.1 km) up the mountain to Glenwood where visitors would then transfer to buses for the remaining 9 mi (14 km) trip to the Volcano House near Kilauea Volcano.

=== Hāmākua Division and receivership ===
At this point the Hilo Railroad's southern section was fairly complete, and with strong sugar-related traffic the company was financially healthy. However, the company's fortunes would change drastically when Dillingham and other company owners in 1907 petitioned the US Congress and Territory of Hawaii to build a breakwater and improve Hilo Bay's harbor; at the time, the harbor was not well-protected from seasonal storms and heavy seas. In exchange for those projects, HRC would extend its line north-northwest from Hilo up the rugged Hāmākua coast to service the northern sugarcane plantations.

The new Hāmākua Division, planned from Hilo to Paʻaulio, was funded through the initial issue of bonds, which were authorized not to exceed US$2,000,000 (equivalent to $69,110,000 in 2025) in 1907, later supplemented by another issue of US$800,000 (equivalent to $28,670,000 in 2025) for the extension in 1909. In 1910, while the Hāmākua Division was still being built, the HRC system was the only standard gauge railway in the territory of Hawaiʻi and the second-longest overall, with 46 1/4 mi (74.4 km) of track counted in its main line and branches.

The 33.5 miles (53.9 km) Hāmākua Division was an engineering marvel, including the construction of 3 tunnels and 35 large trestle bridges (22 wooden and 13 steel) across the mouths of valleys. The total length of bridges was 12,000 feet (3,700 m), with individual bridges up to 1,006 ft (307 m) in length and 230 ft (70 m) high. 3,200 ft (980 m) of tunnels were built. However, it also was one of the most expensive railroad construction projects per mile in the world at that time, at US$106,000 (equivalent to $3,540,000 in 2025) per mile, totaling $3.5 million (equivalent to $117 million adjusted for inflation), comparable to the cost and timing of the Bayshore Cutoff, which was built by the much larger Southern Pacific Railroad just south of San Francisco. The tremendous expense forced the company into receivership by 1914, and by 1916 it was sold in foreclosure proceedings. The company was reorganized as the Hawaii Consolidated Railway (HCR) in February 1916.

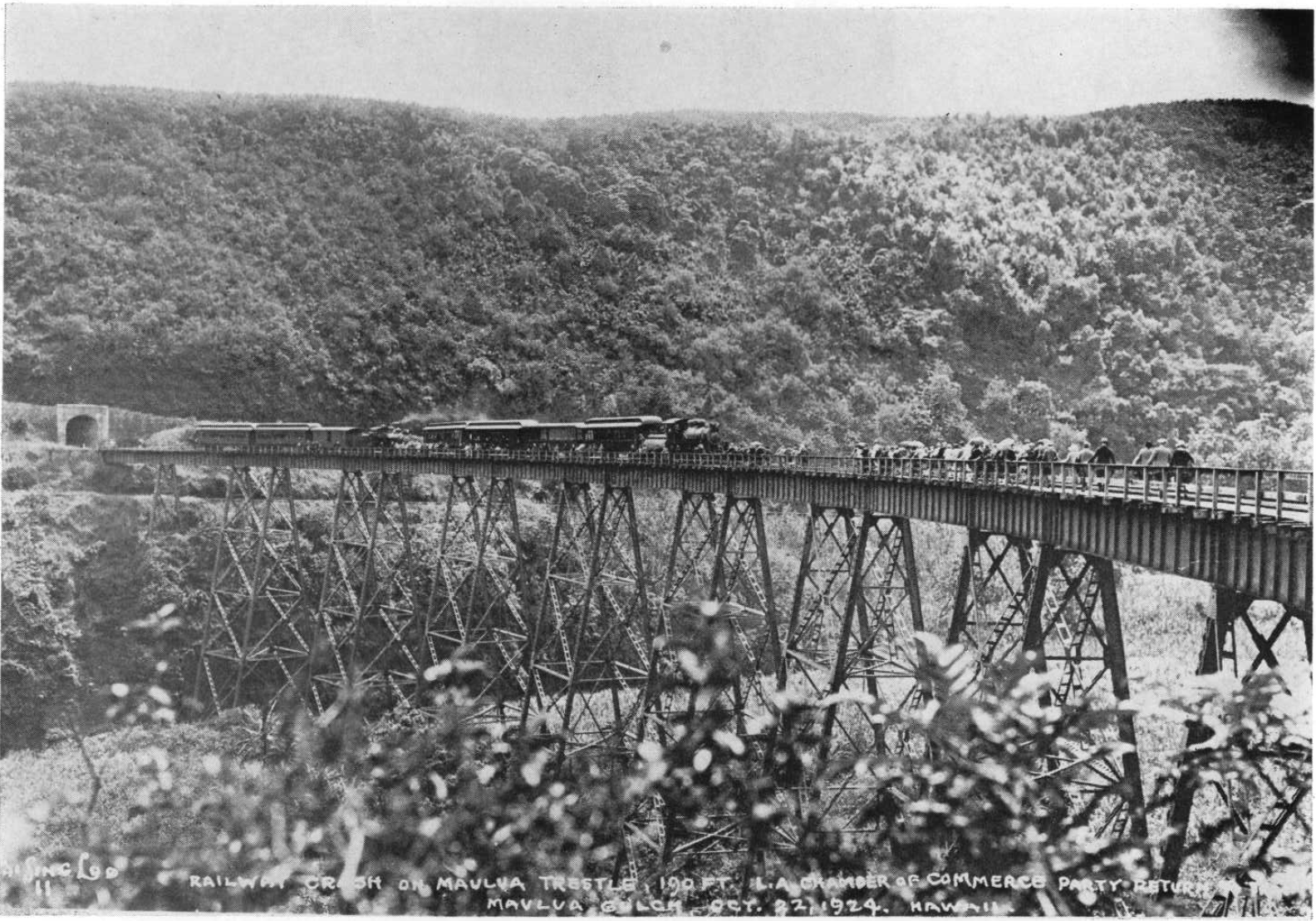
Collision of October 22, 1924 on the Maulua Stream Bridge

The first section, stretching 12.7 mi (20.4 km) from Hilo to the Hakalau Mill, was constructed between 1908 and 1911. The second phase, completed from Hakalau to Paʻauilo in 1912 or April 1913, included two of the longest bridges on the line (the Hakalau Bridge, 775 ft (236 m) long; and the Maulua Bridge, more than 1,000 ft (300 m) long). All the steel bridges were designed by John Mason Young, using steel girders with spans from 66 to 72 ft (20 to 22 m) long. By 1920, with the Hāmākua Division complete, HCR boasted a total of 88 mi (142 km) of rail.

=== Reorganization as Hawaii Consolidated Railway ===
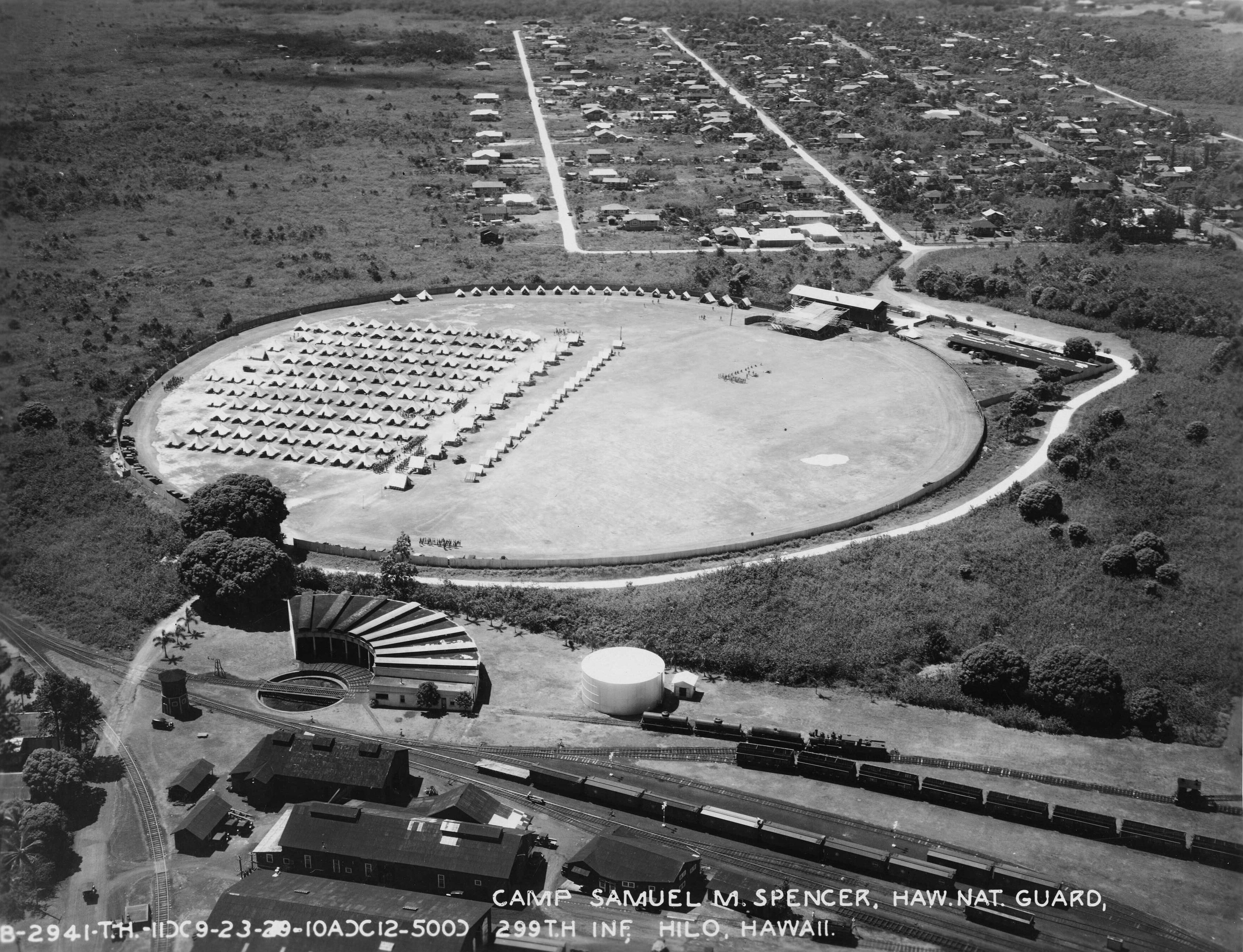
Camp Samuel with railroad shops in the foreground, 1929

To extend its existing line from eastern Hilo through Hāmākua, HRC also had to construct steel bridges over the Wailoa and Wailuku Rivers. Because of their near sea-level elevation, they were also vulnerable to rough seas, and were destroyed and replaced in 1923 (Wailoa) and 1924 (Wailuku).

The Wailuku River bridge collapsed on March 31, 1923, shortly after one fully loaded train had passed and just as another was approaching. In a separate incident, two passenger trains collided on the Maulua bridge on October 22, 1924; one train had stopped to disembark passengers, and the other had just emerged from the longest tunnel on the line. Passenger service over the Hāmākua line was provided by Hall-Scott motorcars pulling passenger trailers. In 1925, HCR ordered three railbuses from the White Motor Company to provide daily passenger service between Puna and Hilo, with a small turntable at Pahoa. Due to stiff competition from motor vehicles, the Glenwood extension was scaled back to Mountain View in 1926.

By 1937, HCR had increased its network to 106 1/3 mi (171.1 km) of tracks, but Volcano service and the branch line from Olaʻa to Glenwood was abandoned completely on October 29, 1938.

While the new Hāmākua line had been extremely expensive to build, and was costly to maintain, it was especially popular with tourists on HCR's Scenic Express service for ships calling at Hilo Harbor. Combined with regular passengers and traffic generated from the numerous sugar mills along the way, the HCR made great strides in paying down its debt. Increased revenue during World War II made the company more prosperous, and HCR was making a profit by the end of 1945.

=== Tsunami and closure ===
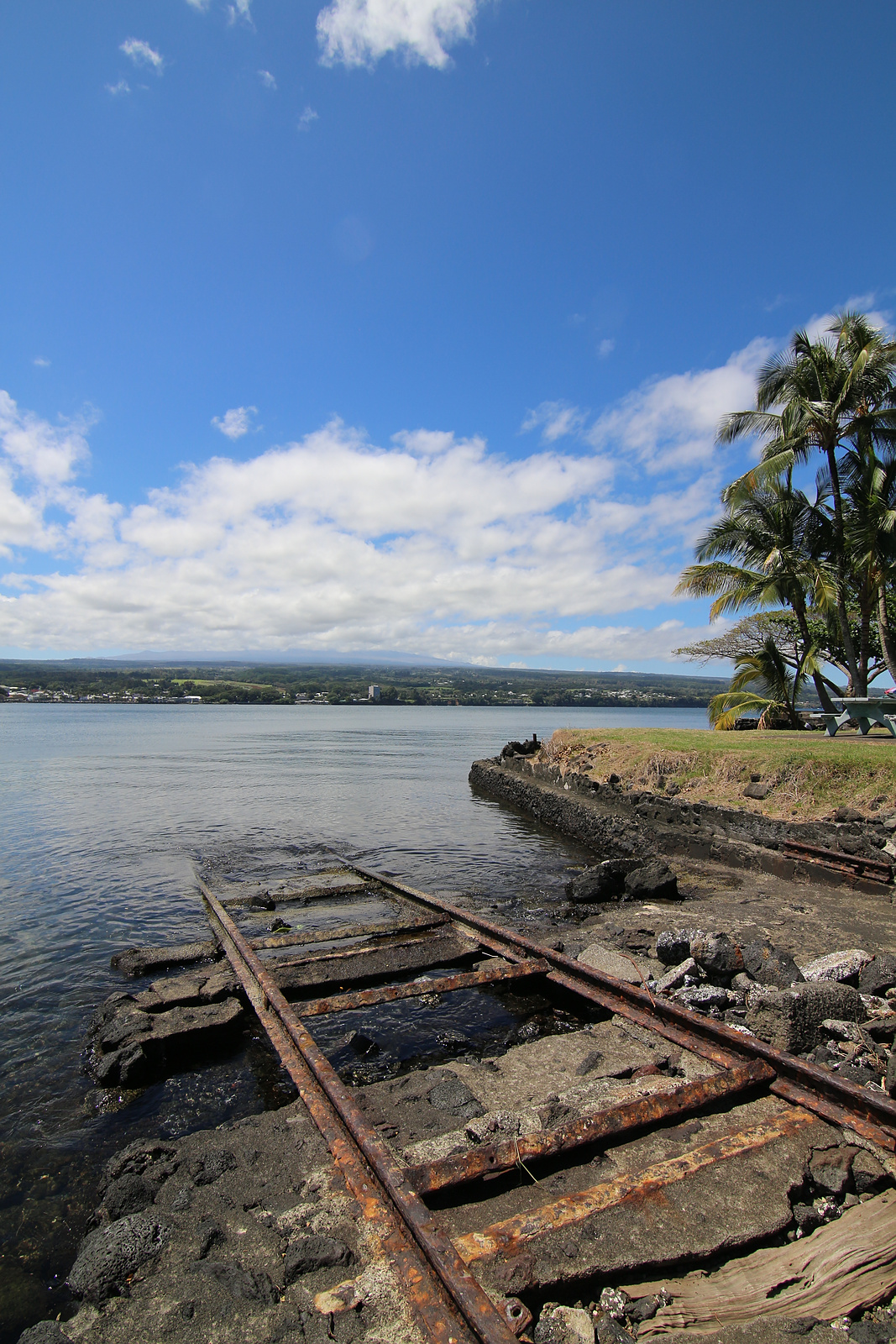
Abandoned rails on Hilo Bay (2017)

Ironically, just as the HCR was finally emerging from its long-standing financial troubles, it was hit with a blow from which it never recovered. On the morning of April 1, 1946, a massive tsunami caused by an earthquake in the Aleutian Islands struck Hilo and the Hāmākua coast, devastating the city and instantly wiping out a number of railroad bridges. Shareholders in HCR had already voted in March 1946 to discontinue rail operations. After the tsunami, the sugarcane plantations told HCR they intended to start shipping raw sugar to Hilo Harbor by truck; because the cost to repair the destruction was so massive, estimated at US$500,000 (equivalent to $8,260,000 in 2025), HCR filed for abandonment soon after the tsunami, receiving permission from the Interstate Commerce Commission to do so as of December 31, 1946. Parts of the original Hilo Railway line southeast from Hilo to ʻŌlaʻa were taken over by the local sugarcane plantations, but those were soon abandoned for trucks after December 1948.

HCR offered its entire right of way for the bridge-laden Hāmākua division without charge to the Territorial Government and county supervisors, who refused to accept it; HCR sold its entire railroad as scrap to Gilmore Steel & Supply Co. in San Francisco for $81,000. After the scrappers started dismantling the bridges, the Territorial Government decided to purchase the remaining bridges from Gilmore for US$303,723.53 (equivalent to $4,070,000 in 2025) to improve the routing of the Hawaii Belt Road north out of Hilo.

One of the only remnants of the railway is the roundhouse built in 1921 in Hilo at coordinates 19°43′12″N 155°4′00″W, just north of Hoʻolulu Park; the roundhouse is listed as one of the most endangered historic sites in Hawaii. As of November 2013, five of the original steel trestle bridges built by HRC have been retained along the Belt Road, albeit with significant modifications under the "Seismic Wave Damage Rehabilitation Project" of 1950. These span:

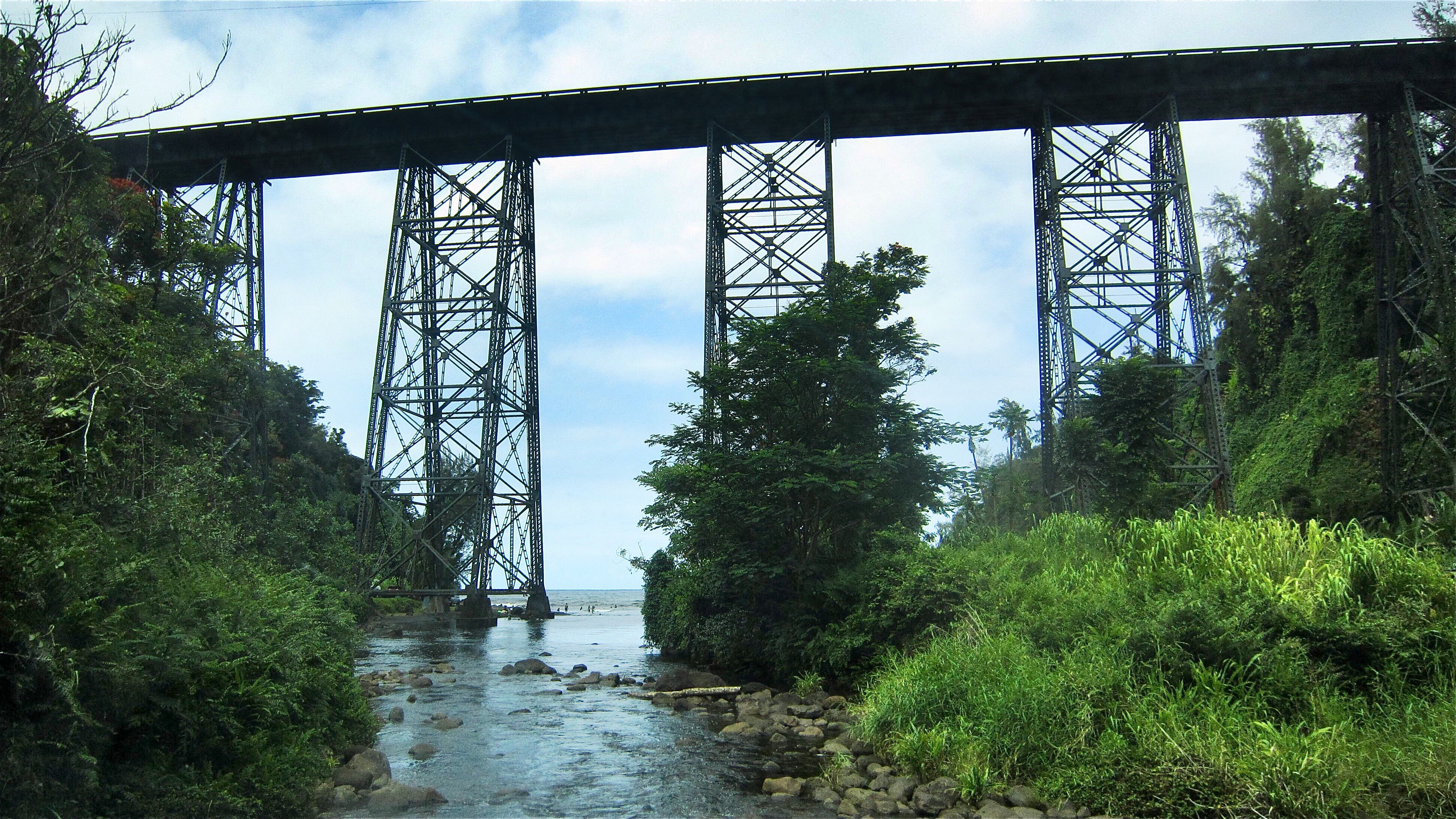
The Hawaii Belt Road bridge over Hakalau Stream (2012) is one of five remaining trestles originally built for the Hilo Railroad.

1. Kapuʻe Stream (milepost 6.28)
2. Pāheʻeheʻe Stream (milepost 13.31)
3. Hakalau Stream (milepost 15.30), 722 ft (220 m) long
4. Umauma Stream (milepost 16.02)
5. Nānue Stream (milepost 17.99), 528 ft (161 m) long and 208 ft (63 m) high (highest bridge)

In addition, some bridges were built using materials and foundations salvaged from the Hāmākua Division, including:

1. Wailuku River (milepost 2.49, reused piers)
2. Kolekole Stream (milepost 13.97, reused steel beams)
3. Hakalau Plantation Road (milepost 15.29, reused steel beams)

Information about this railway can be found at the Laupahoehoe Train Museum, located in the old station agent's house.
