= Kolekole Beach Park =

Hawaii county park on the island of Hawaii

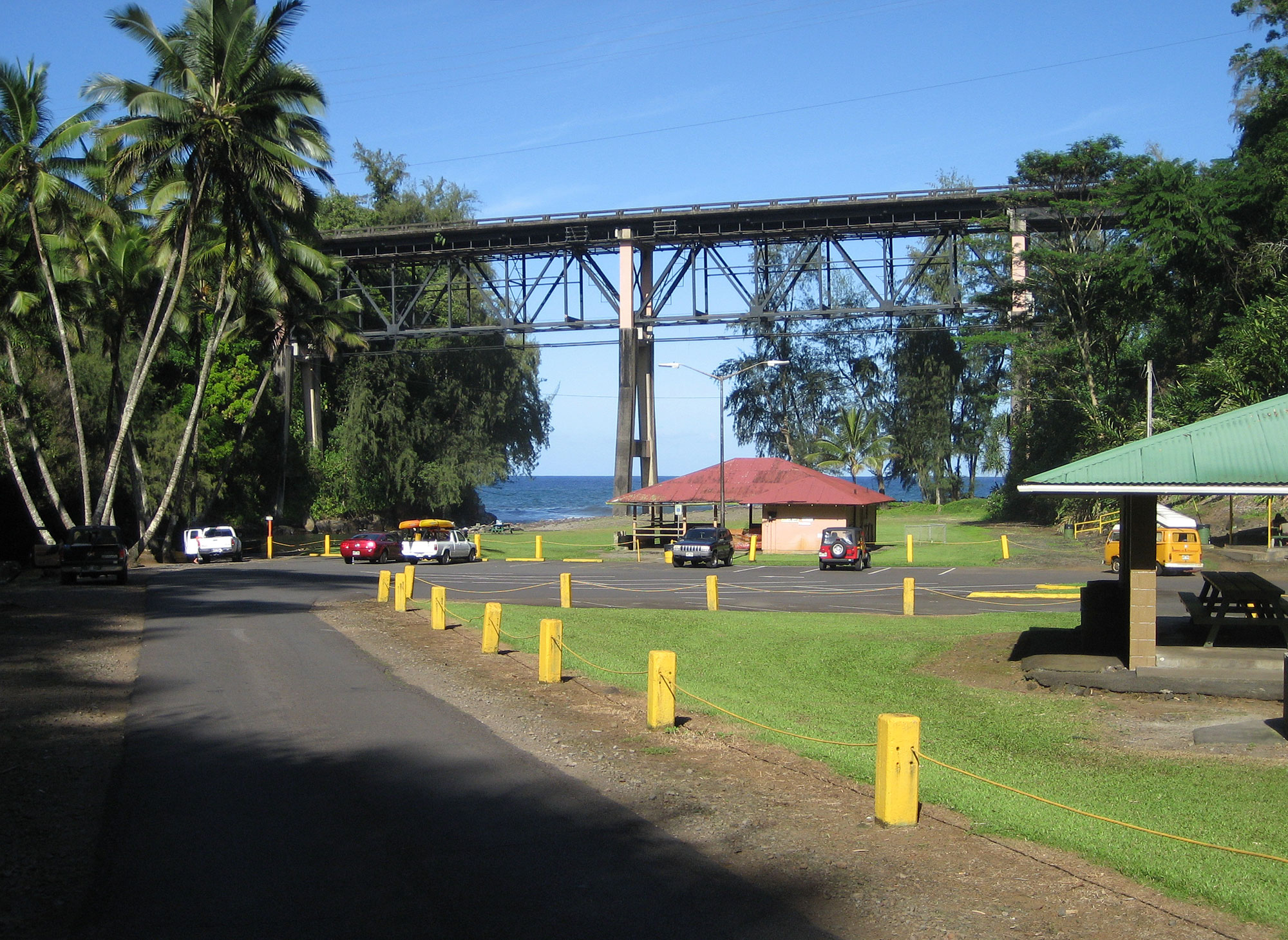
The bridge over the Kolekole Stream ravine

Kolekole Beach Park is a Hawaii county park on the island of Hawaii. After a prolonged closure due to lead contamination found in the soil of the lawn areas, the park is rescheduled for reopening on April 24, 2024, following the $6.3 million in upgrades to the park and its facilities. Big Island News Kolokole Reopening

The park is about 3 mi (4.8 km) downstream from ʻAkaka Falls, with an additional waterfall on the Kaʻahakini stream that drops directly from a small cliff into the main Kolekole Stream as it forms an estuary at the ocean. The stream passes through a rainforest containing several varieties of orchids. The stream flows about 12.4 miles (20.0 km) from an elevation of about 8,000 ft (2,400 m) on the eastern slope of Mauna Kea (at coordinates 19°48′42″N 155°21′52″W) to sea level.

The Hawaii Belt Road (state route 19) passes over the park on a high bridge. The park is located in the South Hilo District at coordinates 19°52′53″N 155°7′17″W near the 14 mile marker.

The name Kolekole means "raw or scarred" in the Hawaiian language. Camping is allowed with a permit.

The steel girder and truss bridge is over 500 ft (150 m) long. It provides the only major road between the town of Hilo and the Hāmākua district. It was originally built as a railroad bridge for sugarcane trains, but after the 1946 tsunami the railroad was abandoned and the bridge rebuilt for automobiles. E. Claude Moore was the County Engineer who designed and executed the plan to use the old railroad bridges to span the ravines for the Hawaii belt road. Claude Moore was a World War II veteran of the U.S. Army Corps of Engineers. He attended Iowa State College and worked for the Iowa Highway Commission prior to World War II. After the stint as County Engineer, Claude Moore worked as a Civil Engineer for C Brewer Company. He designed many subdivisions on the island, and was a long time Scout leader and Director of what is now HFS Credit Union.
