= Kohala, Hawaii =

Northwest portion of the island of Hawaii

The districts of the Big Island. From Northernmost, clockwise; North Kohala (highlighted), Hāmākua, North Hilo, South Hilo, Puna, Kaʻū, South Kona, North Kona, and South Kohala

The districts of the Big Island. From Northernmost, clockwise; North Kohala, Hāmākua, North Hilo, South Hilo, Puna, Kaʻū, South Kona, North Kona, and South Kohala (highlighted)

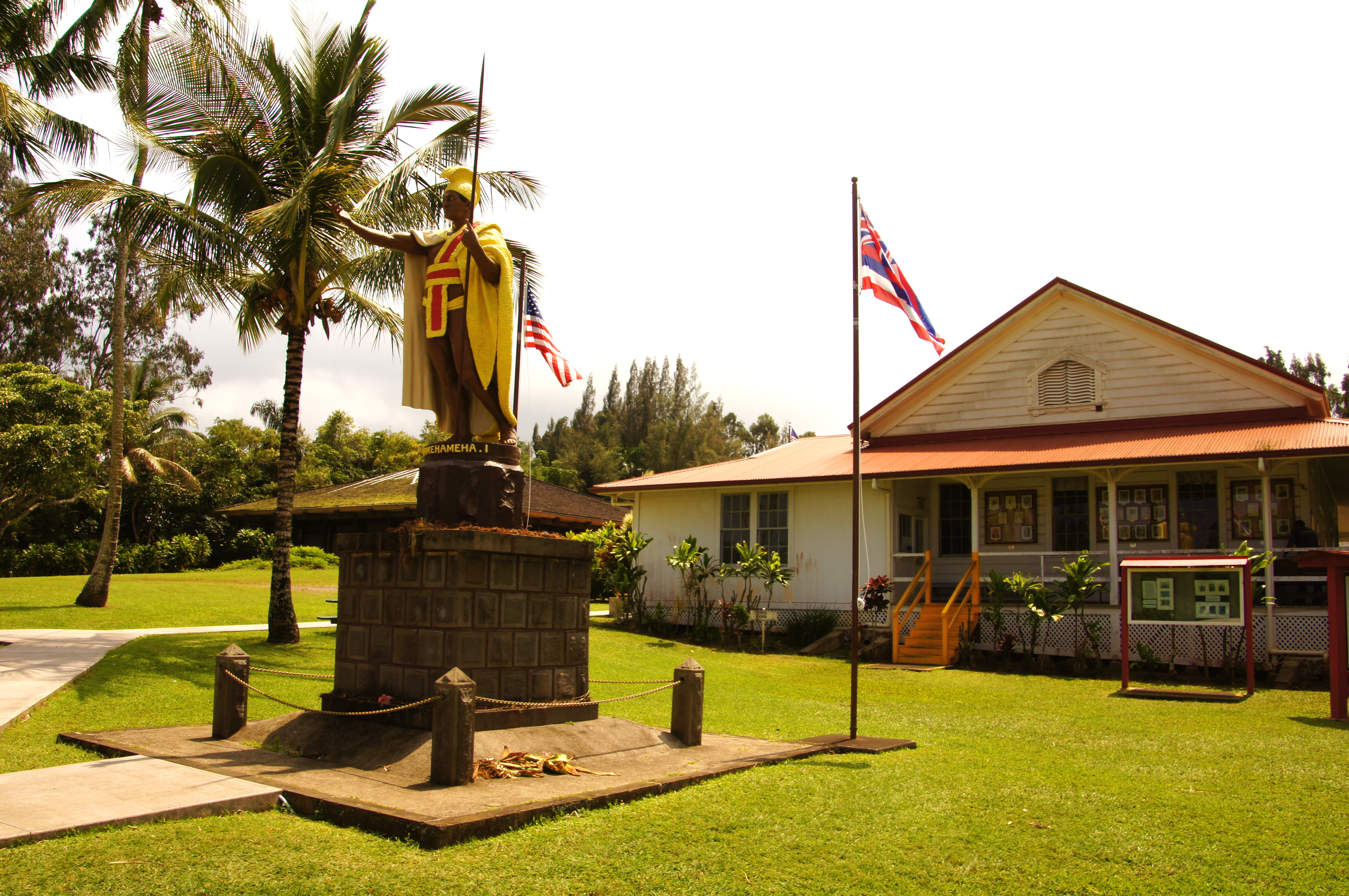
This is the original statue of the two Kamehameha Statues; this one cast in Paris and standing in the town of Kapaau.

Kohala (Hawaiian pronunciation: [koˈhɐlə]) is the name of the northwest peninsula of the island of Hawaiʻi in the Hawaiian Archipelago. In ancient Hawaii it was often ruled by an independent High Chief called the Aliʻi Nui. In modern times it is divided into two districts of Hawaii County: North Kohala and South Kohala. Locals commonly use the name Kohala to refer to the census-designated places of Halaʻula, Hāwī, and Kapaʻau collectively. The dry western shore is commonly known as the Kohala Coast, which has golf courses and seaside resorts.

== Description ==
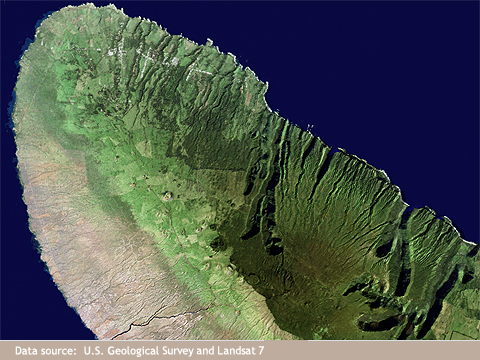
This Landsat satellite image of Kohala shows the effect of trade winds on vegetation and valley erosion

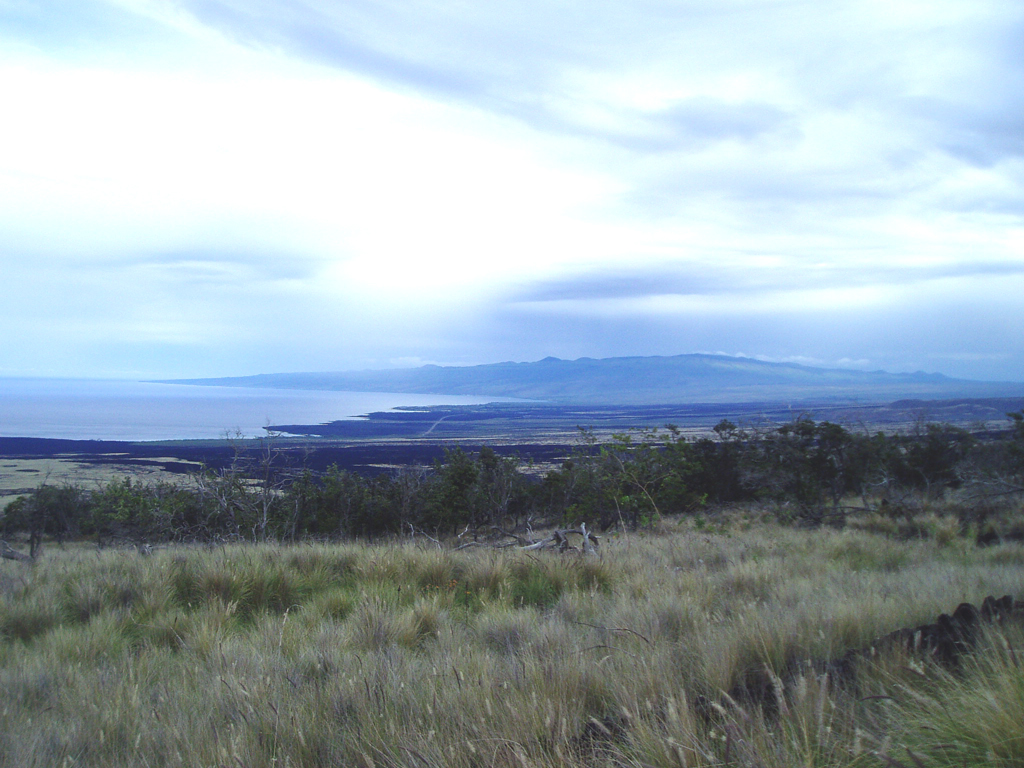
South Kohala District from Mamalahoa Highway

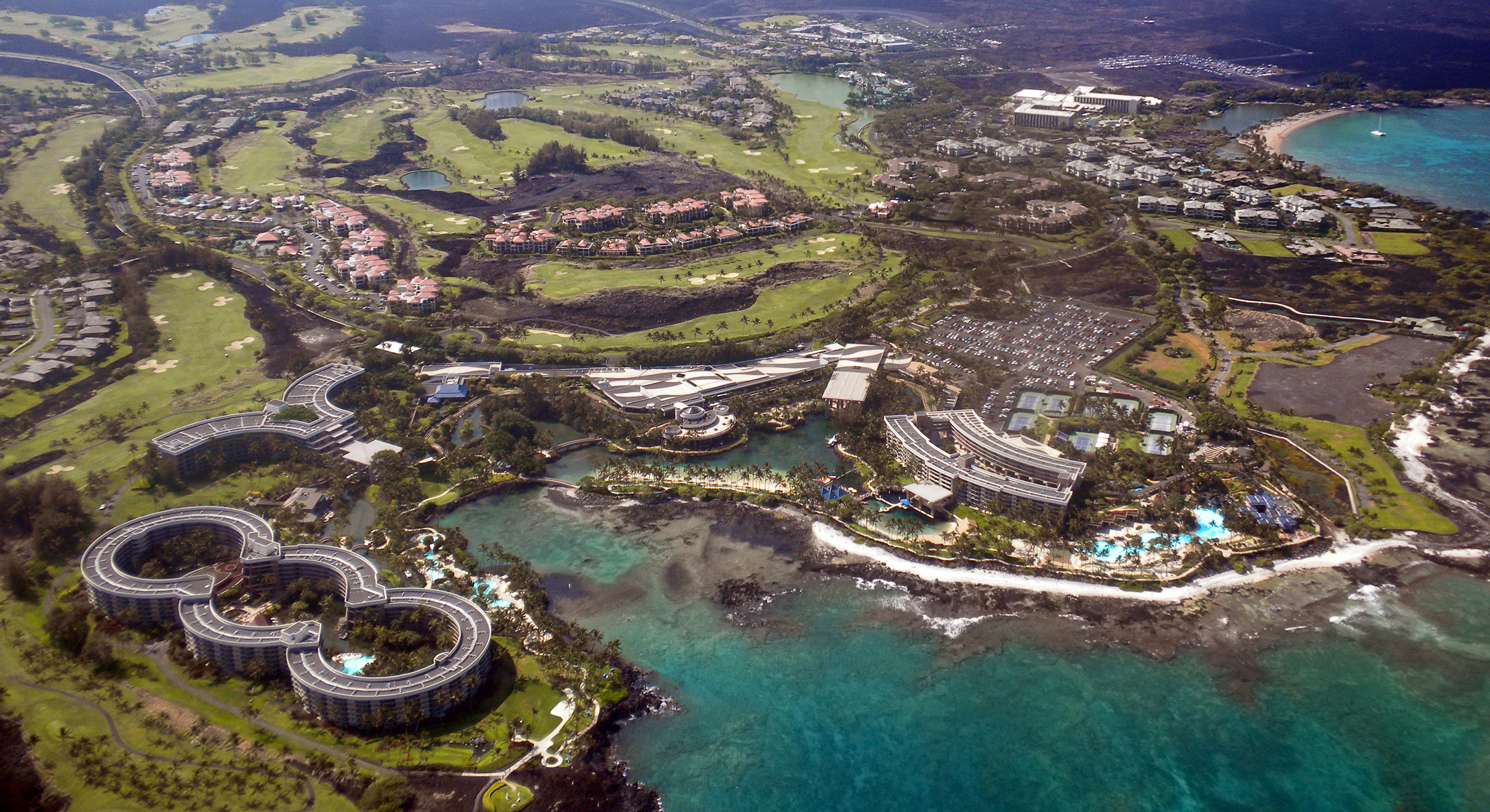
Hilton Waikoloa in the South Kohala district

The area was named after the dominating geological feature Kohala Mountain, the oldest of Hawaiʻi Island's five major volcanic mountains. The current districts cover the north and western sides of the mountain, 20°7′55″N 155°47′38″W. It was one of the five ancient divisions of the island called moku.

Kohala's natural habitats range across a wide rainfall gradient in a very short distance, from less than 5 inches (130 mm) a year on the coast near Kawaihae to more than 150 inches (3,800 mm) a year near the summit of Kohala Mountain, a distance of just 11 miles (18 km). Near the coast are remnants of dry forests, and near the summit is a cloud forest, a type of rainforest that obtains some of its moisture from "cloud drip" in addition to precipitation.

This precipitation allowed the northeast coast to be developed into sugarcane plantations, including one founded by Reverend Elias Bond to fund his church and girls' seminary.

== History ==
=== Kohala Historical Sites State Monument ===
The Kohala Historical Sites State Monument includes Moʻokini Heiau, a National Historic Landmark. King Kamehameha I, the first King of the unified Hawaiʻian Islands, was born in North Kohala west of Hāwī, at the ancient site called the Moʻokini Heiau. The heiau is a living spiritual temple, and not just an historic artifact of the Hawaiian culture.

The original Kamehameha Statue stands in front of the community center in Kapaʻau, and duplicates are found at Aliʻiolani Hale in Honolulu and in the U.S. Capitol building's statue gallery.

=== Bond Historic District ===
The Bond Historic District is in the North Kohala District, with structures from the Bond family's 19th-century missionary and homesteading period on the peninsula. The Bond District has three sections:

- Bond Homestead — the Bond House was built in the 1840s by the missionaries and later Kohala landowners Ellen and Elias Bond, and expanded by descendants through c. 1900.
- Kalahikiola Church
- Kohala Seminary

== Attractions ==
Points of interest in Kohala include Hapuna Beach State Recreation Area, Puʻukoholā Heiau National Historic Site, and Lapakahi State Historical Park.

== Transportation ==
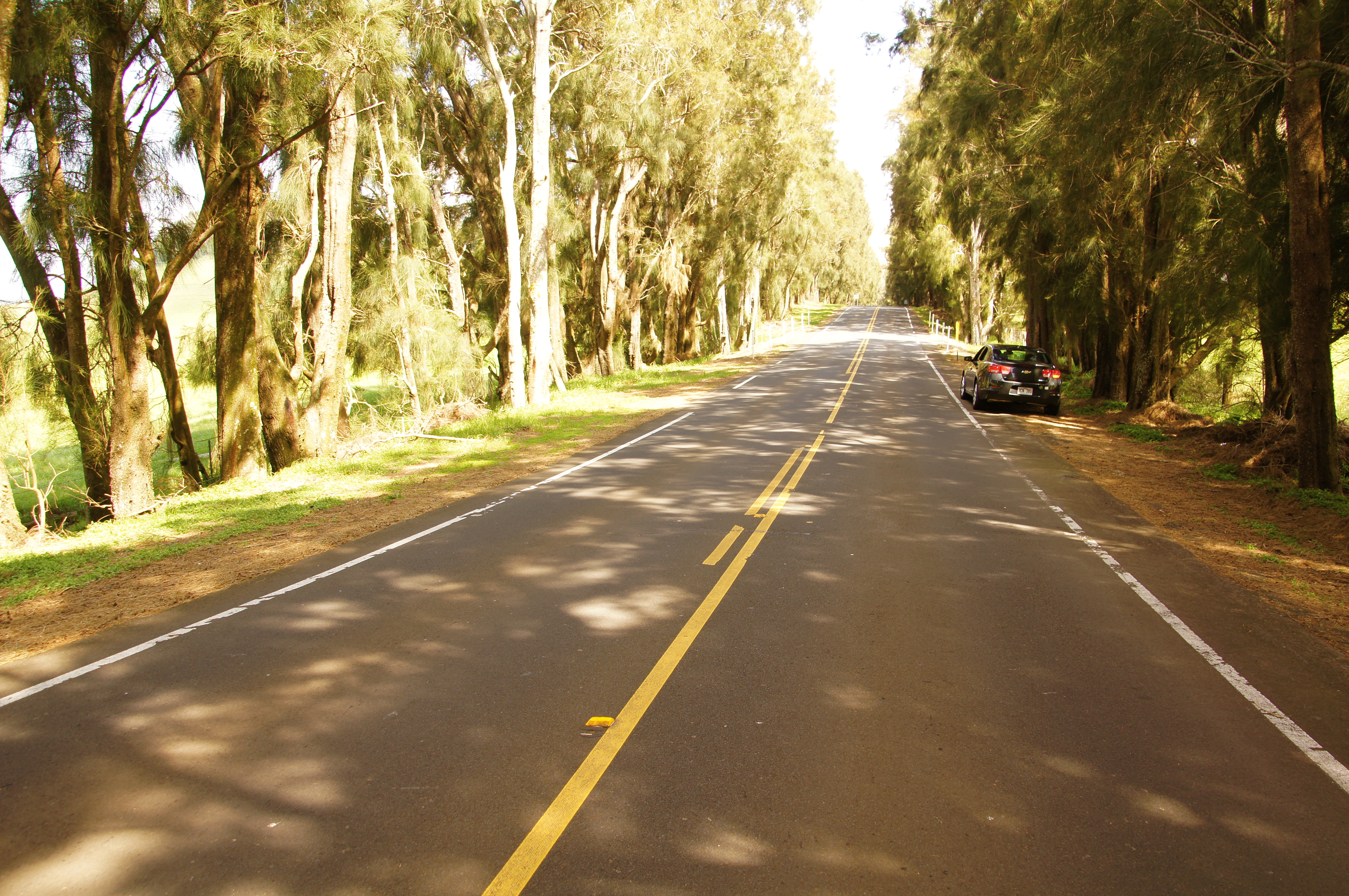
Ranch lands on both sides of a coniferous-lined Highway 250.

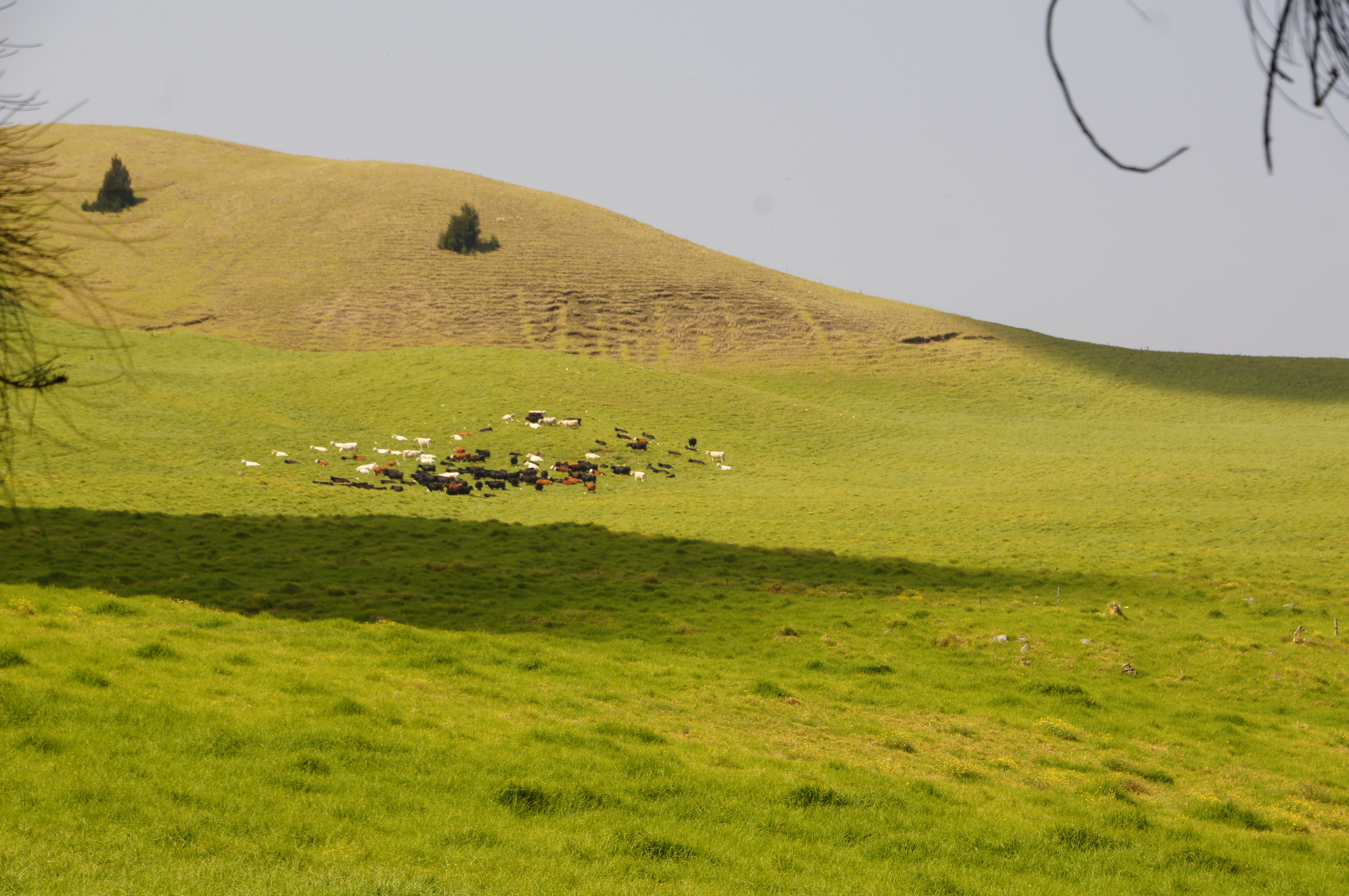
Views of ranch land may surprise some visitors to the Big Island. Looking southwest from the Kohala Mountain Road, Highway 250.

Major thoroughfares in Kohala include Akoni Pule Highway (Hawaii state route 270), which provides access to Pololū Valley. The Hawaii Belt Road connects the southern end of the Akoni Pule Highway to Kona in the south and Hāmākua to the east. The Kohala Mountain Road (250) provides a link between Waimea and the Kohala CDPs of Halaʻula, Hāwī, and Kapaʻau.

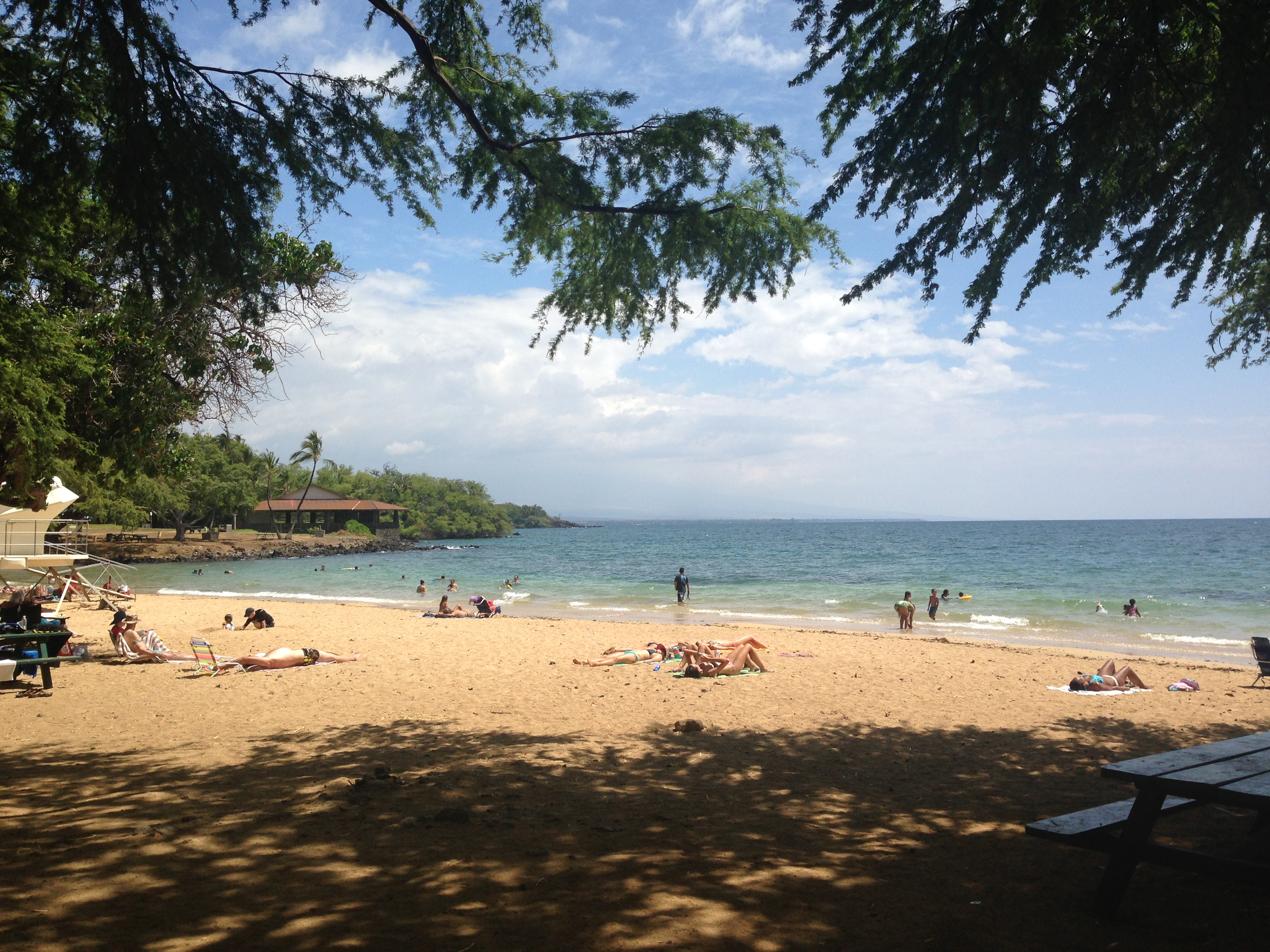
Spencer Beach Park on the South Kohala Coast

Kohala has two small airports. Upolu Airport is on Upolu Point at the island's northern tip. Waimea-Kohala Airport is south of Waimea. Waimea Airport is served commercially by Mokulele Airlines.

== Populations of Kohala ==
=== North Kohala ===
==== Census-designated places of North Kohala ====
- Halaʻula
- Hāwī
- Kapaʻau

=== South Kohala ===
==== Census-designated places of South Kohala ====
- Puako
- Waikoloa Village
- Waimea

==== Unincorporated towns of South Kohala ====
- Kawaihae

== Notable residents ==
- Auliʻi Cravalho, actress and singer

== See also ==
- The Fairmont Orchid
- Mauna Kea Beach Hotel
