= Hawaiʻi Belt Road =

Highway in Hawaii, US

Hawaiʻi Belt Road
- Māmalahoa Highway
- Map of the Island of Hawaiʻi with the Hawaiʻi Belt Road highlighted in red and blue

Route information
- Maintained by HDOT and HCDPW
- Length: 260.43 mi (419.12 km): 121.97 mi (196.29 km) via Route 11; 99.49 mi (160.11 km) via Route 19; 38.97 mi (62.72 km) via Route 190
- Existed: 1783–present
- History: Completed in 1975
- Component highways: Route 11 from Hilo to Kailua-Kona; Route 19 from Kailua-Kona to Hilo; Route 190 from Kailua-Kona to Waimea

Major junctions
- Beltway around the Island of Hawaiʻi
- Route 270 in Kawaihae; Route 200 near Waikoloa Village; Route 250 in Waimea; Route 200 in Hilo

Location
- Country: United States
- State: Hawaii

Highway system
- Routes in Hawaii
← Route 8940	→ Route 19
← Route 11	→ Route 30
← Route 160	→ Route 197

The Hawaiʻi Belt Road is a modern name for the Māmalahoa Highway and consists of Hawaiʻi state Routes 11, 19, and 190 that encircle the Island of Hawaiʻi. The southern section, between Hilo and Kailua-Kona is numbered as Route 11. The section between Hilo and Waimea is Route 19. Between Waimea and Kailua-Kona, the road is split in two: the original "mauka" route (now Route 190) and a "makai" Route 19, completed in 1975, which serves as access to the Kona and Kohala Coast resorts. In the Hawaiian language, mauka means "towards the mountain" and makai means "towards the sea". These terms are commonly used in travel directions.

Parts of the southern half of the Hawaiʻi Belt Road were known during the Territorial days as the Kaʻū Belt Road. The names "Hawaiʻi Belt Road" and "Māmalahoa Highway" refer to the road system that encircles the entire island; many sections are also referenced by local names.

== History ==
Māmalahoa Highway was named for the royal decree by King Kamehameha I after an incident he and his party experienced in 1783.

As he prepared to unite the islands of Hawaiʻi, Kamehameha I would conduct shoreline raids on the neighboring ahupuaʻa (traditional land divisions). It was on one such incursion that the King's warriors encountered two local fishermen along the Puna coast. The two fled to warn others of the pending attack and Kamehameha and his men took chase. When they crossed a lava field, one of the King's feet got caught in a crevice.

The fishermen, seizing the opportunity to retaliate, returned and attacked. In the ensuing brawl, one of the King's steersmen was killed and Kamehameha himself received a blow to the head that was so hard that it splintered the man's weapon – a solid koa canoe paddle. The two Puna men escaped.

Kamehameha I opted not to retaliate but instead took this as a lesson: The strong must not mistreat the weak, his people must be assured protection from harm's way in their pursuits and that safe passage must be everyone's entitlement. A decade later, King Kamehameha I, upon reflecting on his deliverance that day in Puna and on the memory of his fallen warrior, proclaimed Ke Kānāwai Māmalahoe – "The Law of the Splintered Paddle" – at Kahaleʻioleʻole in the Kaipalaoa area of Hilo.

Ke Kānāwai Māmalahoe

E nā kānaka,
E mālama ʻoukou i ke Akua,
A e mālama hoʻi ke kanaka nui
a me kanaka iki;
E hele ka ʻelemakule,
ka luahine a me ke kama
A moe i ke ala
ʻAʻohe mea nanā e hoʻopilikia.
Hewa nō, make.

Translation:

Law of the Splintered Paddle

O my people
Honour thy God,
Respect alike [the rights of] the great man
and the humble man;
See to it that the old man,
the aged woman and the child
Sleep by the side of the path
Without the fear of harm.
Disobey, die!

Ke Kānāwai Māmalahoe is considered such an important law to the Hawaiians that at the 1978 Constitutional Convention it was added to the Constitution of Hawaiʻi. In it, the law protects the public and the safety of all who travel throughout the Islands, including fishermen, gatherers, hunters and visitors alike.

Hawaiʻi Constitution (Article IX, Section 10) — Public Safety
The Law of the Splintered Paddle, Ke Kānāwai Māmalahoe, [as] decreed by Kamehameha I, [that] every elderly person, woman and child lie by the roadside in safety, shall be a unique and living symbol of the State's concern for public safety. The State shall have the power to provide for the safety of the people from crimes against persons and property.
(Add ConCon 1978 and election November 7, 1978.)

The Māmalahoa trail was a foot trail built in the nineteenth century, which developed into this highway. Various parts were widened and re-aligned over the years. Much of the Hawaiʻi Belt Road through North Hilo and Hāmākua districts was built on the roadbed and bridges of the Hawaii Consolidated Railway as part of the recovery from a tsunami that ravaged the island's northeast coast in 1946.

In 2007, Queen Ka‘ahumanu Highway was widened to four lanes from Henry Street in Kailua-Kona to Kealakehe Parkway. In September 2015, ground broke to extend the widening project from Kealakehe Parkway to Keāhole Airport Road, which provides access to Ellison Onizuka Kona International Airport. The project costed about $121 million and was finished on August 8, 2018.

== Route description ==
=== Route 11 ===
The mile 0 marker is at the intersection of Kamehameha Avenue (Route 19), Banyan Drive and Kanoelehua Avenue in Hilo. After about a mile is the intersection with Pūʻāinakō Street (Route 2000), which connects to the Saddle Road. Route 11 then continues along Kanoelehua Avenue towards Keaʻau where it becomes Volcano Highway near milepost 4 before crossing into Puna District. Volcano Highway intersects with the terminus of Keaʻau-Pāhoa Road (Route 130) past mile 6 and Old Keaʻau-Pāhoa Road (Route 130), then continues through the towns of Kurtistown, Mountain View, Glenwood and Volcano Village.

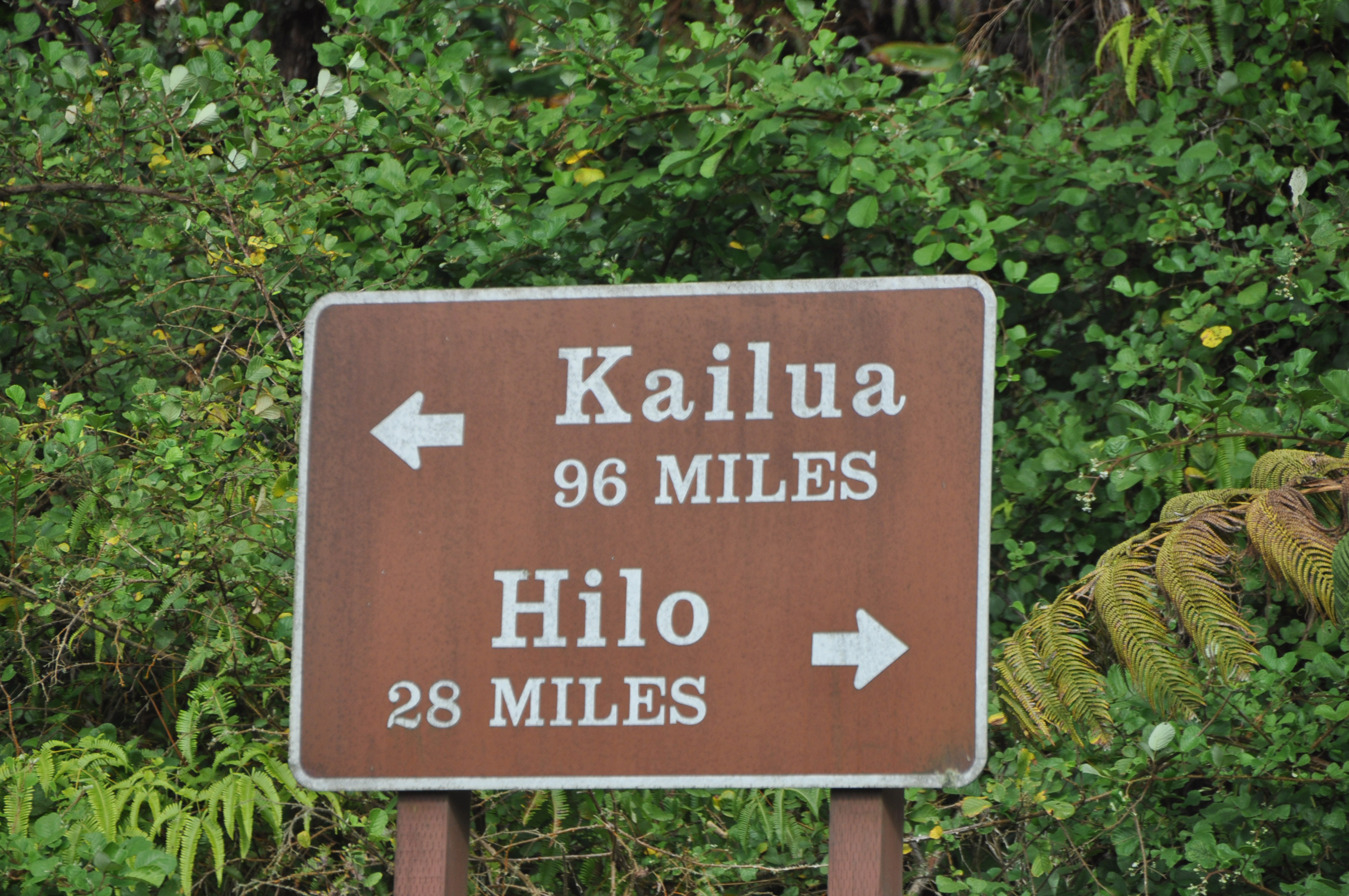
A sign across the road from the Hawaii Volcanoes National Park entrance

Just beyond the Kaʻū District line, the entrance to Hawaiʻi Volcanoes National Park at mile 28 marks another name change, back to Māmalahoa Highway. The two lane road crests (4,024 feet (1,227 m)) just before the mile 30 marker and then heads down a long downhill stretch through the Kaʻū desert towards the black sands of Punaluʻu Beach Park, passing macadamia orchards near the town of Pāhala at mile 51 and the Sea Mountain Resort in Nīnole at mile 56.

Next are Nāʻālehu (mile 63), the southernmost community in the US, and Waiʻōhinu (mile 65) which was a retreat for Mark Twain. A winding uphill climb yields to a meandering country lane where South Point Road, near mile 69, leads to Ka Lae (south point).

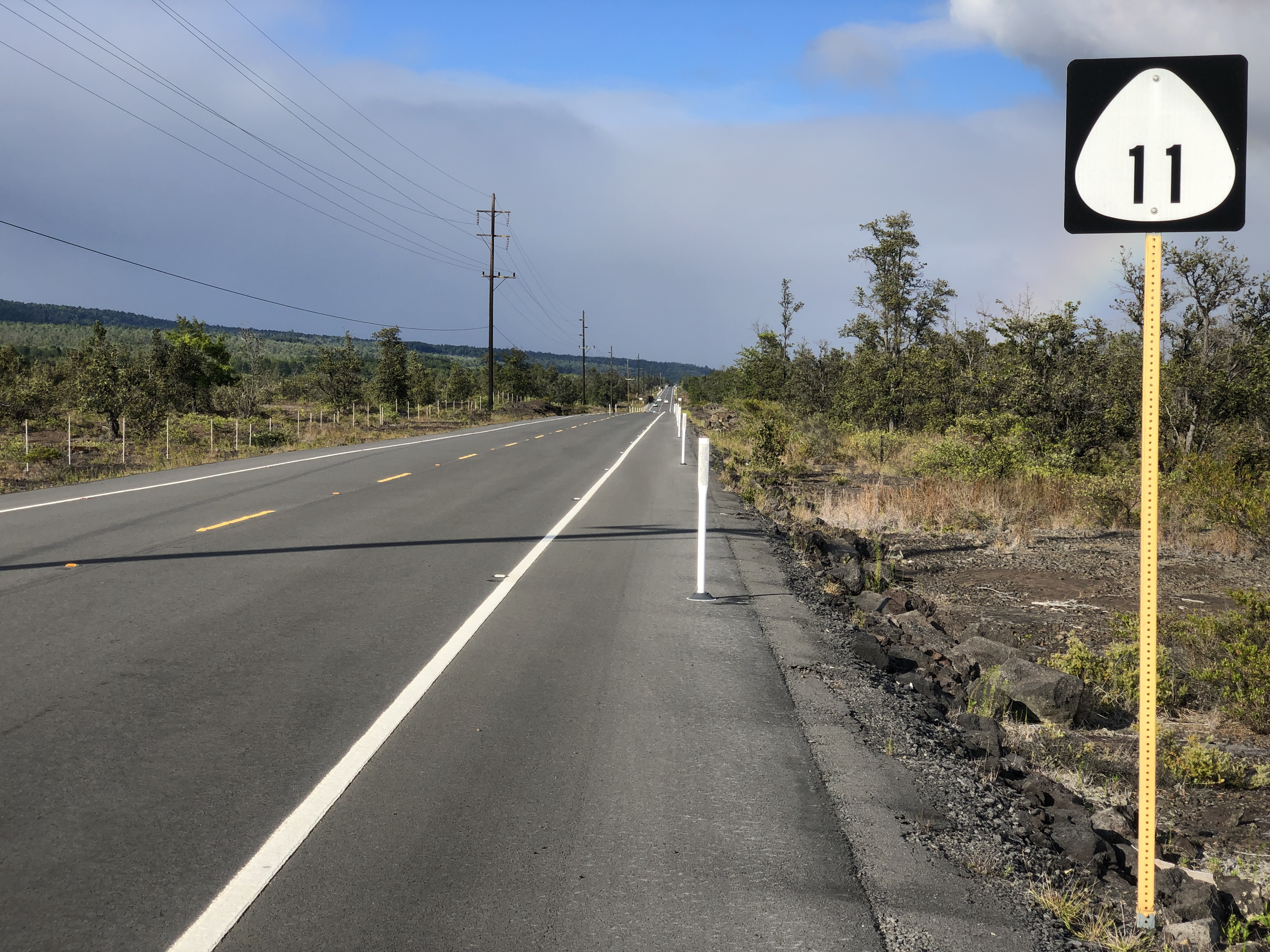
Route 11 eastbound between Pahala and Volcanoes National Park

Another comfortable stretch of two lane road and a return to highway speeds begins past the mile 71 marker. Māmalahoa Highway crosses Mauna Loa's 1907 Lava Flow — there is a scenic point at mile 75 — before passing through Ocean View between Tiki Lane and Aloha Boulevard. Just past mile 82 is the South Kona District line.

Starting at mile 89, Māmalahoa Highway has sharp curves and a steep drop-off along the coastal side. Many small fishing villages dot the coast, including Miloliʻi, Pāpā Bay, Kona Paradise and Hoʻokena. The macadamia orchards soon give way to another tree crop. This is Kona coffee Country.

Keala o Keawe Road (Route 160), just before mile 104, serves as access to Puʻuhonua o Hōnaunau National Historic Park and St. Benedict's Catholic Church. Further along is the town of Captain Cook, named for the famed English explorer Captain James Cook. Nāpōʻopoʻo Road (Route 160) leads down to Nāpōʻopoʻo and Kealakekua Bay, site of the monument to Cook's death.

After mile 111 come the towns of Kealakekua, Kainaliu and Honalo. At "Coffee Junction" (mile 114), Māmalahoa Highway continues straight and eventually becomes Route 180, Route 11 veers to left and becomes Kuakini Highway. A 5-mile (8.0 km) stretch from Honalo and then along the upper road until it rejoins the main Belt Road at Palani Junction is under consideration to be designated a National Scenic Byway. It was called the Kona Heritage Corridor by the state. A somewhat steep descent off Puʻuloa drops into the town of Kailua-Kona.

Just past Lako Street is where Kuakini Highway branches to the left and Highway 11 becomes Queen Kaʻahumanu Highway. In the vicinity of mile 121, Hualālai Road (Route 182, incorrectly signed as "180") crosses at an exaggerated angle (a rare concurrent route). Route 11 finally reaches the crossroads of the “Queen K” and Palani Road, pinpointing the termini of all three Hawaiʻi Belt Road route numbers.

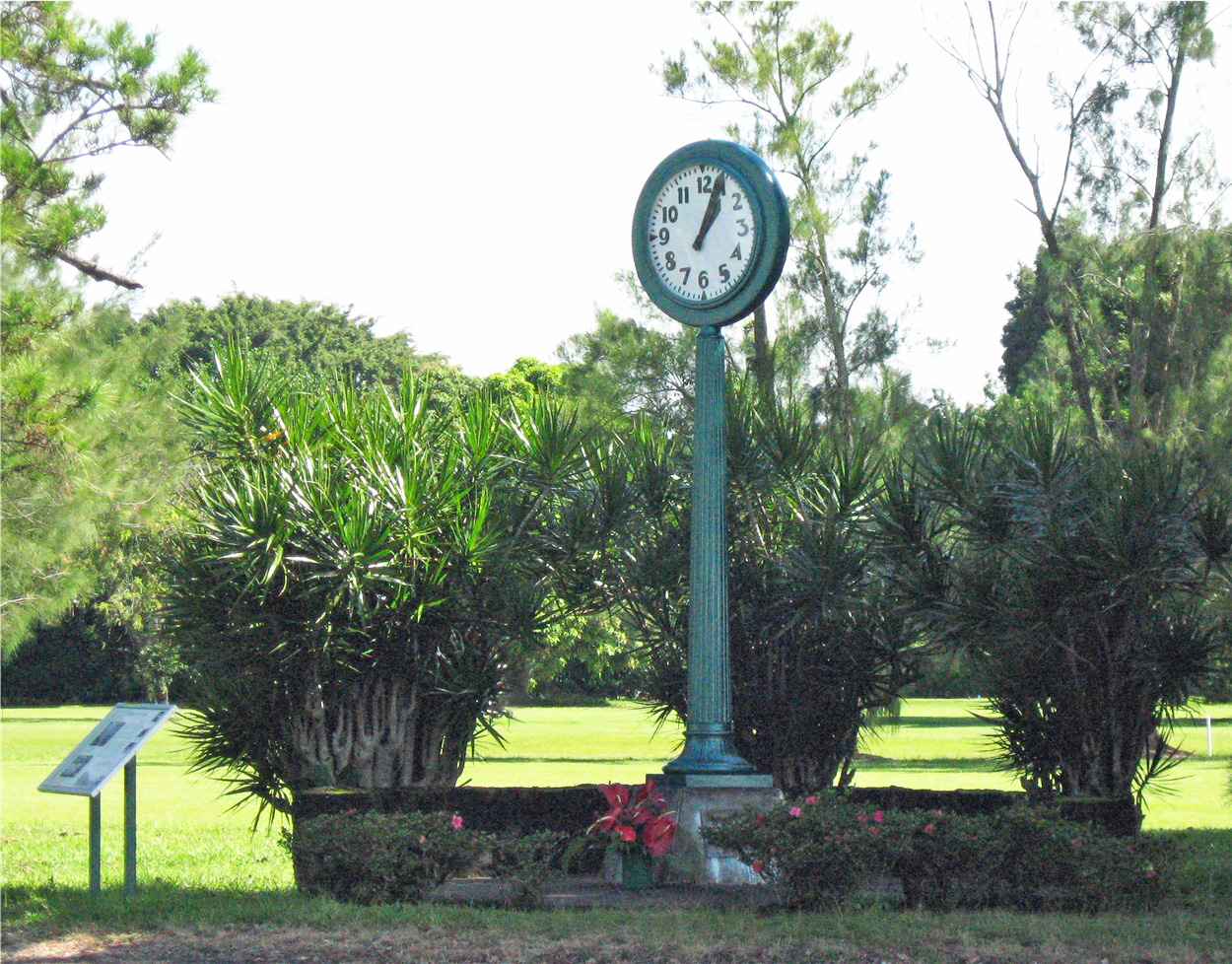
1960 Tsunami memorial clock

=== Route 19 ===
Tucked away at the gates to Hilo Wharf on Kūhiō Street is the mile 0 marker for Route 19. One block later, it then turns right onto Kalanianaʻole Avenue, running between the waters of Hilo Bay and the Runway 8/26 of Hilo International Airport, before crossing Kanoelehua Avenue (Route 11) and Banyan Drive where the name changes to Kamehameha Avenue. Flanking the Wailoa River (Hawaii) Bridge is the 1960 Tsunami Memorial Clock with its hands frozen at the moment the killer waves struck early morning on May 23, 1960.

The highway continues along Kamehameha Avenue, paralleling a closed section of Bayfront Highway (used as access and parking for Hilo Bayfront Park), then turns right onto Pauahi Street before quickly turning left onto the open section of Bayfront Highway. Bayfront Highway, which serves as a bypass for the downtown business district of Hilo, is often closed to traffic by the Hawaiʻi County Police Department in times of high surf.

Past the intersection with Waiānuenue Avenue (Route 200, known as the Saddle Road), Route 19 crosses over the Wailuku River via a converted railroad plate girder bridge with a metal grate roadway that causes tires to “sing” as vehicles pass over it. Leaving Hilo, the route assumes the name Hawaiʻi Belt Road, leaving Māmalahoa Highway to the older decommissioned portions of the original thoroughfare. Many former sugarcane plantation towns dot the highway, including Wainaku, Paukaʻa and Pāpaʻikou.

Shortly after the mile 7 marker, part of the old Māmalahoa Highway crosses Hawaiʻi Belt Road. The road to the right leads down the “Onomea Scenic Drive,” a 4-mile (6.44 km) loop road that crosses several one-lane wooden bridges and past the Hawaiʻi Tropical Botanical Garden overlooking Onomea Bay before returning to Hawaiʻi Belt Road at mile 10 in Pepeʻekeō.

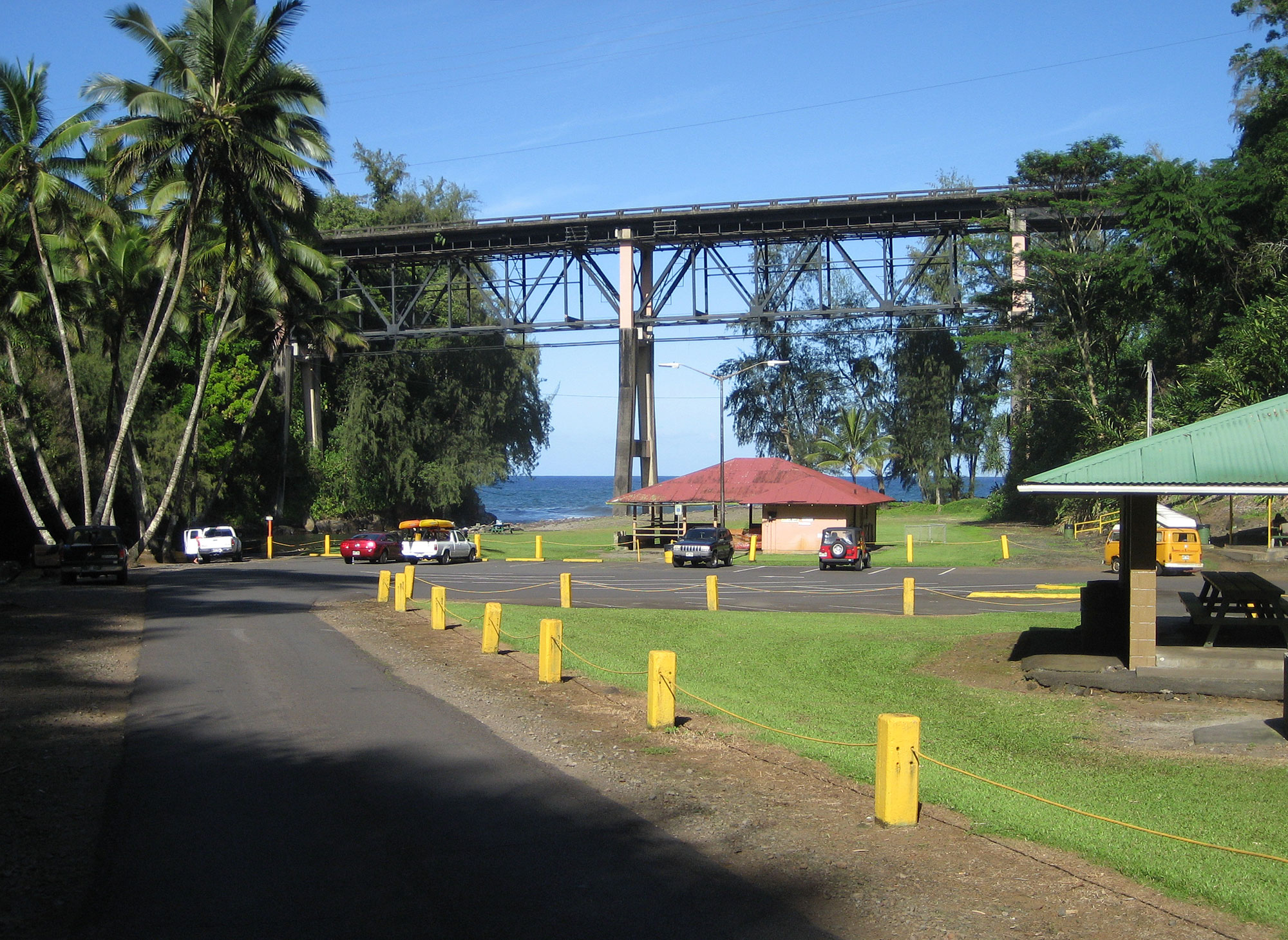
Hawaii Belt Road crosses over Kolekole Beach Park

Hawaiʻi Belt Road meets the rugged Hāmākua coastline near mile 12. A left turn onto Honomū Road (Route 220) leads to ʻAkaka Falls State Park, home of the namesake 442-foot (135 m) tall waterfall and the slightly shorter Kahūnā Falls. These waters empty in the Pacific Ocean at Kolekole Beach Park past mile 14.

The Hakalau Bridge carries Route 19 from the South Hilo District to North Hilo District. A number of cascades are visible from the road on the “mauka” side of the highway. Umauma Falls lies inside the World Botanical Gardens, but two other falls are viewed from the Umauma Bridge (between mile 16 and mile 17). Between mile 18 and mile 19 is Nānue Stream with another picturesque waterfall.

The highway negotiates three sharp curves: Maulua (mile 22), Laupāhoehoe (mile 26) and Kaʻawaliʻi (mile 28). Maulua Gulch has a small waterfall emptying into the ocean (visible from the Hilo side by looking across the gulch) and another in the back part of the gorge near the base of the radio tower. Also, an abandoned railroad tunnel is sometimes visible from the Hāmākua side. The Laupāhoehoe Railroad Museum is located on the “mauka” side past mile 25. On the other side of Laupāhoehoe Gulch, an access road leads down to Laupāhoehoe Point Beach Park where the victims of the 1946 “April Fool’s Day” tsunami are memorialized.

The Hāmākua District begins on the opposite side of Kaʻula Bridge (mile 30). Highway speeds are now the norm but caution must be observed when crossing the narrow “Curved Bridge” near mile 32. This bridge was replaced in May 2010 by a new bridge with less curvature. Hamlets with names like Kūkaʻiau, Paʻauilo, Kalōpā and Pāʻauhau were once homes for sugar plantation workers from countries like the Philippines, China and Japan.

Māmane Street (Route 240, mile 42) spurs off to the right to become the main street of Honokaʻa before providing access to Waipiʻo Valley. Old Māmalahoa Highway branches uphill to wind through rugged hills of Āhualoa and is a scenic but slower route to Waimea. Meanwhile, Hawaiʻi Belt Road makes its way through fog-shrouded eucalyptus stands.

The Old Māmalahoa Highway rejoins Route 19 near mile 52 where they cross into South Kohala District. Now again called Māmalahoa Highway, Route 19 continues into the town of Waimea (known as Kamuela by the Post Office), the headquarters for Parker Ranch and the heart of paniolo (Hawaiian cowboy) country.

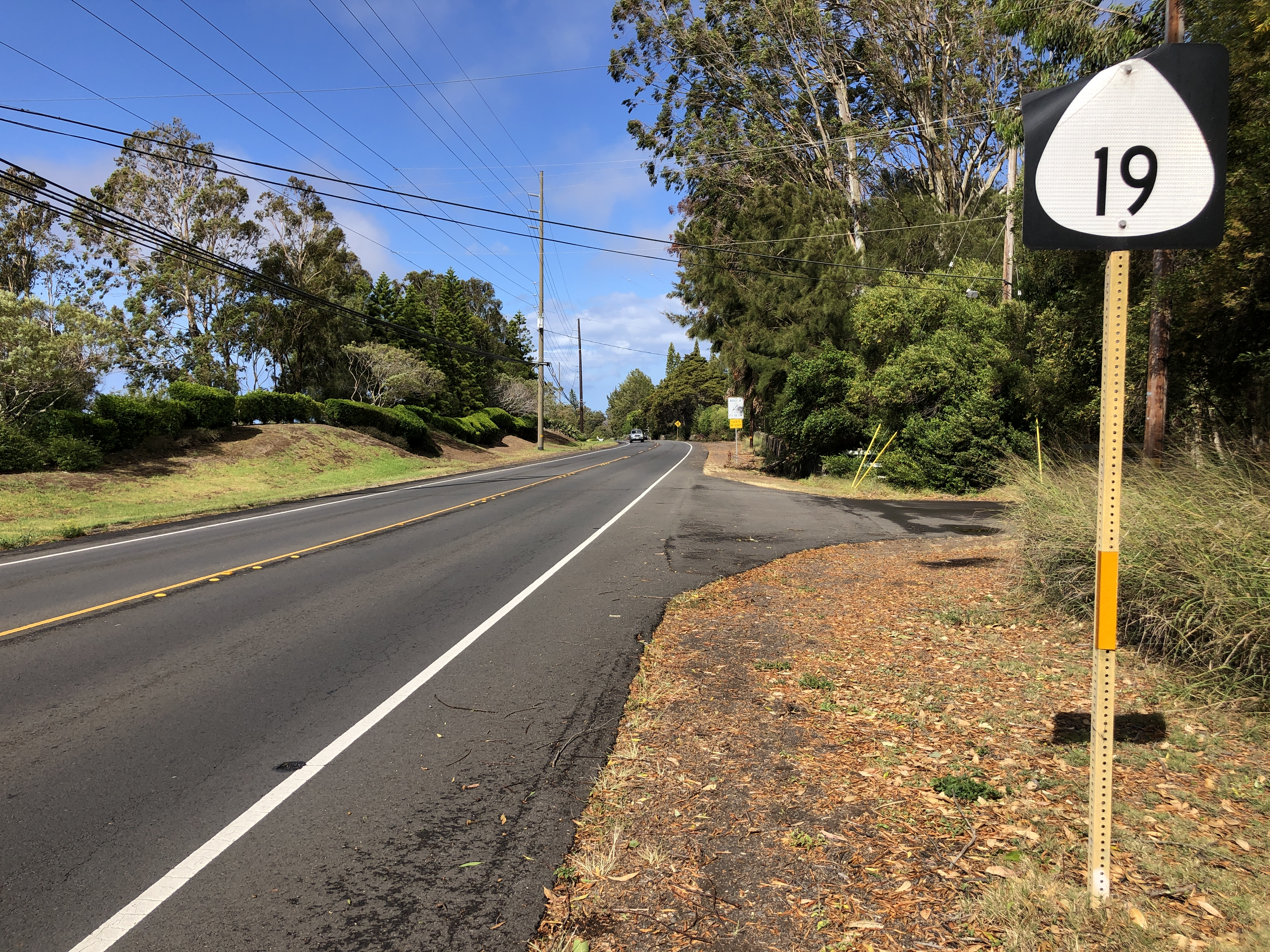
Route 19 westbound departing Waimea

At mile 57, the route turns right onto Lindsey Road (see Route 190). One block down, Route 19 spurs left onto Kawaihae Road, past a row of restaurants and before starting downhill towards the coast. Just beyond mile 59 is a “Y” junction with Kohala Mountain Road (Route 250) in front of Hawaiʻi Preparatory Academy.

Queen Kaʻahumanu Highway begins at the "T" intersection with Akoni Pule Highway (Route 270) past mile 67 outside Kawaihae. Completed in 1975, “The Queen K” connects the resort properties of Mauna Kea Beach (mile 68), Mauna Lani (mile 73), Waikōloa Beach (mile 76) and Kaʻūpūlehu (mile 87) with the Keāhole-Kona International Airport (mile 83) and the town of Kailua-Kona. Some beaches include Hāpuna, Holoholokai, ʻAnaehoʻomalu, Makalawena, Kekaha Kai State Park and Kaloko-Honokōhau.

The terminus of Route 19 is at the crossroads of Palani Road (Route 190) at mile 100 where Queen Kaʻahumanu Highway continues as Route 11.

=== Route 190 ===
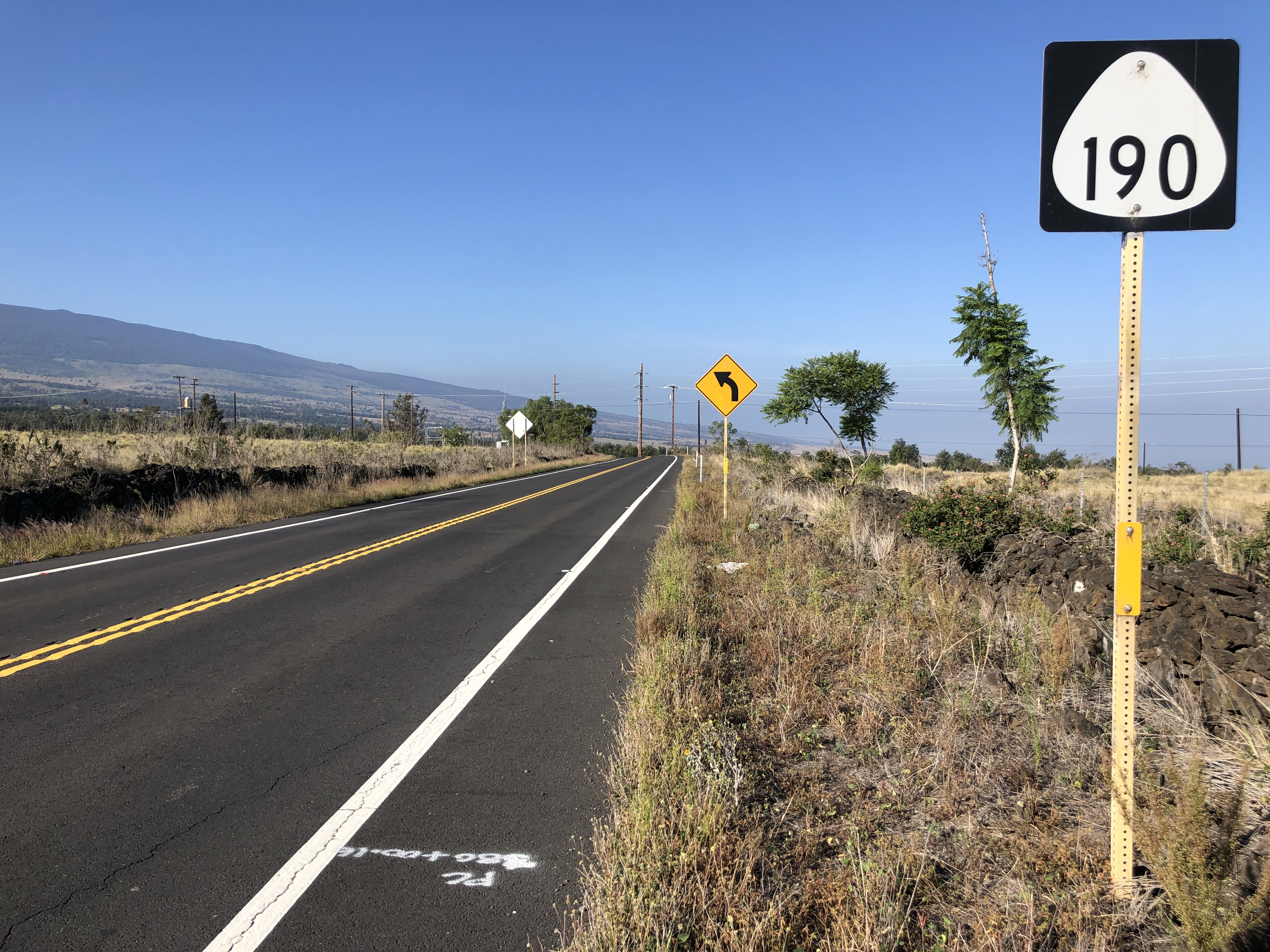
Route 190 southbound in Pu'uanahulu

The continuation of Māmalahoa Highway from the Lindsey Road (Route 19) intersection is the beginning of Route 190 with the mile 0 marker posted on the corner. This was the original Hilo-to-Kona link which served as Highway 19 until the route was reassigned in 1975 to the newly opened Queen Kaʻahumanu Highway along the coast.

The road subsequently runs past Camp Tarawa, the Parker Ranch headquarters and the Waimea-Kohala Airport before traversing the rolling pasturelands of the South Kohala District.

Few intersections are found along the next 20 miles (32.19 km). Saddle Road (Route 200) comes to its western terminus near mile 6 and Waikōloa Road ends its 12-mile (19.31 km) climb from Queen Kaʻahumanu Highway at Māmalahoa Highway's mile 11 marker. There are some sharp curves as the old road passes Puʻu Lani Ranch (mile 20) in Puʻuanahulu and the entrance to Puʻu Waʻawaʻa Forest Reserve. A long narrow strip of asphalt stretches across the windswept rangelands and lava fields covered with fountain grass.

As the road passes through a stand of eucalyptus and ʻohiʻa trees near mile 31, the upland neighborhoods of the North Kona District come into view: Kalaoa, Kona Palasades Estates, Koloko Mauka and Honokōhau. On the other side of mile 35, a traffic light at the top of Hina Lani Street provides access to a Costco store.

At a 3-way intersection, the Māmalahoa Highway turns left and becomes Route 180, while Route 190 continues straight, becoming Palani Road. Palani descends steeply towards Kailua-Kona, making many quick turns and narrow curves. Palani Road meets Queen Kaʻahumanu Highway, marking the end of the route, though Palani Road continues downhill to its junction with Kuakini Highway and Aliʻi Drive.

== Major intersections ==
=== Main route (Routes 11 and 19) ===
The entire route is in Hawaii County.

Location	mi	km	Destinations	Notes
Hilo	0.00	0.00	Route 19 (Kamehameha Avenue) / Banyan Drive – Hilo, Honokaa	Route 19 transitions to Route 11
Hilo	0.70	1.13	Kekuanaoa Street – Hilo International Airport	
Hilo	1.90	3.06	Route 2000 west (Pūʻāinakō Street)	Eastern terminus of Route 200; to Prince Kūhiō Plaza
Keaau	6.70	10.78	Route 130 south (Keaʻau Bypass Road) – Pahoa, Kalapana	Northern terminus of Route 130
Keaau	7.30	11.75	Route 139 south (Keaʻau-Pāhoa Road) – Keaau	Northern terminus of Route 139
Volcano	26.40	42.49	Route 148 north (Wright Road) – Volcano	Southern terminus of Route 148
Hawaii Volcanoes National Park	28.40	45.71	Hawaiʻi Volcanoes National Park	Access via Crater Rim Drive
Pahala	51.40	82.72	Kamahi Street (Route 15 south) – Pahala	Northern terminus of Route 15; serves Kaʻu Hospital
Pahala	52.20	84.01	Maile Street (Route 15 north)	Southern terminus of Route 15
Waiohinu	69.50	111.85	South Point Road – South Point	
Hookena Beach	101.10	162.70	Hoʻokena Beach Road (Route 10 west)	Eastern terminus of Route 10; serves Hoʻokena Beach
Keokea	103.60	166.73	Route 160 west (Keala o Keawe Road) – Puuhonua, Honaunau	Eastern terminus of Route 160
Captain Cook	110.20	177.35	Route 160 south (Nāpōʻopoʻo Road) – Kealakekua Bay	Northern terminus of Route 160; serves Nāpōʻopoʻo
Honalo	113.70	182.98	Route 180 north (Māmalahoa Highway) – Keauhou	Southern terminus of Route 180
Kahaluu-Keauhou	114.40	184.11	Kamehameha III Road (Route 185 south) – Keauhou Bay	Northern terminus of Route 185; to Aliʻi Drive
Kailua-Kona	120.40	193.77	Hualālai Road (Route 182 east) – Holualoa	Western terminus of Route 182
Kailua-Kona	121.97 99.49	196.29 160.11	Route 190 east (Palani Road) / Route 19 north (Queen Kaʻahumanu Highway) – Waimea, Airport, Kawaihae	Route 11 transitions to the makai route (Route 19); western terminus of the makua route (Route 19)
Kalaoa	97.50	156.91	Route 197 (Kealakehe Parkway) – Honokohau Harbour	Serves Kealakehe High School
Kalaoa	92.90	149.51	Keāhole Airport Road – Kona International Airport	
Kawaihae	66.90	107.67	Route 270 north – Kawaihae, Hawi	Southern terminus of Route 270; serves North Kohala
Waimea	59.00	94.95	Route 250 north – Hawi	Serves and Kahuā Ranch
Waimea	56.90	91.57	Route 190 south (Māmalahoa Highway) – Kona, Kawaihae	Northern terminus of the mauka route (Route 190)
Honokaa	42.00	67.59	Route 240 west – Honokaa, Waipio	Eastern terminus of Route 240; serves Hāmākua Coast, Waipiʻo Valley, Kukuihaele
Honomu	13.50	21.73	Route 220 west (Honomū Road) – Honomu, Akaka Falls	Eastern terminus of Route 220
Hilo	2.60	4.18	Route 200 west (Waiʻānuenue Avenue) – Downtown Hilo	No access from Route 19 northbound; eastern terminus of Route 200
Hilo	1.00	1.61	Route 11 north (Kanoelehua Avenue) / Banyan Drive – Airport, Volcano	Hawaiʻi Belt Road transitions to Route 11; Route 19 continues east
Hilo	0.00	0.00	Kahuhane Avenue / Kalanianaole Avenue east	Terminus of state maintenance
1.000 mi = 1.609 km; 1.000 km = 0.621 mi: Incomplete access; Route transition; Unopened

=== Inland route (Route 190) ===
The entire route is in Hawaii County.

Location	mi	km	Destinations	Notes
Waimea	0.00	0.00	Route 19 (Māmalahoa Highway) – Hilo, Kawaihae, North Kohala	Northern terminus at the makai route
Waimea	6.20	9.98	Route 200 east (Saddle Road)	To Mauna Kea, Mauna Loa
Palani Junction	35.30	56.81	Route 180 south (Māmalahoa Highway) – Holualoa	Northern terminus of Route 180
Kailua-Kona	38.97	62.72	Route 11 south / Route 19 north (Queen Kaʻahumanu Highway) – Airport, Kawaihae, Volcano	Eastern terminus at the makai route
1.000 mi = 1.609 km; 1.000 km = 0.621 mi: Route transition

== See also ==
- Ala Kahakai National Historic Trail

Browse numbered routes
← Route 10	→ Route 13
← Route 18	→ Route 21
← Route 160	→ Route 197
