= ʻAkaka Falls State Park =

State park in Hawaii, United States

- ʻAkaka Falls on Kolekole Stream

- Location within Hawaii
- Location: Honomu, Hawaiʻi, United States
- Coordinates: 19°51′14″N 155°9′16″W
- Governing body: Hawaii Department of Land and Natural Resources

ʻAkaka Falls State Park is a state park on Hawaiʻi Island, in the U.S. state of Hawaii. The park is about 11 miles (18 km) north of Hilo, west of Honomū off the Hawaii Belt Road (Route 19) at the end of Hawaii Route 220. It includes its namesake ʻAkaka Falls, a 442-foot (135 m) tall waterfall. ʻAkaka is named after Chief 'Akaka-o-ka-nī'au-oi'o-i-ka-wao, grandson of Kūlanikapele and Kīakalohia. The accessible portion of the park lies high on the right shoulder of the deep gorge into which the waterfall plunges, and the falls can be viewed from several points along a loop trail through the park. Also visible from this trail is Kahūnā Falls, a 300-foot (91 m) tall waterfall, and several smaller cascades.

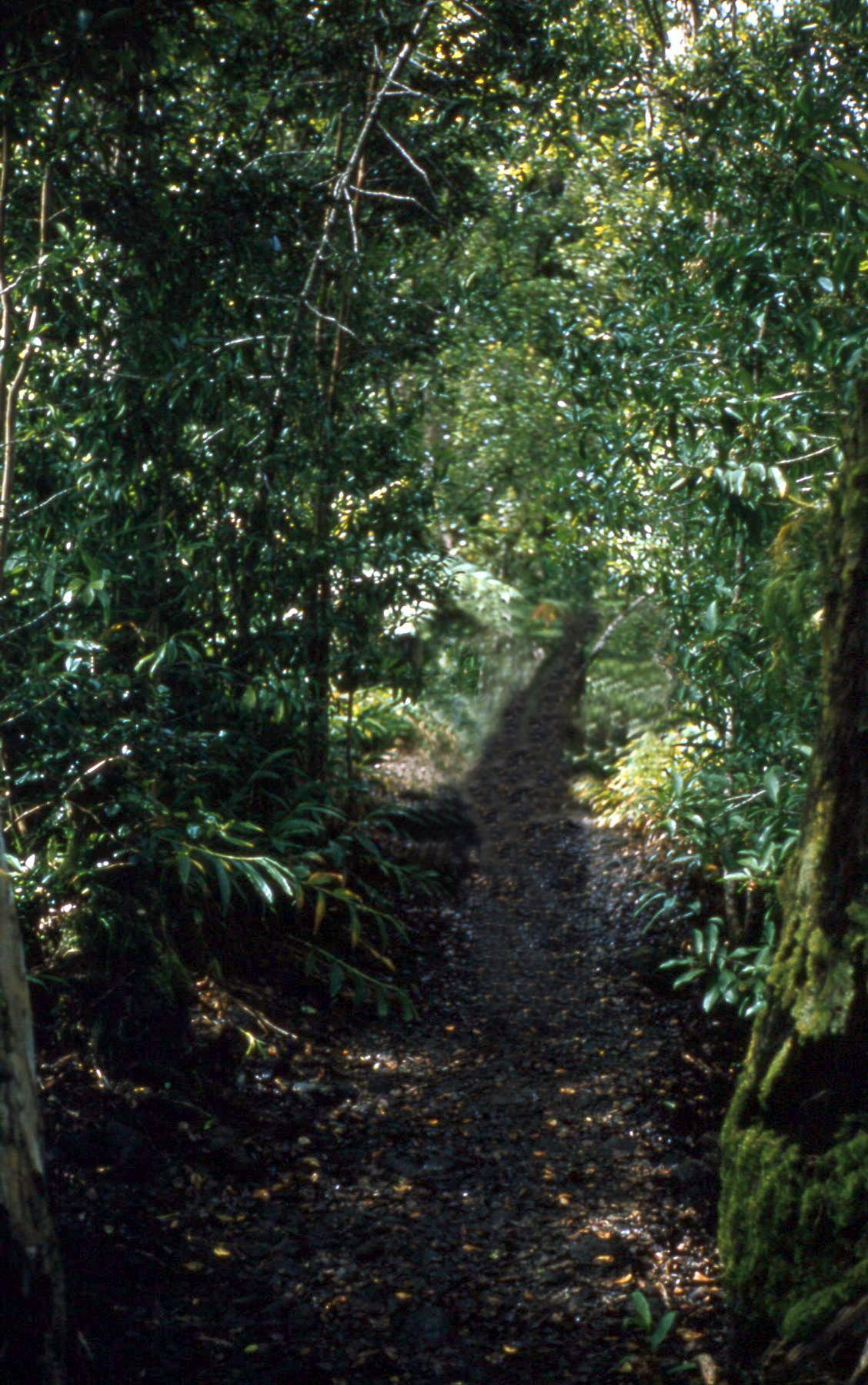
Trail in park, 1959

Local folklore describes a stone here called Pōhaku a Pele that, when struck by a branch of lehua ʻāpane, will call the sky to darken and rain to fall. Lehua ʻāpane or ʻōhiʻa ʻāpane is an ʻōhiʻa tree (Metrosideros polymorpha) with dark red blossoms.

ʻAkaka Falls is located on Kolekole Stream. A large stone in the stream about 70 feet (21 m) upstream of the falls is called Pōhaku o Kāloa.

Akaka Falls video

== Wildlife ==
The ʻoʻopu ʻalamoʻo is an endemic Hawaiian species of goby fish that spawns in stream above the waterfall, but matures in the sea. These fish have a suction disk on their bellies that allows them to cling to the wet rocks behind and adjacent to the waterfall. Using this disk, they climb back up to the stream when it is time to spawn. A shrimp called the ʻōpaekalaʻole has also evolved to climb ʻAkaka Falls and live in Kolekole Stream.

== See also ==
- List of waterfalls
- List of Hawaii waterfalls
- List of Hawaii state parks
- Umauma Falls
- Rainbow Falls
