= Umauma Falls =

Coordinates: 19°54′18″N 155°8′53″W

Viewed from a standard observation point.

The Umauma Falls are located on the Umauma River on the Big Island of Hawaii, approximately 16 miles (26 km) north of Hilo.

They are unique in Hawaii as being a series of three waterfalls in close proximity. They are easily viewed from an overlook located on private botanical garden property accessible for a fee. The overlook was constructed in 1996 by Walter L. Wagner who was developing the World Botanical Gardens with the waterfalls overlook as part of the tourist attraction. Subsequently, the waterfall overlook ownership was transferred circa 2008, and access to the overlook is now through Umauma Experience (also a botanical garden), and not through World Botanical Gardens.

== Formation and history ==
The Umauma Falls and River has been forming since the Mauna Kea volcano on which flank it flows slowly emerged from the sea beginning millions of years ago. During this period, the volcano formed alternating layers of volcanic ash or solidified lava, forming distinct layers that can erode at different rates. Eventually, Mauna Kea reached its current height, and entered a 'final phase' of primarily cinder cone eruptions from the flanks of Mauna Kea, which also deposited a 10-meter thick layer of ash, which is now the fertile soil presently found on the relatively level or gentle-slope portions. Due to the flow of the trade-winds, the southern regions of the eastern flank of Mauna Kea have higher rainfalls than the northern regions. The Umauma River is at the dividing line between heavy rains to the south, and lighter rains to the north. It is the most northernly river to have a continuous flow and not dry up during the dry season.

Rainfall can at times be intense, and two feet of rain in a few hours has been recorded in historic times, and presumably even heavier rains can occur, and the further up-slope, the more intense the rainfall. Such rainfalls can swell the rivers to huge flows, moving boulders and rocks downstream.

As the boulders tumble down slope, they will tend to cause erosion wherever they hit, and this forms small waterfalls. Over time, as boulders fall over the waterfall, they erode deeply at the base of the waterfall, forming a plunge pool. During normal low flows, these make for excellent swimming holes, and are notable features of all the waterfalls on Mauna Kea.

Surroundings

Eventually, the face of a waterfall will become undermined by the plunge-pool, and will cave into the pool, filling it with debris. Subsequently, the debris is removed by additional heavy rainfalls, leaving a new plunge-pool relatively free of debris. The waterfall, however, has moved up-slope by a few feet. Over time, the waterfalls slowly recede upslope. If a waterfall hits a stronger region that resists erosion, lower level waterfalls can 'catch-up' and two waterfalls merge into one deeper waterfall. This process is causing the Umauma Falls to slowly move upslope over geologic time, though we can see the plunge-pools at the bases of the three Umauma Falls (Note: there are many other waterfalls on the Umauma River, also slowly moving upslope over geologic time). We can see what Umauma Falls might look like in the far distant future by visiting the neighboring river (KoleKole) just to the south of the Umauma River, which has a very large single waterfall, known as Akaka Falls, formed in just such a manner in the distant geologic past. It is further upslope than the Umauma Falls, and it is in a much heavier rainfall region.

The Umauma Falls were accessible for viewing until relatively recently only by walking upslope along the river bed. In 1995 the founder of the World Botanical Gardens, while exploring the Umauma River gulch edge to find a good viewing point, discovered the current overlook, which had been hidden from view by extensive growth of wild guava trees and sugarcane. Soon thereafter, he carved the current overlook by removing the overgrown agricultural berm along the gulch edge and its guava trees, replacing it with a concrete platform, retaining walls, and steel railing, which is its present configuration.

== See also ==
- List of waterfalls
- List of Hawaii waterfalls
- List of Hawaii state parks
- Akaka Falls
- Rainbow Falls
