= Paʻauilo, Hawaii =

Census-designated place in Hawaii, U.S.

Paʻauilo
- Census-designated place
- Location in Hawaiʻi County and the state of Hawaiʻi
- Coordinates: 20°2′38″N 155°22′13″W
- Country: United States
- State: Hawaiʻi
- County: Hawaiʻi

Area
  - Total: 1.25 sq mi (3.23 km^{2})
  - Land: 1.20 sq mi (3.11 km^{2})
  - Water: 0.046 sq mi (0.12 km^{2})
- Elevation: 712 ft (217 m)

Population (2020)
  - Total: 618
  - Density: 514.8/sq mi (198.77/km^{2})
- Time zone: UTC-10 (Hawaii-Aleutian)
- ZIP code: 96776
- Area code: 808
- FIPS code: 15-59300
- GNIS feature ID: 0362922

Paʻauilo (English: /paʊˈiloʊ/) is a census-designated place (CDP) in Hawaiʻi County, Hawaii, United States. The population was 618 at the 2020 census.

== Geography ==
Paʻauilo is located on the northeast side of the island of Hawaiʻi at 20°2′38″N 155°22′13″W (20.043769, -155.370323). Hawaii Route 19 passes through the community, leading southeast 34 miles (55 km) to Hilo and west 21 miles (34 km) to Waimea.

According to the United States Census Bureau, the CDP has a total area of 1.1 square miles (2.8 km^{2}), of which 1.0 square mile (2.7 km^{2}) is land and 0.0 square miles (0.1 km^{2}), or 4.14%, is water.

== Demographics ==
Historical population
Census	Pop.	Note	%±
2020	618		—
U.S. Decennial Census

As of the census of 2000, there were 571 people, 191 households, and 141 families residing in the CDP. The population density was 496.3 inhabitants per square mile (191.6/km^{2}). There were 198 housing units at an average density of 172.1 per square mile (66.4/km^{2}). The racial makeup of the CDP was 15.06% White, 0.18% African American, 0.70% Native American, 41.68% Asian, 5.60% Pacific Islander, 0.88% from other races, and 35.90% from two or more races. Hispanic or Latino of any race were 13.49% of the population.

There were 191 households, out of which 31.4% had children under the age of 18 living with them, 53.4% were married couples living together, 14.1% had a female householder with no husband present, and 25.7% were non-families. 20.9% of all households were made up of individuals, and 10.5% had someone living alone who was 65 years of age or older. The average household size was 2.99 and the average family size was 3.50.

In the CDP the population was spread out, with 28.7% under the age of 18, 7.9% from 18 to 24, 23.5% from 25 to 44, 23.5% from 45 to 64, and 16.5% who were 65 years of age or older. The median age was 37 years. For every 100 females, there were 101.8 males. For every 100 females age 18 and over, there were 105.6 males.

The median income for a household in the CDP was $34,659, and the median income for a family was $34,792. Males had a median income of $23,750 versus $25,000 for females. The per capita income for the CDP was $13,477. About 11.3% of families and 12.3% of the population were below the poverty line, including 16.7% of those under age 18 and 8.5% of those age 65 or over.

== See also ==
- List of places in Hawaii
