= Scouting in Hawaii =

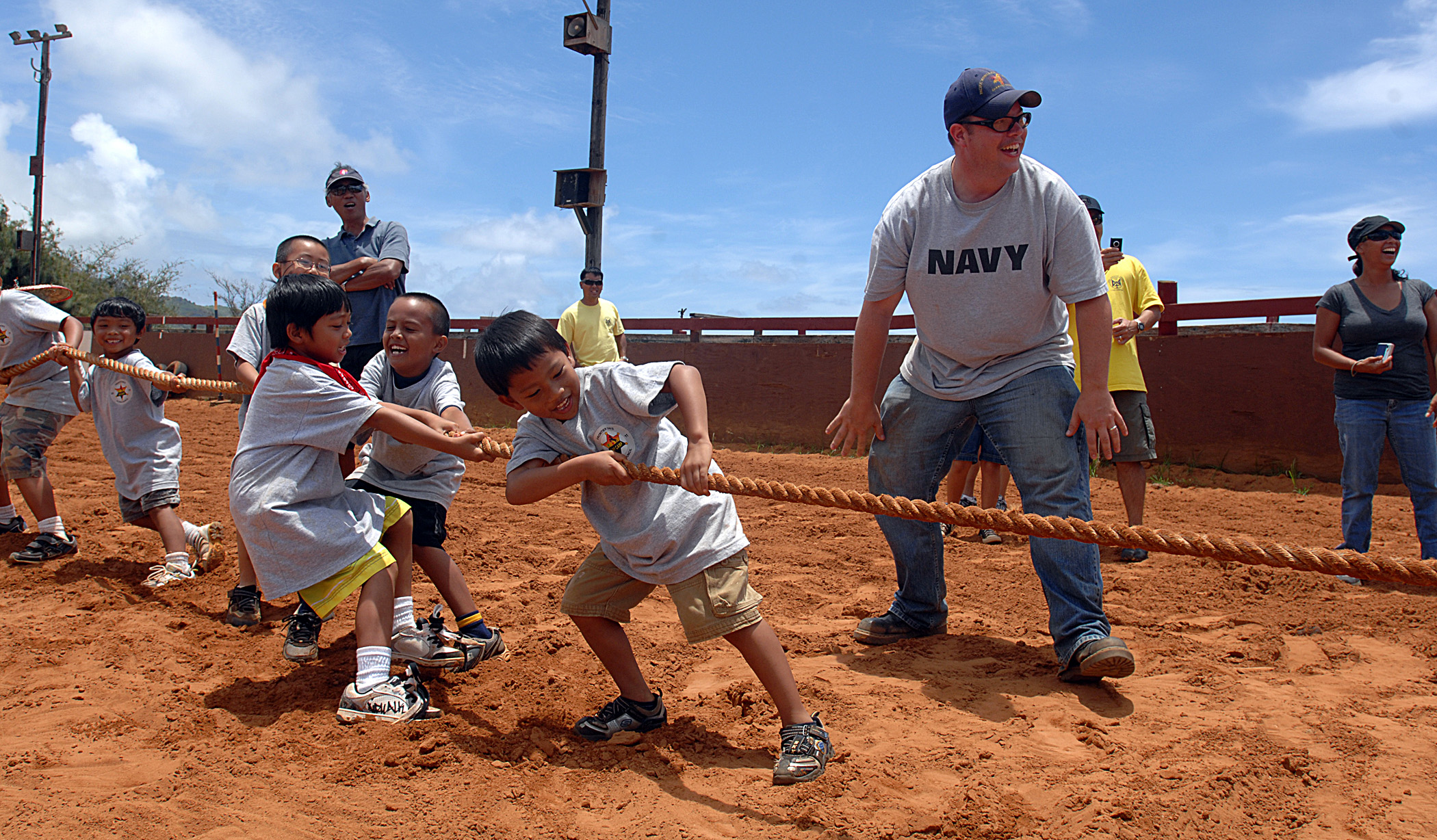
- Cub Scouts during a tug-of-war

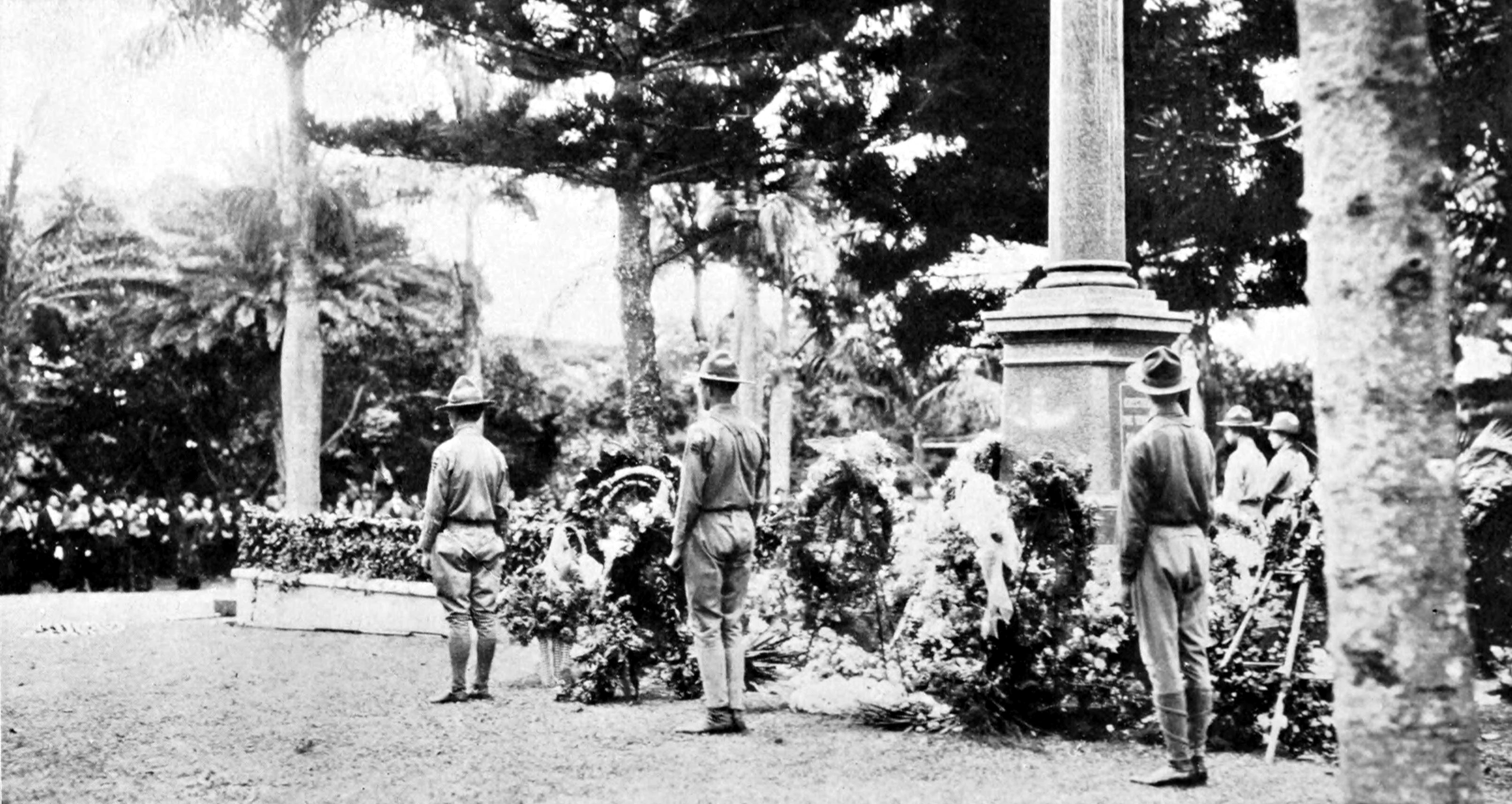
- Liliuokalani Boy Scout Troop on Guard at Royal Mausoleum

Scouting in Hawaii began in the 1900s. It serves thousands of youth in programs that suit the environment in which they live.

== Early history prior to statehood (1908-1960) ==
The first troop in the islands, appropriately numbered Troop 1, was founded by a British Scouter just recently relocated, and chartered to Kawaiahaʻo Church. One Saturday, former Queen Liliʻuokalani was driven past Kapiʻolani Park in Honolulu, and noticed this troop going through Scouting drills. She stopped and enquired what manner of military play this was, and the Scouts eagerly explained the concept of Scouting to her. On a following Saturday a month later, the Queen reappeared, and presented to the troop a Hawaiian flag. Emblazoned upon the red-white-and-blue stripes were the Hawaiian royal crest and the lettering in gold The Queen's Own Troop, which she had labored at herself. As the Scoutmaster was an Englishman, in their tradition of naming rather than numbering troops, the appellation stuck. The unit claiming longest continuous charter is Troop 1.

Troop 5 up until the early 1980s held the distinction of the longest continuously chartered unit in Hawaii. It was Troop 5 that was known as "The Queen's Own Troop" that received the flag which was made by her own hands. The flag was held by the Liliuokalani Trust until it was given to the Aloha Council BSA by a previous Assistant Scoutmaster, David Jeong of Troop 5. The flag was given as part of the Centennial Celebration of Scouting in 2010. One of Troop 5's Scoutmasters, "Kimo" James Austin Wilder was also a founder of the Sea Scout program.

David McHattie Forbes was the founder of Scouting in Waimea in the early 1900s.

In 1946, Scouts helped re-introduce the endangered nene into the Haleakala National Park by carrying young birds into the Haleakala Crater in their backpacks.

The Honolulu Council (#104) was founded in 1914, and became the Honolulu County Council in 1924. In 1957, the council became the Aloha Council.^{[a]}

== History since statehood ==
In 1972, the third Hawaiian council, Kilauea Council (#103) based in Hilo (founded in 1922) merged with the Aloha Council.^{[a]}

=== Maui County Council ===
Maui County Council
- Maui County Council
- Owner: Scouting America, Aloha Council
- Headquarters: Wailuku, Maui
- Country: United States
- Founded: 1917
- Website www.mauibsa.org

Maui County Council was founded in 1917,^{[a]} and until 2019, was one of the very few councils that have not undergone a name change or merger in its entire history. With headquarters in Wailuku, Maui, the council served the islands of Moloka'i, Lāna'i and Maui. In 2019, the Maui County Council merged with the Aloha Council.

==== Camps ====
- Camp Maluhia

==== Order of the Arrow ====
Maluhia Lodge 554
- Affiliation: Order of the Arrow
- Website www.mauibsa.org/order-of-the-arrow/70229

Maluhia Lodge 554, chartered in 1962, was made up of Arrowmen from the Maui County Council (Maui, Lāna'i, Moloka'i). The lodge totem was a Hawaiian warrior wearing an ipu (gourd) mask that represents the Hawaiian god Lono. Given that the word "maluhia" in Hawaiian means "peace", it was fitting that Lono, the Hawaiian god of peace, was represented in the lodgeʻs totem. When the Maui County Council and the Aloha Council merged in 2019, Maluhia Lodge was absorbed in Nā Mokupuni o Lawelawe Lodge and became Nā Koa Chapter.

== Scouting in Hawaii today ==
There is only one Scouting America, Aloha Council (BSA) local council in Hawaii. As of February 2025, the organization is now known as Scouting America, Aloha Council.

=== Aloha Council ===
Aloha Council

- West to east, the islands are Palau, Guam, Northern Mariana Islands, Federated States of Micronesia, Marshall Islands, American Samoa, Hawaii
- Owner: Scouting America, Aloha Council
- Headquarters: Honolulu
- Country: United States
- Website scoutinghawaii.org

Scouting America, Aloha Council is headquartered in Honolulu, and supports Scouting units around the Pacific Basin. The Aloha Council encompasses Hawaii, Guam, American Samoa, the Northern Marianas, the Marshall Islands, Micronesia and Palau.

In 2004, Scouts attended local council camps on American Samoa, Hawaii's Big Island, Guam, Kauai and Oahu. Aloha Council Pacific Basin District outreach efforts in the Pacific continue to grow with over 835 Scouts and 240 Cub Scouts attending camps on Chuuk, Pohnpei, Kosrae, Saipan, Kwajalein, Rongelap, Majuro, Yap and Palau.

In 2018, the 45-year-old council badge was changed to include a green sea turtle and names the three primary locations serviced, "Hawaiʻi - American Samoa - Guam".

==== Camps ====
- Camp Pupukea
- Camp Maluhia
- Camp Alan Faye (Closed in 2026)
- Camp Honokaia (Sold in 2026)

==== Order of the Arrow ====
The Nā Mokupuni O Lawelawe Lodge 567, chartered in 1973, serves 100 Arrowmen as of 2021. The lodge totem is a pueo (Hawaiian owl), the lodge symbol is a Hawaiian outrigger canoe, and the name translates to "Islands of Service" in the Hawaiian language. In 1973, Kamehameha Lodge 454 (chartered in 1951 to the Kilauea Council in Hilo) and Achsin Lodge 565 (chartered in 1970 to the Chamorro Council on Guam) merged with Pupukea Lodge 557 (chartered in 1962, the original Aloha Council lodge) to form the larger lodge. In 2019 the Maluhia Lodge 554 ( chartered in 1962 to the Maui County Council in Wailuku) which was merged into the Aloha Council

==== Hawaiiana Award ====
Hawaiiana Award
- Medal and badge
- Awarded for: Hawaiian culture

The Hawaiiana Award is offered by the Aloha Council and is dedicated to the perpetuation of the skills crafts and legends of old Hawaii. The award was established in 1973 and has been offered continuously by the Aloha Council to its members and Scouts visiting the Hawaiian islands.

The requirements for Hawaiiana include the composition of a 750-word essay on the pre-European history of the Hawaiian people; the collection of at least five representative leaves or flowers of native fauna from four specific zones of the island; the development of a sketchbook detailing five native birds; the recitation of the Scout Oath, Law, Motto and Slogan in Hawaiian and offer its English translation; the recitation of twenty five Hawaiian place names and their meanings; the recitation of 25 common Hawaiian terms and their meanings; participation in a series of Hawaiian games; participation in six methods of Hawaiian cooking; preparation of traditional foods without cooking; the demonstration of a Hawaiian method of fishing; the construction and demonstration of a number of Hawaiian implements; the oral recitation of names and facts surrounding five famous Hawaiians from the years before 1779; the demonstration of two forms of hula and accompanying chants; the conduct of a Hawaiian play; visitation to at least two historical sites and the completion of a report detailing the visit.

These broad and comprehensive requirements are detailed in the 168 page guidebook published by the Aloha Council and available at the Council offices. The Hawaiiana award itself is in the form of a base metal medal with polished highlights suspended from a red and gold ribbon, featuring a poi pounding stone with a flaming torch in front. There is also a corresponding 3" embroidered patch that may be worn on the right pocket of the Scout shirt.

== Girl Scouting in Hawaii ==
Girl Scouts of Hawai'i
- Map of Girl Scout Council of Hawaii

Girl Scouting started in Hawaii in 1917 with two troops in Oahu. Troop 1 at the Kamehameha School for Girls completed their paperwork first, but Troop 2 in Kaka‘ako asked for the sponsorship of Lili'uokalani, the last monarch of Hawaii, and were promised her own flag that was given after her death. The Oahu council was established in 1918 and chartered in 1919. Other islands followed until Kauai had its first troop in 1936. In 1963 the Girl Scout Council of Oahu expanded to include all of Hawaii as well as Wake and Midway and was renamed Girl Scout Council of the Pacific. Wake and Midway were later dropped and in 1990 the council was renamed Girl Scout Council of Hawaii.

=== Girl Scouts of Hawai'i ===
Girl Scouts of Hawai'i
- Girl Scouts of Hawai'i
- Owner: Girl Scouts of the USA
- Headquarters: Honolulu
- Country: United States
- Website gshawaii.org

The Girl Scouts of Hawai'i has about 5,500 girl and adult members.

==== Service centers ====
- Wailuku, Maui
- Līhuʻe, Kauaʻi
- Keaʻau, Hawaii
- Kailua-Kona, Hawaii

==== Camps ====
- Camp Kilohana is 6 acres (24,000 m^{2}) on Hawaii and acquired in 1954.
- Camp Paumalu is 135 acres (0.55 km^{2}) on the North Shore of Oahu. It was given to the Girl Scouts by the Hawaiian Pineapple Company in 1951.
- Camp Piʻiholo is 14 acres (57,000 m^{2}) on Maui near Piʻiholo mountain donated in 1962 by Dwight H. Baldwin and Virginia Wellington Wells.

== Scouting in American Samoa ==
There are USA Girl Scouts Overseas in Pago Pago, serviced by way of USAGSO headquarters in New York City.

== Scouting in Guam ==
Guam has had BSA Scouting for decades, as part of the Aloha Council Chamorro District. Prior to the early 1970s, a separate Chamorro Council serviced the island. In addition, there are Girl Scouts of the USA Overseas on Guam, serviced by Guam Girl Scout Council in Hagåtña.

== Scouting in the Marshall Islands ==
The Marshall Islands are developing BSA Scouting as part of the Aloha Council Pacific Basin District. In addition, there are Girl Scouts of the USA Overseas in Ebeye, Kwajalein, and Majuro, serviced by way of USAGSO headquarters in New York.

== Scouting in the Northern Mariana Islands ==
The Northern Mariana Islands have had BSA Scouting for decades, as part of the Aloha Council Pacific Basin District. In addition, there are USA Girl Scouts Overseas in Rota, Tinian, and Gregorio T. Camacho Elementary School on Saipan, serviced by way of USAGSO headquarters in New York.

== Scouting in Palau ==
Palau is developing BSA Scouting as part of the Aloha Council Pacific Basin District. In addition, there are USA Girl Scouts Overseas in Koror, serviced by way of USAGSO headquarters in New York.

== Scouting in other Pacific islands ==
Aloha Council Scouting has also existed at various times on other Pacific remote island areas, Johnston, Wake, Kingman, Midway, and Palmyra islands.
