= David McHattie Forbes =

Scottish botanist, ethnologist, sugar plantation manager and explorer (1863–1937)

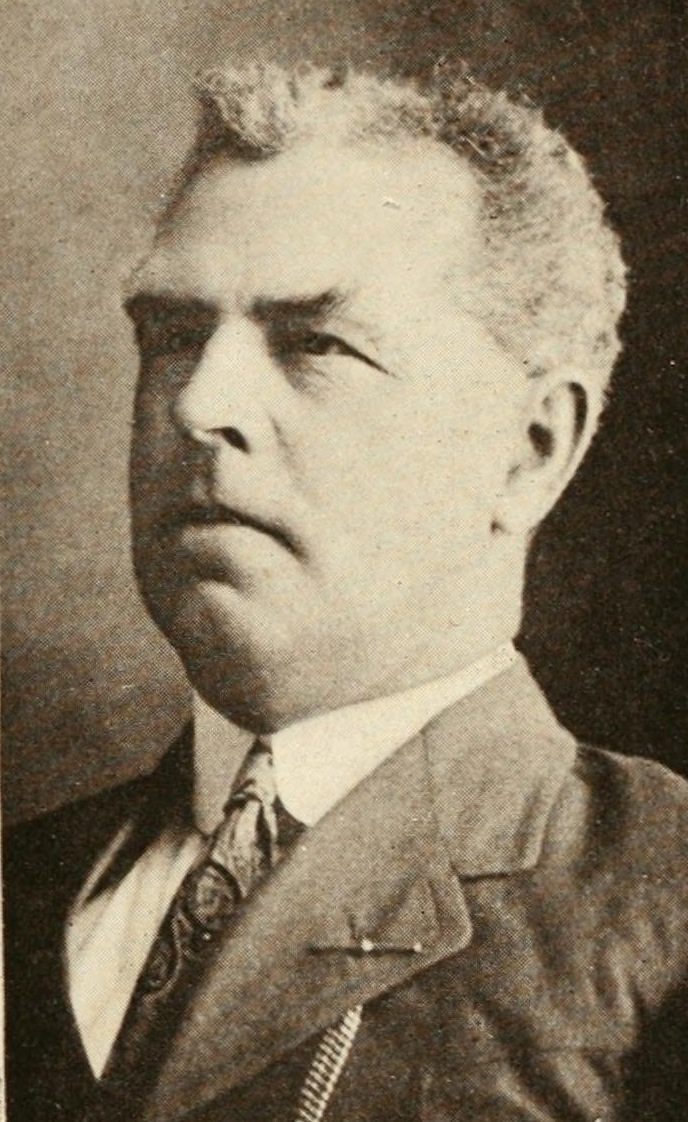
- Born: 21 July 1863; Whitemire, Scotland
- Died: 23 March 1937 (age 73); Hilo, Hawaii
- Education: Common and Night Schools in Scotland
- Occupations: Botanist, Collector, South Kohala District Forester and Magistrate of Waimea, Hawaii
- Spouse: Catherine Lougher
- Children: Blodwyn, David Merlyn, Allister, Dyfrig, Mary Elizabeth
- Parent(s): Alexander Forbes, Mary McHattie

David McHattie Forbes (21 July 1863 – 23 March 1937) was a Scottish botanist, ethnologist, sugarcane plantation manager and explorer on the island of Hawai'i. He practised forestry, agronomy, and horticulture and served as the first district forester of South Kohala in 1905, and twenty years later was appointed a judge in Waimea.

In 1905, he was the discoverer, with two colleagues, of the greatest collection of Polynesian artefacts ever found. The location of the find became known as Forbes Cave and his family preserved his third of the found objects for half a century until they donated them to the Volcanoes National Park in 1956. The Forbes Collection was on public view for 34 years until 1990, when NAGPRA legislation was passed and each item was evaluated. They were found to be priceless cultural artefacts but also to be subject to repatriation and they were removed permanently from public viewing. The other two-thirds of the found objects were sold to the Bishop Museum by Forbes's two expedition partners: Wilhelm Wagener and Friedrich Haehnisch.

== Early years ==
Born in Scotland, the son of Alexander and Mary (McHattie) Forbes, he was educated in the local schools.

== Career ==
He began working in the private estate nurseries of Moray, Scotland, in 1879 and later in the forests of the same estate. In 1882, he worked in the nurseries of Dixon & Co., Edinburgh. In 1883 he became the Foreman Forester for the estate of Fletcher's Saltoun Hall, the seat of the oldest and largest private library in Scotland.

In 1887, at the behest of William H. Purvis, David Forbes travelled to Kukuihaele near Waipio Valley, Hawaii, via Cape Horn, to manage an experiment in cinchona cultivation above the sugar line. Purvis, who had already introduced the macadamia nut from Australia, recognised the potential benefits of finding a species of tree that would thrive in the land above the sugarcane, above 1500 feet, called the sugar line. The bark of the cinchona tree imported from Ceylon had a promising yield ratio between bark and quinine. When Purvis's plantation was transferred to the Pacific Sugar Mill Company, in which Samuel Parker invested in 1879, D. M. Forbes succeeded C. Von Mengersen as manager, running the Pacific Sugar Mill from 1893 to 1907.

Forbes returned to Scotland in 1910 but did not remain. By 1912, he was back in Hawaii, in Waiakea, in Hilo, where he took the position of manager of the Waiakea Mill Company of Hilo. Finally, he settled in Waimea. In 1929, he was appointed to the rank of District Magistrate, South Kohala, and was reappointed in 1932. He was also the founder of Scouting in Waimea. He died, in Hilo, in 1937.

== Affiliations ==
- Member, Hamakua Road Board;
- Hawaii School Commissioner, appointed two terms for the Public Instruction Commission from 1922 to 1925
- 1st Lieutenant in the army of Provisional Government of Hawaii
- 32° Mason (BPOE)
- Member of the Royal Arboricultural Society of Scotland.

== Family ==
He married Catherine Lougher at Waiakea, Hilo, on 7 August 1895. They had five children, Blodwyn, Merlyn, Allister, Dyfrig and Elizabeth.

== Legacy ==
Kukuihaele is the site of the original Hawaiian Island stand of cinchona trees, from which quinine is made. They were planted by David McHattie Forbes in 1887 on the forest lands of the Pacific Sugar Mill Company, one patch of approximately 3 acres (1.2 ha) extent at an elevation of 2,000 feet (610 m), the other patch of 10 to 12 acres (4.9 ha) is at 2,200 feet (670 m) elevation. Despite the best available location, ample drainage and good soil, the cinchona trees did not grow as well as most exotic plants introduced from a warm climate. Their value became so low compared to the price of labour that the attempt was abandoned in 1905.

A Banyan Tree still stands in David McHattie Forbes honour at Banyan Drive in Hilo, Hawaii, known as the "Hilo Walk of Fame." Next to Forbes, visitors will find such names as Amelia Earhart, Babe Ruth, and Franklin Delano Roosevelt on plaques affixed to the trees.

Forbes originated the "Waimea Vegetable and Flower Show" which developed under his leadership into the principal annual horticultural show in West Hawaii.

Forbes planted some camphorwood seedlings in the grounds of the manager's house of the Pacific Sugar Mill Company in the 1880s. Half a century later he used the fragrant wood of these same trees to carve the altar for the Imiola Church in Waimea. Carving of the altar was completed after his death by his son David Merlyn Lougher Forbes.

He introduced the Jack Fruit tree to Hawaii.
