= Waiākea-Uka =

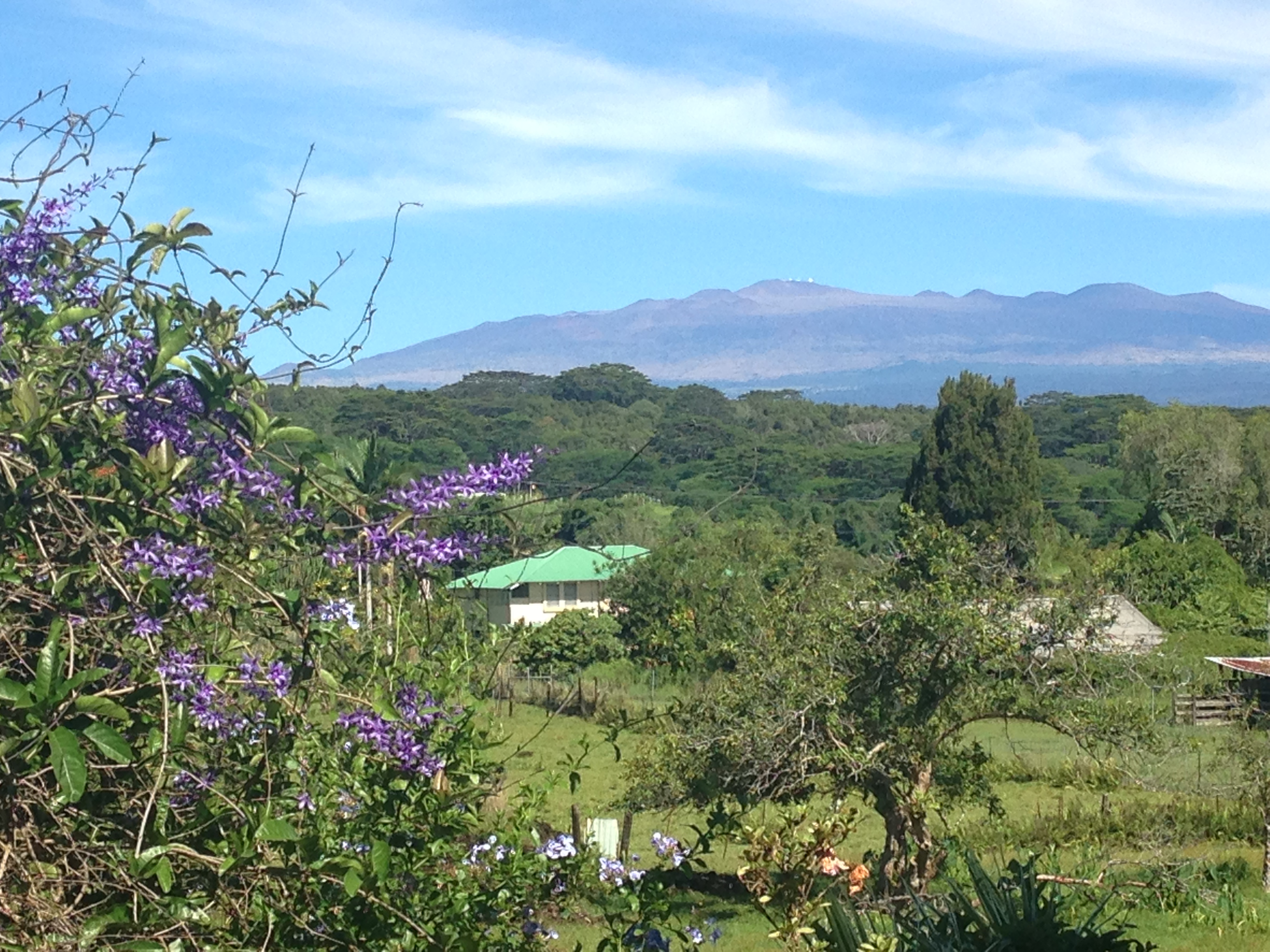
Cattle farm and local flowers grown in Waiakea-Uka (looking towards Mauna Kea)

Waiākea-Uka (IPA:/'waj.ə.kei.ə.'u.kə/) is an ancient subdivision (ahupuaʻa) in the Hilo District of the Big Island of Hawaiʻi, located mauka (mountain-side) of the Waiākea ahupua'a; its location is on the lower flanks of the volcano Mauna Loa. Because of this, one meaning of the name 'Waiākea-Uka' can be translated from 'Olelo Hawai'i as '(the) mountain-side (of) Waiākea'. Many ahupua'a have this -uka appellation, as the directions 'mountain-side' and 'sea-side' (makai) are the two best ways of orienting something in space on any of the islands.

== History ==
Waiākea-Uka marks the most mauka portion of human settlement in the Hilo district. Waiākea-Uka has many expensive houses, including a Swiss-style chateau. The area is home to many traditional agricultural hawaiian-style homes. As the area is mauka of Hilo Bay, there is no threat of tsunami; earthquakes are always a possibility anywhere on the island, and the area is currently termed lava zone 3. The most recent lava flows were in 1935, 1942 and 1984, with the 1984 coming quite close to the upper reaches of the area. Driving northwest on the Saddle Road, about 15 miles outside of the Hilo extension, one can see the vast lava fields of the 1881, 1935 and 1942 lava flows. This same lava flow stopped one half mile east of the upper Kaumana area

== Current ==
Recently, there has been much growth in the agriculture of the area. Some cattle, goat and dairy farms are located in Waiākea-Uka, as well as a state forest reserve (Upper Waiākea Forest Reserve).

Waiākea-Uka is served by four schools located in the Waiākea area: Waiakeawaena Elementary School, Waiakea Elementary School, Waiakea Intermediate School, and Waiakea High School. The Waiākea-Uka region is home to a million-dollar park and indoor gym. The area also highlights a variety of traditional stone/rock wall and palm grove cutting techniques; many homes have kept these walls up and a variety of linearly-cut coconut palm groves can be seen as home line designations.

The Hele-On bus number 6 runs from Hilo town to Waiākea-Uka, and the bus number 7 runs from Waiākea-Uka to Hilo town.

== Climate and Topography ==
The topography of the entire area is quite varied; The main roads (Hoaka Road, 'Aina'ola Drive, Kawailani Street) are laid over the same active rift zones that created the region over the past 100 years. Further earthquake activity and land settling has created a view of the Hilo region, including Hilo bay, as well as Mauna Kea. Waiākea Stream flows from the slopes of Mauna Loa at 19°37′57″N 155°10′41″W into Waiākea Pond at an elevation of only 10 feet (3.0 m) at 19°42′53″N 155°4′35″W.

As Waiakea-Uka is on the lower flanks of Mauna Loa, the area is known in for its rainfall; in August 2013, the Waiakea-Uka NWS rain gauge showed 83.96 inches of accumulated rain, while the Hilo International Airport rain gauge only registered 57.97 inches for the same length of time; though these two rain gauges are about 6 miles apart, this represents a difference of 25.99 inches, or about the average yearly rainfall of the state of Kansas. As a result, Papaya, Guava, Citrus and Plumeria are grown by many residents. In recent years, plums and peaches can be seen around many of the area's fields.

== Gallery ==
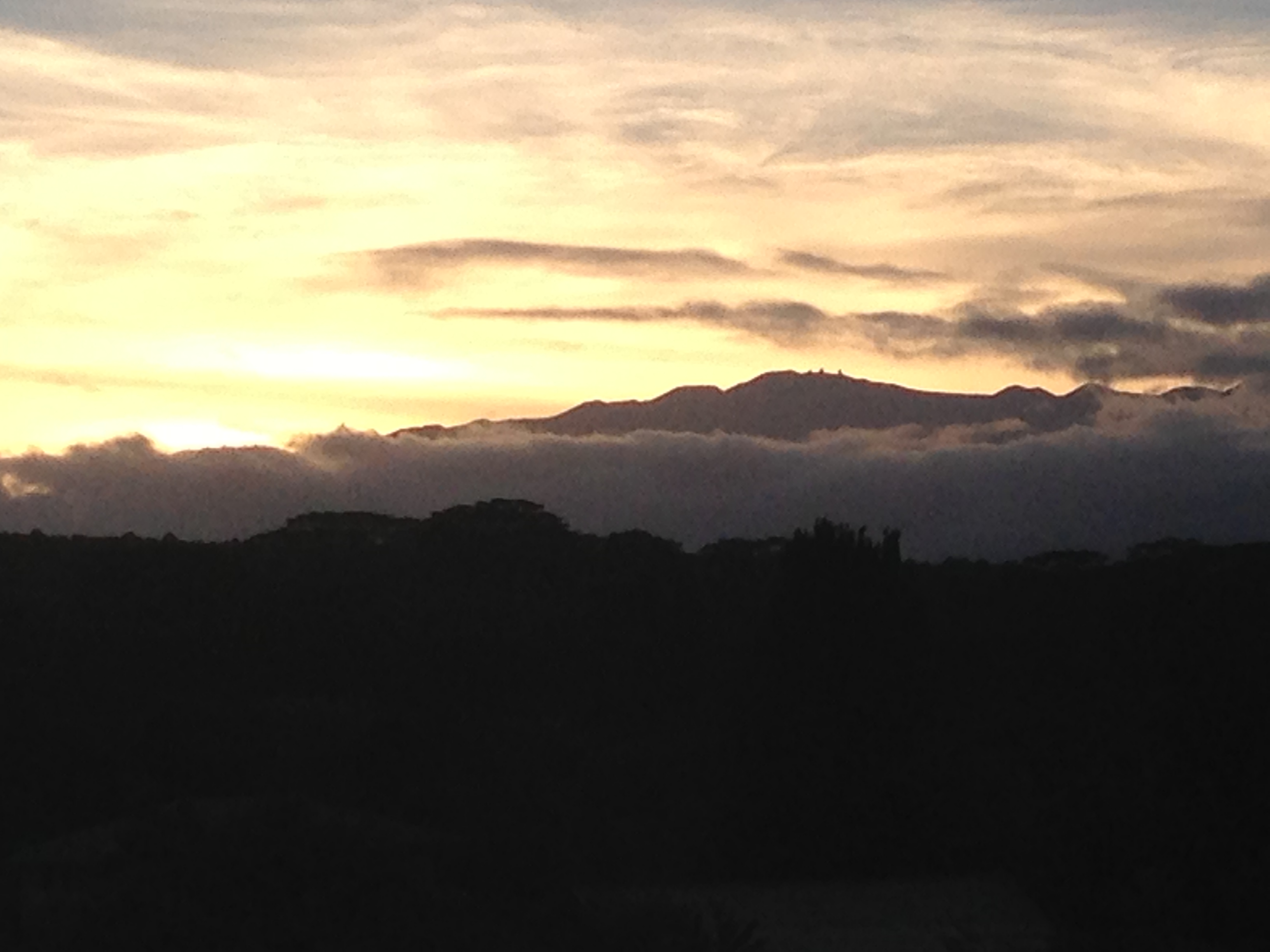
Sunset behind Mauna Kea from Hoaka Road in Waiakea-Uka.

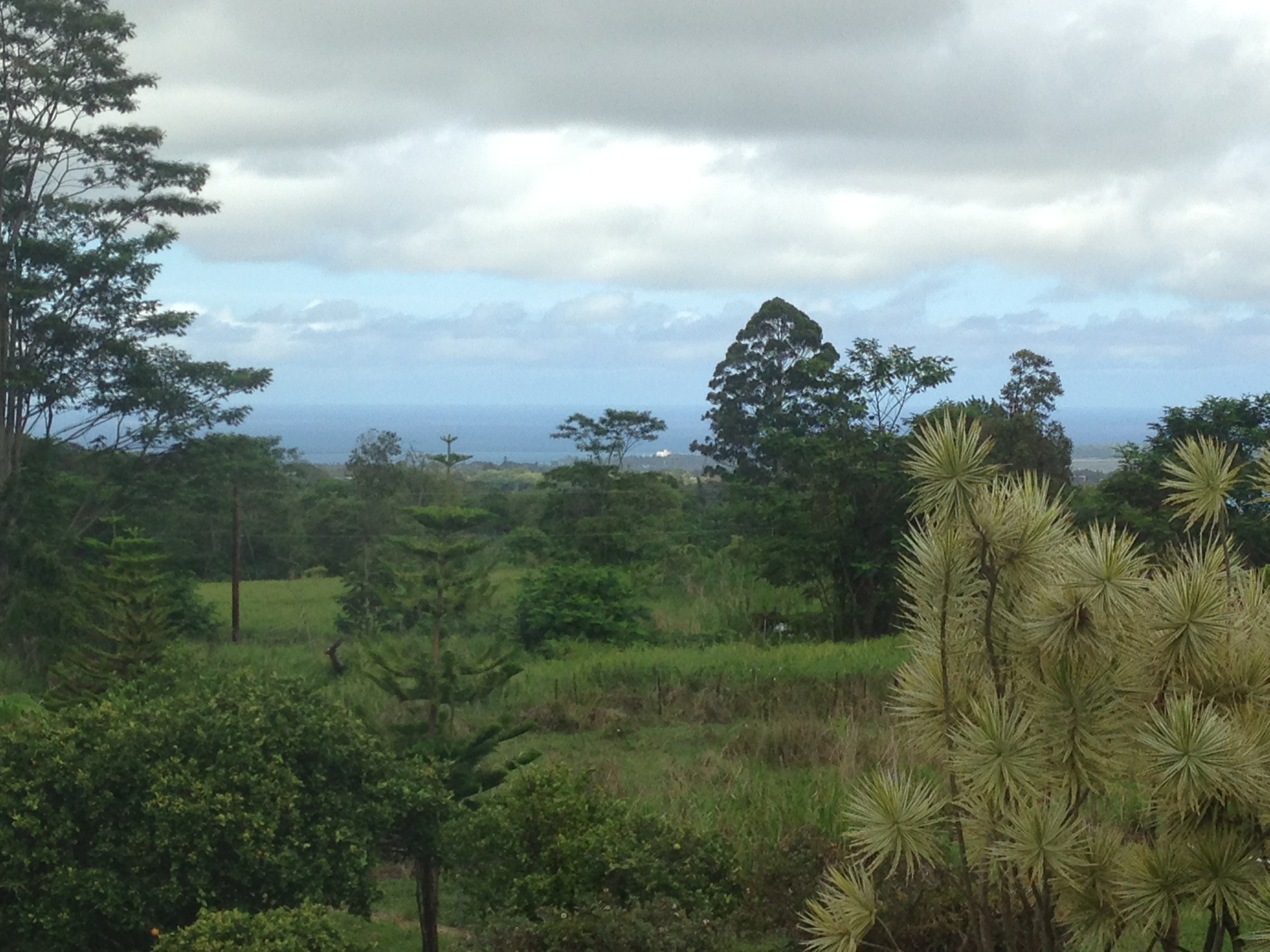
Hilo Bay from Hoaka Road in Waiakea-Uka.

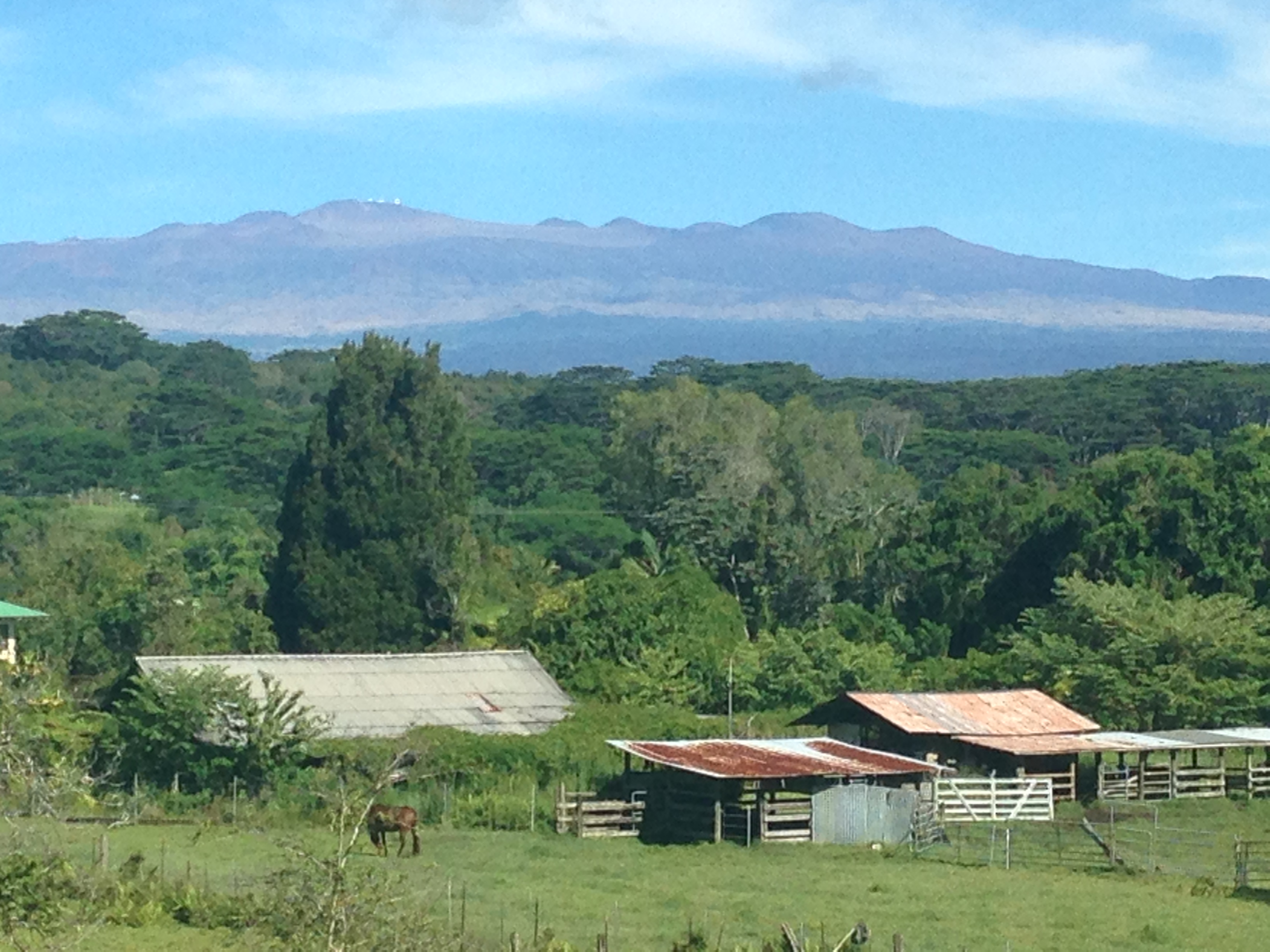
Mauna Kea from Hoaka Road in Waiakea-Uka.
