= Kukuihaele, Hawaii =

Census-designated place in Hawaii, U.S.

Kukuihaele
- Census-designated place
- Location in Hawaii County and the state of Hawaii
- Coordinates: 20°7′10″N 155°34′16″W
- Country: United States
- State: Hawaii
- County: Hawaiʻi

Area
  - Total: 2.29 sq mi (5.94 km^{2})
  - Land: 1.71 sq mi (4.44 km^{2})
  - Water: 0.58 sq mi (1.50 km^{2})
- Elevation: 607 ft (185 m)

Population (2020)
  - Total: 281
  - Density: 164.0/sq mi (63.34/km^{2})
- Time zone: UTC-10 (Hawaii-Aleutian)
- ZIP code: 96727
- Area code: 808
- FIPS code: 15-41000
- GNIS feature ID: 0361536

Kukuihaele (Hawaiian for 'traveling light') is a census-designated place (CDP) in Hawaiʻi County, Hawaiʻi, United States. The population was 281 at the 2020 census.

== Geography ==
Kukuihaele is located on the north side of the island of Hawaii at 20°7′10″N 155°34′16″W (20.119536, -155.571160). It sits at an elevation of 730 feet (220 m) atop cliffs overlooking Waipio Bay. Hawaii Route 240 passes through the southern part of the community, ending less than 1 mile (1.6 km) to the west at an overlook into the Waipio Valley, and leading east 7 miles (11 km) to Honokaa. Hilo is 50 miles (80 km) to the southeast.

According to the United States Census Bureau, the Kukuihaele CDP has a total area of 2.3 square miles (5.9 km^{2}), of which 1.7 square miles (4.4 km^{2}) are land and 0.58 square miles (1.5 km^{2}), or 25.30%, are water.

== Demographics ==
Historical population
Census	Pop.	Note	%±
2020	281		—
U.S. Decennial Census

As of the census of 2000, there were 317 people, 106 households, and 76 families residing in the CDP. The population density was 187.7 inhabitants per square mile (72.5/km^{2}). There were 124 housing units at an average density of 73.4 per square mile (28.3/km^{2}). The racial makeup of the CDP was 22.40% White, 1.26% Native American, 25.55% Asian, 16.40% Pacific Islander, and 34.38% from two or more races. 11.99% of the population were Hispanic or Latino of any race.

There were 106 households, out of which 31.1% had children under the age of 18 living with them, 52.8% were married couples living together, 13.2% had a female householder with no husband present, and 27.4% were non-families. 22.6% of all households were made up of individuals, and 16.0% had someone living alone who was 65 years of age or older. The average household size was 2.99 and the average family size was 3.49.

In the CDP the population was spread out, with 24.6% under the age of 18, 10.1% from 18 to 24, 24.3% from 25 to 44, 23.0% from 45 to 64, and 18.0% who were 65 years of age or older. The median age was 40 years. For every 100 females, there were 101.9 males. For every 100 females age 18 and over, there were 102.5 males.

The median income for a household in the CDP was $38,750, and the median income for a family was $40,833. Males had a median income of $28,750 versus $22,353 for females. The per capita income for the CDP was $15,623. 14.9% of the population and 11.0% of families were below the poverty line. Out of the total population, 23.6% of those under the age of 18 and 20.8% of those 65 and older were living below the poverty line.

== History ==
Kukuihaele is the site of the original Hawaiian Island stand of cinchona trees, from which quinine is made. It was planted by David McHattie Forbes in the early 1900s.

Kukuihaele was known in ancient Hawaii as "the land of many heiau" (temples). During the migratory period of Hawaii, a healing priest (Kahuna la'au lapa'au) lived here and trained many to become healers. His name was, Kamakanui'ahailono. Most of the heiau, except for one, were destroyed by sugar planters.

== See also ==
- List of census-designated places in Hawaii
