= ʻImiola Church =

Church building in Waimea, Hawaii County

- U.S. National Register of Historic Places
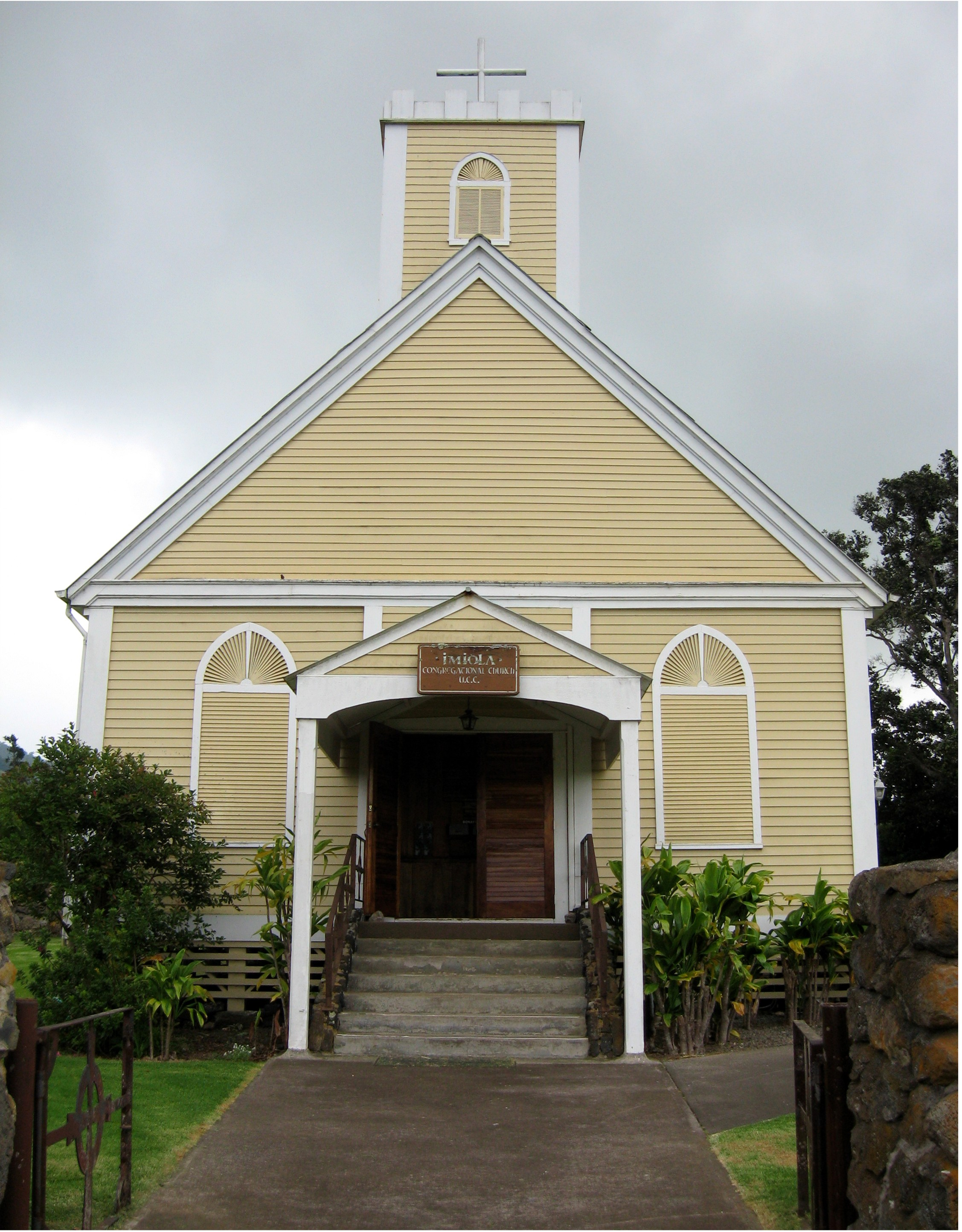
- The church today

- Location within Hawaii
- Location: NE of Waimea on HI 19, Waimea, Hawaii County, Hawaii
- Coordinates: 20°1′32″N 155°39′46″W
- Area: 1.1 acres (0.45 ha)
- Built: 1837, 1855
- Architectural style: Wood
- NRHP reference No.: 75000618
- Added to NRHP: August 28, 1975

ʻImiola Church is a historic wood structure in Waimea, on the Island of Hawaiʻi, coordinates 20°1′32″N 155°39′46″W.

== History ==
The church was designed by its first pastor, Lorenzo Lyons. A grass hut had been built on this spot for visiting preachers some time before 1832 when Rev. Lyons arrived. A new building was constructed of stone walls with a thatched roof between 1837 and 1843. One reason was the earthquake and tsunami of 1837 which caused some to believe (as preached by Millerism) that a new Advent of Christ would arrive in 1843. However, membership of the parish dropped from a high of almost 5,000 to about 1200 by 1841.

By 1855 the stone church was in ruins, and a new church of about 40 by 60 feet (18 m) was started on August 29, 1855, made of koa wood (Acacia koa) from nearby forests. The altar of hand carved Hawaiian wood in the church was made by David McHattie Forbes and completed after his death in 1937 by his oldest son David Merlyn Lougher Forbes. The calabash bowl light fixtures are a distinctive design feature inspired by the same native Hawaiian form. Some of the walls of the old church still stand, enclosing the grave site of Rev. Lyons, his wife, and a young son. The name comes from 'imi ola in the Hawaiian Language which means "seek salvation".

== Today ==
In 1955 the paint was removed from the interior and natural finish of koa wood was restored. The church continues to be in use and is usually open to the public. The church belongs to the Hawaii Island Association of the Hawaii Conference of the United Church of Christ. The state registry lists it as site 10-06-7151 as of July 25, 1981. On August 28, 1975, it was added to the National Register of Historic Places as site number 75000618.

== Gallery ==
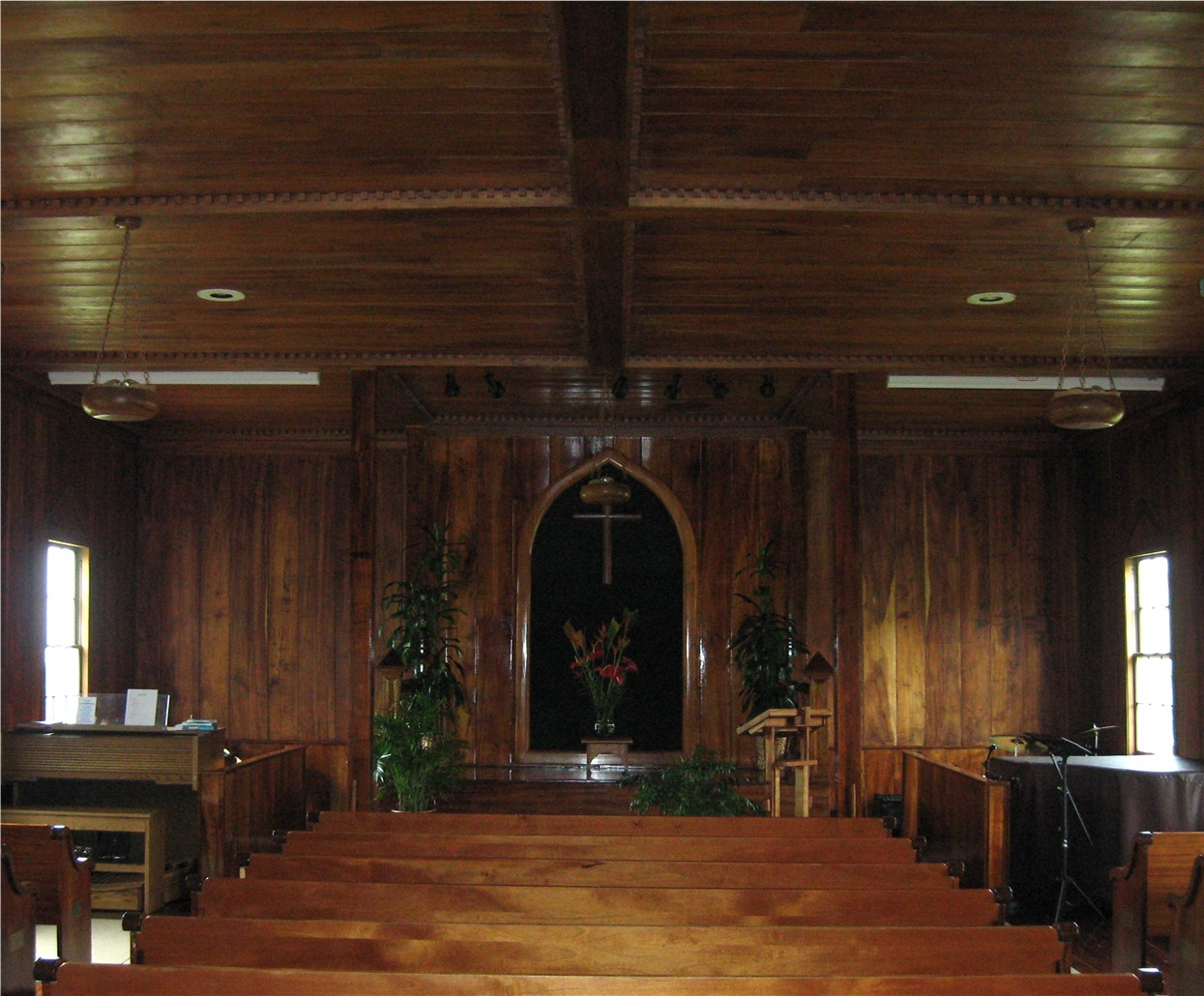
Restored koa woodwork in the interior of the Church

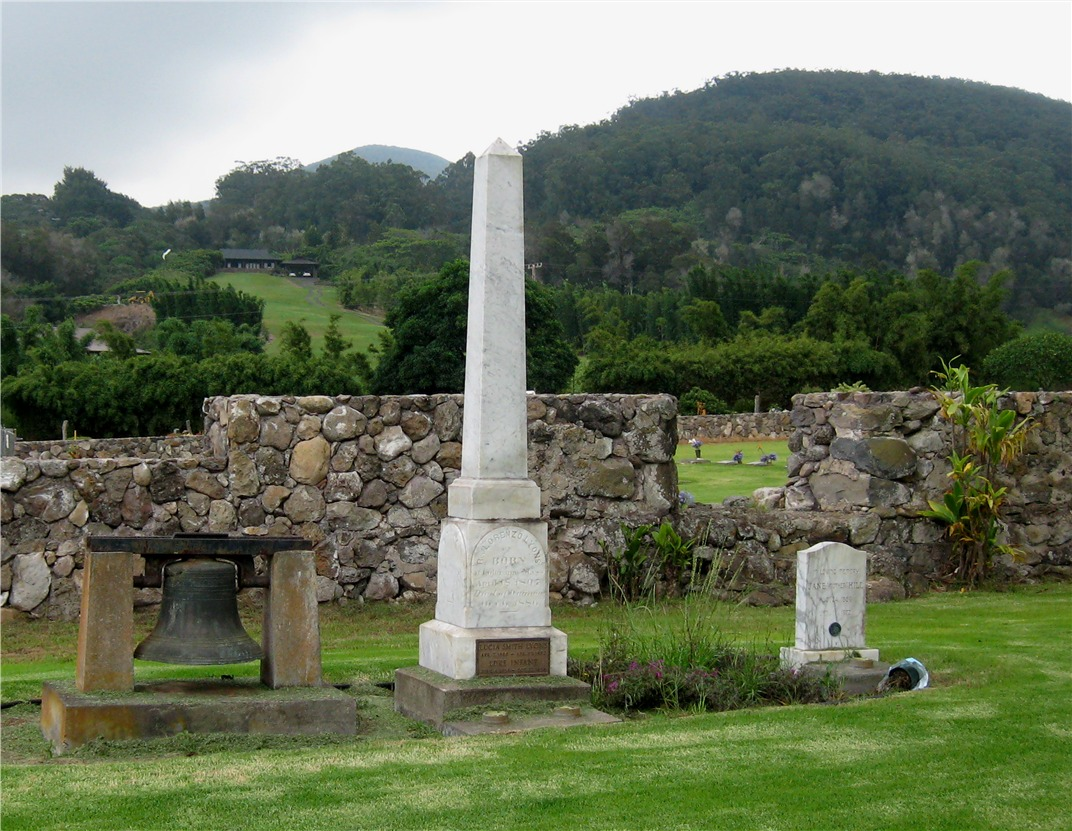
Rev. Lorenzo Lyons family grave site is near an old wall
