= Piʻiholo =

Hill in Maui County, United States of America

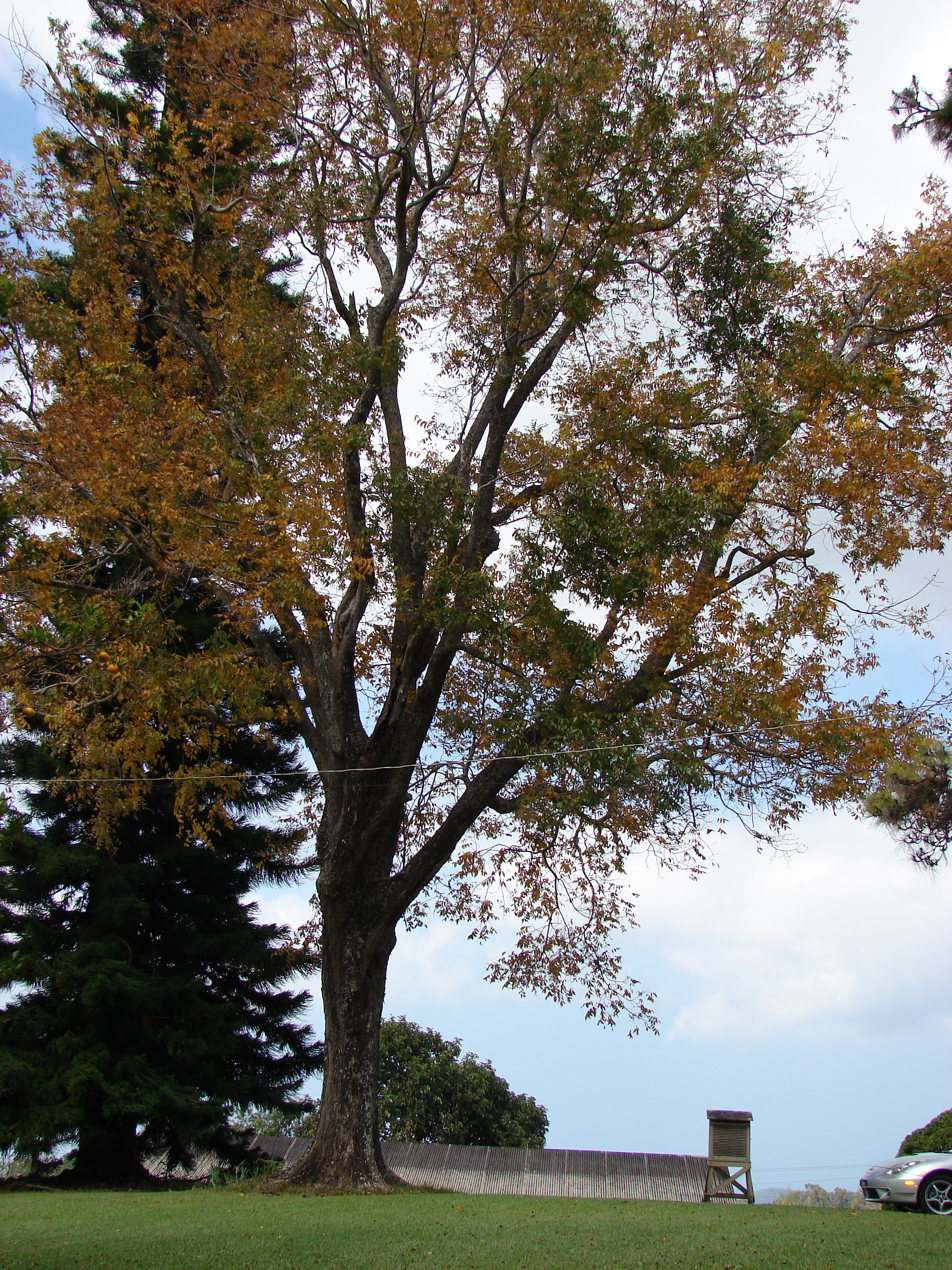
Piʻiholo's elevation of 689 meters is high enough to support temperate-zone plants such as pine and pecan.

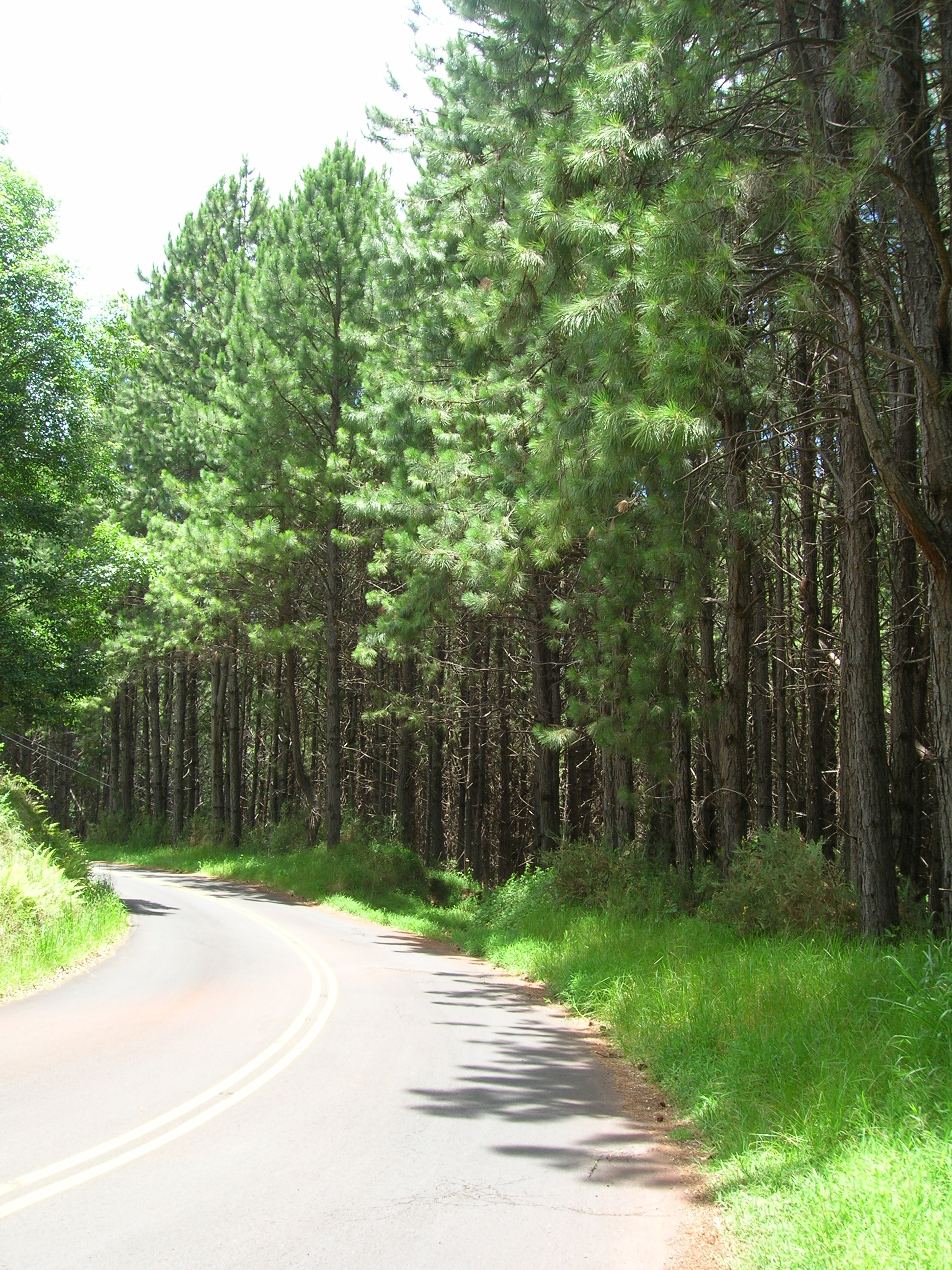
loblolly pine plantation at Piʻiholo.

Piʻiholo is a mountain summit on the island of Maui in Hawaii. It is at 20°51′7″N 156°17′33″W and has an elevation of 689 meters (2,260 feet).

Its soils are mostly dark reddish brown silty clays developed on long-weathered volcanic ash which supports ranchland where cattle and horses are raised. There also is a headquarters unit of the Maui Invasive Species Committee (MISC) at the Haleakala Experiment Station of the University of Hawaiʻi. The nearest town is Makawao.

The major landowner in the area is the family descended from Henry Perrine Baldwin (1842–1911). His son Henry Alexander Baldwin created the Piʻiholo Ranch out of the larger Haleakala Ranch, named after Haleakalā, the highest point in Maui. The ranch now features eco-tourism. The endangered Hawaiian goose Branta sandvicensis known as Nēnē in the Hawaiian language, is being reintroduced here under supervision of Peter Baldwin.
