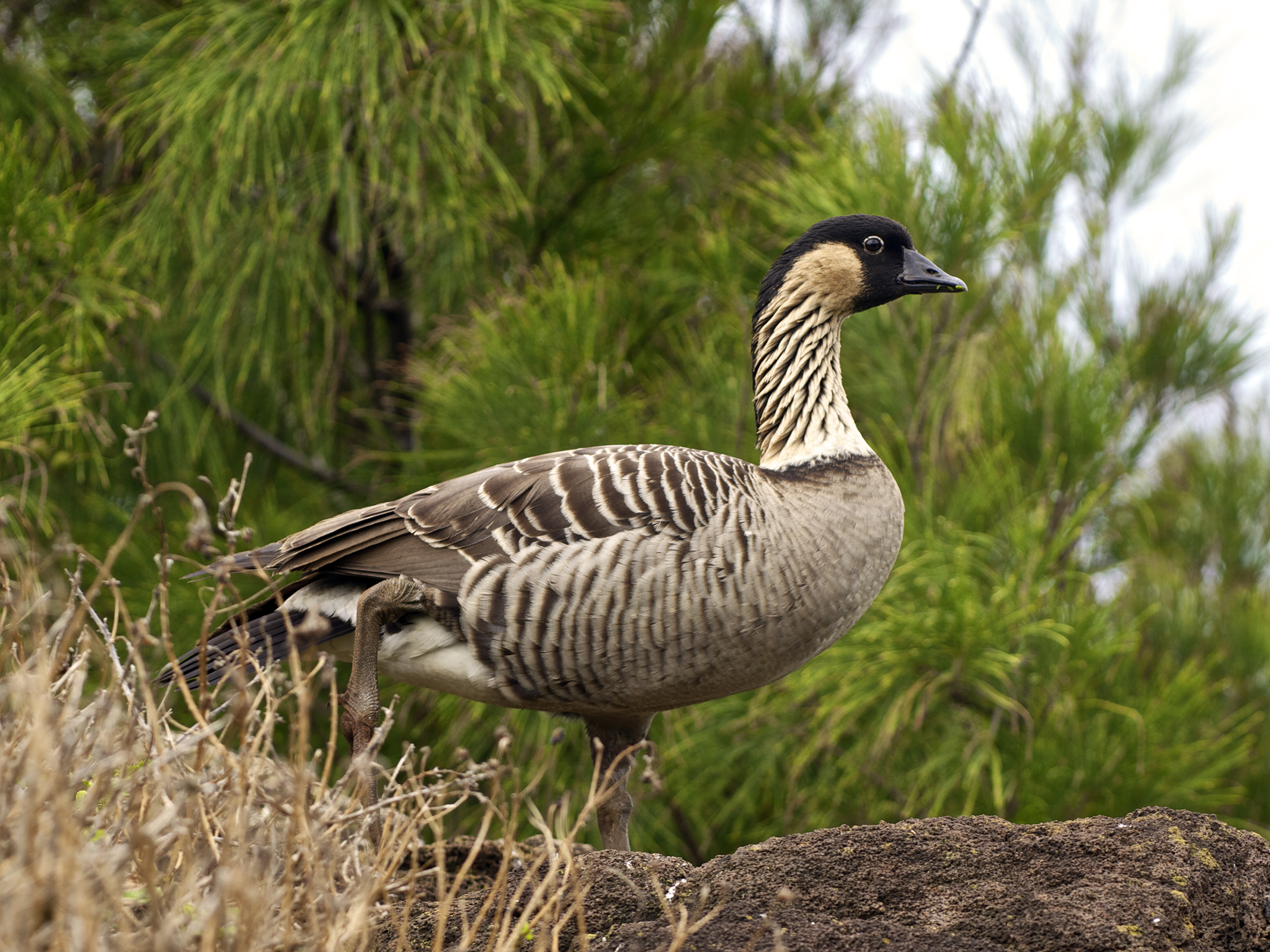
- At Kilauea Point National Wildlife Refuge, Hawaii, US

Conservation status
- Near Threatened (IUCN 3.1)
- CITES Appendix I

Scientific classification
- Kingdom: Animalia
- Phylum: Chordata
- Class: Aves
- Order: Anseriformes
- Family: Anatidae
- Genus: Branta
- Species: B. sandvicensis

Binomial name
- Branta sandvicensis (Vigors, 1834)

Synonyms
- Bernicla Sandvicensis (protonym); Nesochen sandvicensis; Branta sandwichensis

= Nene (bird) =

Species of bird

The nene (Branta sandvicensis), also known as the nēnē or the Hawaiian goose, is a species of bird endemic to the Hawaiian Islands. The nene is exclusively found in the wild on the islands of Maui, Kauaʻi, Molokaʻi, and Hawaiʻi. In 1957, it was designated as the official state bird of the state of Hawaiʻi.

The Hawaiian name nēnē comes from its soft call. The specific name sandvicensis refers to the Sandwich Islands, a former name for the Hawaiian Islands.

== Taxonomy ==
The holotype specimen of Anser sandvicensis Vigors is held in the vertebrate zoology collection at World Museum, National Museums Liverpool, with accession number NML-VZ T12706. The specimen was collected from the Sandwich Islands (Hawaiian Islands) and came to the Liverpool national collection via the Museum of the Zoological Society of London collection, Thomas Campbell Eyton's collection, and Henry Baker Tristram's collection.

It is thought that the nene evolved from the Canada goose (Branta canadensis), which most likely arrived on the Hawaiian islands about 500,000 years ago, shortly after the island of Hawaiʻi was formed. The Canada goose is also the ancestor of the prehistoric giant Hawaiʻi goose (Branta rhuax) and the nēnē-nui (Branta hylobadistes). The nēnē-nui was larger than the nene, varied from flightless to flighted depending on the individual, and inhabited the island of Maui. Similar fossil geese found on Oʻahu and Kauaʻi may be of the same species. The giant Hawaiʻi goose was restricted to the island of Hawaiʻi and measured 1.2 m (3.9 ft) in length with a mass of 8.6 kg (19 lb), making it more than four times larger than the nene. It is believed that the herbivorous giant Hawaiʻi goose occupied the same ecological niche as the goose-like ducks known as moa-nalo, which were not present on the Big Island. Based on mitochondrial DNA found in fossils, all Hawaiian geese, living and extinct, are closely related to the giant Canada goose (B. c. maxima) and dusky Canada goose (B. c. occidentalis).

== Description ==
The nene is a large-sized goose at 41 cm (16 in) tall. Although it spends most of its time on the ground, it is capable of flight, with some individuals flying daily between nesting and feeding areas. Females have a mass of 1.525–2.56 kg (3.36–5.64 lb), while males average 1.695–3.05 kg (3.74–6.72 lb), 11% larger than females. Adults have a black head and hindneck, buff cheeks, and a heavily furrowed neck. The neck has black and white diagonal stripes. The adult's bill, legs, and feet are black. The webbing on its feet recedes farther back from its toes than in a typical Branta goose, an adaptation which arose due to its volcanic habitat and need to walk on cooled lava. It has soft feathers under its chin. Goslings resemble adults, but are a duller brown and with less demarcation between the colors of the head and neck, and striping and barring effects are much reduced.

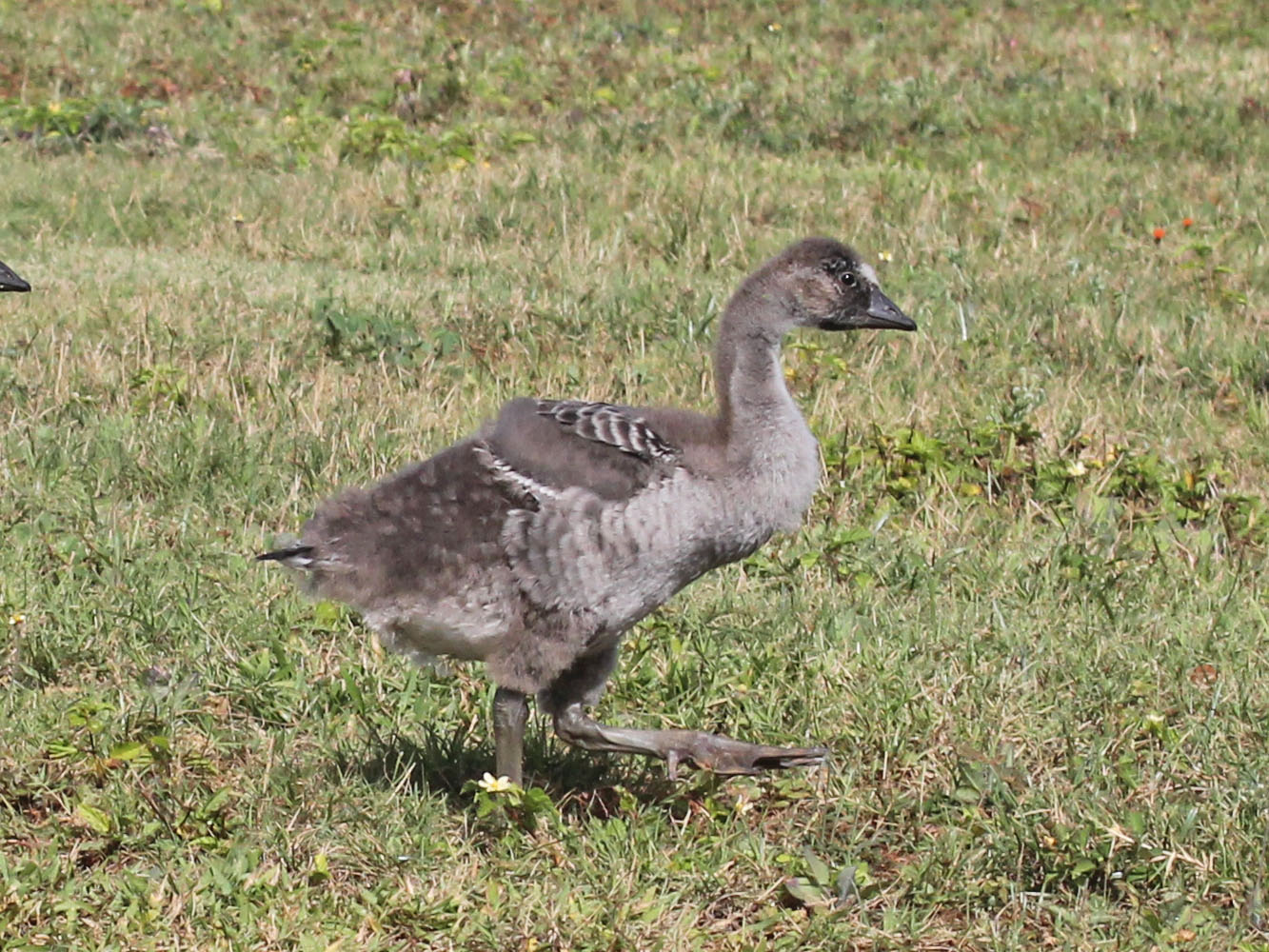
Nēnē gosling on Kauaʻi

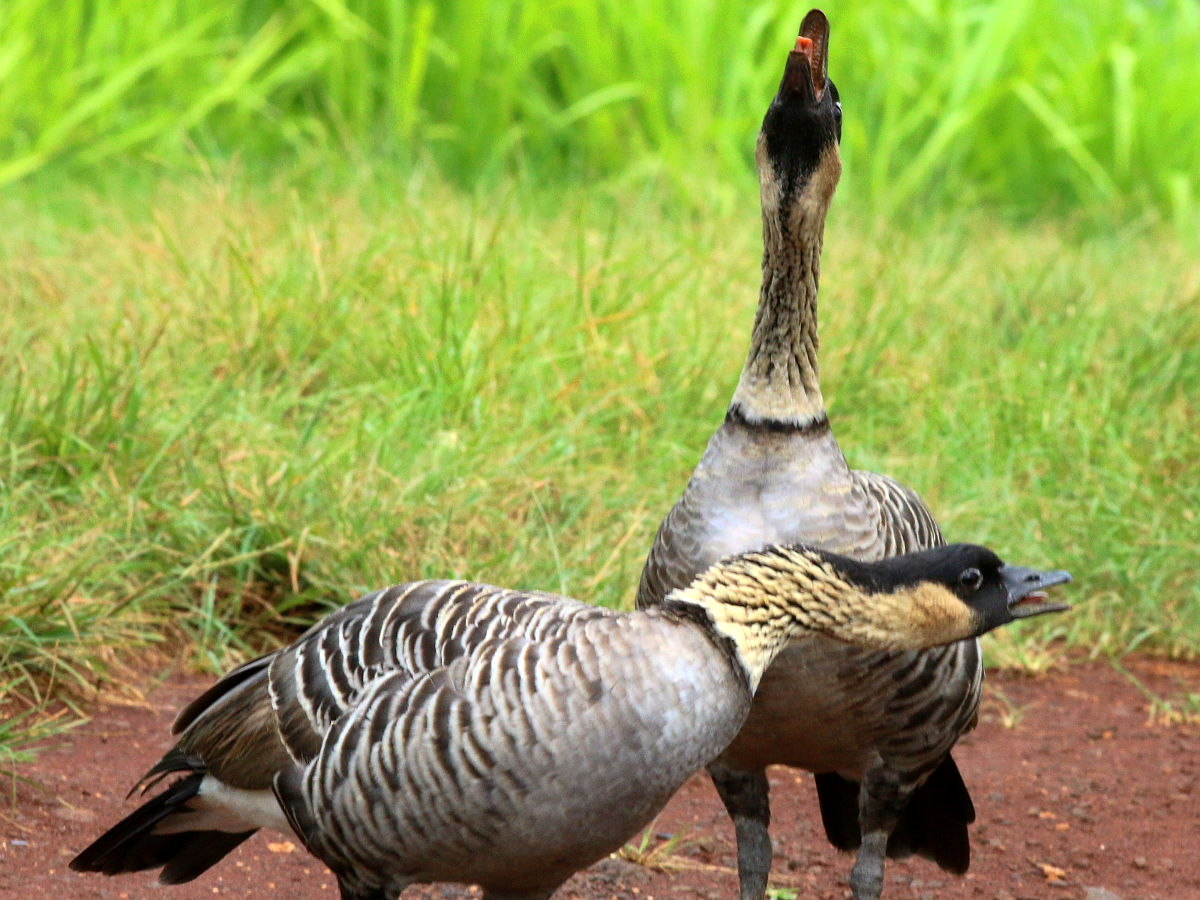
Unison calling Kīlauea Point

== Habitat and range ==
The nene is an inhabitant of shrubland, grassland, coastal dunes, and lava plains, and related anthropogenic habitats such as pasture and golf courses from sea level to as much as 2,400 m (7,900 ft). Some populations migrated between lowland breeding grounds and montane foraging areas.

The nene could at one time be found on the islands of Hawaiʻi, Maui, Kahoʻolawe, Lānaʻi, Molokaʻi, Oʻahu and Kauaʻi. Today, its range is restricted to Hawaiʻi, Maui, Molokaʻi, and Kauaʻi. A pair arrived at the James Campbell National Wildlife Refuge on Oʻahu in January 2014; two of their offspring survived and are seen regularly on the nearby golf courses at Turtle Bay Resort.

== Ecology and behavior ==
=== Breeding ===
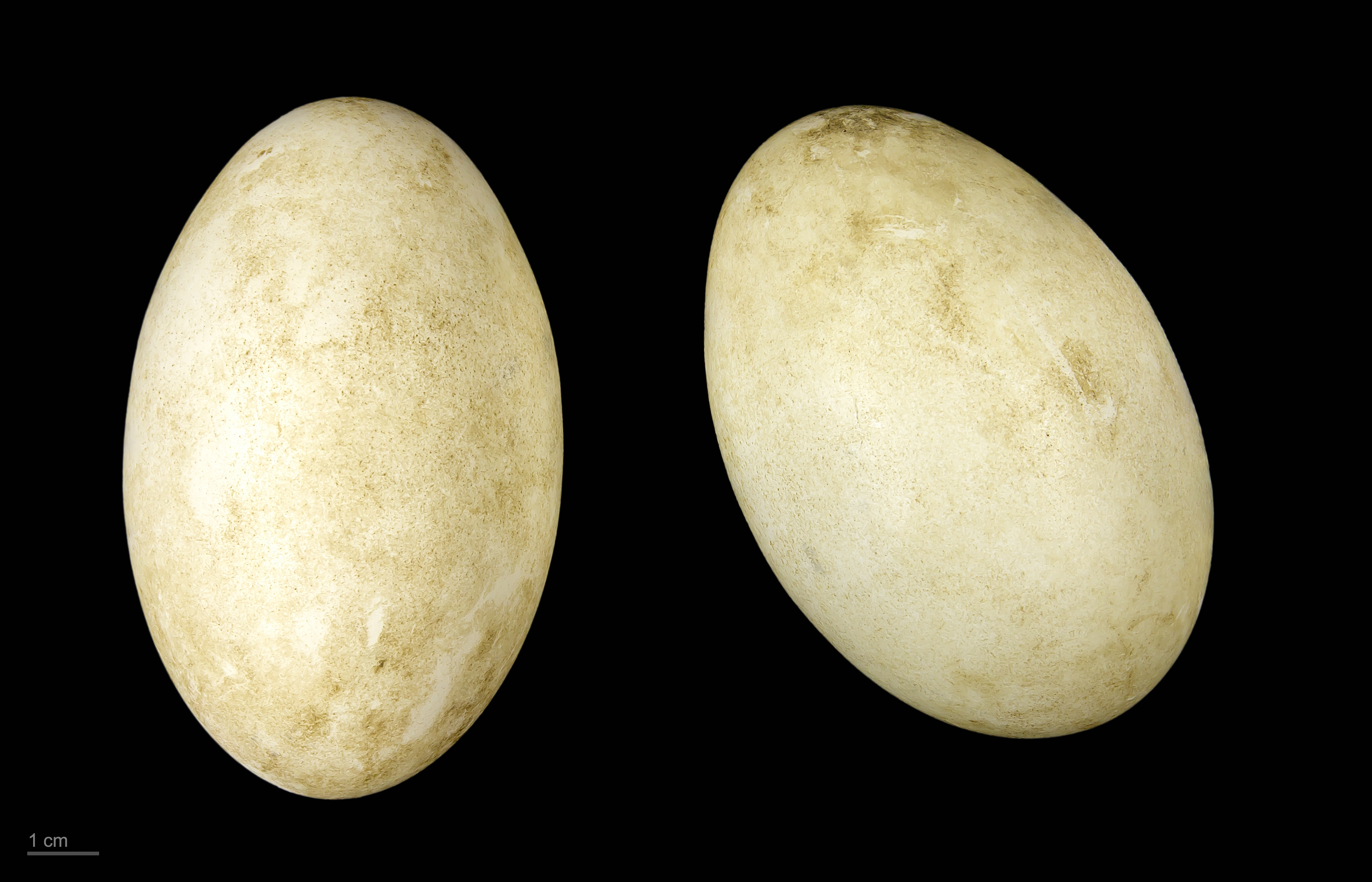
Nēnē egg specimens

The breeding season of the nene, from August to April, is longer than that of any other goose; most eggs are laid between November and January. Unlike most other waterfowl, the nene mates on land. Nests are built by females on a site of her choosing, in which one to five eggs are laid (average is three on Maui and Hawaiʻi, four on Kauaʻi). The eggs measure 7.2–9.2 cm (2.8–3.6 in) in length and 4.9–6.1 cm (1.9–2.4 in) in width. Females incubate the eggs for 29 to 32 days, while the male acts as a sentry. Goslings are precocial, able to feed on their own; they remain with their parents until the following breeding season.

=== Diet ===
The nene is a herbivore that will either graze or browse, depending on the availability of vegetation. Food items include the leaves, seeds, fruit, and flowers of grasses and shrubs.

== Conservation ==
The nene population stood at 3,862 birds in 2022, making it the world's rarest goose. It is believed that it was once common, with approximately 25,000 Hawaiian geese living in Hawaiʻi when Captain James Cook arrived in 1778. Hunting and introduced predators, such as small Indian mongooses, pigs, and feral cats, reduced the population to 30 birds by 1952. In 1958, the United States Congress passed a law authorizing the creation of a federal protection program for the nene, at that time numbering fewer than 50 individuals. The species breeds well in captivity and has been successfully reintroduced. In 2004, it was estimated that there were 800 birds in the wild, as well as 1,000 in wildfowl collections and zoos. As of the most recent IUCN Red List assessment in 2021, there are an estimated 2,600 - 3,300 wild individuals. There is concern about inbreeding due to the small initial population of birds. The nature reserve WWT Slimbridge, in England, was instrumental in the successful breeding of Hawaiian geese in captivity. Under the direction of conservationist Peter Scott, it was bred back from the brink of extinction during the 1950s for later re-introduction into the wild in Hawaiʻi. There are still Hawaiian geese at Slimbridge today. They can now be found in captivity in multiple WWT centres. Successful introductions include Haleakalā and Piʻiholo ranches on Maui. NatureServe considers the species Imperiled.

== Gallery ==
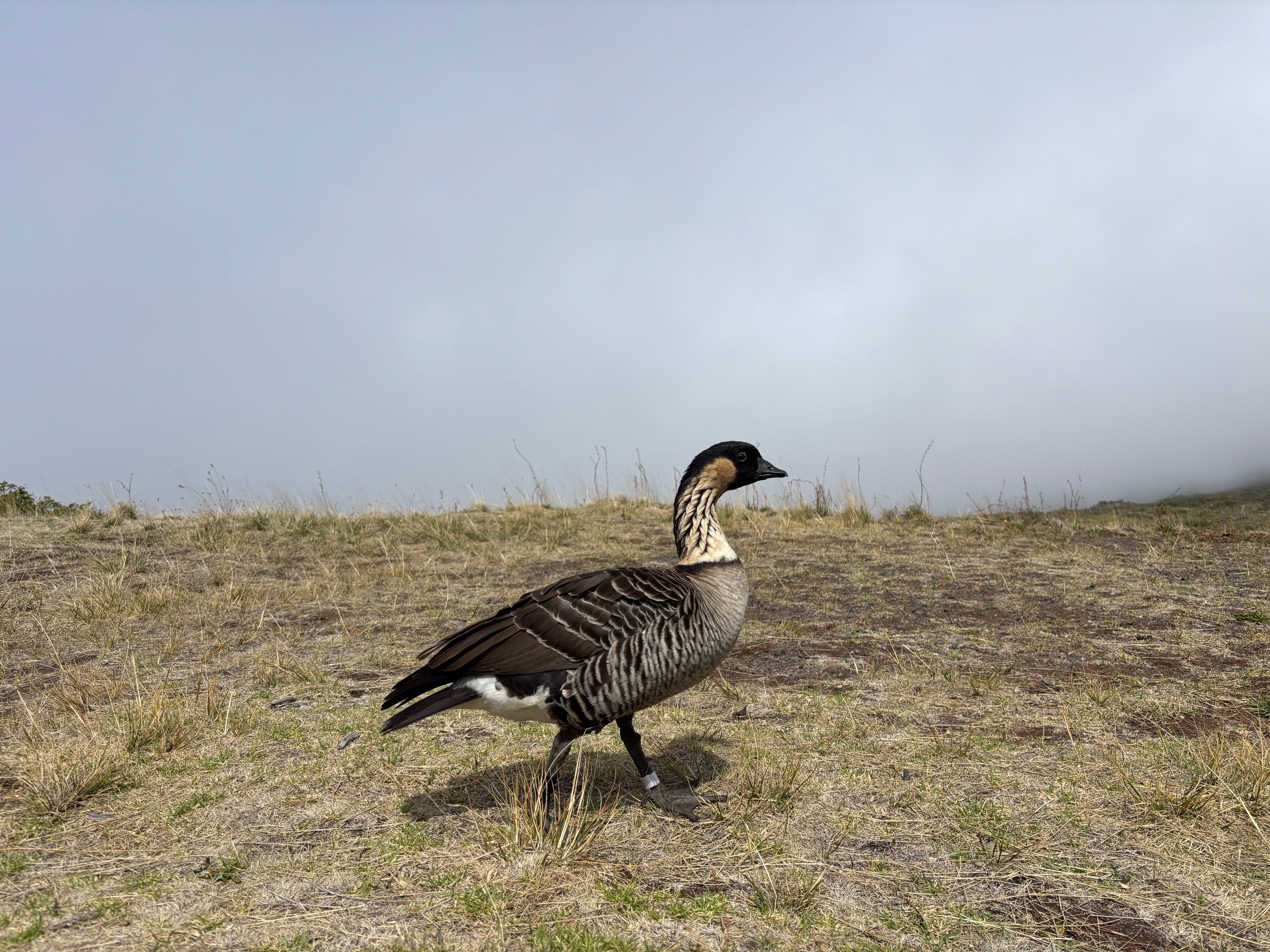
Adult nēnē in Haleakalā National Park

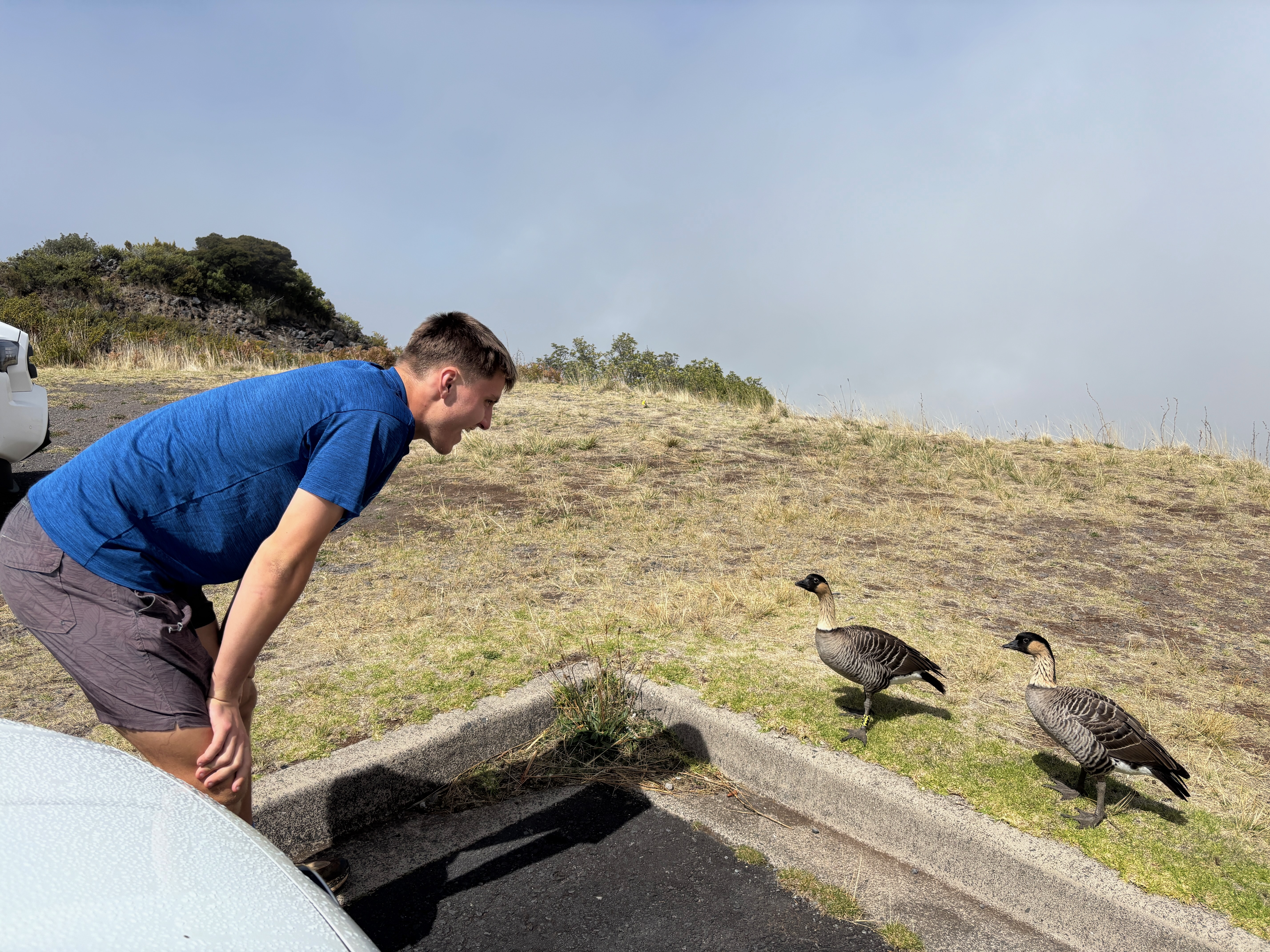
A human tourist looks at adult nēnē in Haleakalā National Park.

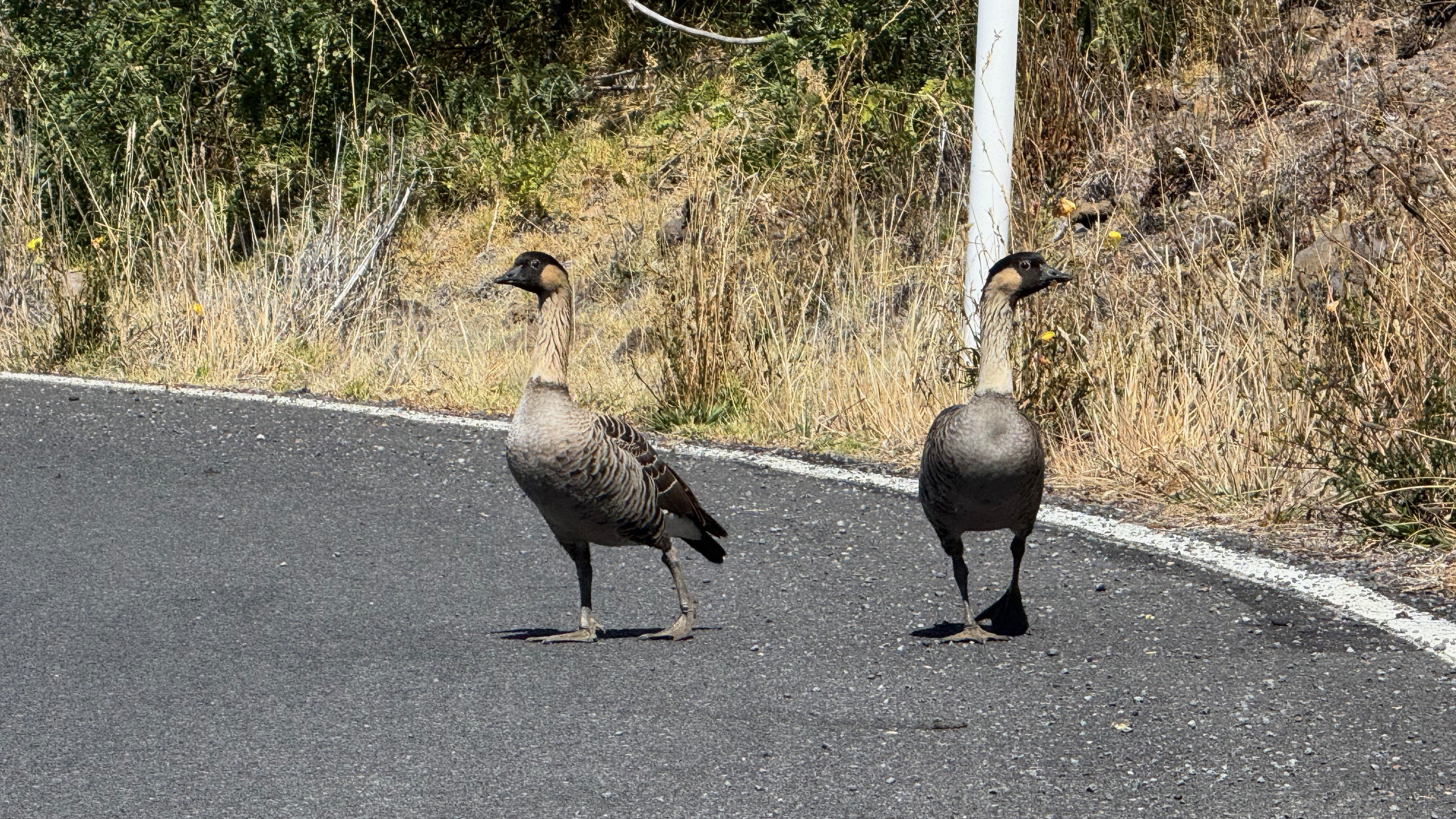
Adult nēnē wandering on the Haleakalā Highway

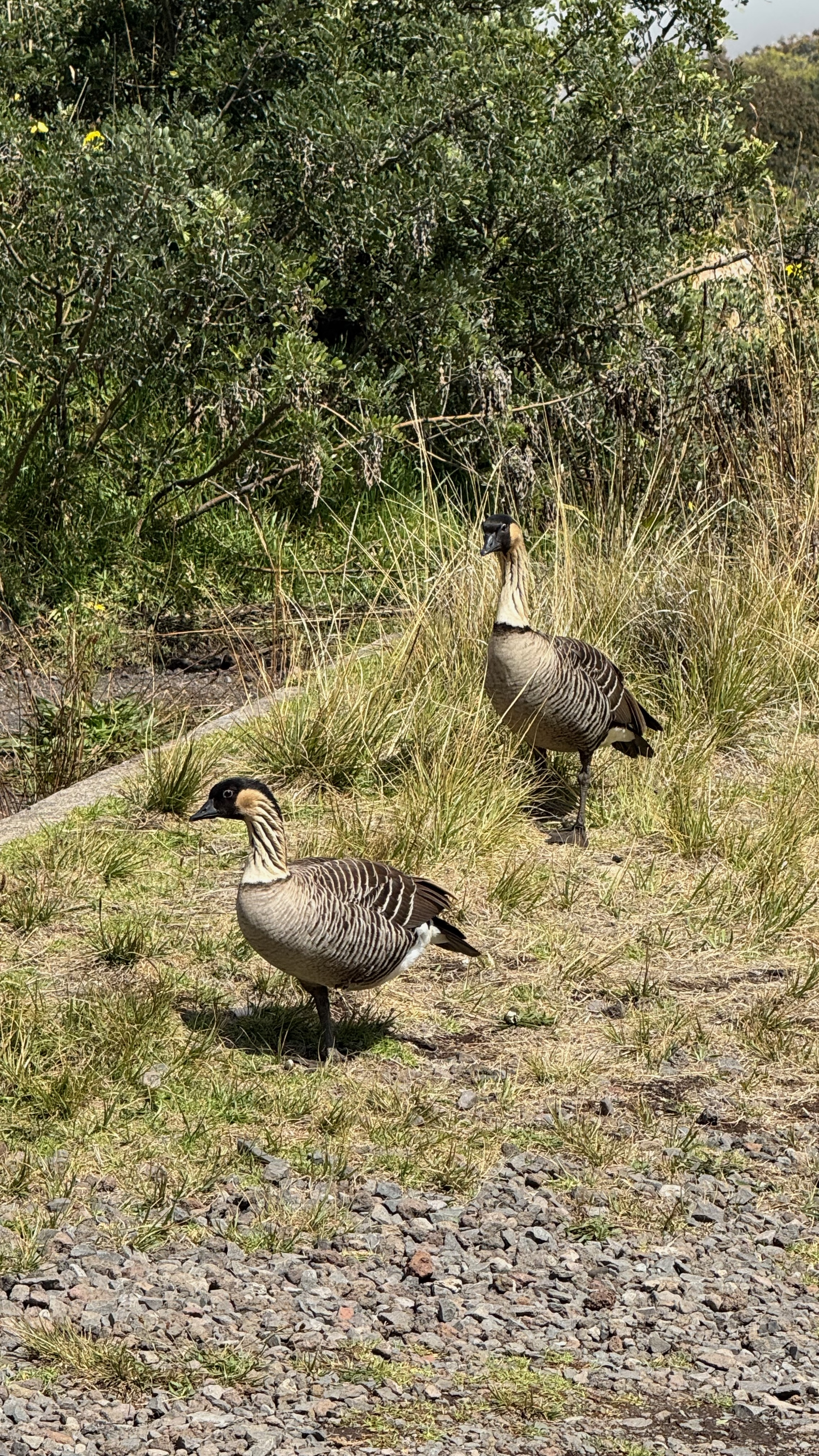
Adult nēnē in Haleakalā National Park

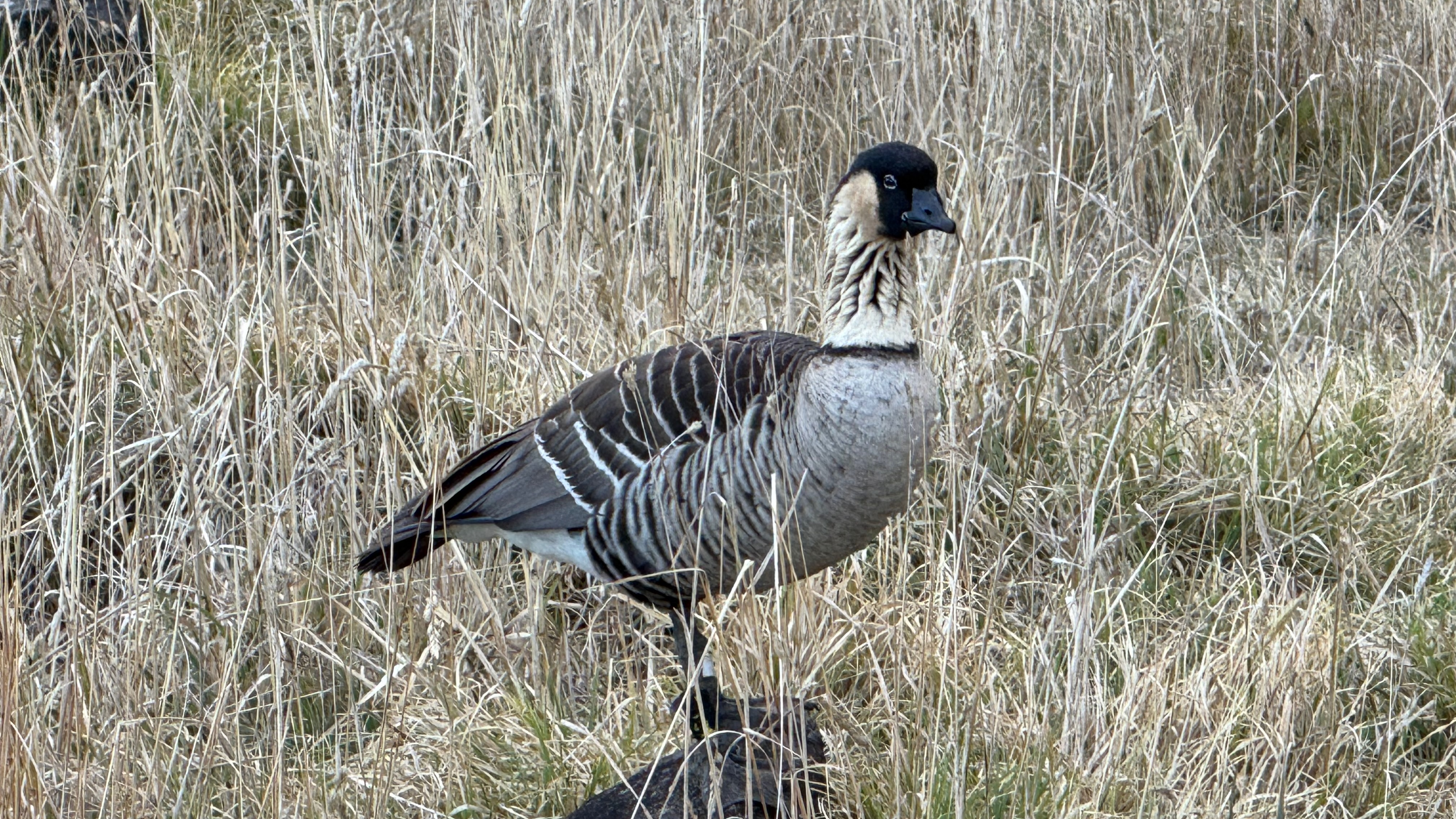
Inside the Haleakalā crater

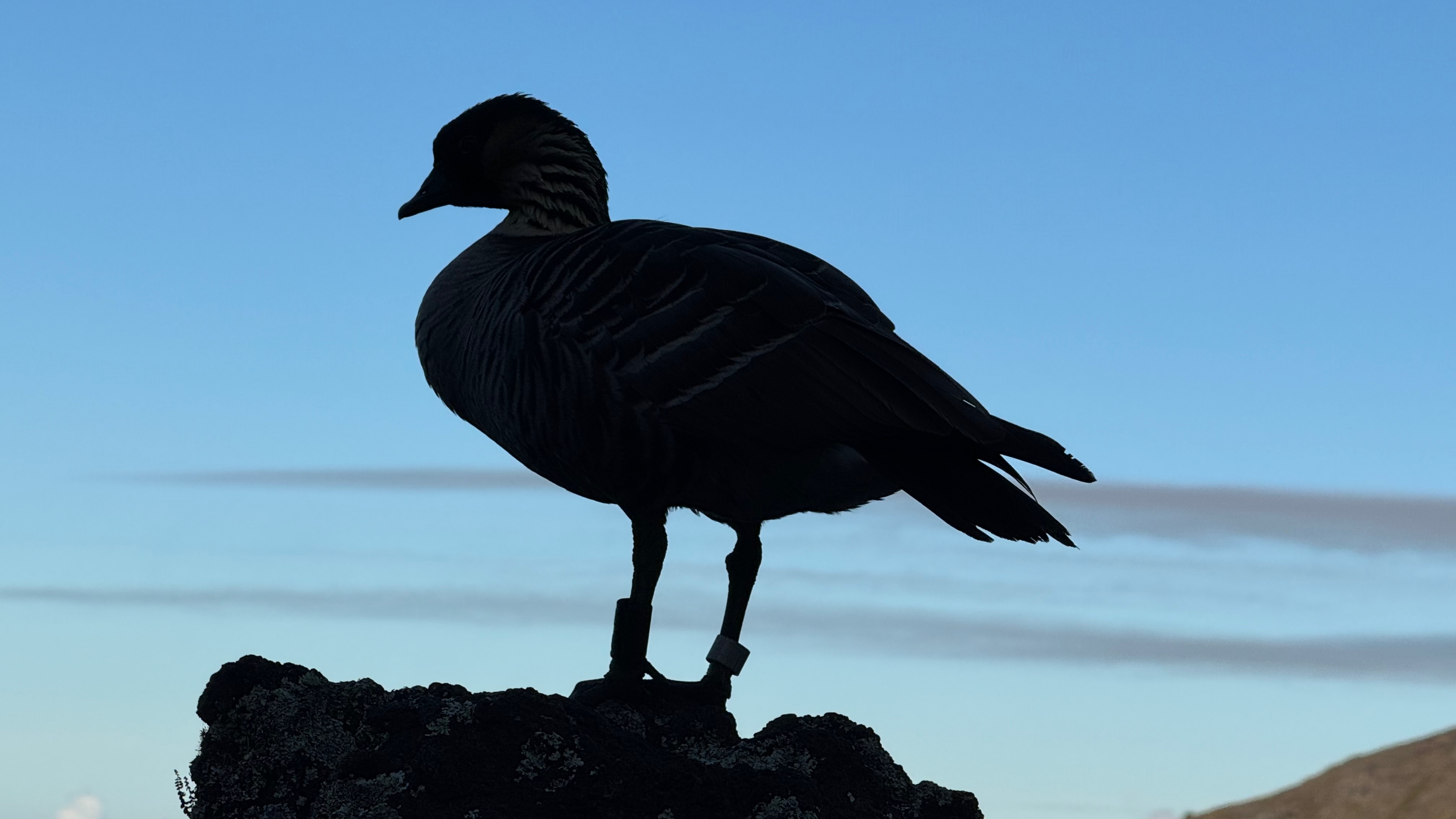
Silhouette of an adult nēnē standing on ʻaʻā lava. Their webbed feet evolved for walking on lava.
