= Waiākea, Hawaii =

Waiākea is an ancient subdivision (ahupuaʻa) in the Hilo District of the Big Island of Hawaiʻi and an early settlement on Hilo Bay.

== Origin ==
The name comes from wai ākea in the Hawaiian Language meaning "broad waters", and sometimes what is now called Hilo Bay was called Waiākea Bay. Waiākea is home to many and has its own schools. It stretches for miles and ends at Waiākea-Uka (the area on the slopes of Mauna Loa). Waiākea-Uka houses many expensive houses, including a Swiss chateau. There are also some cattle farms in Waiākea-Uka, and a state forest reserve.

There are four schools located in the Waiākea complex: Waiakeawaena Elementary School, Waiakea Elementary School, Waiakea Intermediate School, and Waiakea High School.

Waiākea Stream flows from the slopes of Mauna Loa at 19°37′57″N 155°10′41″W into Waiākea Pond at an elevation of only 10 feet (3.0 m) at 19°42′53″N 155°4′35″W.

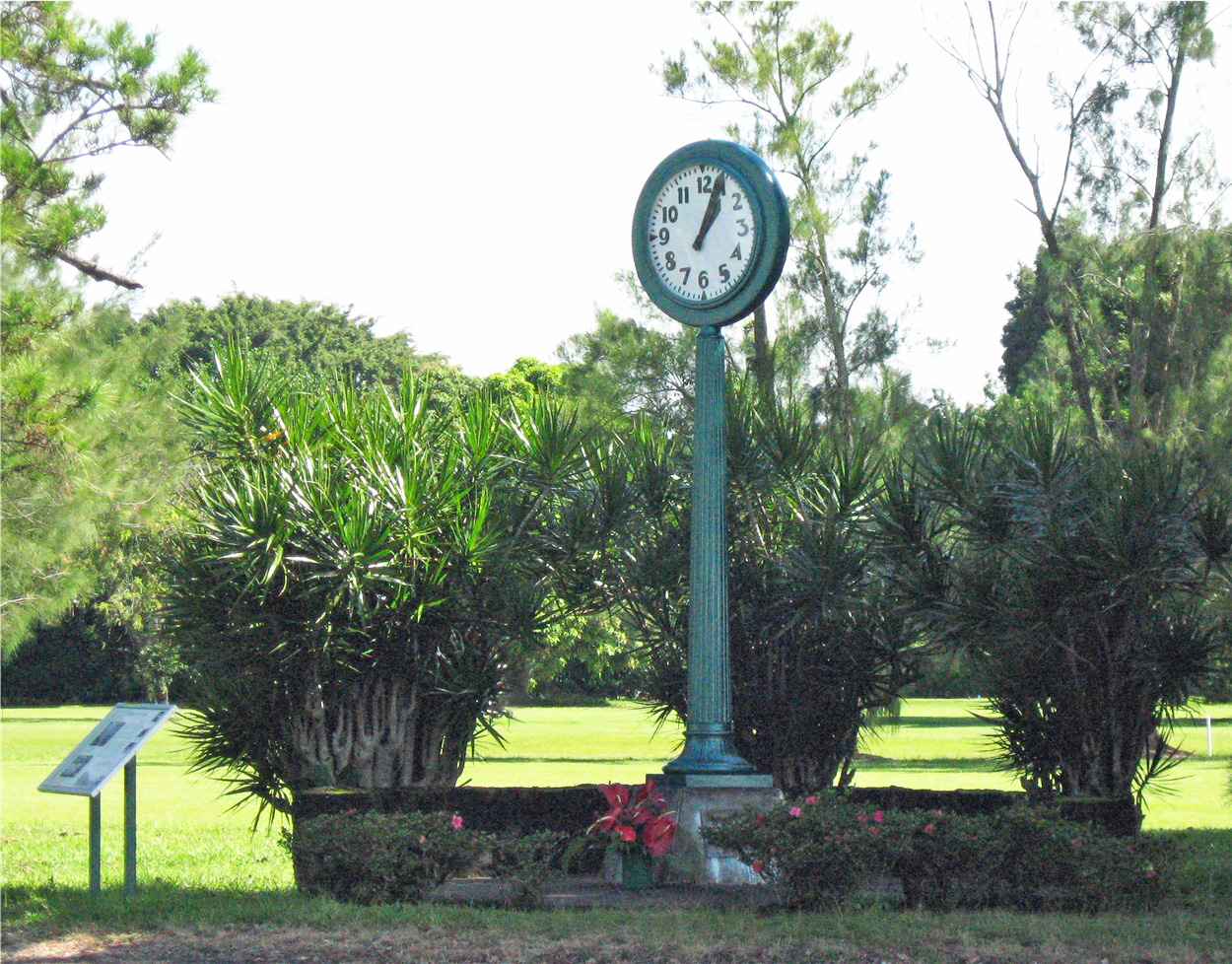
Tsunami memorial clock

== History ==
When William Ellis visited in 1823, Waiākea was the main settlement on Hilo Bay. The Waiākea Mission (now called Haili Church) was the first church in eastern Hawaiʻi island, founded in 1824. Several eruptions of Mauna Loa (the most recent in 1984) have threatened the area. Tsunamis devastated Waiākea-Kai (along the coast), with the largest in 1946 and 1960. A clock found in the rubble set to the exact time when it stopped in 1960 serves as a memorial.
