= Volcano House =

Historic site in Hawaii County, Hawaii

- Old Volcano House No. 42
- U.S. National Register of Historic Places
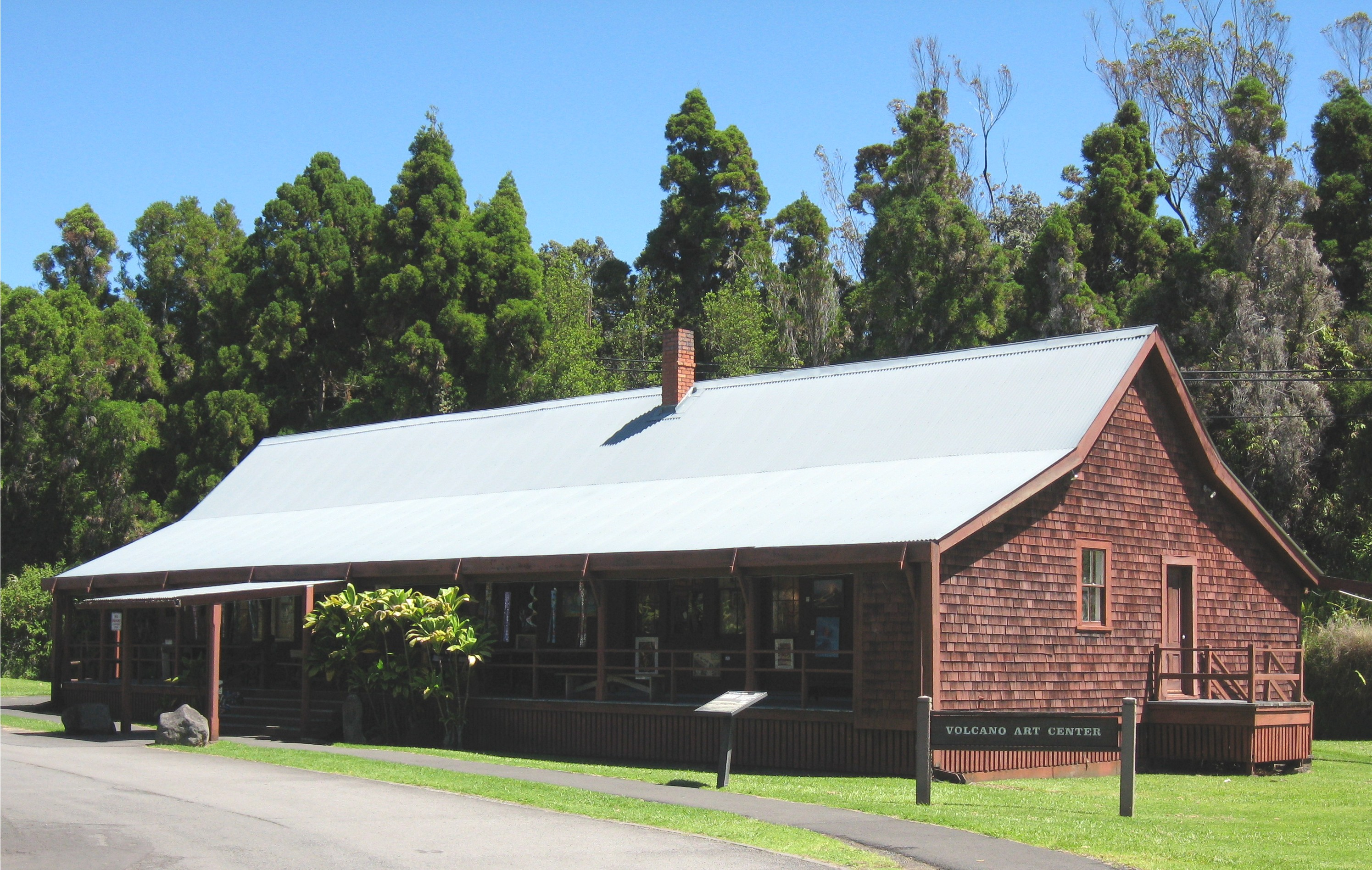
- The 1877 building now houses an art gallery

- Location within Hawaii
- Nearest city: Volcano, Hawaii
- Coordinates: 19°25′49″N 155°15′30″W
- Area: 104 feet (32 m) by 110 feet (34 m)
- Built: 1877
- Architect: Multiple
- NRHP reference No.: 74000293
- Added to NRHP: July 24, 1974

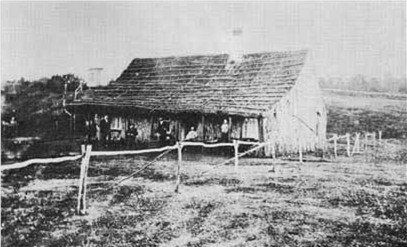
The 1866 structure where Mark Twain stayed

Volcano House is the name of a series of historic hotels built at the edge of Kīlauea, within the grounds of Hawai'i Volcanoes National Park on the Island of Hawai'i. The original 1877 building is listed on the National Register of Historic Places and now houses the Volcano Art Center. The hotel in use today was built in 1941 and expanded in 1961.

Between May 2018 and October 2018, the hotel and the Kīlauea summit area of the national park were closed to the public due to volcanic explosions and earthquakes.

== Early visitors ==
In ancient Hawaii the volcano was the place to make offerings to the fire goddess Pele. Archeological evidence shows activity for hundreds of years, including gathering of volcanic glass to use as cutting tools. Only a few rare eruptions such as the one in 1790 are explosive, and the northeast rim provides a relatively safe vantage point. The prevailing northeast trade winds and higher elevation cause poisonous gasses and lava to flow in the other direction. Rev. William Ellis describes camping in this area in his journal of his 1823 missionary tour with Asa Thurston.

An enterprising Hawaiian was reported to have set up a small thatched hut in the early 1840s to sell food to visitors, who by then included sightseers as well as explorers. Charles Wilkes camped in this area on the United States Exploring Expedition in 1840, on his way to Mauna Loa. About 1846 a primitive one-room grass shelter was constructed at the rim of the Kīlauea crater by Benjamin Pitman, the first hotel to call itself "Volcano House". Sometimes visitors would show up after the long journey and nobody would be home.

A more substantial wood-frame structure was built in 1866 with four bedrooms, parlor, and dining room. Mark Twain stayed here, and wrote about his visit in the book Roughing It.

== The 1877 structure ==
In 1876 George W. C. Jones bought out the other partners in the business and hired William H. Lentz to construct a longer-lasting structure, and manage the hotel. A wood-sided building about 104 by 110 feet (32 m × 34 m) was built in 1877. It included six guest rooms, two for the manager's family, and a dining room. Lumber for rafters and posts were harvested from local forests of naio (Myoporum sandwicense) and ʻōhiʻa lehua (Metrosideros polymorpha). Peter Lee built a hotel at the coast in Punaluʻu to the west, and a road across the Kaʻū Desert to bring visitors. He also built a competing hotel at the Kīlauea rim called the Crater House Hotel. From 1883 to 1885 it was owned by the Oliver T. Shipman family.

In 1891, a group led by Honolulu businessman and politician Lorrin A. Thurston (grandson of 1820s missionaries Asa and Lucy Goodale Thurston) acquired the Volcano House and Peter Lee's hotels. The business was so successful that a two-story addition became the main part of the hotel, adding 10 – 12 additional guest rooms, an observation tower, and a larger dining hall, using the 1877 structure as a wing. Thurston commissioned a cyclorama of Kīlauea which he displayed in his travels to the mainland, including the Chicago World's Columbian Exposition of 1893 and the California Midwinter International Exposition of 1894 in San Francisco. In 1894 a four-horse stagecoach reduced the travel time from Hilo from two days to six hours.

George Lycurgus bought the hotel in 1895 and was associated with it for the next 65 years. The Hawaii Consolidated Railway line to Glenwood opened in 1901, bringing more visitors. Author Jack London stayed in 1907. In 1912, geologist Thomas Jaggar built a scientific observatory adjacent to the porch, used until 1961 by the Hawaiian Volcano Observatory. The instruments were housed in an underground vault with massive concrete walls, excavated by laborers from the nearby prison.

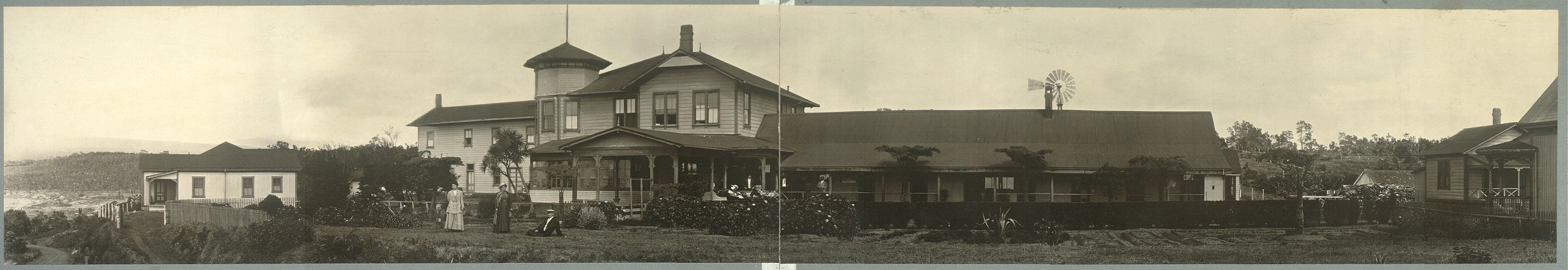
The hotel circa 1912 – center built in 1891 and the wing on the right is the 1877 structure

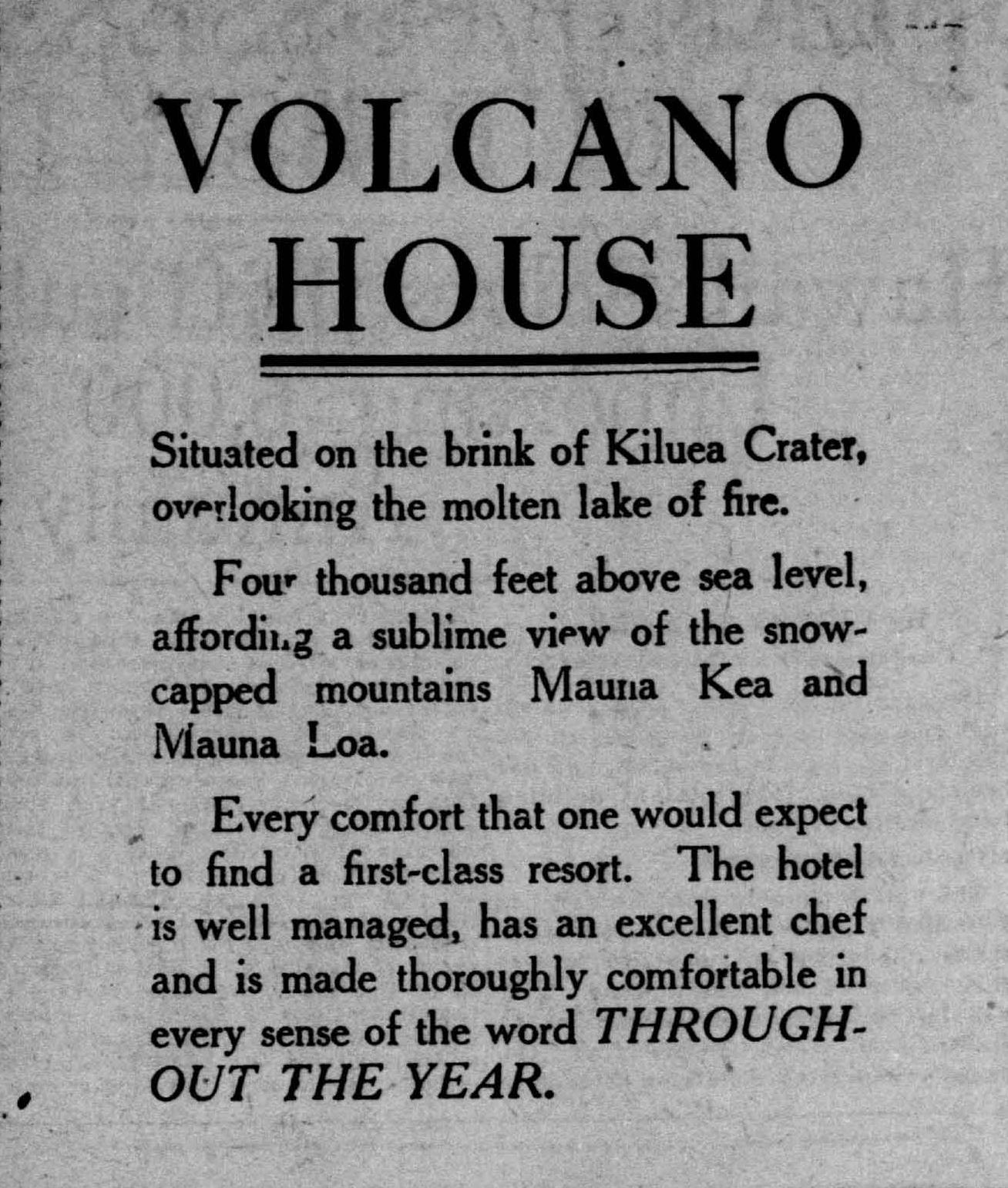
An advertisement in the August 14, 1912 issue of the San Francisco Call

After ten years of lobbying by Thurston, a National Park was established in 1916. In 1921, Inter-Island Steam Navigation Company bought the property with plans for another expansion. A large two-story wing took the place of the 1877 structure, which was literally sawn off and relocated back from the cliff to be used as employee quarters. Some of the building materials came from the dismantled Crater House Hotel just outside the park. In 1932, a decline in eruptions and the Great Depression allowed Lycurgus to buy it back for only $300.

In 1972 a dormitory for employees was built, and the vacant 1877 structure started to deteriorate. The 1877 building is state historic site 10-52-5508, and added to the National Register of Historic Places on July 24, 1974, as site 74000293. It was refurbished in the late 1970s and now houses the Volcano Art Center Gallery.

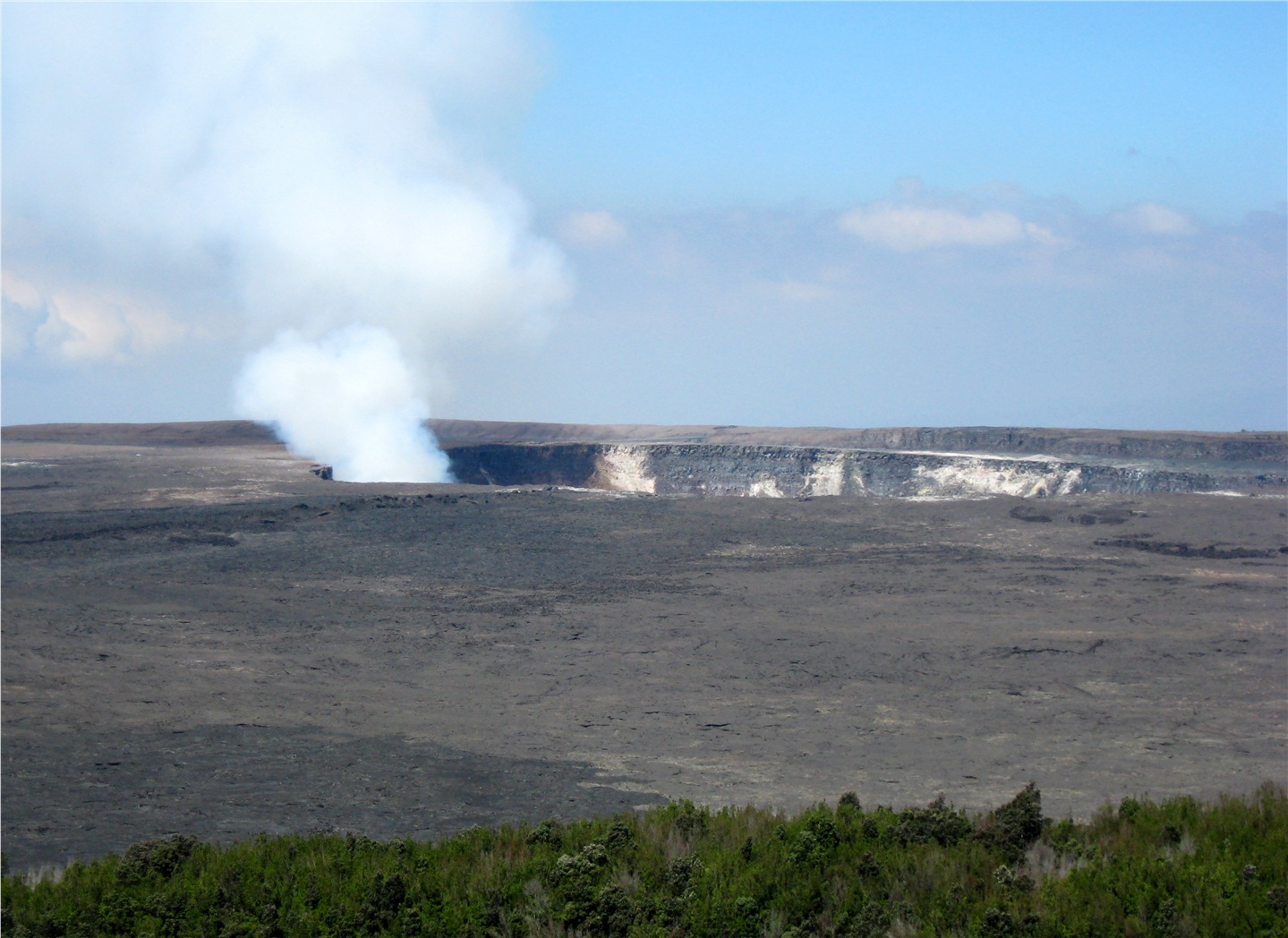
Halemaʻumaʻu seen from Volcano House.

== The modern hotel ==
The 115-room building burned to the ground from a kitchen fire on February 11, 1940. The 1877 structure was used again for guests while the new hotel was planned. Lycurgus visited Washington, D.C. to convince powerful friends (many, including President Franklin D. Roosevelt had stayed as guests) to allow him to build an even more elegant hotel on the site of the Hawaiian Volcano Observatory. A separate visitor center farther back from the rim was built by the Civilian Conservation Corps. By November 1941 a new building designed by Charles William Dickey (1871–1942) was opened southeast of the original site, at coordinates 19°25′42″N 155°15′29″W. A wing with larger rooms was added in 1958 – 1961, for a total of 42 rooms. The facility also includes a dining room, snack bar, art gallery, and gift shop. Volcano House remains the only public hotel within Hawaii Volcanoes National Park.

From 1977 to 1986, Volcano House was managed by Sheraton Hotels. From 1986 to 2008 it was owned and operated by Ken Direction Corporation of Hilo.

== Current status ==
On May 10, 2018, the hotel and the surrounding Kīlauea summit area of the national park was closed to the public as a result of then-ongoing volcanic explosions and earthquakes. The hotel reopened in late October 2018.

=== Recent history ===
In April 2008 the hotel had to be evacuated several times due to sulfur dioxide fumes from an eruption in Halemaʻumaʻu. The Ken Corporation's concession expired at the end of 2008, and the National Park Service undertook a search for a new concessionaire.

Effective January 1, 2010, Volcano House was closed temporarily for renovations. Initially the Park Service hoped to have the new concessionaire in place and the hotel reopened by January 1, 2011. In April 2012, Hawai'i Volcanoes Lodge Company, a partnership between Ortega National Parks (later renamed ExplorUS) and Aqua Hotels and Resorts, became the new concessioner. The gift shop and Namakani Paio cabins and campground opened shortly thereafter. Work on the rest of the building began in January 2013. The hotel and restaurant completed renovations and both the hotel and the restaurant opened for business in June 2013.
