= Powers Caldera =

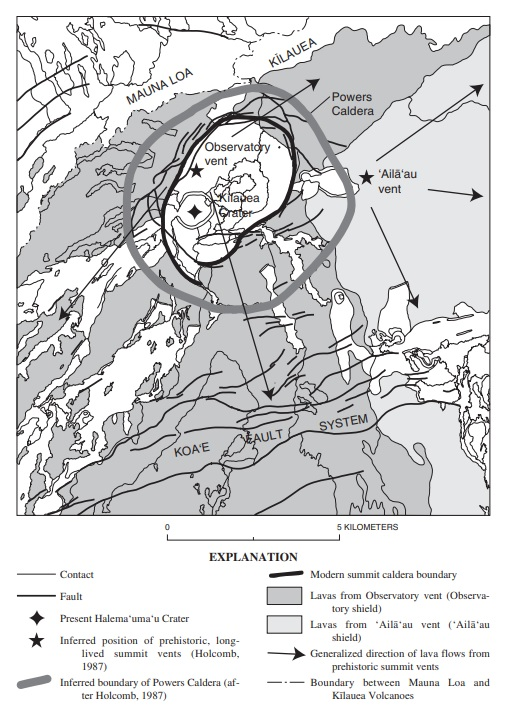
Geological map of the Kïlauea summit area outlining the Powers Caldera

The Powers Caldera is a buried summit caldera of Kīlauea on the Big Island of Hawaii. It is the precursor to the modern but smaller Kīlauea Caldera, having formed about 2,200 years ago as a result of powerful phreatomagmatic eruptions. These explosive eruptions lasted for a period of about 1,200 years, during which the Uwēkahuna Ash Member was deposited. Sometime between 850 and 950 CE, the most powerful explosive eruption sent rocks weighing 9.7 lb (4.4 kg) at least 3 mi (4.8 km) from the summit. Golf ball-sized rocks fell at the coast, 11 mi (18 km) away.

Effusive eruptions began to fill the Powers Caldera with lava about 1,000 years ago, breaking the 1,200-year-long interval dominated by explosive eruptions. Lava completely filled the Powers Caldera and then overtopped its rim, solidifying the structure. This was followed by a period of voluminous tube-fed lava flows from 1000 to 1500 CE (including the ʻAilāʻau eruption), with the modern smaller Kīlauea Caldera having formed inside the buried Powers Caldera in about 1470 CE.

Evidence for the existence of the Powers Caldera is based largely on a fault scarp mantled by the Uwēkahuna Ash Member within Uwēkahuna Bluff and exposure of the Uwēkahuna Ash Member in the modern Kīlauea Caldera wall at an elevation more than 330 ft (100 m) lower than its occurrence beneath a surface flow near the Tree Molds. This implies that a large depression existed in the summit area of Kīlauea prior to deposition of the Uwēkahuna Ash Member. The boundaries of the Powers Caldera have been inferred by connecting concentric caldera fractures and faults about 2 km (1.2 mi) outside the modern Kīlauea Caldera rim. It is estimated that the Powers Caldera had a depth of at least 2,030 ft (620 m).

The Powers Caldera is named after Howard A. Powers, who conducted a careful field study of the Uwēkahuna Ash Member in 1948 and inferred the existence of the caldera.
