= Kīlauea =

Active volcano in Hawaii

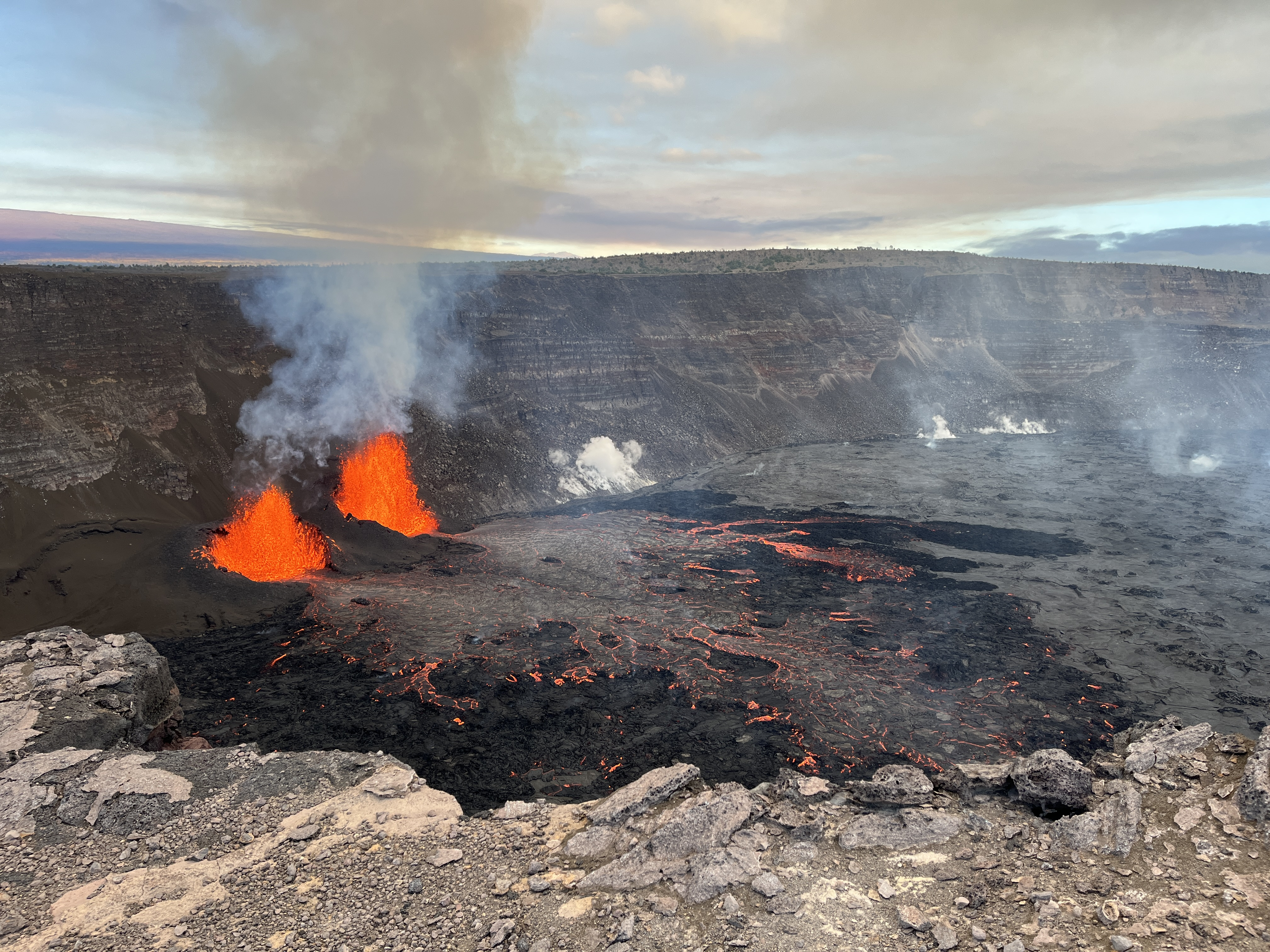
- Kīlauea erupting at Halemaʻumaʻu, a pit crater within its summit caldera, on January 16, 2025.

Highest point
- Elevation: 1,247 m (4,091 ft)
- Prominence: 15.3 m (50 ft)
- Coordinates: 19°25′16″N 155°17′12″W

Geography
- Location within Hawaii
- Location: Hawaiʻi, United States

Geology
- Rock age: 210,000 to 280,000 years old
- Mountain type(s): Shield volcano, hotspot volcano
- Volcanic zone: Hawaiian–Emperor seamount chain
- Last eruption: December 23, 2024 (ongoing, episodic)

Kīlauea (US: /ˌkɪləˈweɪə/ KIL-ə-WAY-ə, Hawaiian: [kiːlɐwˈwɛjə]) is an active shield volcano in the Hawaiian Islands, located along the southeastern shore of Hawaii Island. The volcano is between 210,000 and 280,000 years old and grew above sea level about 100,000 years ago. Since the islands were settled, it has been the most active of the five volcanoes that together form the island and among the most active volcanoes on Earth. The most recent eruption of Kīlauea began in December 2024 inside Halemaʻumaʻu, a pit crater located within Kīlauea's summit caldera, with episodic lava fountains and flows currently continuing inside the crater into late 2026.

Kīlauea is the second-youngest product of the Hawaiian hotspot and the current eruptive center of the Hawaiian–Emperor seamount chain. Because it lacks topographic prominence and its activities historically coincided with those of Mauna Loa, Kīlauea was once thought to be a satellite of its much larger neighbor. Kīlauea has a large, fairly recently formed caldera at its summit and two active rift zones, one extending 125 km (78 mi) east and the other 35 km (22 mi) west. An active fault of unknown depth moves vertically an average of 2 to 20 mm (0.1 to 0.8 in) per year.

Kīlauea erupted nearly continuously from vents on its eastern rift zone at Puʻu ʻŌʻō between January 1983 and April 2018, causing major property damage, including the destruction in 1990 of the towns of Kalapana and Kaimū along with the community's renowned black sand beach. Between 2008 and 2018, Halemaʻuma’u hosted an active lava lake.

Beginning in May 2018, activity shifted further downrift from the summit to the lower Puna district, when lava erupted from two dozen vents with eruptive fountains that sent rivers of lava into the ocean and covered substantial portions of Leilani Estates and Lanipuna Gardens, and destroyed the communities of Kapoho, Vacationland Hawaii, most of the Kapoho Beach Lots and Hawaii's largest natural freshwater lake. The County of Hawaii reported that 716 dwellings were destroyed. Concurrent with the 2018 activity downrift in lower Puna, the lava lake within Halemaʻumaʻu drained and a series of explosive collapse events occurred at the volcano's summit, with at least one explosion emitting ash 30,000 feet (9,100 m) into the air. This activity prompted a months-long closure of the Kīlauea section of Hawaii Volcanoes National Park. The destructive summit and lower Puna eruptions ended in September 2018.

== Background ==
Kīlauea is a Hawaiian word that means "spewing" or "much spreading", referring to its frequent outpouring of lava. Its earliest lavas date back to its submarine preshield stage. Samples were recovered by remotely operated underwater vehicles; samples of other flows were recovered as core samples. Lavas younger than 1,000 years old cover 90 percent of the volcano's surface. The oldest exposed lavas date back 2,800 years.

Radiocarbon and paleomagnetic dating identified a major eruption of Kīlauea around 1410, the first to be mentioned in Native Hawaiians' oral history. Western contact and written history began in 1778. The first documented eruption of Kīlauea came in 1823 with repeated eruptions thereafter. Most occurred at the volcano's summit or its eastern rift zone, and were prolonged and effusive. The geological record shows that pre-contact explosive activity was common; in 1790 one such eruption killed more than 400 people, making it the deadliest volcanic eruption in what became the United States.

Kīlauea's eruption from January 3, 1983, to 2018 was by far its longest-duration period of activity in modern times, as well as one of the longest-duration eruptions documented on Earth; as of January 2011, the eruption had produced 3.5 km^{3} (1 mi^{3}) of lava and resurfaced 123.2 km^{2} (48 mi^{2}) of land. Centuries prior to this event, the even larger ʻAilāʻau eruption of 1410 lasted about 60 years, ending in 1470 with an estimated volume of 4–6 km^{3} (0.96–1.44 cu mi).

Kīlauea's activity has a major impact on its mountainside ecology, where plant growth is often interrupted by fresh tephra and drifting volcanic sulfur dioxide, producing acid rains particularly in a barren area south of its southwestern rift zone known as the Kaʻū Desert. Nonetheless, wildlife flourishes left undisturbed elsewhere on the volcano and is highly endemic thanks to Kīlauea's (and the island of Hawaiʻi's) isolation from the nearest continental landmass. Historically, the island's five volcanoes were considered sacred by the Hawaiian people, and in Hawaiian mythology Halemaʻumaʻu served as the body and home of Pele, goddess of fire, lightning, wind, and volcanoes.

English missionary William Ellis gave the first modern account of Kīlauea and spent two weeks exploring the volcano. Since its foundation by Thomas Jaggar in 1912, the Hawaiian Volcano Observatory, for many years located on the rim of Kīlauea's summit caldera (Kaluapele), has served as the principal investigative and scientific body on the volcano and the island. In 1916, a bill forming Hawaii Volcanoes National Park was signed into law by President Woodrow Wilson. The park is a World Heritage Site and a major tourist destination, attracting roughly 2.6 million visitors annually.

== Geology ==
=== Setting ===
Location of Kīlauea on Hawaiʻi island

Like all Hawaiian volcanoes, Kīlauea was formed as the Pacific tectonic plate moved over the Hawaiian hotspot in the Earth's underlying mantle. Hawaii island volcanoes are the most recent evidence of this process that, over 70 million years, has produced the 6,000-kilometre-long (3,700-mile) Hawaiian–Emperor seamount chain. The prevailing view is that the hotspot has been largely stationary within the planet's mantle for much of the Cenozoic Era. However, while the Hawaiian mantle plume is well understood and extensively studied, the nature of hotspots themselves remains uncertain.

Kīlauea is one of five subaerial (originating under water) volcanoes that make up the island of Hawaii, originated from the Hawaiian hotspot. The oldest volcano on the island, Kohala, is more than a million years old, while Kīlauea, the youngest, is between 300,000 and 600,000 years of age. Kamaʻehuakanaloa ('the ruddy, reddish child of Kanaloa', formerly Lōʻihi), on the island's flank, is younger and has yet to breach the surface. Thus Kilauea is the second youngest volcano in the Hawaiian–Emperor seamount chain, a chain of shield volcanoes and seamounts extending from Hawaii to the Kuril–Kamchatka Trench in Russia.

Kīlauea started as a submarine volcano, gradually growing larger and taller via underwater eruptions of alkali basalt lava before emerging from the sea with a series of explosive eruptions about 50,000 to 100,000 years ago. Since then, the volcano's activity has produced a continual stream of effusive and explosive eruptions of roughly the same pattern as its activity since records began to be kept.

Hawaii island's oldest volcano, Kohala, experienced almost 900,000 years of activity before going extinct. Eruptions and explosive activity will make Kīlauea taller, build up its rift zones, and fill and refill Kaluapele.

=== Structure ===
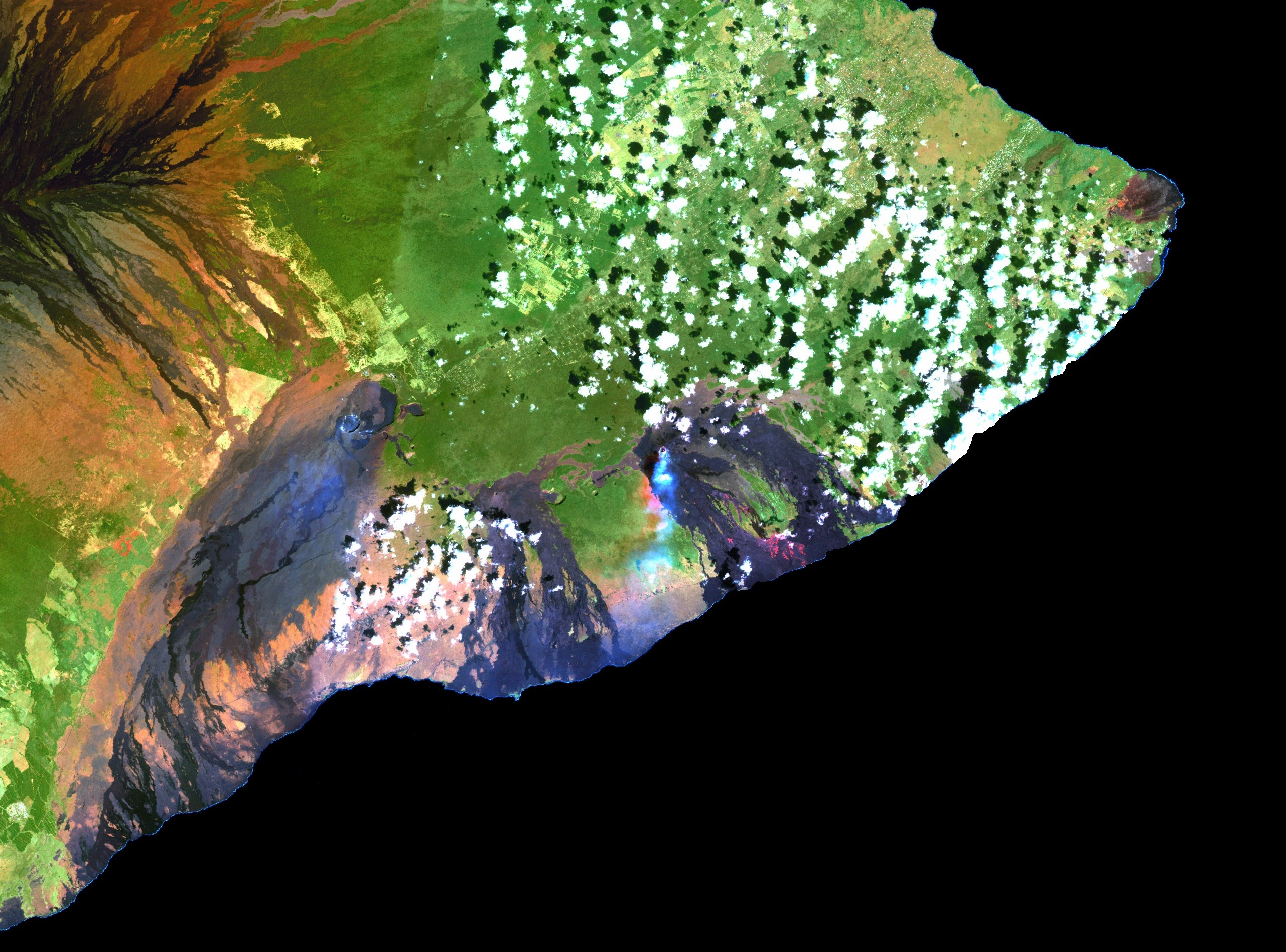
Simulated true-color Landsat mosaic

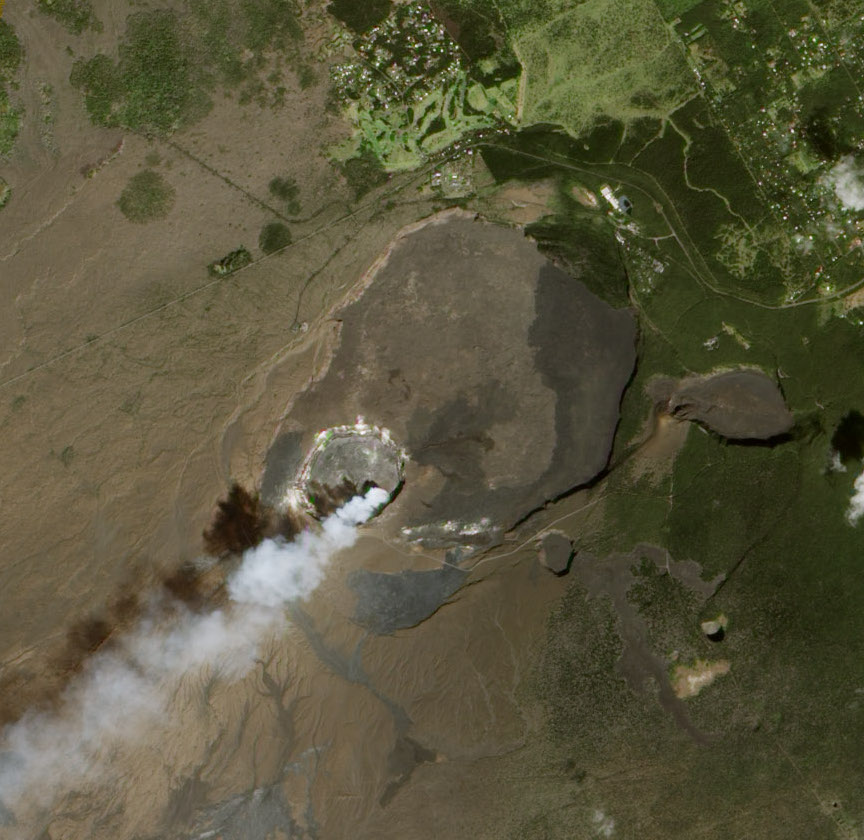
Kīlauea's summit caldera; volcanic gas can be seen rising out of Halemaʻumaʻu, within the caldera (January 2012)

Kīlauea has been active throughout its history. Cinder cones, satellite shields, lava tubes, and other eruptive structures are present, evidence of its recent activity. Since 1918, Kīlauea's longest pause lasted 18 years between 1934 and 1952. The bulk of Kīlauea consists of solidified lava flows, intermixed with volcanic ash and tephra produced by lower-volume explosive eruptions. Much of the volcano is covered in historical flows, while 90 percent of its surface is from the last 1,100 years. Much of its bulk remains underwater; its subaerial surface is a gently sloping, elongate, decentralized shield with a surface area of approximately 1,500 km^{2} (579 mi^{2}), making up 13.7 percent of the island's total surface area.

Kīlauea lacks topographical prominence, appearing only as a bulge on the southeastern flank of Mauna Loa. Native Hawaiians and early geologists considered it an active satellite of its host. However, lava analysis shows that the two have separate magma chambers. Nonetheless, high activity at one volcano roughly coincides with low activity at the other. When Kīlauea lay dormant between 1934 and 1952, Mauna Loa became active, and when the latter remained quiet from 1952 to 1974, the reverse was true. This is not always the case; the 1984 eruption of Mauna Loa started during an eruption at Kīlauea, but had no discernible effect on the Kīlauea eruption, and the ongoing inflation of Mauna Loa's summit, indicative of a future eruption, began the same day as new lava flows at Kīlauea's Puʻu ʻŌʻō crater. In 2002, Kilauea experienced a high-volume effusive episode at the same time that Mauna Loa began inflating. This unexpected communication is evidence of crustal-level interactions between them. Geologists suggested that "pulses" of magma entering Mauna Loa's deeper magma system may have increased pressure inside Kīlauea and triggered the concurrent eruptions. Mauna Loa began erupting on November 27, 2022, during Kīlauea's ongoing eruption, the first time since 1984 that both volcanoes were simultaneously erupting.

==== Kaluapele ====
Kīlauea has a large summit caldera named Kaluapele (the pit of Pele), measuring 4 by 3.2 km (2.5 by 2.0 mi) with walls up to 120 m (400 ft) high, breached by lava flows on the southwestern side. The age of Kaluapele is unknown, and it is possible that it has appeared and disappeared multiple times. Kaluapele likely formed over several centuries, beginning about 500 years ago, while its present form was finalized around 1470–1510 after a particularly powerful eruption from 1410 to 1470. A major feature within Kaluapele is Halemaʻumaʻu, a large pit crater and one of Kīlauea's most historically active eruption centers. The crater is approximately 920 m (3,018 ft) in diameter and 85 m (279 ft) deep, but its form has varied widely; its floor is mostly covered by flows from its 1974 eruption.

==== Rift zones ====
Kīlauea has two rift zones radiating from its summit, one leading 125 km (78 mi) out to the east, the other 35 km (22 mi) long and trending towards the southwest. A series of fault scarps connecting the rift zones form the Koaʻe Fault Zone. Tectonic extension along them is causing Kīlauea's bulk to slowly slide seaward off its southern flank at a rate of about 6 to 10 cm (2 to 4 in) per year, centered on a basal décollement fault 7 to 9 km (4 to 6 mi) beneath the volcano's surface. The eastern rift zone is a dominant feature on the volcano; it is almost entirely covered in lava from the last 400 years, and at its crest near the summit is 2 to 4 km (1 to 2 mi) wide. Non-localized eruptions, typical of rift zone activity, have produced a series of low-lying ridges down the majority of the east rift zone's length. Its upper segment is the most active section. It is the site of large pit craters. It reaches down Kīlauea's submerged flank to a depth of more than 5,000 m (16,400 ft). By contrast, the much smaller southwestern rift zone last had a rifting episode in 1974, and has not been active in the current eruptive cycle. The southwestern rift zone's extremity is underwater, although its subaerial length is more limited. The southwestern rift zone lacks a well-defined ridge line and pit craters, evidence that it is less active than the eastern rift zone.

==== Hilina fault system ====
A prominent structure on Kīlauea's southern flank is the Hilina fault system, an active fault slipping vertically an average of 2 to 20 mm (1/16 to 13/16 in) per year. Its physiographic province is 500 m (1,640 ft) deep, but it is unknown whether it is a shallow listric fault or penetrates deeply.

== Eruptive history ==
All historical eruptions occurred at either Kaluapele, the eastern rift zone, or the southwestern rift zone. Half of Kīlauea's historical eruptions have occurred at or near Kaluapele. Activity there was nearly continuous for much of the 19th century, capped by an explosive eruption in 1924, before petering out by 1934. Later activity mostly shifted to the eastern rift zone, the site of 24 historical eruptions, located mostly on its upper section. By contrast, the southwestern rift zone remained relatively quiet, hosting five events.

Graph summarizing the eruptions of Kïlauea during the past 200 years. The Pu‘u ‘Ö‘ö- Kupaianaha eruption has continued into the 21st century. Information is sketchy for eruptions before 1823, when the first missionaries arrived on the Island of Hawai‘i. The total duration of eruptive activity in a given year, shown by the length of the vertical bar, may be for a single eruption or a combination of several separate eruptions.

=== Prehistoric eruptions ===
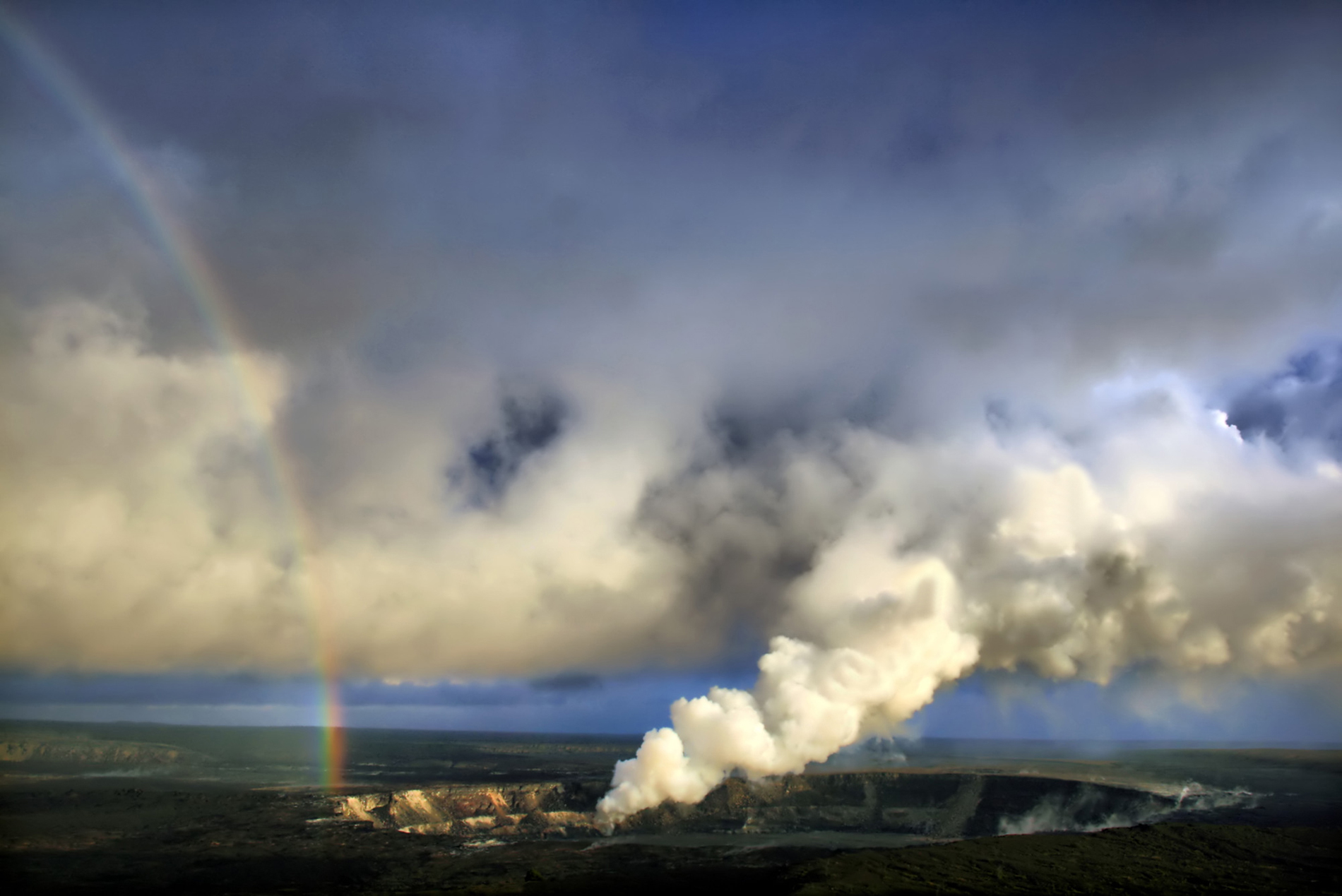
Rainbow and volcanic ash with sulfur dioxide emissions from Halemaʻumaʻu (April 2008)

Geologists dated and documented dozens of major eruptions over the volcano's history, bridging the gap between Kīlauea's oldest known rock and written records and historical observation. Lava flows are generally recovered by scientists in one of three ways. The oldest flows, 275,000 to 225,000 years ago, were recovered from Kīlauea's submerged southern slope by remotely operated vehicles. These lavas exhibit forms characteristic of early, submerged preshield-stage eruptive episodes, from when the volcano was a rising seamount yet to breach the ocean surface, and their surface exposure is unusual, as in most other volcanoes such lavas would have since been buried by later flows.

The second method is by drilling core samples; however, the cores are difficult to date. Paleomagnetic dating, limited to rocks dating from after Kīlauea's emergence from the sea, suggested ages of around 50,000 years. Exposed flows above sea level are younger. Some of the oldest reliably dated rock is 43,000 years old. It comes from charcoal sandwiched beneath an ash layer on a fault scarp known as Hilina Pali; however, samples dated from higher up the scarp indicate ash deposition at an average rate of 6 m (20 ft) per thousand years, indicating that the oldest exposed flows, from the base of the feature, could date back as far as 70,000 years. This date is similar to that of the oldest dated extant lava flow, a southwestern rift zone flow with uncorrected radiocarbon dating of approximately 4650 BC.

The oldest well-studied eruptive product from Kīlauea is the Uwēkahuna Ash Member, the product of explosive eruptions from 800 to 100 BC. Although it was mostly buried by younger flows, it remained exposed in some places, and was traced more than 20 km (12 mi) from Kaluapele, evidence of powerful eruptions. Evidence suggests the existence of an active eruptive center at this time, termed the Powers Caldera, whose fractures and faults lie 2 km (1 mi) outside Kaluapele. At least 1,200 years ago, lava from the Powers Caldera overtopped its rim and solidified the structure; this was followed by a period of voluminous tube-fed pāhoehoe flows from the summit. Following the end of activity around 1600 CE, eruptions moved to the eastern part of Kīlauea's summit, and concurrently activity increased at the northern end of the eastern rift zone.

=== 1410 to 1790 ===
The longest-duration major eruption witnessed by Native Hawaiians took place from about 1410 to 1470. Lasting around 60 years, the ʻAilāʻau eruption's effusive flow covered most of Kīlauea, north of the East Rift Zone in what became the Puna District. Most likely due to the duration of this flow, the summit collapsed around 1470–1510, creating Kaluapele. These discoveries and the collapse of the summit were supplemented by translations of Native Hawaiian chants on the mythology of Pele and Hiʻiaka; these events were interpreted from this story.

After arriving in Hawaii, Pele made Kīlauea her home. She sent her sister Hiʻiaka to retrieve Lohiʻau, an attractive man she met on Kauaʻi, on the condition that Pele protect the forests of Puna if Hiʻiaka returned in 40 days. As the journey lasted longer than 40 days, Pele set fire to the forest. When Hiʻiaka finally returned with Lohiʻau and made the smoky discovery, she became angry and had sex with Lohiʻau right in front of Pele. In retaliation, Pele then killed Lohiʻau before throwing him in a pit on the summit of Kīlauea. Hiʻiaka started digging ferociously to recover his body, letting rocks fly everywhere.

These events are interpreted to describe the ʻAilāʻau flow. In addition to Hawaiian oral history, geologists studied and confirmed them with radiocarbon and paleomagnetic dating.

Kīlauea then entered a 300-year period of explosive eruptions from around 1510 to 1790 as discovered by the radiocarbon dating of the Keanakākoʻi (the cave in which adzes were made) Tephra. This tephra was formed after lava erupted hundreds of meters into the sky and spread ash across the area.

=== 1790 to 1934 ===
The earliest reliable written records date to about 1820, and the first eruption well-documented by westerners occurred in 1823. One pre-contact eruption in particular, a phreatomagmatic event in 1790, was responsible for the death of a party of warriors, part of the army of Keōua Kuahuʻula, the last Hawaii island chief to resist Kamehameha I's rule; their death is evidenced by footprints preserved within the Hawai‘i Volcanoes National Park - it is listed on the National Register of Historic Places. Kīlauea was the site of 61 separate eruptions between 1823 and 2024, making it one of Earth's most active volcanoes.

The volume of lava expelled by Kīlauea varied widely across eruptions. After 1823 Kaluapele gradually filled, filling up under nearly continuous summit eruption, with 3 km^{3} (1 mi^{3}) of lava released by 1840. The period between 1840 and 1920 saw approximately half that in lava volume. In the thirty years between then and about 1950, the volcano was unusually quiet and exhibited little activity; Kīlauea's eruptive volume increased steadily thereafter, with activity comparable to that of the early 1800s.

The length and origin of these eruptions varied. Events lasted anywhere between days and years, and occurred at a number of different sites. Activity around Kaluapele was nearly continuous for much of the 19th century, and after a reprieve between 1894 and 1907, continued until 1924.

Effusive eruptions are of relatively recent vintage there. Prior to the arrival of Europeans, Kīlauea was the site of regular explosive activity, evidenced by tribal chants.

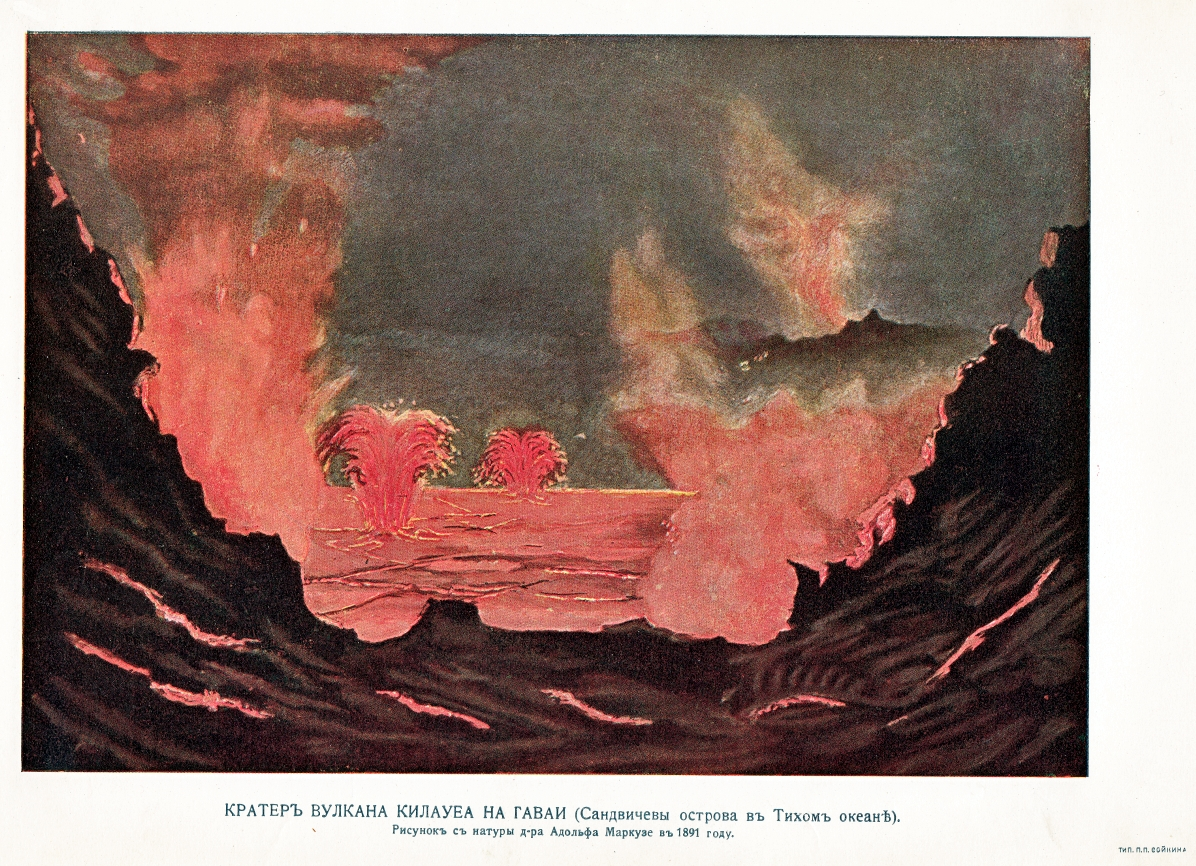
Painting of the 1891 eruption

Kīlauea erupted in 1823 and 1832, but the first major eruption after 1790 occurred in 1840, when its eastern rift zone became the site of a large, effusive Hawaiian eruption over 35 km (22 mi) of its length, unusually long even for a rift eruption. The eruption lasted for 26 days and produced an estimated 205 to 265 million cubic meters of lava; the light generated by the event was so intense that one could reportedly read a newspaper in Hilo at night, 30 km (19 mi) away.

The volcano was active again in 1868, 1877, 1884, 1885, 1894, and 1918, before its next major eruption in 1918–1919. Halemaʻumaʻu, then a small upwelling in Kaluapele floor, was topped by a lava lake that then drained and refilled, forming a lava lake and nearly reaching the top edge of Kaluapele before draining once more. This activity eventually gave way to the construction of Mauna Iki, building up the lava shield on the volcano's southwest rift zone over eight months. The eruption featured concurrent rift activity and lava fountaining.

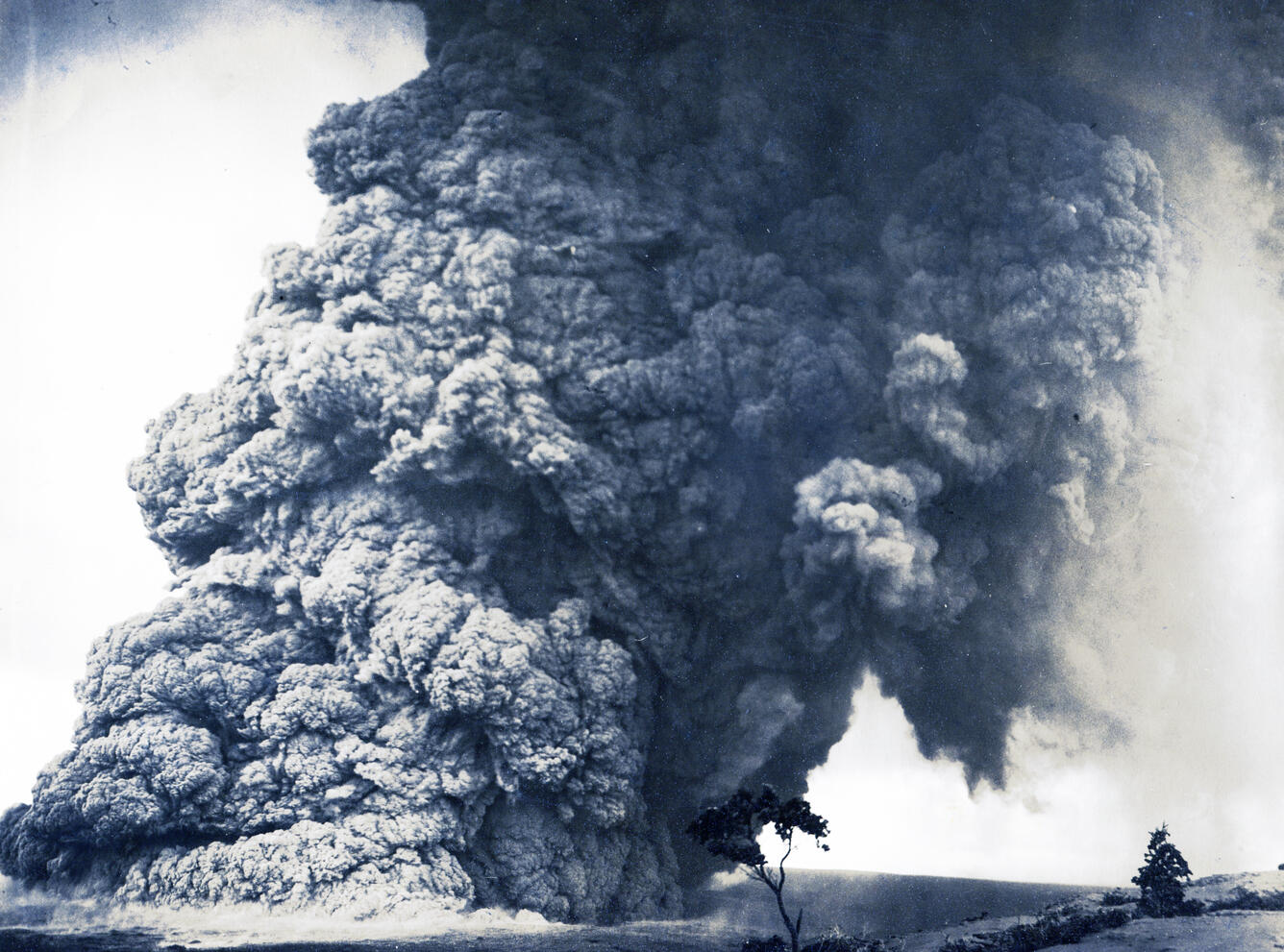
An explosive eruption column from Halema‘uma‘u crater on May 18, 1924. One of many in May 11–27, 1924.

Activity in 1921–1923 followed. The next major eruption occurred in 1924. Halemaʻumaʻu first drained, then quickly began sinking, deepening to nearly 210 m (689 ft) beneath a thick cloud of volcanic ash. Explosive activity began on May 10, blowing out rock chunks weighing as much as 45 kg (99 lb) 60 m (197 ft), and smaller fragments weighing about 9 kg (20 lb) as far as 270 m (886 ft). After a brief reprieve, the eruption intensified through a major blast on May 18, when an enormous explosive event caused the eruption's only fatality. The eruption continued and formed numerous eruption columns above 9 km (6 mi) in height, declining and ending by May 28. Volcanic activity was soon confined to the summit, and ended after 1934. From 1823 to 1924, the volcano erupted 15 times, with an additional 11 subsidence events occurring at the summit.

=== 1952 to 1982 ===
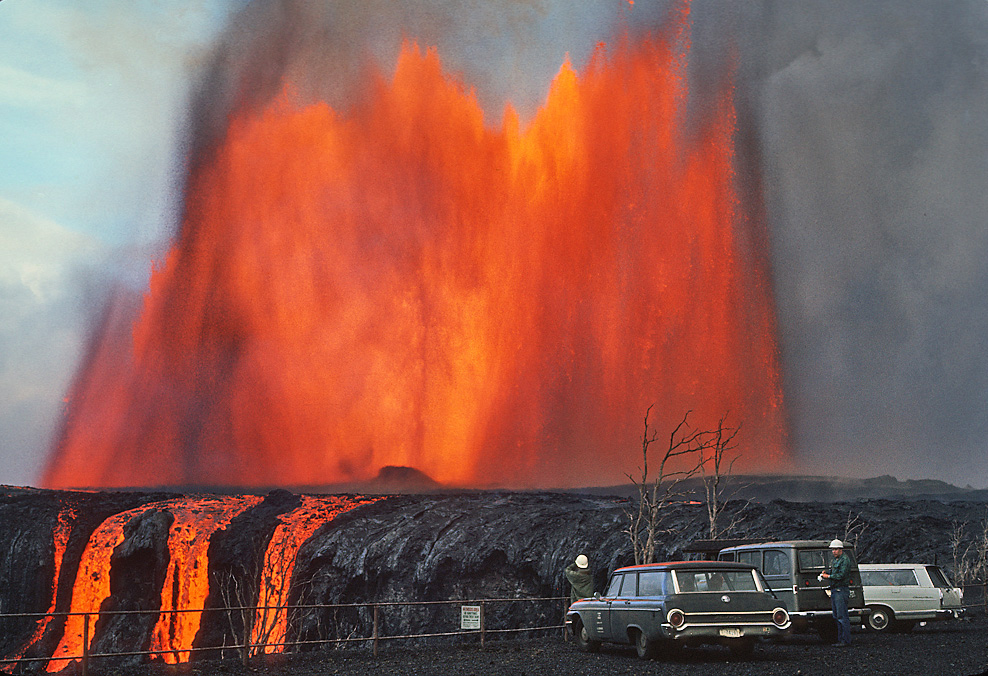
The Mauna Ulu eruption of 1969 generated a 300-metre (1,000 ft)-high lava fountain

After the Halemaʻumaʻu event, Kīlauea remained relatively quiet, and for a time, completely silent, with activity confined to the summit. The volcano came alive again in 1952, with a lava fountain 245 m (800 ft) high at Halemaʻumaʻu. Multiple continuous lava fountains between 15 and 30 m (50 and 100 ft) persisted, and the eruption lasted 136 days. Eruptions followed in 1954, 1955, and 1959, capped by a large event in 1960, when fissure-based phreatic eruption and earthquake activity gave way to a massive ʻaʻā flow overran evacuated communities and resorts; the resulting summit deflation eventually caused Halemaʻumaʻu to collapse even further.

After 1960 eruptive events occurred frequently until August 2018. The period 1967–1968 saw a particularly large, 80-million-cubic-meter, 251-day event from Halemaʻumaʻu. In 1969 the marathon Mauna Ulu eruption was an effusive eruption that lasted from May 24, 1969, to July 24, 1974, and added 230 acres (93 ha) of land to the island. Afterwards a magnitude 7.2 earthquake caused a partial summit collapse, after which activity paused until 1977. At the time, Mauna Ulu was the longest flank recorded eruption of any Hawaiian volcano. The eruption formed a new vent, covered a large area of land with lava, and enlarged the island. The eruption started as a fissure between two pit craters, ʻĀloʻi and ʻAlae, where the Mauna Ulu shield eventually formed. Both pāhoehoe and ʻaʻā lava erupted from the volcano. Fountains of lava surged as much as 540 meters (1772 ft) into the air. In early 1973, an earthquake occurred that caused Kīlauea to briefly stop erupting near Mauna Ulu and instead erupt near the craters Pauahi and Hiʻiaka.

=== 1983–2018 ===
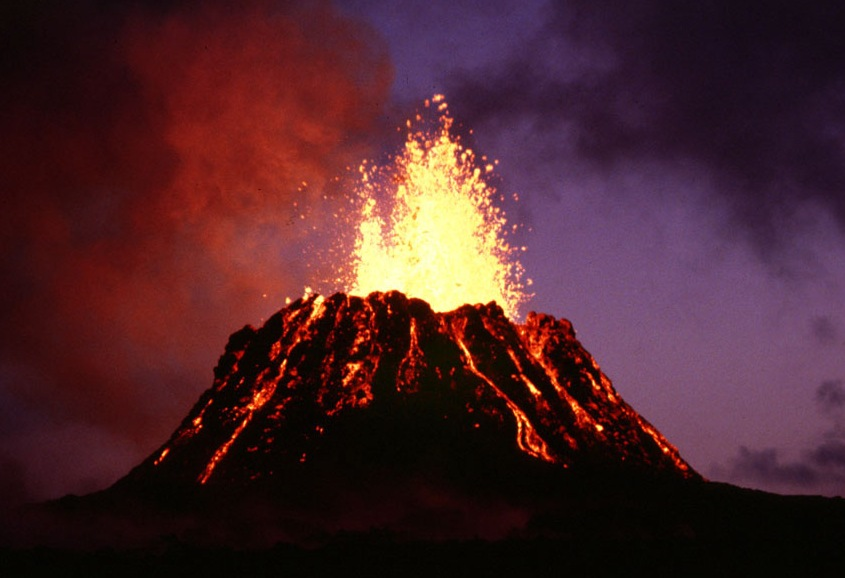
Puʻu ʻŌʻō at dusk, June 1983

Another eruption occurred from January 1983 to September 2018. It had the longest duration of any observed eruption at this volcano. As of December 2020, it was the twelfth-longest duration volcanic eruption on Earth since 1750. The eruption began on January 3, 1983, along the eastern rift zone. The vent produced lava fountains that quickly built up into the Puʻu ʻŌʻō cone, sending lava flows downslope.

In 1986, activity shifted down the rift to a new vent, named Kūpaʻianahā, where it took on a more effusive character. Kūpaʻianahā built up a low, broad volcanic shield, and lava tubes fed flows extending 11 to 12 km (about 7 mi) to the sea. Between 1986 and 1991, the connection between Chain of Craters Road and Hawaii Route 130 was cut, and the community of Kapa’ahu, the village of Kalapana, and the subdivisions of Kālapana Gardens and Royal Gardens were lost to the lava. A black sand beach at Kaimū was engulfed. In 1992, the eruption moved back to Puʻu ʻŌʻō, but continued in the same manner, covering nearly all of the 1983–86 lava flows and large areas of coastline.

As of the end of 2016, the east rift zone eruption had produced 4.4 km^{3} (1 mi^{3}) of lava, covered 144 km^{2} (56 mi^{2}) of land, added 179 ha (442 acres) of land to the island, destroyed 215 structures, and buried 14.3 km (9 mi) of highway under lava as thick as 35 m (115 ft).

In addition to the nearly continuous activity at Puʻu ʻOʻo and other vents on the east rift zone, a separate eruption began at Kilauea's summit in March 2008. On March 19, 2008, following several months of increased sulfur dioxide emissions and seismic tremor, a new vent opened at Halemaʻumaʻu. Following this event, a new crater formed in the explosion, informally named the "Overlook Crater," emitting a thick gas plume that obscured views into the vent. Explosive events occurred at the vent throughout 2008.

On September 5, 2008, scientists observed a lava pond deep within the Overlook Crater for the first time. Beginning in February 2010, a lava pond was visible at the bottom of the crater almost continuously through the beginning of May 2018. Lava briefly overflowed the vent onto the floor of Halemaʻumaʻu in April and May 2015, October 2016, and April 2018.

==== 2018 eruptive episodes ====
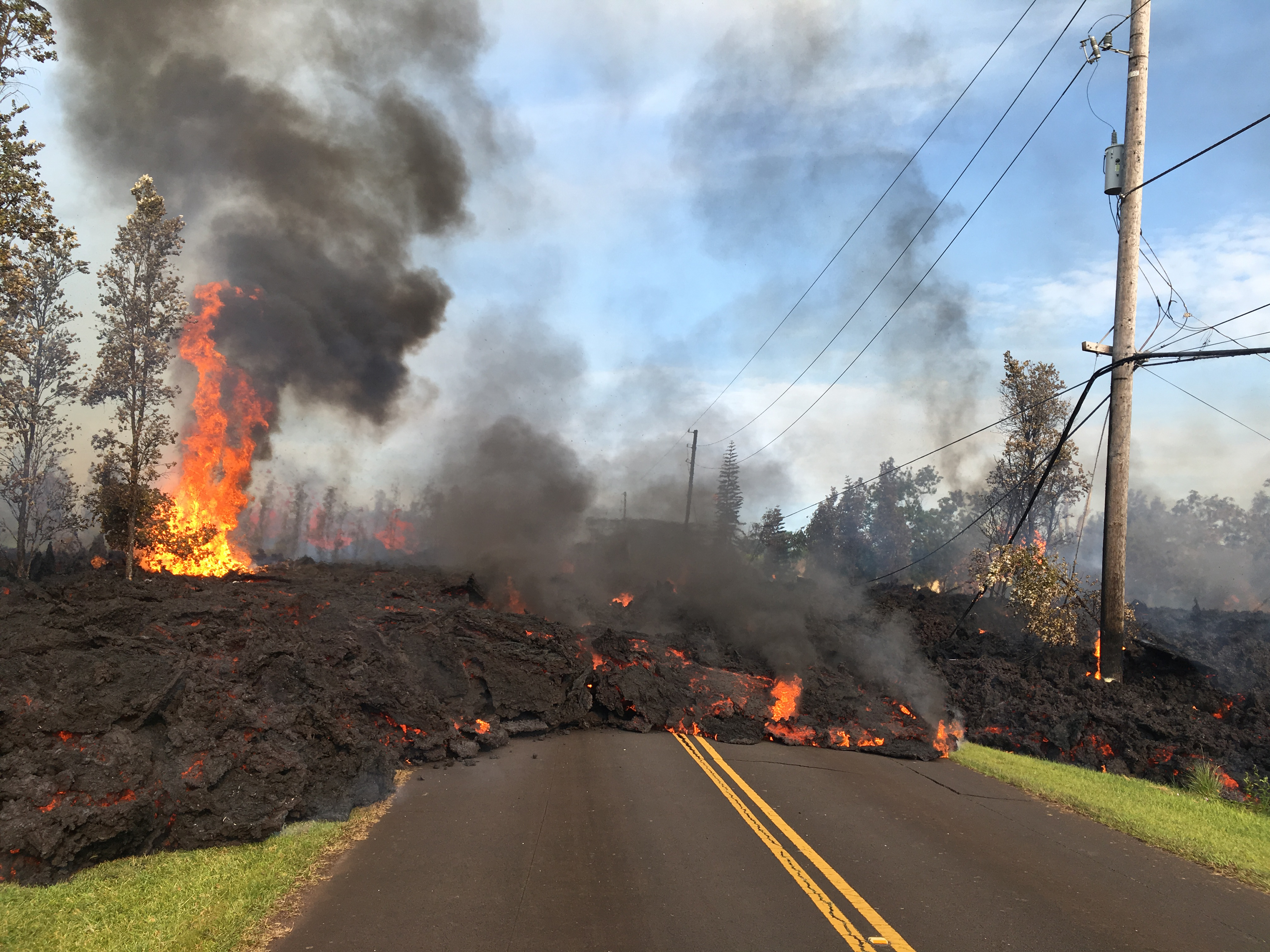
Lava from a fissure slowly advanced to the northeast on Hoʻokupu Street in Leilani Estates subdivision (May 5, 2018)

Beginning in March 2018, Hawaiian Volcano Observatory began to detect rapid inflation at Pu‘u ‘Ō‘ō, leading scientists to warn that the increased pressure could form a new vent at Kilauea.

Following weeks of increased pressure, the crater floor of the cone of Puʻu ʻŌʻō collapsed on April 30, 2018, as magma migrated underground into the lower Puna region of Kilauea's lower east rift zone. Over the next few days, hundreds of small earthquakes were detected on Kīlauea's East rift zone, leading officials to issue evacuation warnings. On May 3, 2018, new fissures formed, and lava began erupting in lower Puna after a 5.0 earthquake earlier in the day, causing evacuations of the Leilani Estates and Lanipuna Gardens subdivisions.

A seemingly related 6.9 magnitude earthquake occurred on May 4. By May 9, 27 houses had been destroyed in Leilani Estates.

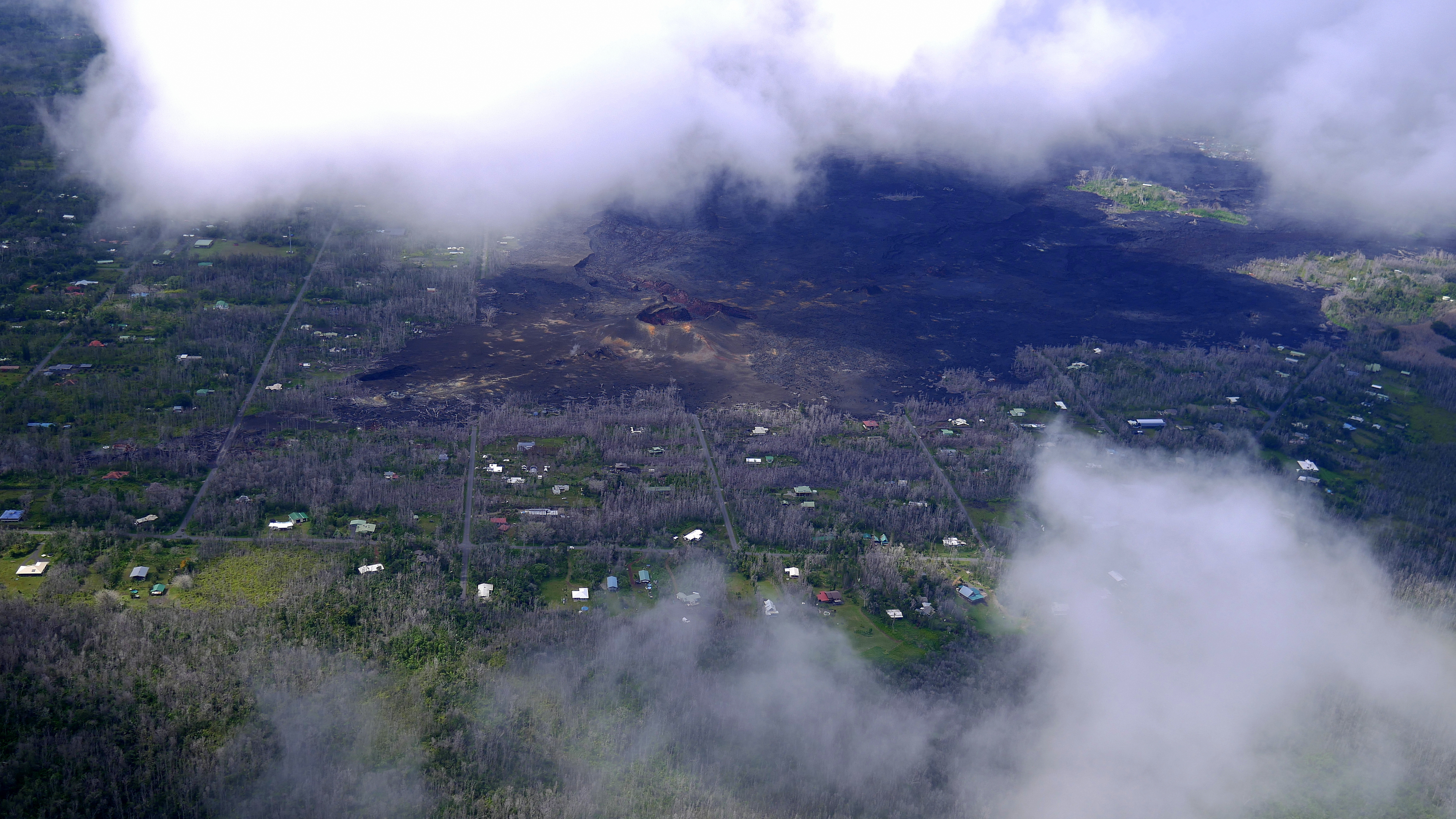
Kilauea Volcano Fissure 8 captured on May 3rd, 2019

By May 21, two lava flows had reached the Pacific Ocean, creating thick clouds of laze (a toxic lava and haze cloud made up of hydrochloric acid and glass particles).

By May 31, lava had destroyed 87 houses in Leilani Estates and nearby areas, accompanied by additional evacuation orders, including for the town of Kapoho. By June 4, the lava had crossed through Kapoho and entered the ocean. The confirmed number of houses lost reached 159, then two weeks later, 533, and ultimately 657.

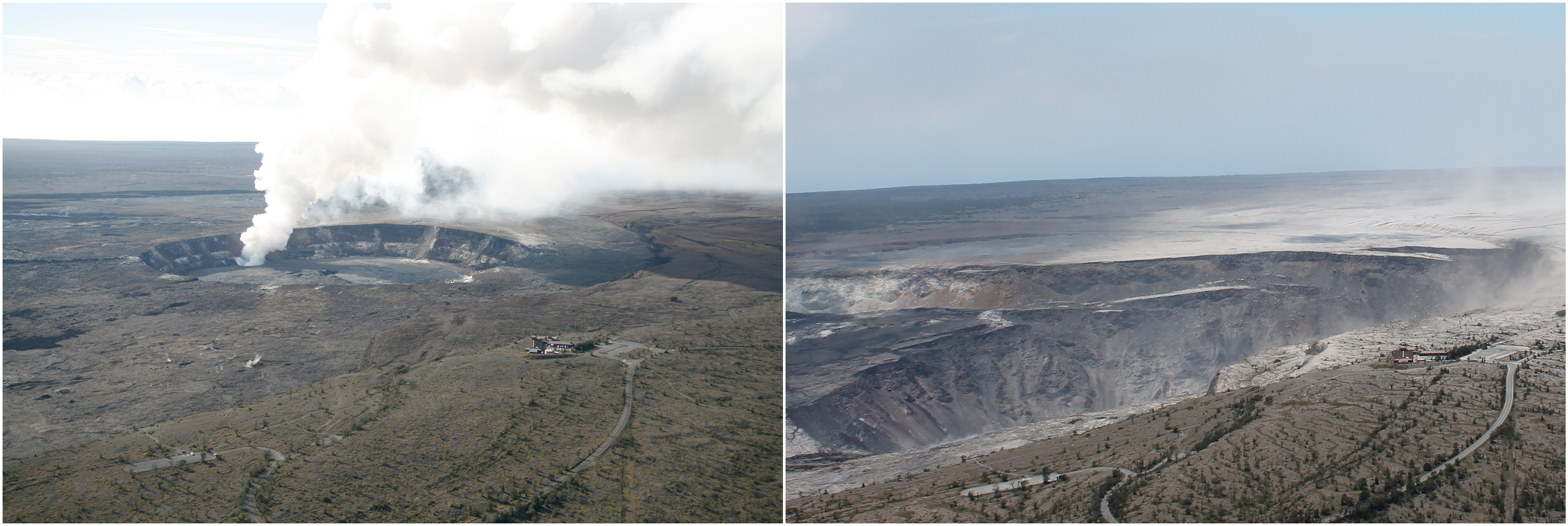
Two views of Halemaʻumaʻu from roughly the same vantage point. At left is the view from 2008, with a distinct gas plume from the Overlook vent, the location of what would become a long-lived lava lake. At right is a view of Halemaʻumaʻu after the eruptive events of 2018, showing the collapsed crater.

The lava lake at Halemaʻumaʻu began to drop on May 2. The Hawaiian Volcano Observatory warned that this increased the potential for phreatic (steam) explosions at the summit caused by interaction of magma with the underground water table, similar to the explosions that occurred at Halemaʻumaʻu in 1924. These concerns prompted the closure of Hawaiʻi Volcanoes National Park. On May 17, at approximately 4:15 a.m., an explosive eruption occurred at Halemaʻumaʻu, creating a plume of ash 30,000 feet into the air. This marked the beginning of a series of vigorous explosions that produced significant ash plumes from Halemaʻumaʻu. These explosions, accompanied by large earthquakes and inward slumping and collapse within and around Halemaʻumaʻu, continued until early August.

=== 2019–20: Water lake appears at the summit ===
In late July 2019, a water lake appeared on the bottom of Halemaʻumaʻu for the first time in over 200 years, as water from the rebounding water table began to enter the crater. The crater lake gradually grew in size. On December 1, 2020, the lake was approximately 49 metres (161 ft) deep. Meanwhile, the temperature of the lake's surface, as measured by a thermal camera, generally measured between 70–85 °C (158–185 °F). Within a month, the water lake was replaced by a lava lake during the new eruption.

=== December 2020 – May 2021 summit eruption ===
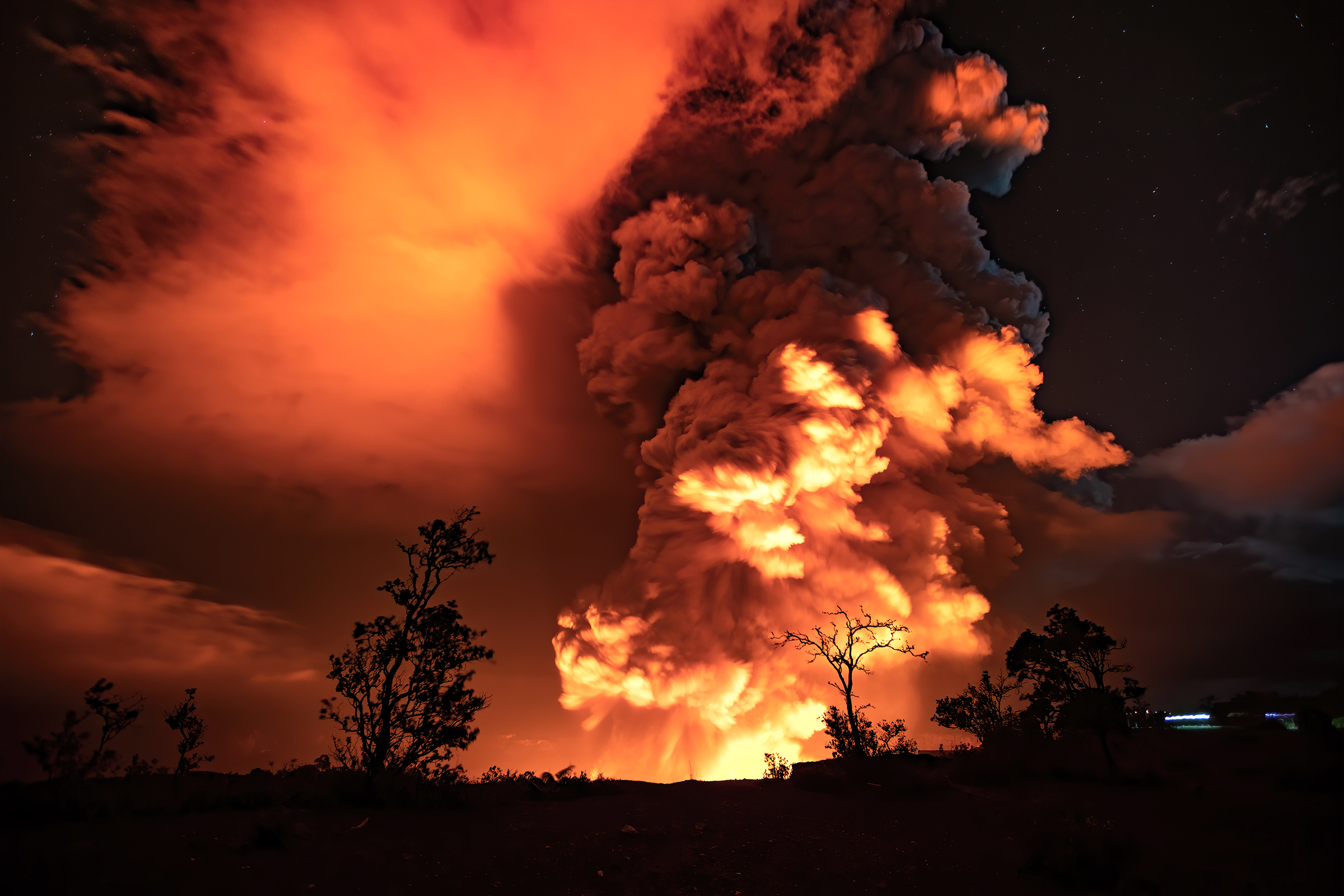
View of the eruption from outside Kaluapele, on December 20, 2020

On December 20, 2020, at 9:30 pm local time, an eruption broke out within Halemaʻumaʻu. The Hawaiian Volcano Observatory reported that three vents were feeding lava into the bottom of Halemaʻumaʻu Crater, boiling off the water lake that had been growing since summer 2019 and replacing it with a lava lake. The eruption produced a plume that reached 30,000 feet (9,144 m) in the air. The eruption was preceded by earthquake swarms centered at Kaluapele on November 30, 2020, and December 2, 2020, the second of which was interpreted as a small intrusion of magma. By the following morning, the eruption had stabilized. Two of the three vents remained active and continued to fill the floor with lava. By 7:30 a.m. on December 25, 2020, the lava lake had filled in 176 metres (577 ft) of the crater, On January 8, 2021, depth had increased to 636 feet (194 m), and by February 24 to 216 metres (709 ft). A spatter cone had formed around the western vent.

The eruption continued for another few months, with decreasing activity. On May 26, 2021, it was no longer erupting. Lava supply appeared to have ceased between May 11 and May 13, and the lake had crusted over by May 20. The last surface activity in Halemaʻumaʻu was observed on May 23. When activity ceased, the lava lake was 229 metres (751 ft) deep.

On August 23, 2021, the Hawaiian Volcano Observatory raised Kīlauea's alert status from "Yellow/Advisory" to "Orange/Watch" due to an earthquake swarm and a concurrent increase in ground deformation at the summit. The observatory returned Kīlauea's alert status to "Yellow/Advisory" two days later.

=== September 2021 summit eruption ===
Eruptive activity within Halemaʻumaʻu crater in January 2023

The Hawaiian Volcano Observatory recorded increased earthquake activity and changes in ground deformation patterns at Kīlauea's summit at about noon local time on September 29, 2021. An eruption began at 3:20 p.m. local time when several fissures opened within Halemaʻumaʻu crater. During the initial stages of the eruption, lava erupted in fountains more than 200 feet (61 m) tall. The fountain heights declined as the level of lava in the crater rose, partially drowning the erupting vents.

Lava continued to erupt at Halemaʻumaʻu throughout the fall. Overflight measurements from October 5, 2022, indicated that 111 million m^{3} (29 billion U.S. gal) of lava had been effused, and that the floor of Halemaʻumaʻu had risen 143 meters (469 ft), since the beginning of this eruption. The eruption paused on December 9, and the alert level was reduced accordingly on December 13, 2022, though seismic activity was still unsettled.

=== 2023 summit eruptions ===
Eruptive activity within Halemaʻumaʻu resumed on January 5, 2023. The eruption ended 61 days later on March 7, 2023.

On June 7, 2023, the Hawaiian Volcano Observatory detected a glow in web camera images atop Kilauea, indicating that an eruption had begun in the Halemaʻumaʻu crater, within Hawaii Volcanoes National Park. The eruptive episode ended after twelve days on June 19, 2023.

2023's third Halemaʻumaʻu eruption episode occurred from September 10 to September 16, 2023, when multiple vents opened.

=== 2024–2026 rift and summit eruptions ===
Shortly after midnight on June 3, 2024, an eruption occurred from a series of fissures on Kīlauea's upper southwest rift zone. The eruption lasted about 8.5 hours.

A second eruption took place between September 15 and September 20, 2024, near and within Nāpau Crater, a pit crater located in a remote and uninhabited part of the volcano's middle east rift. The eruption had four eruptive phases between September 15 and September 20. The final eruptive activity from a small vent west of Nāpau Crater ended at about 10 AM HST on September 20.

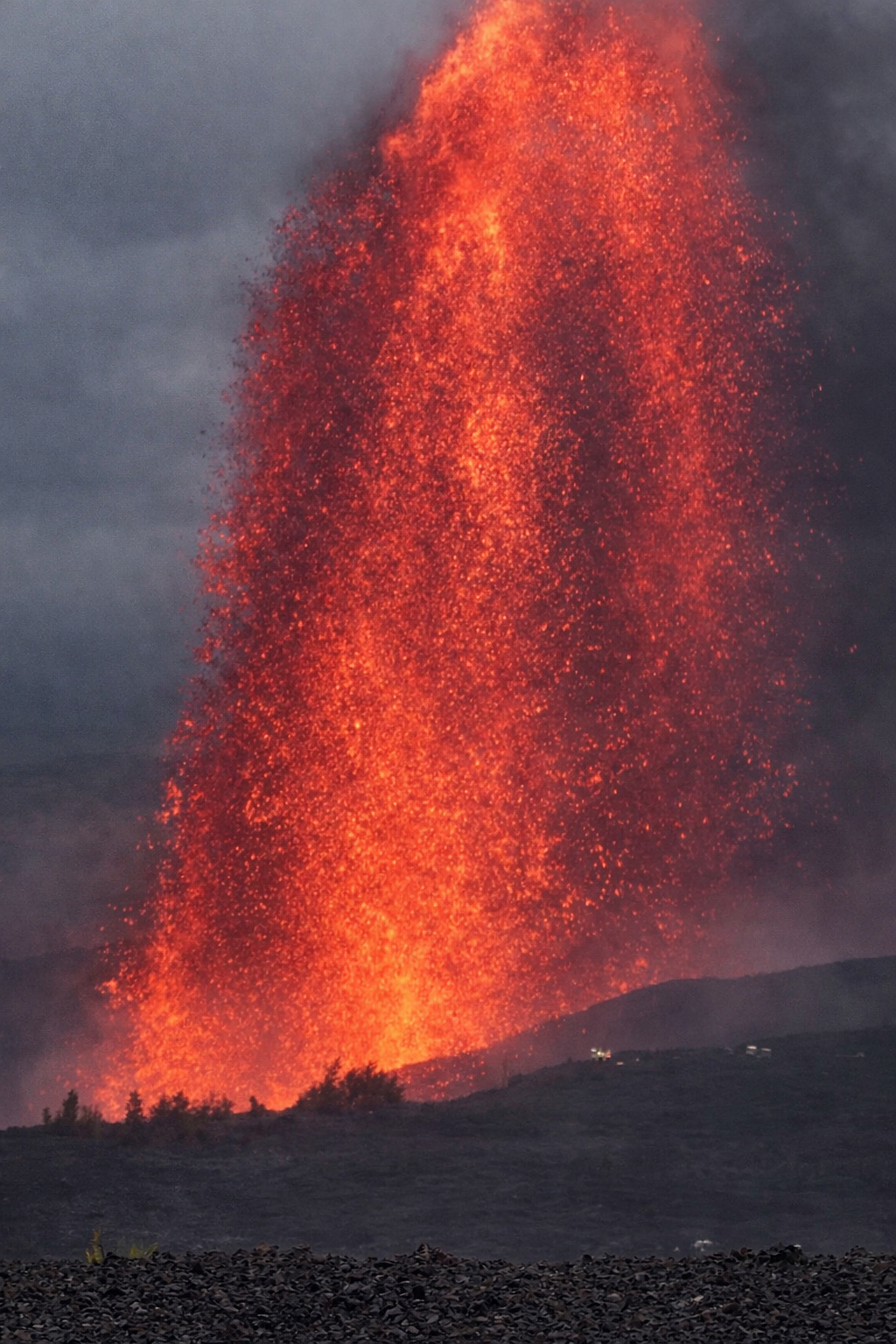
Explosive strombolian lava fountain during Episode 42 on February 15, 2026

On December 23, 2024, an eruption began within Halemaʻumaʻu. The eruption continued into 2025, with episodic lava fountains reaching heights of 600 feet (180 m) in March 2025, 1,150 feet (350 m), and 1,200 feet (370 m) in July. That May, the National Park Service reopened the public viewing area at Uēkahuna on the caldera rim, the former site of the Hawaii Volcano Observatory facilities and the Jaggar Museum. Initially, Episode 35 produced the highest lava fountains observed, at heights of 1,500 feet (460 m). Episode 38 of the eruption began on December 6, becoming the most active phase of this eruption so far, with lava flow rates as high as 1,000–1,200 cubic yards (760–920 m^{3}) per second observed. This was followed by Episode 39 later that month. By the end of the year, Kīlauea had produced a total of 53 billion US gallons (200,000,000 m^{3}) of lava, from two vents at the southwestern floor of Halemaʻumaʻu.

Kilauea's 40th episode of the eruption that started in December 2024, featuring intermittent high lava fountains, began on the morning of January 12, 2026.

Episode 41 was active for 8 hours and 18 minutes on January 24, 2026. Episode 42 lasted just under 10 hours on February 15, 2026. Episode 43 lasted approximately 9 hours on March 10, 2026, produced the highest lava fountains of this eruption so far at 1,770 feet (540 m), and generated significant tephra fall across Hawaiʻi Volcanoes National Park and nearby communities. The eruption prompted elevated alert levels, road closures, and ashfall warnings as winds carried ash, Pele's hair, and tephra to Puna, Hilo, and the Hamakua Coast.

These paroxysmal eruptions are very similar to the fountaining episodes in Kīlauea Iki in 1959, Mauna Ulu in 1969, and Puʻu ʻŌʻō in 1983–1986. They are also quite similar to Etna's paroxysms, in which lava fountains are shot thousands of meters into the sky alongside ash plumes, often feeding fast moving lava flows. The eruption type associated with these events are termed violent strombolian.

== Hazards ==
In 2018, the USGS National Volcanic Threat Assessment gave Kīlauea an overall threat score of 263, and ranked it the most likely volcano in the United States to threaten lives and infrastructure.

=== Volcanic Explosivity Index ===
The Global Volcanism Program assigned a Volcanic Explosivity Index (VEI; the higher the number, the more explosive) to 90 of Kīlauea's 96 known eruptions of the last 11,700 years. The eruption of 1790 received a VEI of 4. The 1983–2018 eruption was marked 3. The eruptions of 1820, 1924, 1959 and 1960 received 2s. The eruptions of 680, 1050, 1490, 1500, 1610, 1868 and four eruptions in 1961 scored a 1. The other seventy-four stayed at 0.

Volcanic Explosivity Index for Kīlauea
VEI	Number of Holocene eruptions for which a VEI has been assigned (total=91)
VEI 0	75
VEI 1	10
VEI 2	4
VEI 3	1
VEI 4	1

=== Oral traditions ===
Native Hawaiians have passed down ancient oral traditions surrounding the volcanoes ever since they settled on the islands. These oral histories provide rich cultural and geologic knowledge. In the field of volcanology, the use of oral history emerged from obscurity to become a resource for understanding the eruption history of a given region. While oral history has been used to confirm previously known geologic data, it can be used to assess hazards surrounding an eruption, in addition to guiding the rehabilitation of affected communities.

Using the oral history of the ʻAilāʻau eruption, volcanologists learned that Kīlauea was much more explosive than previously thought. Given its eruption history, the tradition predicts a long period of explosive eruptions. Hawaiian chants provided clues that surface water had been found at the summit in earlier times. The story of Pele and Hiʻiaka recorded extensive lava flows, as well as a collapse of Kaluapele in about 1500.

== Ecology ==
=== Background ===
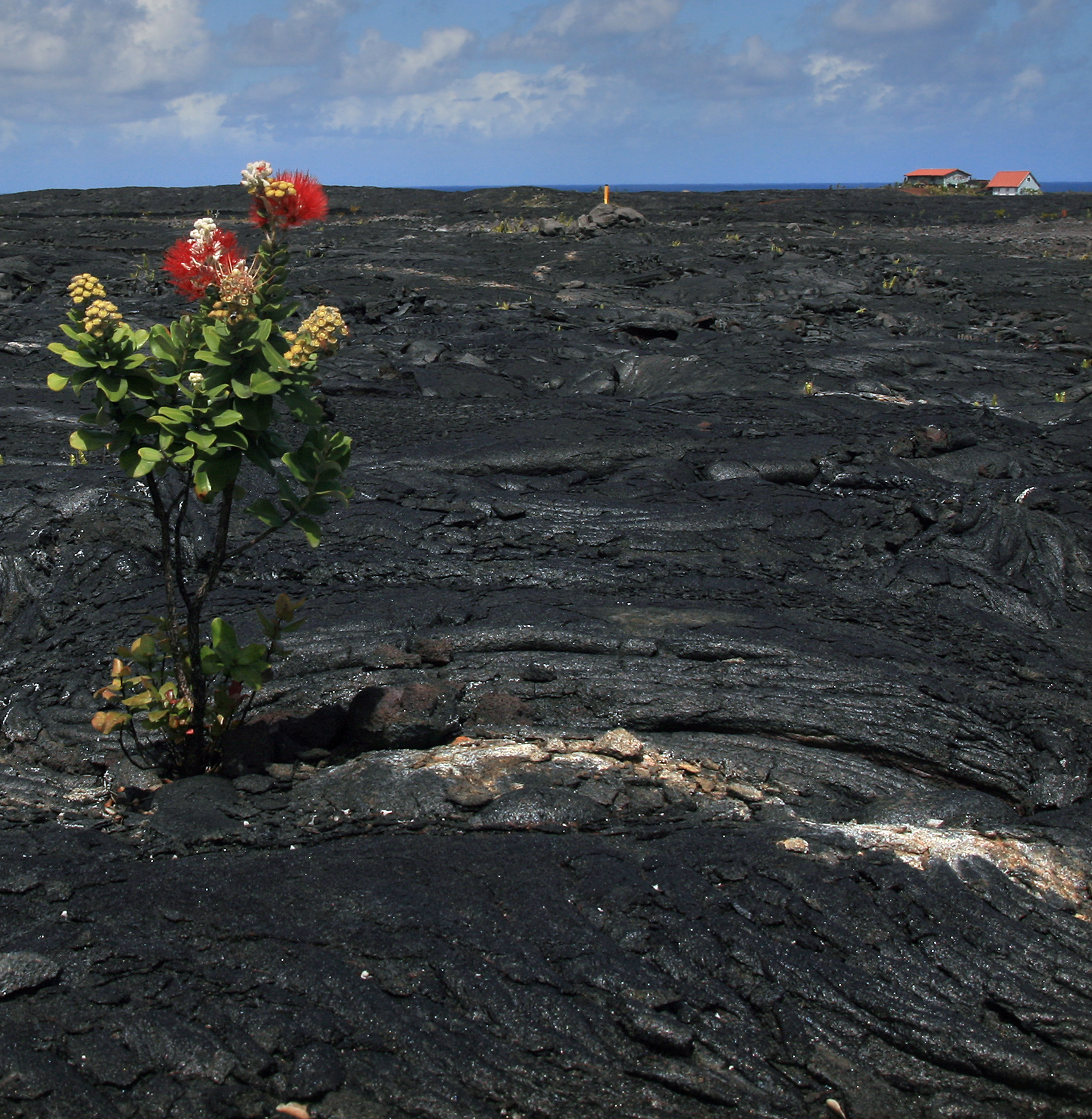
ʻŌhiʻa (Metrosideros polymorpha) growing on a barren lava field dating from 1986, formerly the village of Kalapana, Hawaii. The myrtle in this picture, taken in 2009, may have since been covered over—fresh flows in 2010 partially re-covered the area.

Because of its position more than 3,000 km (1,864 mi) from the nearest continental landmass, the island of Hawaiʻi is one of the most geographically isolated landmasses; this strongly influenced its ecology. The majority of the species present on the island are endemic, the result of its isolated lineage sheltered; its ecosystem is vulnerable to invasive species and to human development–an estimated one-third of the island's natural flora and fauna is extinct.

Kīlauea's ecological community is further threatened by the volcano itself; lava flows often overrun and incinerate forest sections, while ash smothers local plant life. Layers of carbonized organic material at the bottom of ash deposits are evidence of this destruction. Parts of the volcano's slopes display the dichotomy between pristine montane forest and volcanic "deserts" yet to be recolonized.

Kīlauea's bulk affects local climate through the influence of trade winds coming predominantly from the northeast, which, when squeezed upwards by the volcano's height, result in a moister windward side and an arid leeward flank. The volcano's ecology reflects its height, and by the distribution of volcanic products, making for varied soil conditions. The northern part of Kīlauea is mostly below 1,000 m (3,281 ft) and receives more than 75 in (191 cm) mean annual rainfall, and is mostly a lowland wet community; farther south, with precipitation less than 50 in (127 cm) mean annual rainfall, is considered mostly a lowland dry environment.

=== Ecosystems ===
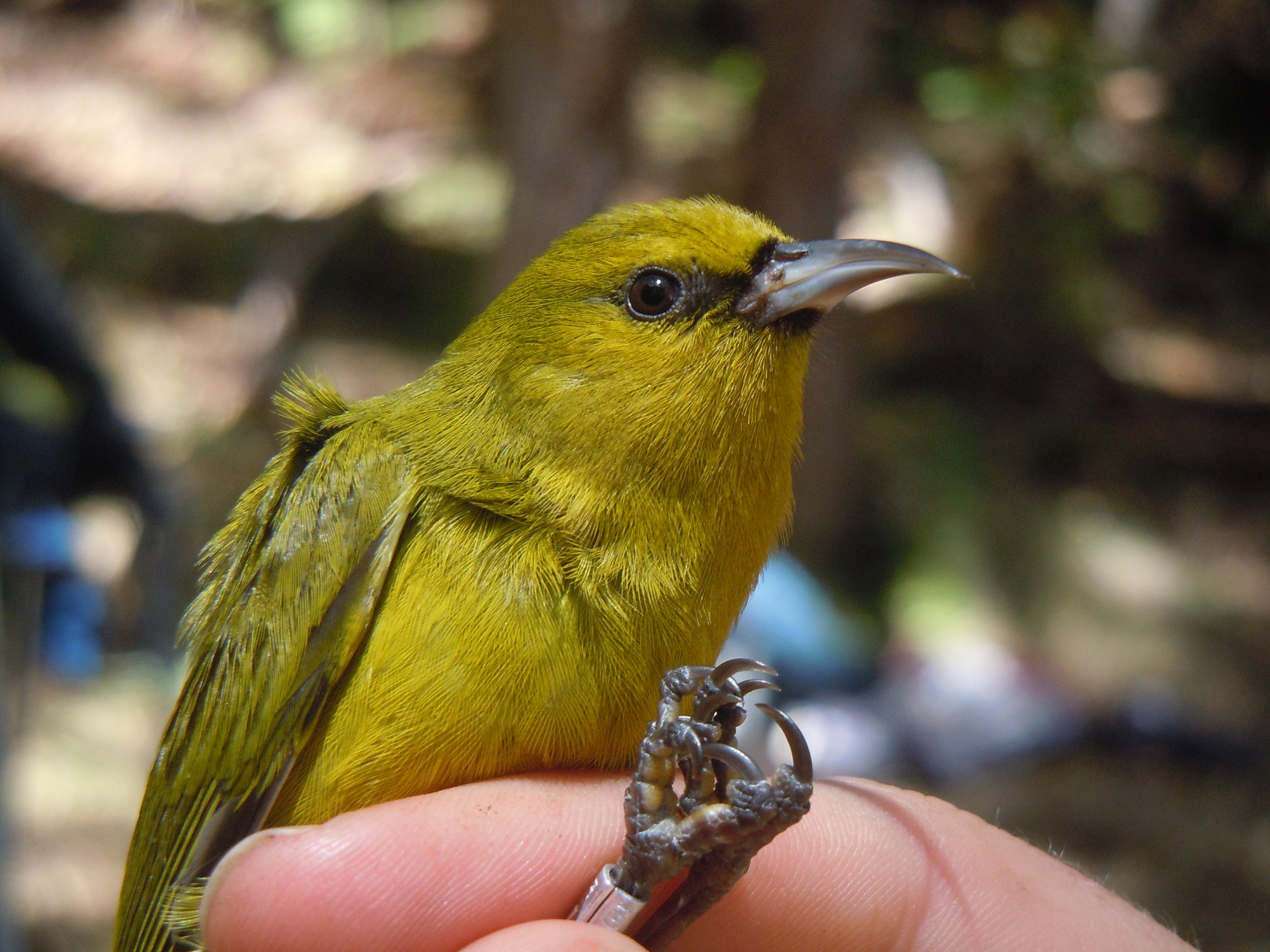
The ʻamakihi (Chlorodrepanis virens) is one of the many birds that live on the volcano's flanks.

Much of Kīlauea's southern section lies within the national park. It offers aʻe ferns, ʻōhiʻa trees (Metrosideros polymorpha), and hapu’u of genus Cibotium are common. The park hosts many bird species, including the ʻapapane (Himatione sanguinea); ʻamakihi (Hemignathus virens); iʻiwi (Vestiaria coccinea); ‘ōma’o (Myadestes obscurus), ʻelepaio (Chasiempis sp.); and the endangered ʻakepa (Loxops coccineus), ʻakiapolaʻau (Hemignathus munroi), nēnē (Branta sandvicensis), ʻuaʻu (Pterodroma sandwichensis), and ʻio (Buteo solitarius) species. The coast hosts three of the island's nine known critically endangered hawksbill sea turtle (Eretmochelys imbricata) nesting sites.

Some of the area alongside the southwestern rift zone takes the form of the Kaʻū Desert. Although not considered a true desert (rainfall there exceeds 1,000 mm (39 in) a year), precipitation mixing with drifting volcanic sulfur dioxide forms acid rain with a pH as low as 3.4, greatly hampering plant growth. The deposited tephra particulates make the local soil very permeable. Plant life there is practically nonexistent.

Kīlauea's northern lowland wet-forest ecosystem is partially protected by the Puna Forest Reserve and the Kahauale`a Natural Area Reserve. At 27,785 acres (11,244 ha), Wao Kele o Puna is Hawaiʻi's largest lowland wet forest reserve, and is home to rare plant species including hāpuʻu ferns (Cibotium spp.), ʻieʻie vines (Freycinetia arborea), and kōpiko (Psychotria mariniana), some of which play a role in limiting invasive species' spread. ʻOpeʻapeʻa (Lasiurus cinereus semotus) ʻio (Buteo solitarius), common ʻamakihi (Hemignathus virens), and nananana makakiʻi (Theridion grallator) live in the trees. Many more as-yet-undocumented species are thought to lie within the forest. Wao Kele's primary forest tree is ʻōhiʻa lehua (Metrosideros polymorpha).

== Human history ==
=== Ancient Hawaiian ===
The first Ancient Hawaiians to arrive on Hawaii island lived along the shores, where food and water were plentiful. Flightless birds that had previously known no predators became a staple food source. Early settlements had a major impact on the local ecosystem, and caused many extinctions, particularly bird species, while introducing foreign plants and animals and increasing erosion rates. The prevailing lowland forest ecosystem was transformed from forest to grassland; some caused by their use of fire, but the main cause appears to have been the Polynesian rat (Rattus exulans).

The summits of the island's volcanoes are revered as sacred mountains. In one Hawaiian mythology, sky father Wākea marries earth mother Papa, giving birth to the islands. Kīlauea itself means "spewing" or "much spreading" in Hawaiian, and Kīlauea is the body of the deity Pele, goddess of fire, lightning, wind, and volcanoes. The conflict between Pele and the rain god Kamapuaʻa was centered there; Halemaʻumaʻu, "House of the ʻamaʻumaʻu fern", derives its name from the struggle between the two gods. Kamapuaʻa, hard-pressed by Pele's ability to make lava spout from the ground at will, covered the feature, a favorite residence of the goddess, with fern fronds. Choked by trapped smoke, Pele emerged. Realizing that each could threaten the other with destruction, the other gods called a draw and divided the island between them, with Kamapuaʻa getting the moist windward northeastern side, and Pele directing the drier Kona (or leeward) side. The rusty singed appearance of the young fronds of the ʻamaʻumaʻu are said to be a product of the legendary struggle.

=== Modern era ===
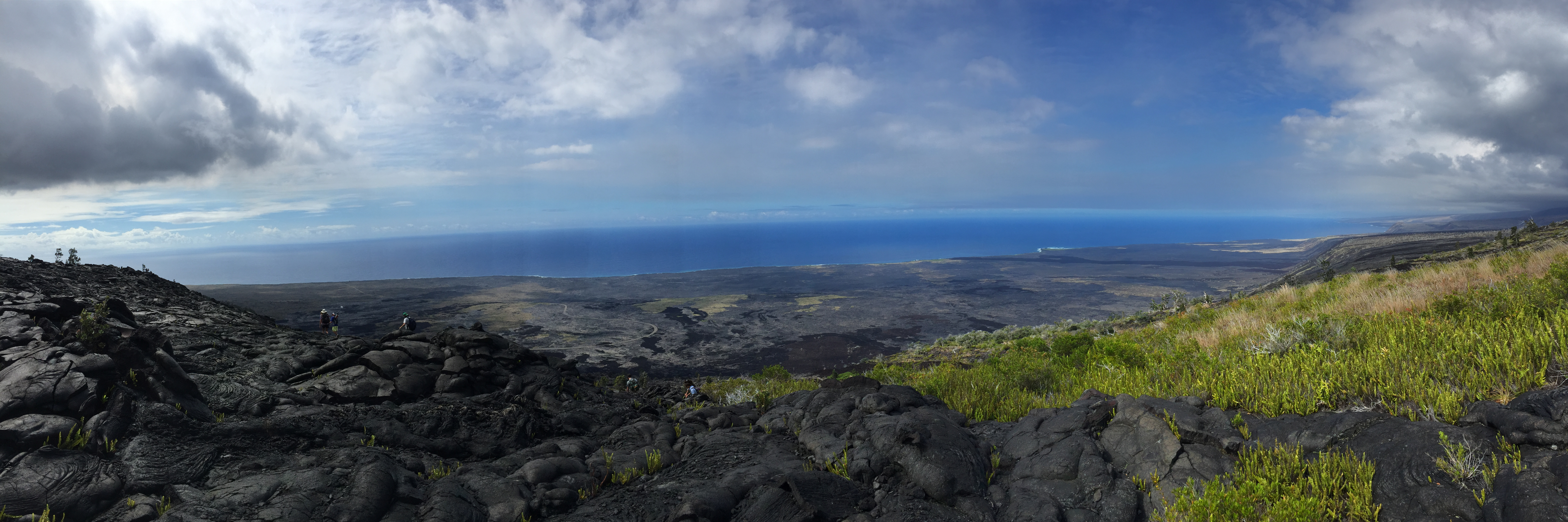
Students collecting GPS data for the USGS in Kīlauea's eastern rift zone in 2015

The first foreigner to arrive at Hawaii was James Cook in 1778. The first non-native to observe Kīlauea in detail was William Ellis, an English missionary who in 1823 spent more than two weeks trekking across the volcano. He collated the first written account of the volcano and observed many of its features.

Another missionary, C. S. Stewart, U.S.N., wrote of it in his journal A Residence in the Sandwich Island, which Letitia Elizabeth Landon quoted from in the notes to her poetical illustration to an engraving of a painting by William Ellis after F Howard, The Volcano of Ki-Rau-E-A in Fisher's Drawing Room Scrap Book, 1832.

One of the earliest and most important surveyors of Kīlauea was James Dwight Dana, who studied and wrote about the island's volcanoes for decades first-hand. Dana visited Kīlauea's summit in 1840. After publishing a summary paper in 1852, he directed a detailed geological study of the island in 1880 and 1881. He did not consider Kīlauea a separate volcano, instead referring to it as a flank vent of Mauna Loa; geologist C. E. Dutton elaborated on Dana's research during an 1884 expedition. His work led Kīlauea to be accepted as a separate entity.

=== Hawaiian Volcano Observatory ===
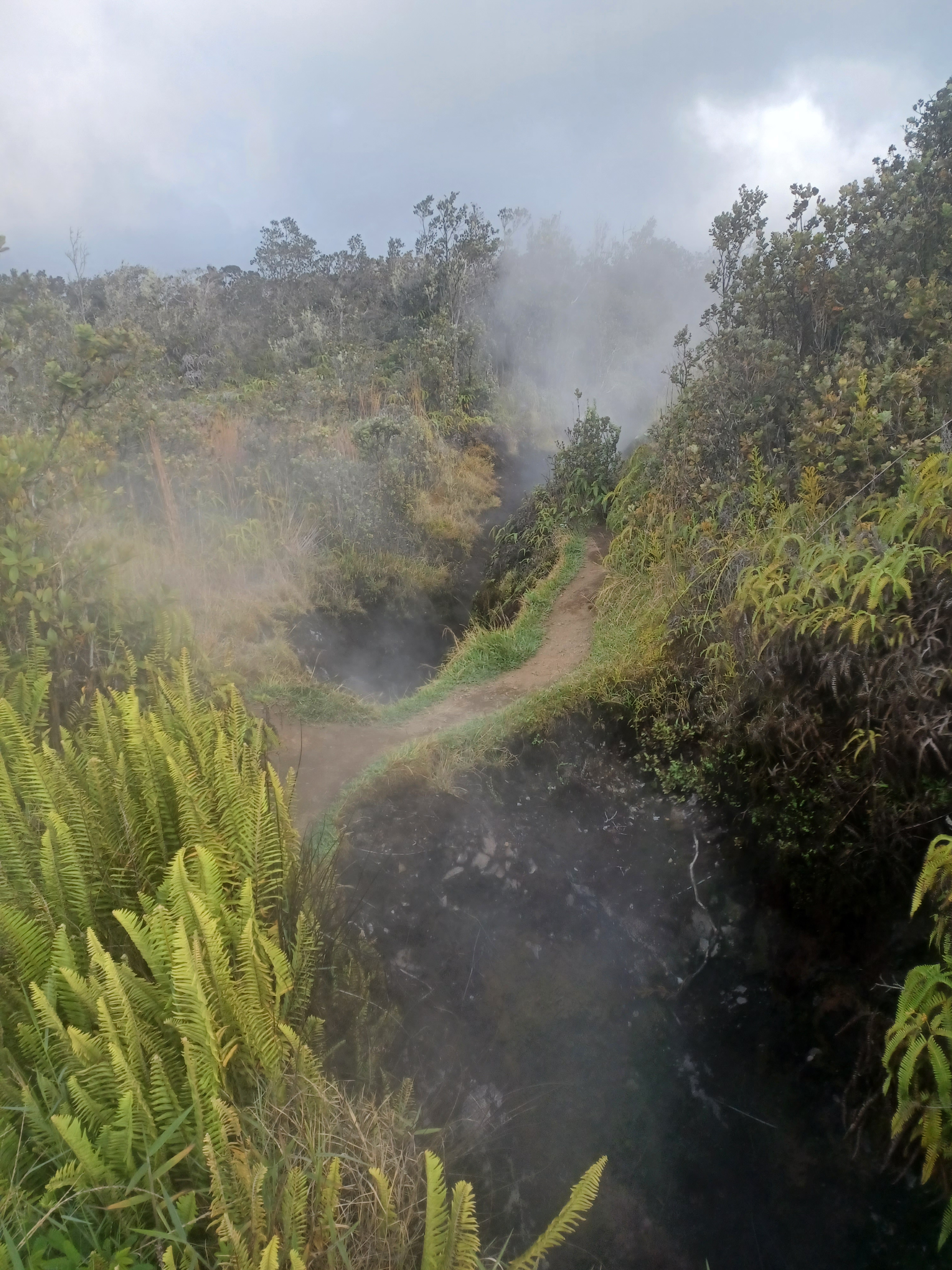
Steam venting from fissures inside Kaluapele, October 2022

The next era of Kīlauea's history began with the establishment of the Hawaiian Volcano Observatory in 1912. The first permanent such installation in the United States, the observatory was the brainchild of Thomas Jaggar, head of geology at the Massachusetts Institute of Technology. After witnessing the devastation of the 1908 Messina earthquake near Mount Etna in Italy, he declared that systematic volcanic and seismic study was required, and chose Kīlauea as the initial site.

After securing funding from MIT and the University of Hawaiʻi, Jaggar served as director of the observatory between 1912 and 1940. He pioneered seismological and observational study and observation of the volcano. After initial funding ran out, the Observatory was funded by the National Weather Service, USGS, and the National Park Service in turn. USGS reclaimed the observatory and funded it after 1946. The main building was moved twice since establishment, and the facility on the northwest rim of Kaluapele served until 2018 when it was damaged beyond repair by volcanic activity, and the buildings were torn down in 2024.

NASA used the area to train Apollo Astronauts in recognizing volcanic features, planning traverses, collecting samples and taking photographs. Training took place in April 1969, April 1970, December 1970, December 1971, and June 1972. Astronauts of Apollo 12, Apollo 14, Apollo 15, Apollo 16 and Apollo 17 used this training on the Moon. Notable geologist instructors included William R. Muehlberger.

== Research ==
In October 2019, January 2020, and December 2020, USGFS volcanologists used a drone to study gases inside the water lake at the summit, as it was too dangerous for humans to approach. After the lake boiled away, they used the drone to study the resulting gas plumes.

In 2022, researchers reported that Kīlauea's seismic waves could be used to predict future outbreaks. These waves can last for tens of seconds. After the 2007 eruption ended, they analyzed thousands of events from seismic sensors, GPS stations, and lake height observations, including variables such as temperature and gas bubble density. They reported that magma temperature was associated with seismic signal duration and bubble quantity and composition.

== Tourism ==
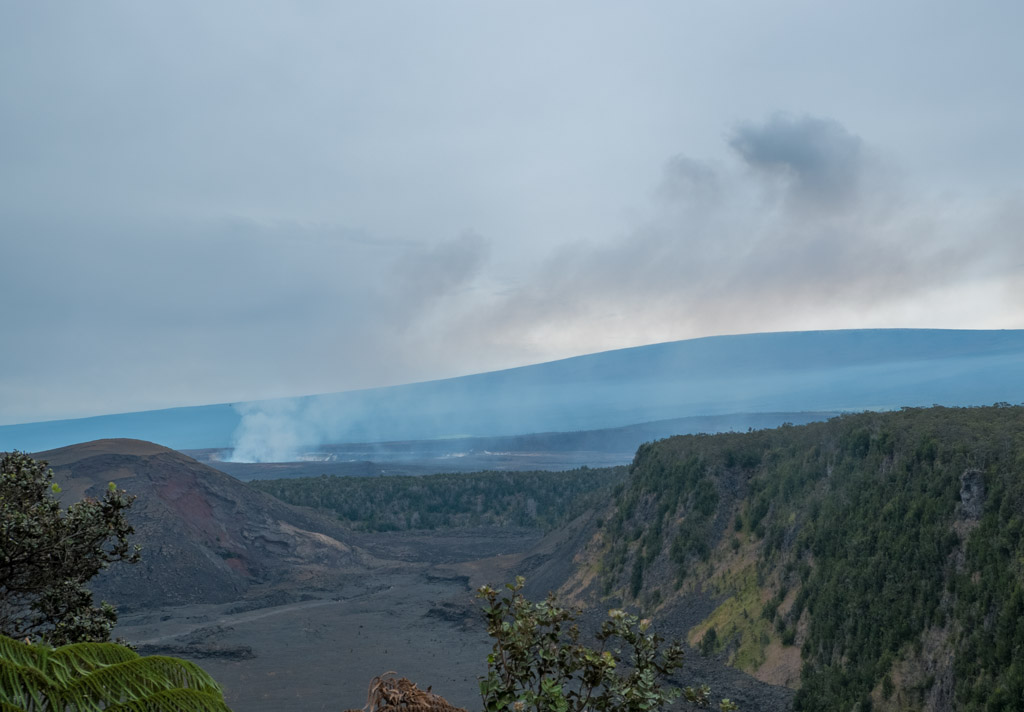
View from the edge of Kilauea Iki: across Kaluapele, Halemaʻumaʻu is emitting fume on the left side of Kaluapele, while Mauna Loa towers above in the background (March 2013)

Kīlauea became a tourist attraction in the 1840s, and businessmen such as Benjamin Pitman and George Lycurgus operated a series of hotels at the rim, including Volcano House, which is the only hotel or restaurant located within Hawaiʻi Volcanoes National Park.

In 1891, Lorrin A. Thurston, investor in hotels along the volcano's rim, began campaigning for a park, boosting an idea proposed by William Richards Castle, Jr. in 1903. Thurston, who owned the Honolulu Advertiser newspaper, printed editorials in favor of the idea; by 1911 Governor Walter F. Frear had proposed a draft bill to create "Kilauea National Park". Following endorsements from John Muir, Henry Cabot Lodge, and former President Theodore Roosevelt (in opposition to local ranchers) and several legislative attempts introduced by delegate Jonah Kūhiō Kalanianaʻole, House Resolution 9525 was signed into law by Woodrow Wilson on August 1, 1916. It was the country's 11th National Park, and the first in a Territory.

Originally called "Hawaii National Park", it was split from Haleakala National Park on September 22, 1960. Today, the park, renamed the Hawaiʻi Volcanoes National Park, is a major conservatory agency and tourist attraction, and, since 1987, a World Heritage Site.

Hawaii tourism grew slowly before exploding with the advent of jet airliner travel around 1959. Kīlauea, as one of the few chronically erupting volcanoes, was a major part of the island's tourist draw. According to the National Park Service, Kīlauea is visited by roughly 2.6 million people annually.

The Thomas A. Jaggar Museum was a popular tourist stop. Located at the edge of Kaluapele, the museum's observation deck offered the best sheltered view on the volcano of the activity at Halemaʻumaʻu; however, the museum was closed permanently after the building sustained structural damage from earthquakes associated with the 2018 eruptions.

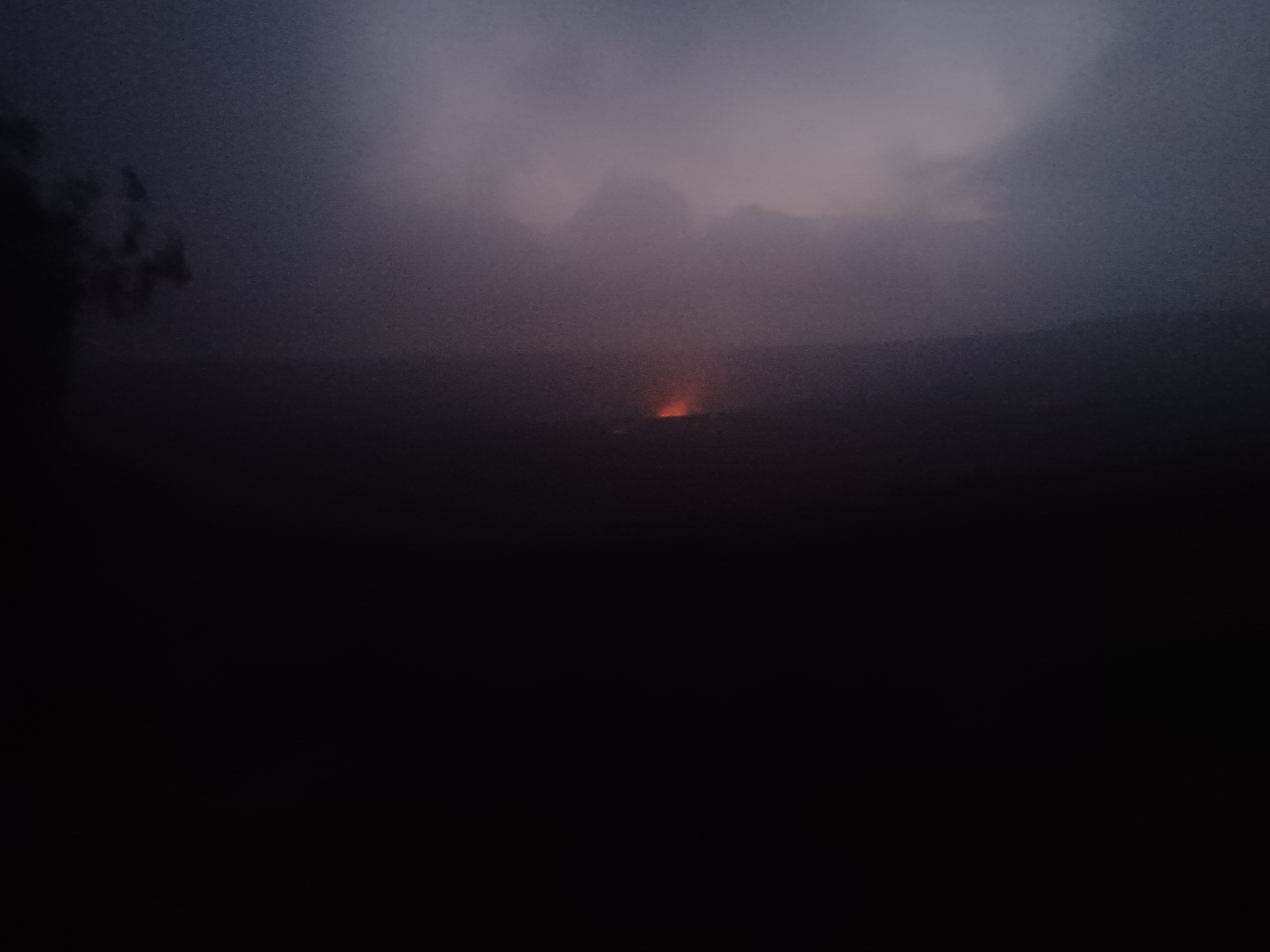
Glowing lava at sunset, seen from near Volcano House, October 2022

Volcano House provides lodging within the park, while additional housing options are available in the Volcano Village.

Visitors associated with the military can find lodging at the Kilauea Military Camp. The park provides hiking trails, points of interest, and guided ranger programs. The Crater Rim Trail around the volcano is designated as a National Recreation Trail.

== See also ==
- List of volcanoes in the United States
- Fagradalsfjall
- Krafla
- Masaya Volcano
- Mount Etna
- Erta Ale
- Mount Yasur
- Mount Nyiragongo
