= ʻAilāʻau eruption =

Prehistoric eruption of Kīlauea volcano on Hawaiʻi, Hawaiian Islands

- Volcano: Kīlauea
- Start date: 1410 (?)
- End date: 1470 (?)
- Type: Hawaiian
- Location: Hawaiʻi, United States
- VEI: 0

The ʻAilāʻau eruption is a prehistoric eruption of Kīlauea volcano on the island of Hawaiʻi in the Hawaiian Islands. Carbon 14 dated from approximately 1410 to 1470 with an eruptive volume of 5.2 ± 0.8 km^{3} and fed by lava tubes near Kīlauea Iki crater, it was among the last of a series of highly voluminous lava flows since about 1290 that blanketed vast swaths of what is now Hawaii County's Puna District. The Kazumura Cave lava tubes were also created by this eruption. The ʻAilāʻau eruption occurred before written records, but was witnessed by Ancient Hawaiians, and through their oral traditions it is thought to have inspired the Hawaiian myth of ʻAilāʻau, whose name in the Hawaiian language means "forest-eater" in reference to the many forest lands consumed by lava.
