= Keanakakoi eruption =

1790 volcanic eruption

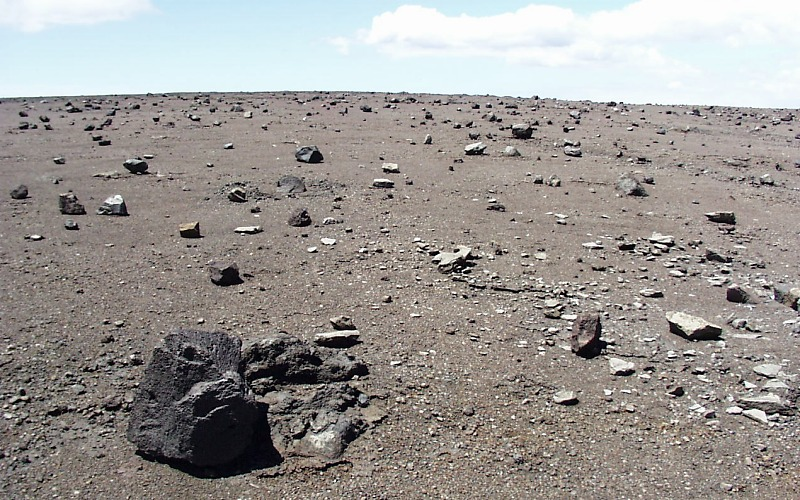
- Ash layer in the Kaʻū Desert from the Keanakakoi eruption. The overlying rocks are from an eruption at Kīlauea in 1924.
- Volcano: Kīlauea
- Date: November 1790 A.D., around the 17th or 18th
- Type: Phreatomagmatic, Strombolian, Phreatic
- Location: Hawaii, Hawaiian Islands; 19°24′46″N 155°16′32″W
- VEI: 4
- Impact: More than 400 deaths

The Keanakakoi eruption was a VEI-4 eruption that occurred from the summit caldera of Kīlauea volcano in or around November 1790. It has been described as the deadliest volcanic eruption in what is now the United States, with more than 400 people having been killed in the event. The eruption deposited the Keanakakoi Ash which surrounds the Kīlauea Caldera.

Three eruptive phases define the Keanakakoi eruption, all of which were separated by quiescent spells. The first phase of the eruption was phreatomagmatic, and involved the deposition of fine-grained, well-bedded volcanic ash. A Strombolian-style scoria fall deposit and phreatomagmatic ash similar to that of the first phase were deposited during the second phase. The third and final phase was phreatic and produced interbedded pyroclastic fallout and surge deposits.

== See also ==
- 1790 Footprints
