= 1790 Footprints =

East Hawaiʻi Battles of 1790
- Part of Unification of Hawaii
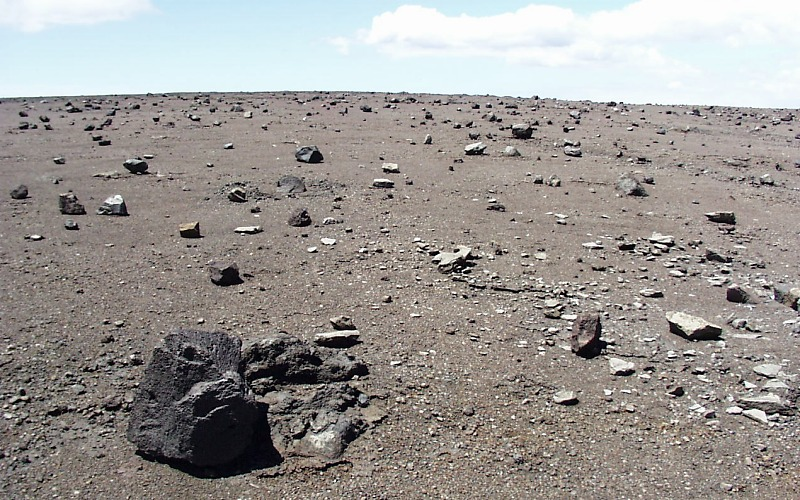
- Ash layer from 1790 eruption.
Date	1790
Location	Eastern Hawaiʻi Island
Result	inconclusive

Belligerents
Kamehameha I's army	Keōua Kuahuʻula

Commanders and leaders
Kamehameha I Keawemauhili	Keōua Kuahuʻula

- 1790 Footprints
- U.S. National Register of Historic Places
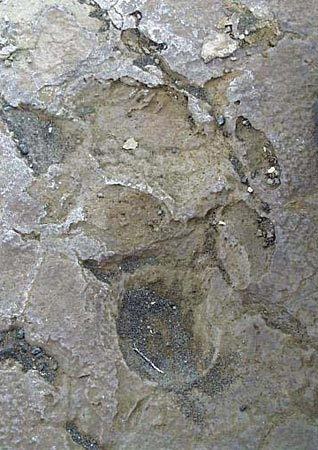

- Location within Hawaii
- Location: 9.1 mi. SW of park headquarters on Hwy. 11, then foot trail to SE for 1 mi., Hawaii Volcanoes National Park, Hawaii
- Coordinates: 19°20′49″N 155°21′12″W
- Area: 4,284 acres (17.34 km^{2})
- Built: 1790
- NRHP reference No.: 74000351
- Added to NRHP: August 7, 1974

The 1790 Footprints are a set of footprints found near the Kīlauea volcano in present-day Hawaii Volcanoes National Park on the island of Hawaiʻi. Resulting from an unusually explosive eruption, they may be associated with a series of battles in the area in 1790.

== Background ==
The 1782 Battle of Mokuʻōhai gave Kamehameha I control of the west and north sides of the island of Hawaiʻi, but Keōua Kuahuʻula and his uncle Keawemauhili were able to escape.

For a few years, while Kamehameha was occupied with Maui and the arrival of Europeans to Kona, Keōua ruled Kaʻū and Keawemauhili ruled Hilo.

By 1790, Keawemauhili and Kamehameha had made peace. Keawemauhili aided Kamehameha's invasion of Maui that same year. This cooperation broke an agreement between Keawemauhili and Keōua. Keōua, angered, raided some of the lands of Kamehameha while he was in Maui at the Battle of Kepaniwai.

Keōua then attacked and killed his uncle at Hilo. Kamehameha returned from Maui to the Big Island, and Keōua ambushed them in a thick forest of Paʻauhau, but the battle was inconclusive. Kamehameha counterattacked and drove Keōua back, in what is known as the Battle of Koapapaʻa. Kamehameha had brought a cannon salvaged from the ship Fair American captured at Kaʻūpūlehu. Keōua captured the piece, but did not have gunpowder nor expertise to use it effectively. After heavy losses on both sides, the commanders each decided to retreat to their secure territory.

The footprints were thought to have been left by Keōua's forces in their retreat. While passing Kīlauea, they made offerings to the goddess Pele and made camp. As the volcano started to erupt, they thought they might have made some offense, so he split his group into three and stayed to make more offerings.

Two parties of warriors were overwhelmed by a pyroclastic eruption while crossing the desert. Only one party of three survived the eruption. The footprints were attributed by early geologist Thomas Jaggar to those warriors who were killed in this event. Keōua would be killed later in 1791 at Kawaihae.

The Ancient Hawaiians kept elaborate oral histories, but did not accurately count years from the Christian era. One important event in the oral history was Ke one helelei which means "the falling sand" in the Hawaiian language. This corresponded to an eruption witnessed in 1790 by British sailor John Young. It was probably given the specific name because it was an unusual kind of eruption for Hawaiian volcanoes. Surveyor Frederick S. Lyman used the 1790 date to estimate people's birthdates during his 1857 tax assessment.

== Recognition ==
The footprints were found accidentally by geologist Ruy H. Finch in the hardened ash of the Kaʻū Desert while he was trying to investigate a 1919 eruption that produced Mauna Iki (small mountain). Although the National Park had been formed by then, these lands were owned by the Territory of Hawaii. In 1938 the area was proposed as a bombing practice range, resulting in protest from conservation groups. On June 20, 1938, the Federal Government bought the land to add to the park, with the bombing range limited to four and a half square miles. The Army never used the land, but the Navy caused some injuries to fishermen in 1945. In June 1950 the bombing range was returned to the park after being cleared of unexploded ordinances.

In 1941 the Civilian Conservation Corps built a trail and shelter. It is designated as Hawaiʻi state archaeological site number 10-61-5505 and was listed in the National Register of Historic Places on August 7, 1974, as site number 74000351.

The area can be accessed via a trail starting 9.1 miles (14.6 km) southwest of the park headquarters on the Hawaii Belt Road, State Highway 11.
