= Kaʻū Desert =

Desert in Hawaii

The Kaʻū Desert is a leeward desert in the district of Kaʻū, the southernmost district on the Big Island of Hawaii, and is made up mostly of dried lava remnants, volcanic ash, sand and gravel. The desert covers an area of the Kīlauea Volcano along the Southwest rift zone. The area lacks any vegetation, mainly due to acid rainfall.

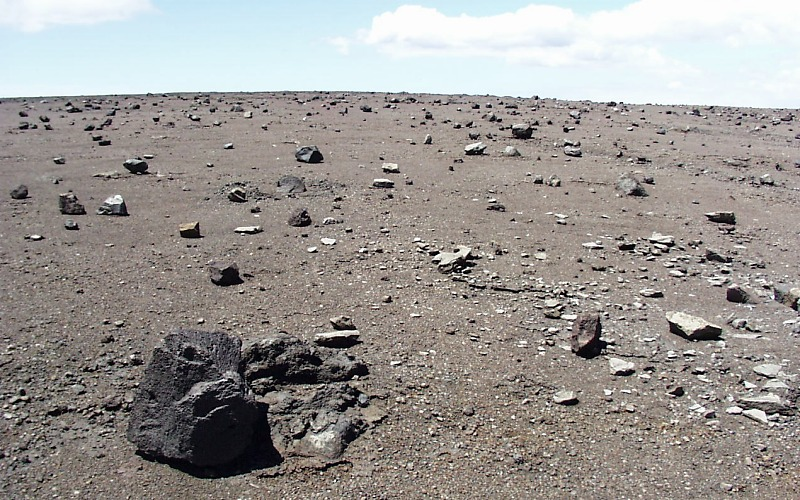
Photograph by S.R. Brantley of USGS showing rocks from 1924 eruption on 1790 ash layer

== Climate ==
Kaʻū desert is not a true desert in that rainfall exceeds 1,000 millimeters (39 in) per year. However, rain combines with sulfur dioxide, released by volcanic vents, and forms acid rain. The pH level of the rain, as low as 3.4 during an eruption, inhibits plant growth. Furthermore, water evaporates quickly on the ground and the tephra soil is extremely permeable.

== Visiting ==
The Kaʻū Desert is popular for walking and hiking tours during inactive periods. It can be reached by following Highway 11 counterclockwise from Kona to the volcano. The trailhead is on Crater Rim Drive, coordinates 19°24′31″N 155°17′48″W. By traversing the desert, one can cross the Great Crack and the Southwest Rift Zone, a major fault zone that looks like a giant groove in the earth, before reaching Kīlauea Volcano. The area is part of Hawaii Volcanoes National Park, but often is closed during periods of high volcanic activity, due to the potential for poisonous gas blown southwest by the tradewinds from Halemaʻumaʻu.

== The 1790 eruption ==
Footprints preserved in the ash

One of the most devastating explosions in Hawaiian history occurred in 1790. The eruption released volcanic ash, which formed spheres of tephra known as accretionary lapilli due to the effect of electrostatic forces and moisture. Chief Keōua Kuahuʻula was traveling then around Kīlauea to Kaʻū, after battling the dominant chief Kamehameha I. At least 80 Hawaiian warriors suffocated when volcanic ash entered their lungs. The footprints preserved in the ash were supposedly of these warriors. However, recent research indicates a variety of people used this area for hundreds of years.
