= Pit crater =

Depression formed by collapse of the surface into a void

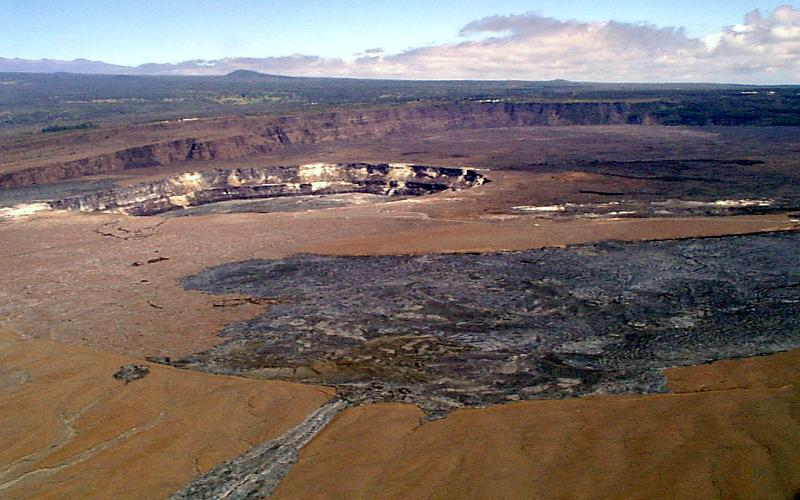
Kilauea with Halemaʻumaʻu

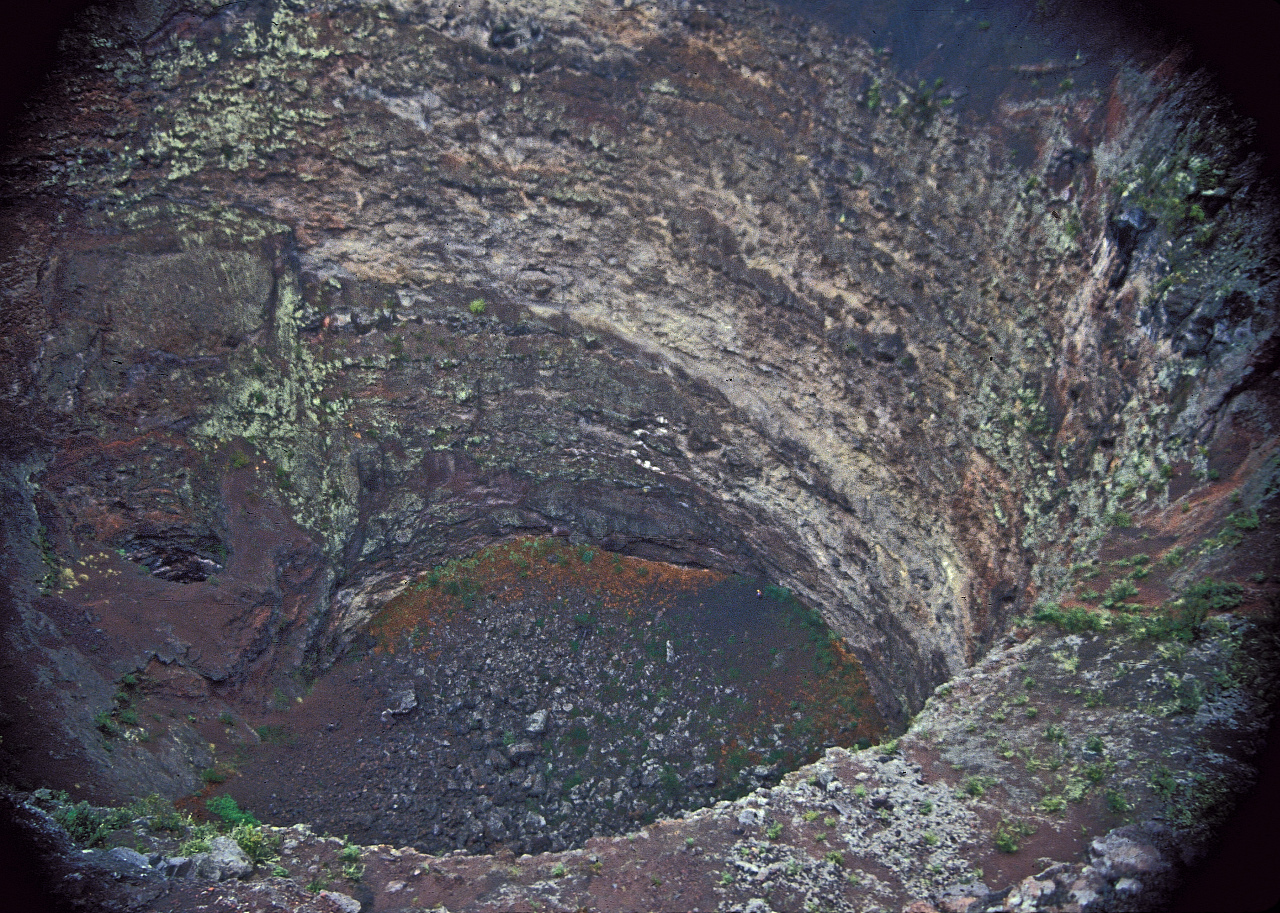
Deep pit crater on Hualalai Hawaii

A pit crater (also called a collapse crater) is a depression formed by the sinking or collapse of the surface lying above a void or empty chamber, rather than by the eruption of a volcano or lava vent. Pit craters are found on Mercury, Venus, Earth, Mars, and the Moon. Pit craters are often found in a series of aligned or offset chains; in these cases, the features is called a pit-crater chain. Pit-crater chains are distinguished from catenae or crater chains by their origin. When adjoining walls between pits in a pit-crater chain collapse, they become troughs. In these cases, the craters may merge into a linear alignment and are commonly found along extensional structures such as fractures, fissures, and graben. Pit craters usually lack an elevated rim as well as the ejecta deposits and lava flows that are associated with impact craters. Pit craters are characterized by vertical walls that are often full of fissures and vents. They usually have nearly circular openings.

As distinct from impact craters, pit craters are not formed from the clashing of bodies or projectiles from space. Rather, they can be formed by a lava explosion from a bottled-up volcano (the explosion leaving a shallow caldera) or when the ceiling over a void is not solid enough to prevent the collapse of the overlying material. Pit craters can also result from the collapse of lava tubes or dikes, or from collapsed magma chambers under loose material.

A newly formed pit crater has steep, overhanging sides and is shaped inside like an inverted cone, growing wider closer to the bottom. Over time, the overhangs fall into the pit, and the crater fills with talus from the collapsing sides and roof. A middle-aged pit crater is cylindrical, but its rim will continue to collapse, resulting in the crater expanding outward until it resembles a funnel or drain—narrower at the bottom than the top.

While pit craters and calderas form through similar processes, the former term is usually reserved for smaller features of a mile or less in diameter. The term pit crater was coined by C. Wilkes in 1845 to describe craters along Hawaii's East Rift Zone.

Hawaii is known for its volcanoes and pit craters. In 1868, an eyewitness saw more than two-thirds of the basin of Kilauea cave in and fill with a lava lake. This process happened repeatedly. The modern Halema'uma'u Shield began growing and then collapsed into a deep, funnel-shaped pit. This pit filled with lava and for 19 years burned continuously, becoming famous as the Hawaiian Fire Pit. In 1924 the lava lake emptied when the walls of the crater cracked and collapsed and filled with water that turned to steam. After a week and a half, Halema'uma'u had widened and was 1,700 feet (520 m) deep. Rocks that were blasted away from the crater can still be seen on the caldera floor.

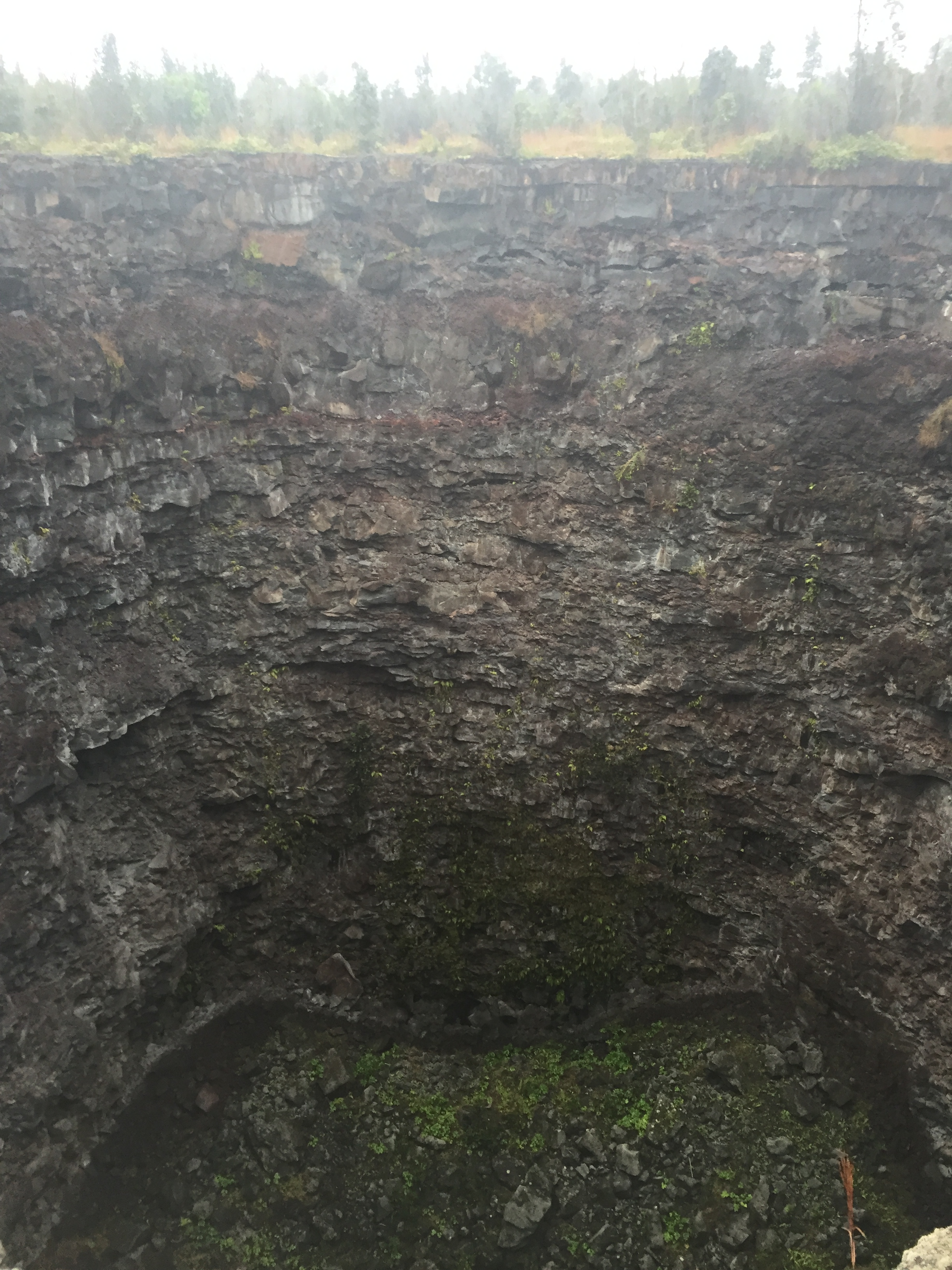
Western rim of Devil's Throat pit crater in June 2016

Devil's Throat (pictured at right) is another good Hawaiian example of a pit crater, especially since its formation through collapse was observed over time. It was first documented by Thomas Jaggar, who estimated its dimensions as 15m × 10.5m × 75m. In 1923, William Sinclair was lowered into Devil's Throat on a rope. He found a cavern shaped like an upside down funnel which widened as he approached the bottom. He measured the floor as about 60 meters in diameter, and the crater's depth around 78 meters. The crater's mouth widened over time, and in 2006, the crater's dimensions were measured as 50m × 42m × 49m. This growth is explained by observing pieces of the overhanging roof breaking off and falling to the bottom. These shards gradually piled up on the crater floor, reducing its depth.

The process also happens on the surface of Mars and other terrestrial planets. Features resembling pit craters have been observed on Mercury.
