= Kamoamoa =

Volcanic fissures on Kīlauea, Hawaii, US

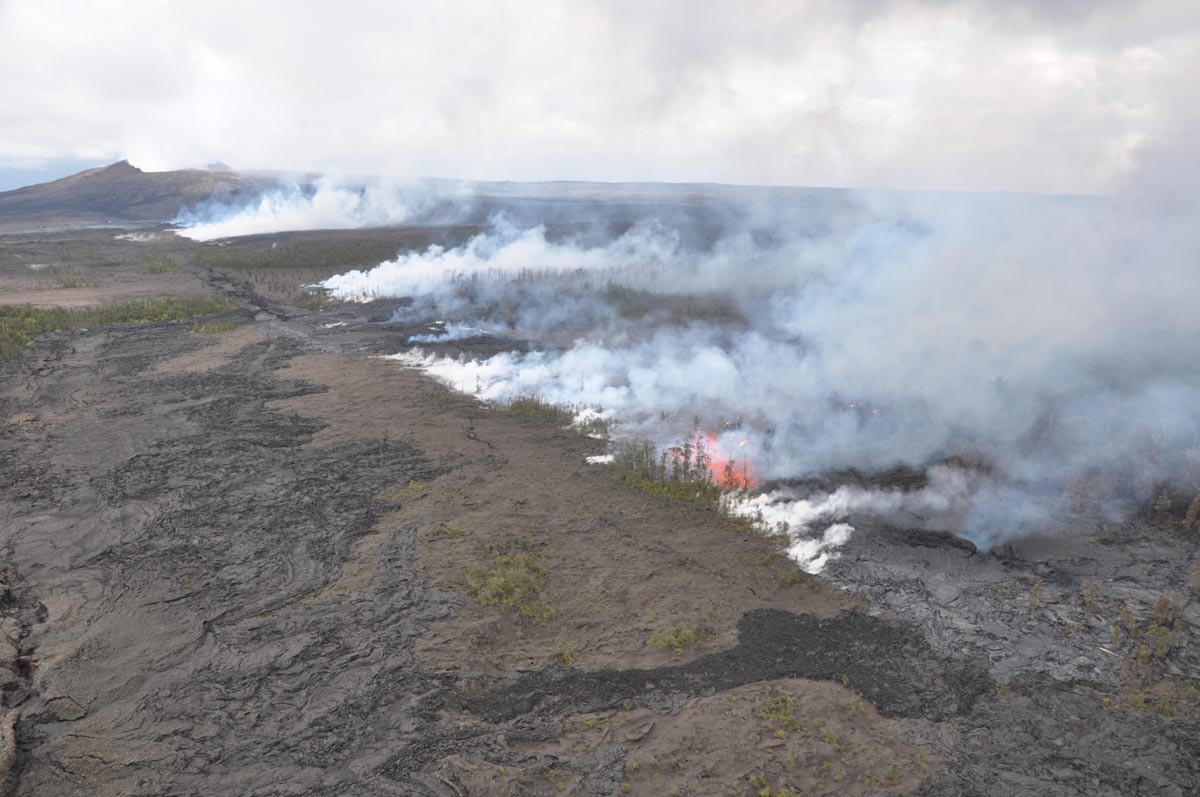
- Aerial view of Kamoamoa erupting with the Puʻu ʻŌʻō in the background on March 7, 2011.

Highest point
- Elevation: ≈ 750
- Coordinates: 19.3801°N 155.1257°W

Geography
- Location: United States/Hawaii

Geology
- Rock age: 12 years
- Rock type: Basalt
- Volcanic belt: Kīlauea (island of Hawaii)
- Last eruption: March 5 to 10, 2011

Kamoamoa is a set of volcanic fissures born on March 5, 2011, on the flanks of Kīlauea, Hawaii, US. Their opening between Puʻu ʻŌʻō to the east and Nāpau to the west follows a sudden drop in the level of lava lakes in the Puʻu ʻŌʻō and Halemaʻumaʻu craters, as well as an increase in nearby seismic activity, particularly tremors. Lava erupted for five days, forming a flow that advanced by around two kilometers. Following the eruption, a fire broke out in the forest.

== Toponymy ==
The toponym of the volcanic fissure is the same as that of the area to the east of the Nāpau crater where it opened. As Kamoamoa does not appear as a single volcanic cone, it is not preceded by the Hawaiian term Puʻu, meaning "hill", unlike Puʻu Kamoamoa, an ancient cone located just northeast of the fissure but covered by Puʻu ʻŌʻō since its formation in 1983.

== Geography ==
Kamoamoa is located in the United States, in the southeastern part of the Hawaiian archipelago and island. Administratively, it is in the Puna District, part of Hawaii County, in the State of Hawaii. It lies entirely within Hawaii Volcanoes National Park.

Kamoamoa takes the form of small volcanic cones aligned along a set of fissures 2.3 kilometers long stretching southeast from the Kīlauea Caldera, between two craters, Nāpau to the south-southwest and Puʻu ʻŌʻō to the north-northeast. From these fissures a lava flow emanated a 2.9 kilometers long and four meters thick in a southeasterly direction.

== History ==
=== Beginnings of the eruption ===
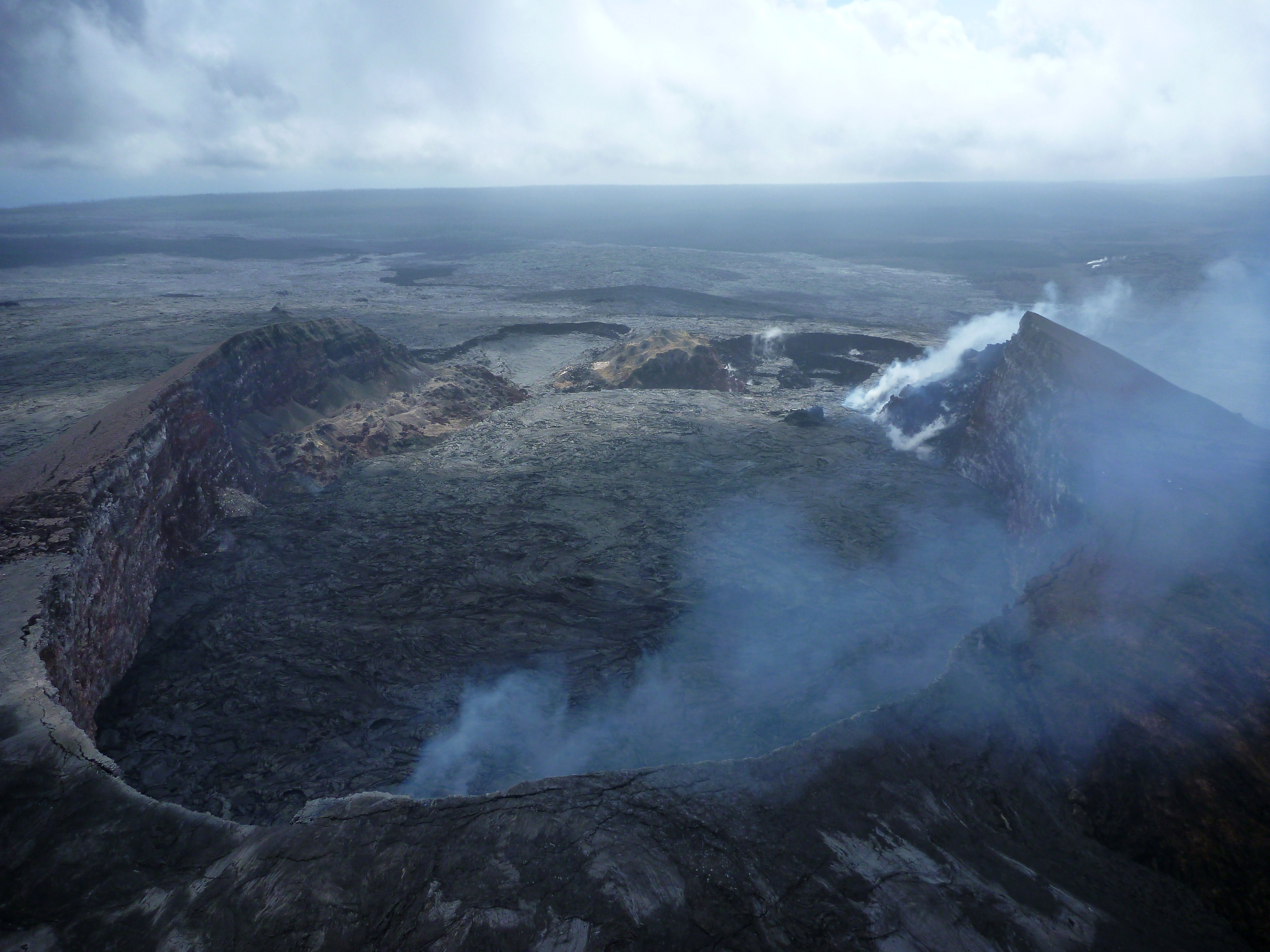
Aerial view of Puʻu ʻŌʻō a few days before its crater floor collapsed; the location of the Kamoamoa fissure opening is on the right of the image.

The opening of the Kamoamoa fissures is preceded by a change in the eruptive style of Kīlauea. From March 1 to 4, 2011, earthquakes were detected at the eastern rift near the summit caldera. They were followed the next day by a tremor and deflation of the volcano by more than 150 microradians at Puʻu ʻŌʻō from 1:42 p.m. local time, then another deflation appeared under the caldera from 2:00 pm. In the two craters of Halemaʻumaʻu located in the caldera and Puʻu ʻŌʻō on the east rift, the level of the lava lakes decreased rapidly and by several tens of meters. That of Puʻu ʻŌʻō thus loses at least 115 meters between 14:16 and 14:21 and continues its movement at 16:26, while that of Halemaʻumaʻu decreased by around 200 meters between March 5 and 7. This rapid drop in lake levels leads to instability in the crater walls. Those to the northeast and east of Puʻu ʻŌʻō collapsed inside the crater on March 5 at 2:45 pm, producing a plume of ash, and rockfalls were observed in the Halemaʻumaʻu crater, also causing the emission of a volcanic plume on March 7 and 8.

=== Birth and formation ===
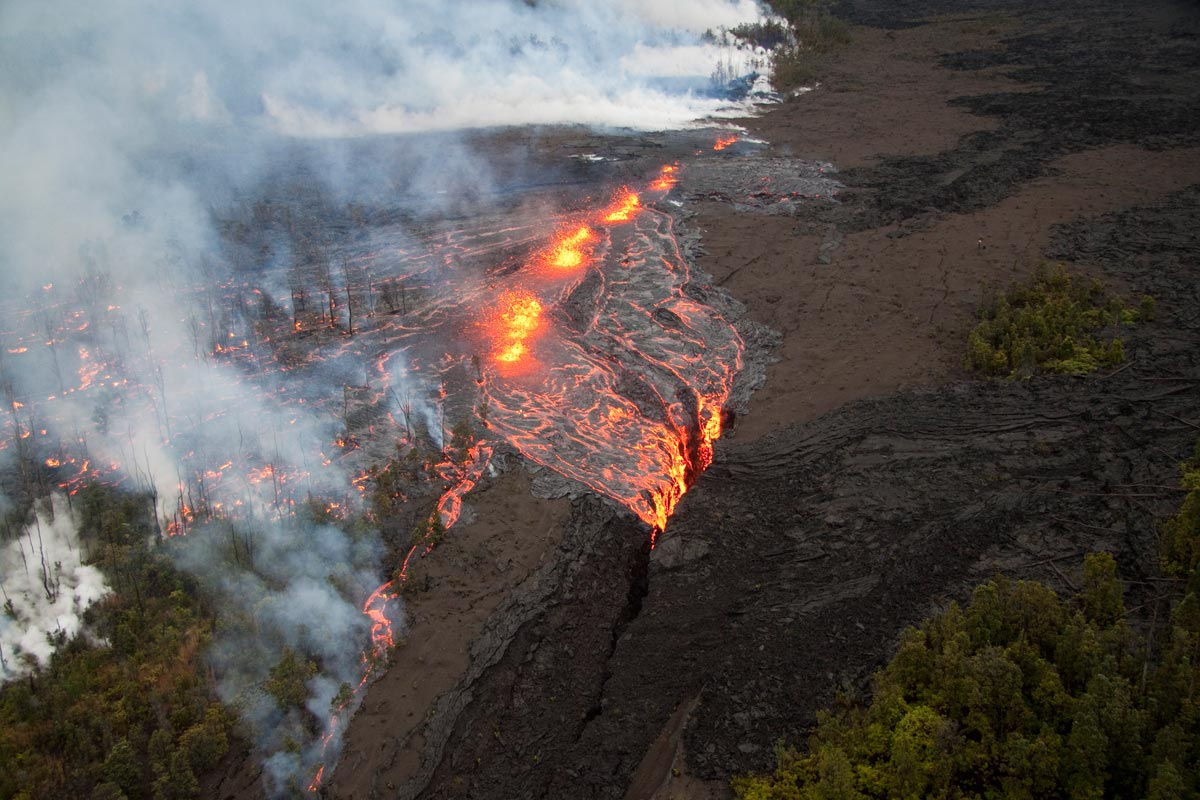
Aerial view of Kamoamoa erupting on March 6, 2011: in the foreground, lava is rushing into an ancient fissure.

At the same time as the level of the lava lakes began to drop, a new seismic swarm was detected beneath the Makaopuhi and Nāpau craters, and a set of volcanic fissures, the Kamoamoa, opened up at 5:15 pm. over a length of 2.3 kilometers south-southwest of the Puʻu ʻŌʻō, between it and the Nāpau. These fissures immediately released lava at a rate of 2.5 × 106 m3 per day, forming small cones 25 meters high and lava flows that destroyed the surrounding vegetation. These lava flows covered short distances, as they were immediately captured by a series of parallel fissures into which they rushed. Between 9:55 p.m. and the following morning, Kamoamoa stopped emitting lava and its volcanic cones reached a height of forty metres. On March 6, the first fissures began spewing lava again, and new ones opened up, releasing more volcanic gases than lava. On that day, sulphur dioxide emissions reached 10,000 tonnes per day, surpassing the previous record of 7,000 tonnes per day set in July 2008. Among the first fissures, those at the western end are the most active, with the formation of volcanic cones exceeding thirty meters in height. Fountains of lava spout from these cones, giving rise to numerous small flows, which eventually join to form a single flow heading south-east. The lava flows along the Pacific coast, on the other hand, lost flow on the 6th and dried up completely the following day.

On March 8, Kamoamoa was still active, and its fissures continued to spit out lava that fed the ʻaʻā-type flow. The latter is advancing through the forest, burning vegetation. On March 9, the eastern fissures dry up, but still spew volcanic gases in the form of a plume, while the flow emitted from the western fissures has covered 2.9 kilometers after thirty hours of eruption. By March 10, lava was no longer being emitted from Kamoamoa, but volcanic plumes were emerging from the fissures, and the tremor had returned to pre-eruption levels.

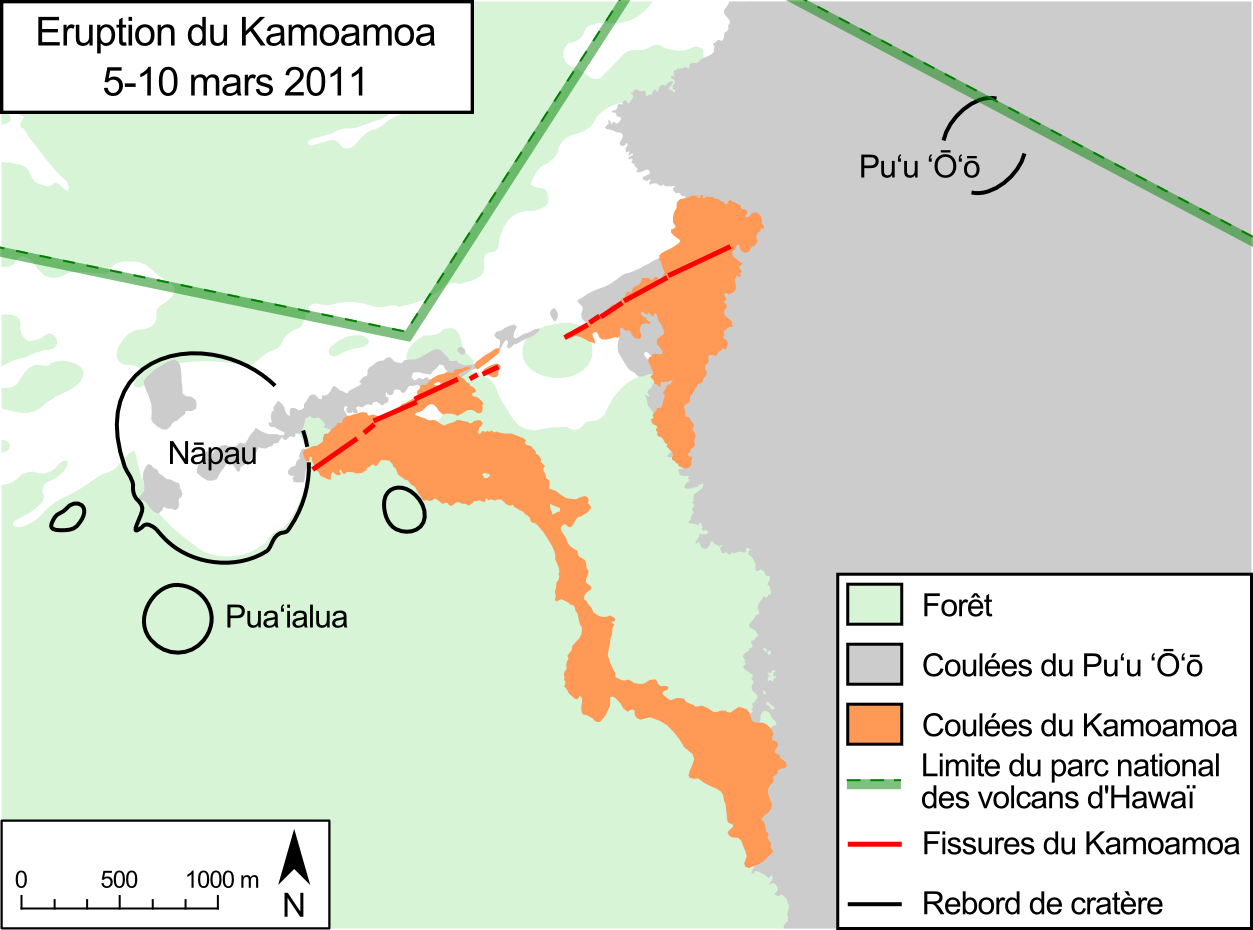
Map of Kamoamoa fissures (red lines) and flows (orange).

=== Consequences ===
As soon as the eruption began, the area was closed to hikers, the Chain of Craters Road was closed to traffic and emergency services were mobilized. These restrictions and resources remained in force despite the end of the eruption, due to a brush fire triggered and maintained by the heat of the lava. This fire advanced through the Ohia forest, already destroyed twice by fire during previous eruptions, and consumed over 740 hectares of vegetation on March 19 and 840 on March 25. As the fire advanced, Hawaiian firefighters were assisted by personnel from California's Whiskeytown-Shasta-Trinity National Recreation Area and Hawaii Volcanoes National Park. They managed to keep the fire under control on March 27, thanks in particular to the rain that had fallen in recent days.
