= Devastation Trail =

Trail in Hawaiʻi Volcanoes National Park

Coordinates: 19.4064602°N 155.2550908°W

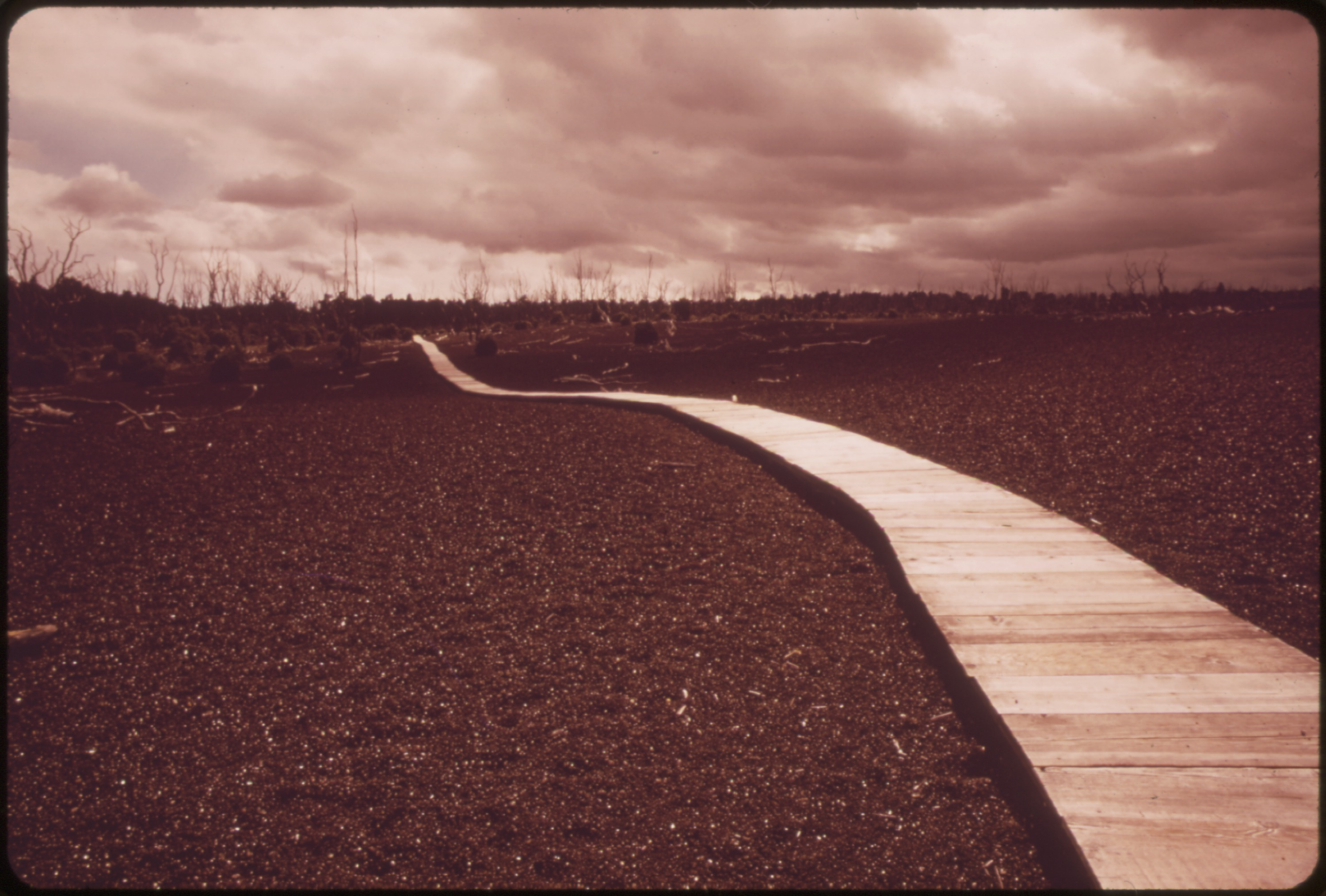
Devastation Trail, 1973

Devastation Trail is a trail in Hawaiʻi Volcanoes National Park. The paved trail allows visitors to explore the site of 1959 eruption of Kīlauea Iki crater.

== 1959 eruption of Kīlauea Iki ==
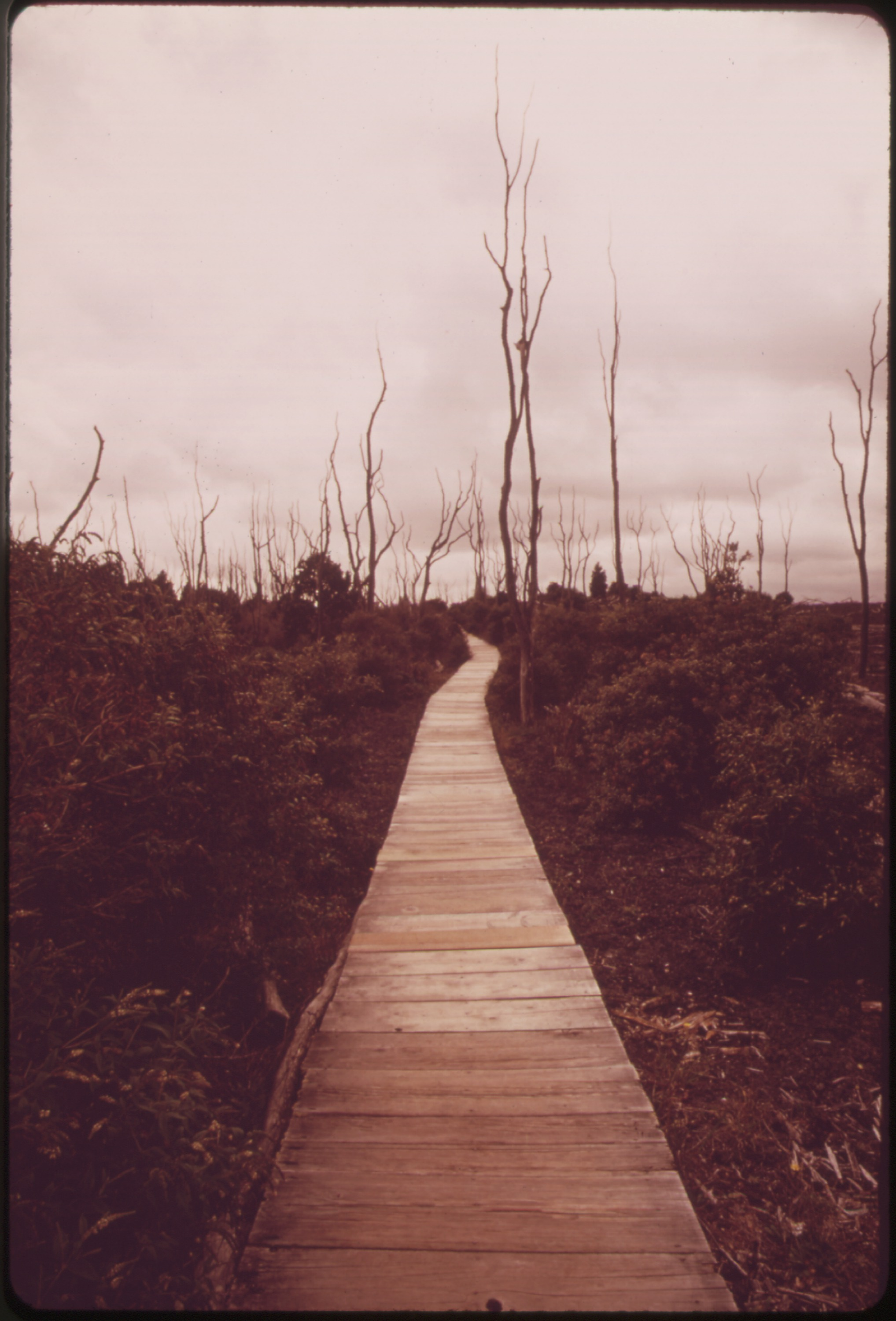
Devastation Trail in 1973

Before the 1959 eruption of Kīlauea Iki, the area that is now designated Devastation Trail was covered by a dense rain forest.

Three months before the November 14 – December 20, 1959 eruption, the area was shaken by multiple earthquakes. At first the earthquakes were deep, originating about 55 km below the volcano, but later they became shallow. On November 14 there were 10 times as many earthquakes as the day before, and the intensity of the earthquakes also increased.

By nightfall, the earthquakes stopped, and the eruption began. The fissure eruption produced fountains of lava which cascaded to the floor of the crater some 100 m below the erupting fissure. Forest fires were also noted.

Over the next few days, the lava fountains became higher and higher, eventually reaching a height of more than 500 meters. Erupting scoria started building a new cinder cone that was later named " Puʻu Puaʻi", (gushing hill). A lava lake also developed on the crater floor.

The eruption produced both Pele's hair, the geological term for threads or fibers of volcanic glass, formed when small particles of molten material are thrown into the air and spun out by the wind into long hair-like strands, and Pele's tears, produced when airborne particles of lava cool and harden in the shape of teardrops of volcanic glass. When the eruption ended on December 20, 1959 the area was devastated.

Sixteen explosive episodes were recorded during the eruption.

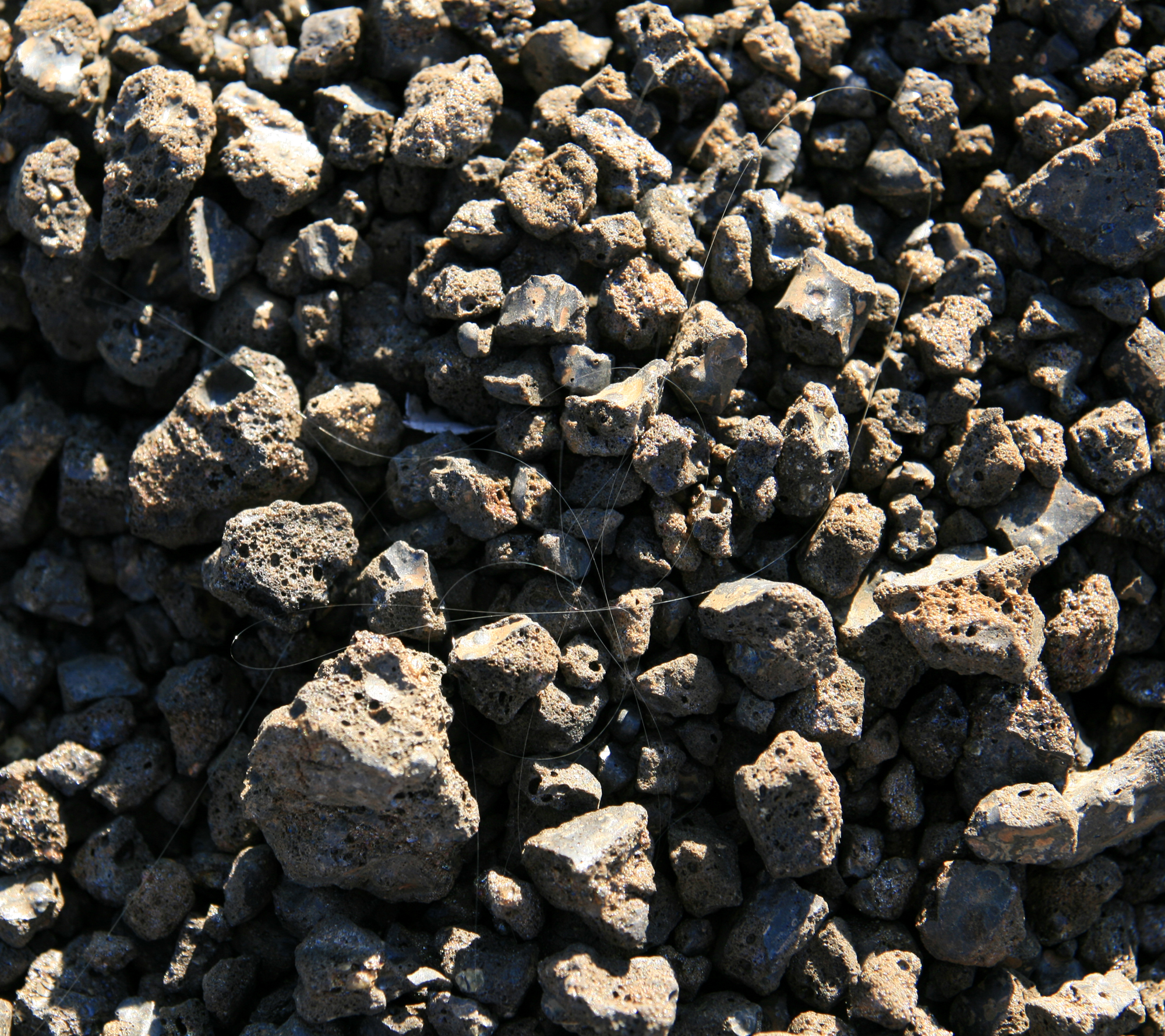
Pele's hair at Devastation Trail are well preserved after 1959 eruption of Kīlauea Iki

Devastation Trail is located off Chain of Craters Road in Hawaiʻi Volcanoes National Park on the island of Hawaiʻi (also called the Big Island). There is a parking lot, and the trail is wheelchair and stroller accessible.This trail is an easy half-mile walk each way. Ranger-led walks are offered free of charge on a regular basis.

Pele's hair and Pele's tears can be seen in their natural environment, well preserved among the cinders. These phenomena are named after Pele, the Hawaiian goddess of volcanoes.

Native Hawaiian birds and insects can be found along the beginning of the trail in forest that has been recovering since 1959 eruption.

The cinder cone Puʻu Puaʻi is seen from the trail. Cinder cones form from hot cinders that "weld themselves together into a spatter cone". Other cinders that fell farther from the eruption site had time to cool down and created a cinder blanket. It is prohibited to hike Puʻu Puaʻi.

During the 1959 eruption, southwest winds blew fragments of molten lava to the forest. Some trees lost their branches and got buried by molten lava fragments. Other trees were surrounded by molten, fluid lava and burnt. When the lava cooled down and solidified, all that was left of the trees were hollow cylinders known as tree molds. These are commonly created in Pāhoehoe lava flows, and can be seen along Devastation Trail.
