= Kīlauea Iki =

Volcano crater in Hawaiʻi

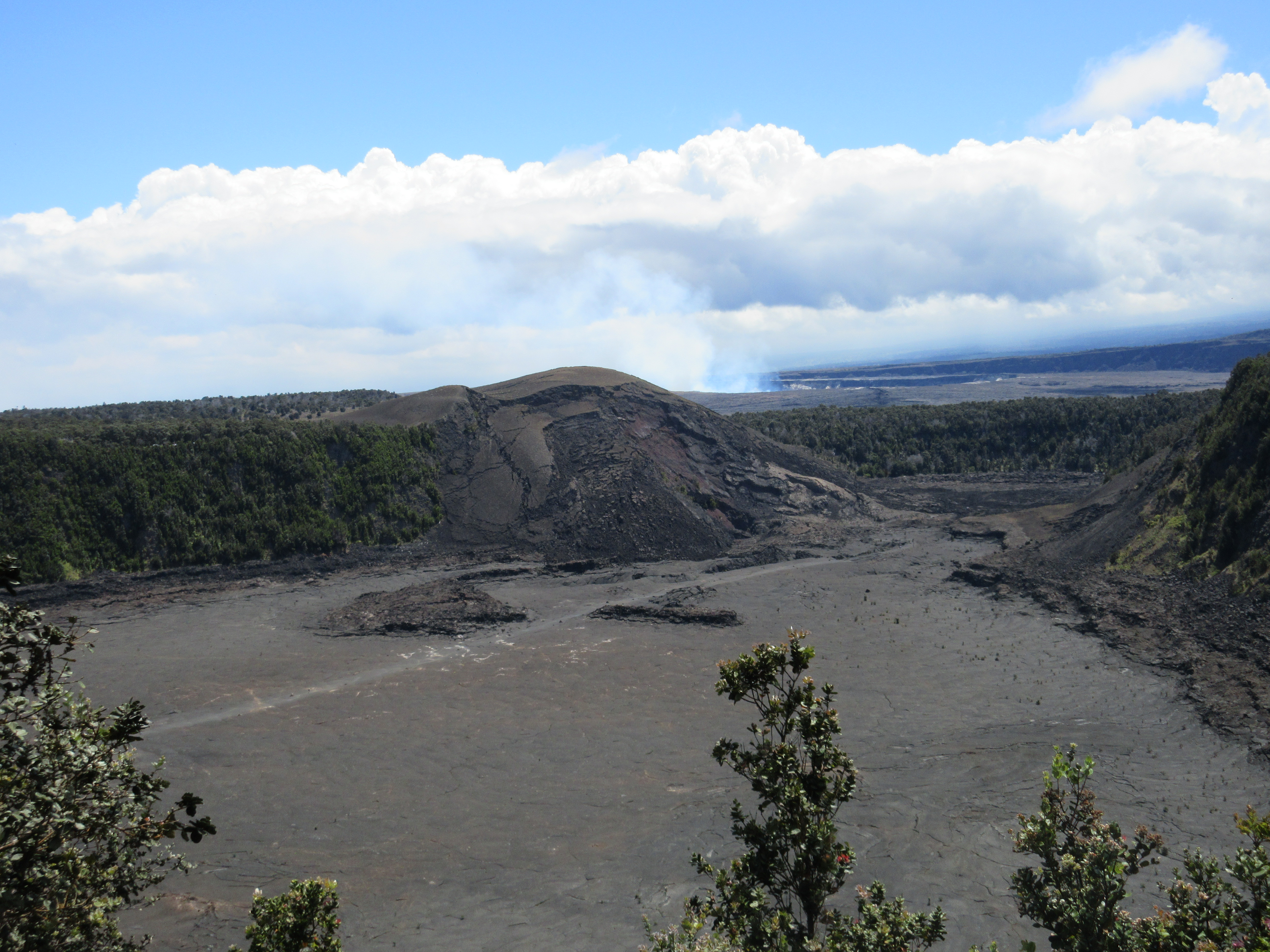
Kilauea Iki crater overlook with a view of the Pu'u Pua'i tephra cone

Kīlauea Iki ("Little Kilauea") is a volcanic crater next to the main summit caldera of Kīlauea on the island of Hawaiʻi in the Hawaiian Islands. Kīlauea Iki is a popular hiking destination within Hawaii Volcanoes National Park. Shaped like a pit, the crater existed prior to its most recent eruption, which occurred from November 14, to December 19,1959. This eruption was notable for several unique phenomena, including the formation of a large lava lake, lava rapids, waves, a lava whirlpool, and a lava fountain whose height set a record in Hawaii. Observers also recorded a two-way circulation of lava between the magma chamber and the surface.

== Geography ==
Topographic map of the Kīlauea Caldera with Kīlauea Iki to //the east.

Kīlauea Iki is located in the southeastern part of the island of Hawaii in the Hawaiian Islands archipelago. It lies at the summit of Kīlauea, immediately east of the main summit caldera. Administratively, it is part of the district of Kaʻū in Hawaii County, in the state of Hawaii.

The pit crater is 244 m (801 ft) deep. It is elongated, approximately 3 km (1.9 mi) long by 1.5 km (0.93 mi) wide, oriented east-west, with a secondary crater at its western end. The crater floor corresponds to the surface of the lava lake formed in 1959. A cinder cone, Puʻu Puaʻi, built astride the southwestern rim, rises above the steep crater walls. It reaches an elevation of 1,118 meters. However, the highest point on the rim is the northeastern edge at 1,169 meters. The Crater Rim Drive circles the main caldera and skirts the eastern side of Kīlauea Iki. A hiking trail branches off to descend into and cross the crater lengthwise.

The crater floor, though formed from a former lava lake, is not flat. As the rock cooled, it contracted, forming pressure ridges. Cooling and contraction continue at a rate of two centimeters per year. The floor is irregular and contains rock debris from collapses of the crater walls, such as those triggered by earthquakes in 1975 and 1983. Rainwater seeping into the still-hot rock heats up and emerges as steam fumaroles from numerous cracks. This steam carries dissolved minerals, primarily calcium sulfate and silica, which deposit as white concretions around the vents. Volcanic gases released during cooling altered the iron-rich volcanic rocks, giving them red or brown hues. Despite the harsh mineral and chemical environment, some plants, such as Metrosideros polymorpha (locally ʻōhiʻa), colonize cracks in the lava.

== Eruptive history ==
=== Formation ===
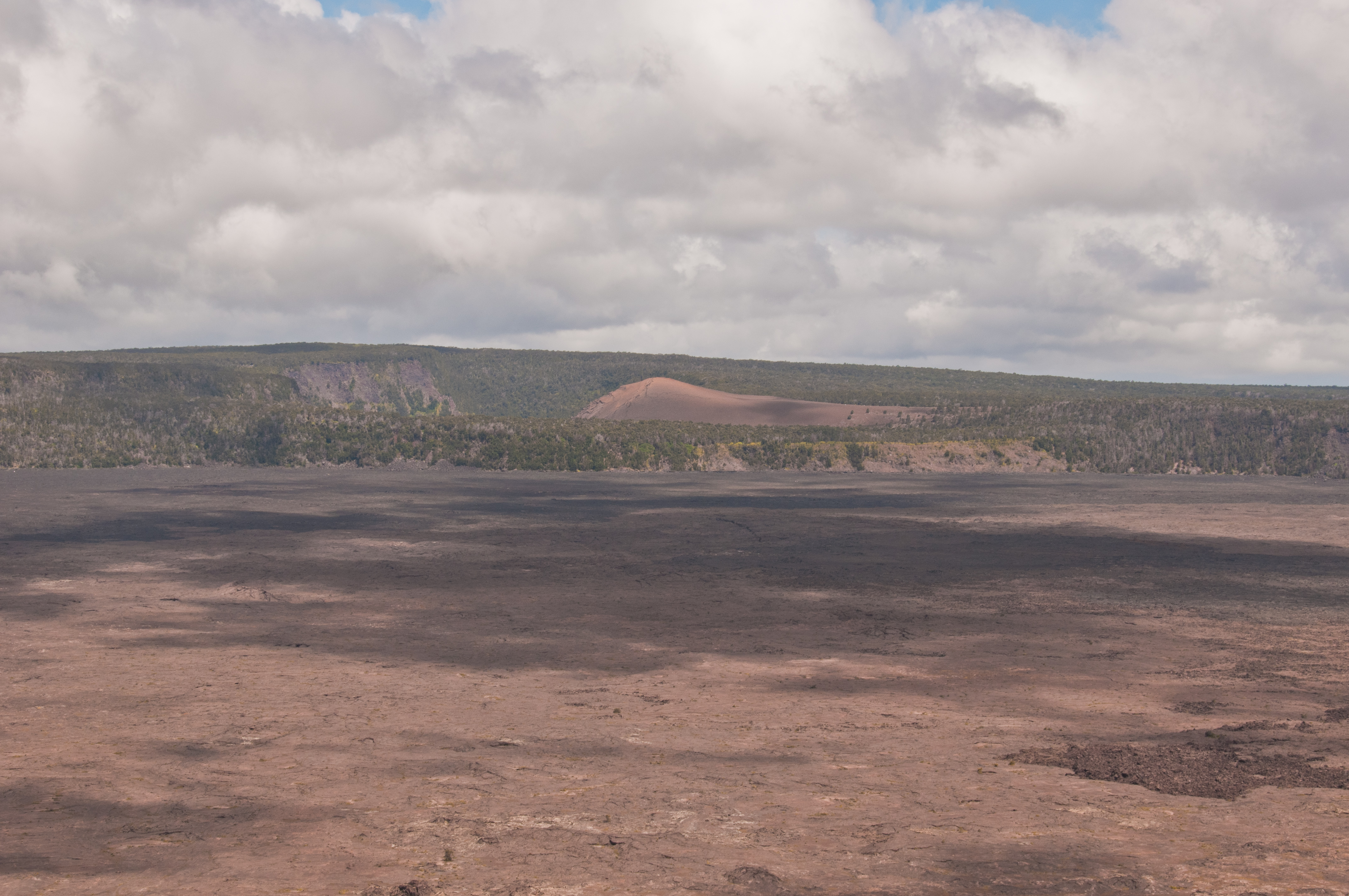
View of Kīlauea Iki and Puʻu Puaʻi from the Kīlauea Caldera with the flanks of Ailaʻau on the horizon.

Kīlauea Iki formed in the 15th century when part of the western flank of the Ailaʻau shield collapsed near its summit during an eruption that partially drained the magma chamber. Ailaʻau was a shield on Kīlauea active until the mid-17th century, located east of the current caldera, which postdates it. Its summit was capped by a crater now buried, but one vent is represented by the Twin Pit Craters immediately east of Kīlauea Iki, the southernmost of which is the entrance to the Thurston Lava Tube.

Lava tubes associated with the ʻAilāʻau eruption, carbon 14 dated from c. 1445 and erupting continuously for approximately 50 years, blanketed much of what is now Puna District with 5.2 ± 0.8 km^{3} of basalt lava.

The gently sloping flanks of this shield are still visible, particularly from the west side of the Kīlauea Caldera. After formation, Kīlauea Iki experienced no further eruptions and became fully covered by rainforest similar to that on Ailaʻau.

=== 1868 eruption ===
Kilauea Iki experienced a minor eruption in 1868, which covered the floor of the crater in a thin layer of basalt. This eruption was preceded by the great Ka'ü earthquake of 1868, a magnitude 7.9 earthquake that caused extensive damage on the island and resulted in collapses of the wall in Kilauea's summit caldera, withdrawal of lava from the summit caldera, and the brief eruption in Kilauea Iki.

=== 1959 eruption ===
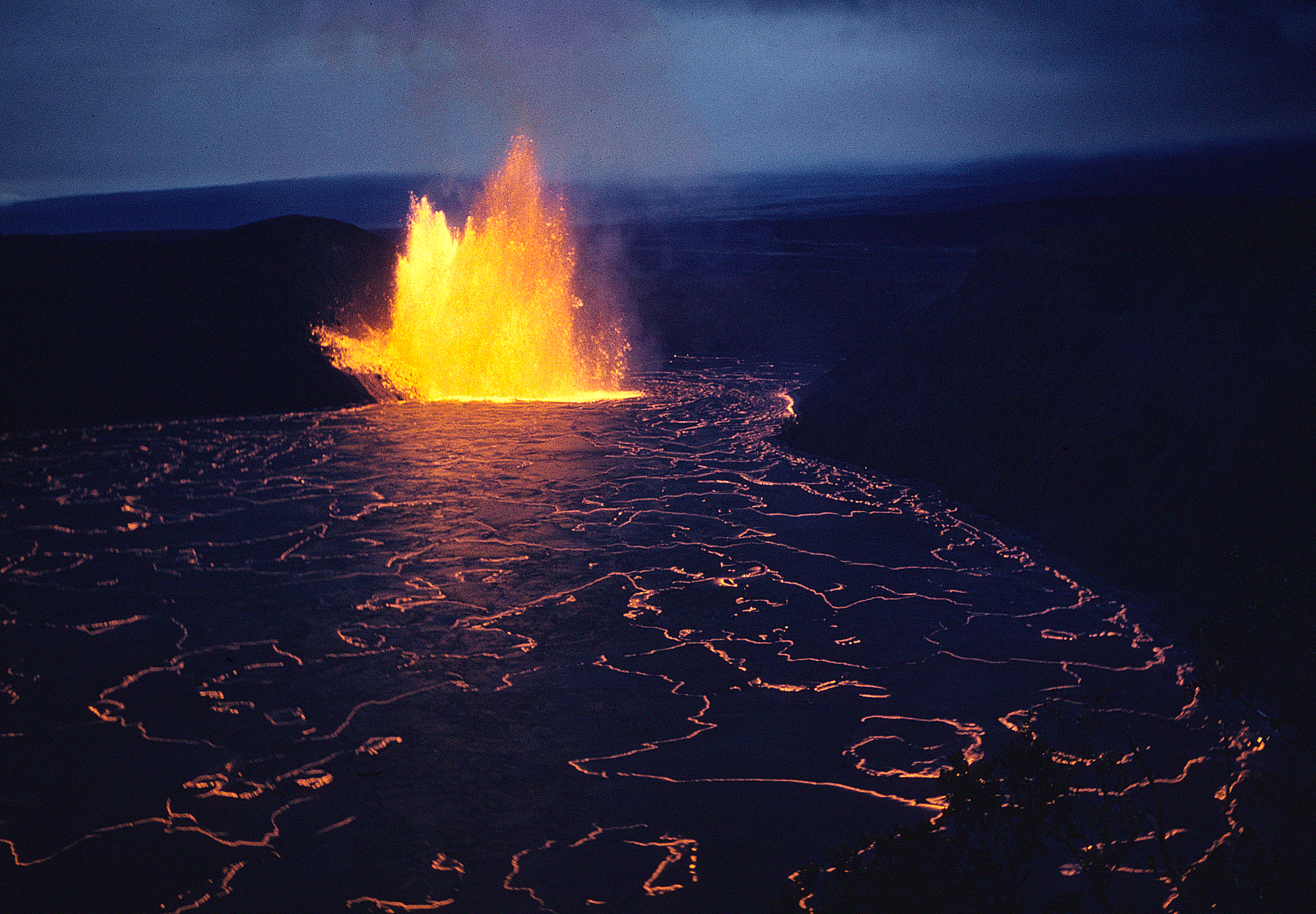
The eruption of Kīlauea Iki, near the end of the fourth eruptive episode, on December 5th, 1959

At 8:08 pm on November 14, 1959, an eruption began at the summit of Kilauea in the Kilauea Iki crater after several months of increased seismicity and deformation. Over the next month, the crater experienced 17 eruption episodes, each one (except for the last) beginning with lava fountaining and ending with lava drainback. After the first episode, which lasted 7 days, most of the remaining episodes were less than 24 hours, with the shortest (14th episode) lasting less than 2 hours. Volcanic ejecta from the main fissure on the western side of the crater formed the 70-meter (230 ft) high Pu'u Pua'i tephra cone (Hawaiian for 'gushing hill'). On December 11, 1959, at the end of the 8th episode, the lava lake formed in the crater reached its greatest volume of 44 million cubic meters (58 million cubic yards) and depth of 126 metres (414 ft). The final volume and depth of the lava lake after the end of the eruption on December 20 was approximately 38 million cubic meters (5038 million cubic yards) and 111 metres (365 ft), respectively. In 1988, a drilling project of Kilauea Iki showed that the lava lake depth was deeper than expected by 15–27 metres (50–90 ft). This was likely due to the crater floor collapsing during the 1959 eruption.

==== Precursors ====
Early warning signs of the impending eruption included outward tilting at the summit region and increased seismicity. Tiltmeter measurements between November 1957 and February 1959 indicated that magma was migrating towards the summit, causing swelling of the ground surface. Swelling ceased and deflation of the summit began after several earthquakes occurred on February 19, 1959. Slow deflation continued until a swarm of earthquakes in mid-August 1959 led to resumption of rapid swelling that continued until the eruption in November. Most of these earthquake swarms were at a depth of 40–60 kilometres (25–37 mi) and likely related to upward magma movement from the mantle. By early November, more than 1,000 earthquakes were being recorded each day and tiltmeter measurements indicated swelling 3 times faster than previous rates.

==== Lava fountaining ====
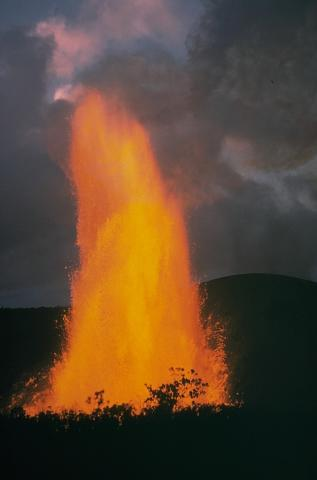
Lava fountaining at Kilauea Iki on December 11th, 1959

Lava fountaining is characteristic of Hawaiian eruptions and the 1959 eruption of Kilauea Iki produced some of the highest lava fountains ever observed in Hawaii. At the beginning of the eruption, the fountain height was only 30 metres (100 ft), but this increased over the next several days to between 200 and 300 metres (660 and 980 ft). On November 21, the fountain went from 210 meters (690 ft) tall to a few gas bubbles in less than 40 seconds. Some of the fountains were extraordinarily high, with the 15th episode producing a fountain reaching nearly 580 m (1,900 ft), among the highest ever recorded. After the end of each eruption episode, lava drained back into the vent which may have acted as a coolant for the underlying material, resulting in the triggering of the next episode of lava fountaining.

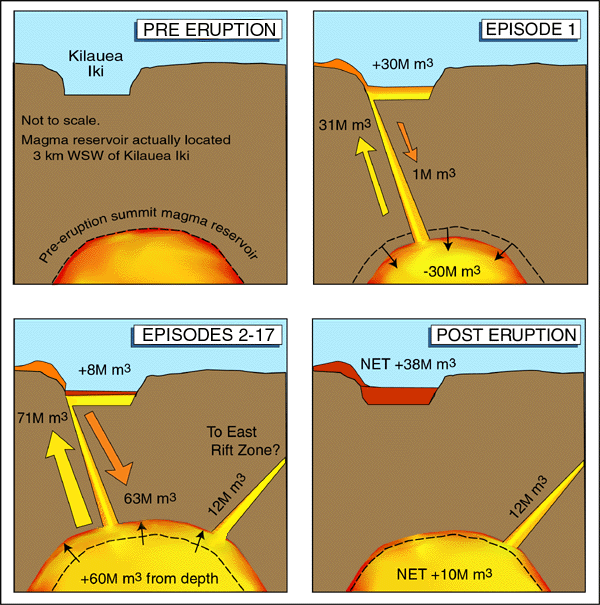
Magma Budget from USGS

==== Lava drainback ====
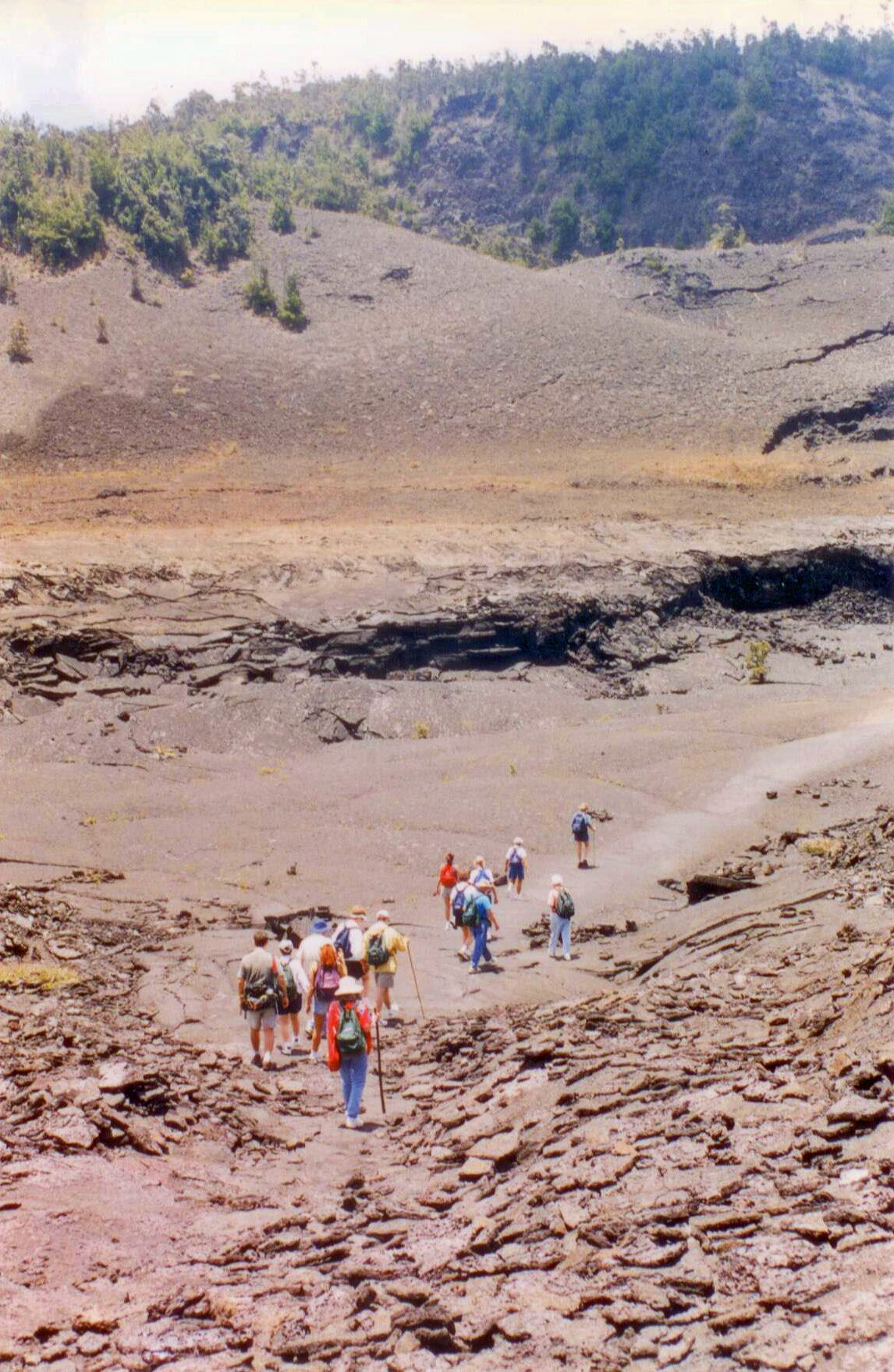
Tourists trekking along a well-worn path through the crater landscape, May 1999

Lava drainback is common during eruptions at Kilauea and occurs when magma erupts at the surface, forming a lava lake and then draining back below ground. During the Kilauea Iki eruption, the level of the lava lake would rise until it reached the erupting vent partway up the crater wall, where lava drainback would begin. The first episode had 31 million cubic meters (41 million cubic yards) of lava flow into Kīlauea Iki with 1 million cubic meters (1.3 million cubic yards) draining back. During the following episodes, a total of 71 million cubic meters (93 million cubic yards) of lava was ejected during a month-long eruption that stopped on December 20, 1959. Only 8 million cubic meters (10 million cubic yards) of lava remained, with 63 million cubic meters (82 million cubic yards) of lava draining back into the Kīlauea magma reservoir. Often the lava drainback had a higher rate of flow than the eruptions.

With every filling and draining of the lava lake, a "black ledge" was formed along the rim of the crater which marked the level of the lava lake during each eruption episode. During lava drainbacks, a giant counter-clockwise whirlpool would form.

==== Magma mixing ====
Samples collected from the first episode of the eruption were composed of two different kinds of magma. The first variant was identical to previous magmas erupted in the 1954 Kilauea caldera eruption and the second variant had a composition different from anything seen at previous eruptions, with a high ratio of CaO to MgO. Subsequent eruption episodes produced samples that were a mixture of the two variants plus some additional amount of olivine. The reason for two different magma compositions may be two magma storage areas beneath Kilauea Iki that had higher olivine concentrations at the bottom. At the beginning of the eruption, both magma sources provided material to the surface, while later eruption episodes at the single vent on the west side of the caldera contained a mixture of the two magmas. Additionally, the later eruption episodes were sourced from deeper sections of the magma chambers, resulting in higher concentrations of olivine.

==== Continuation and end ====
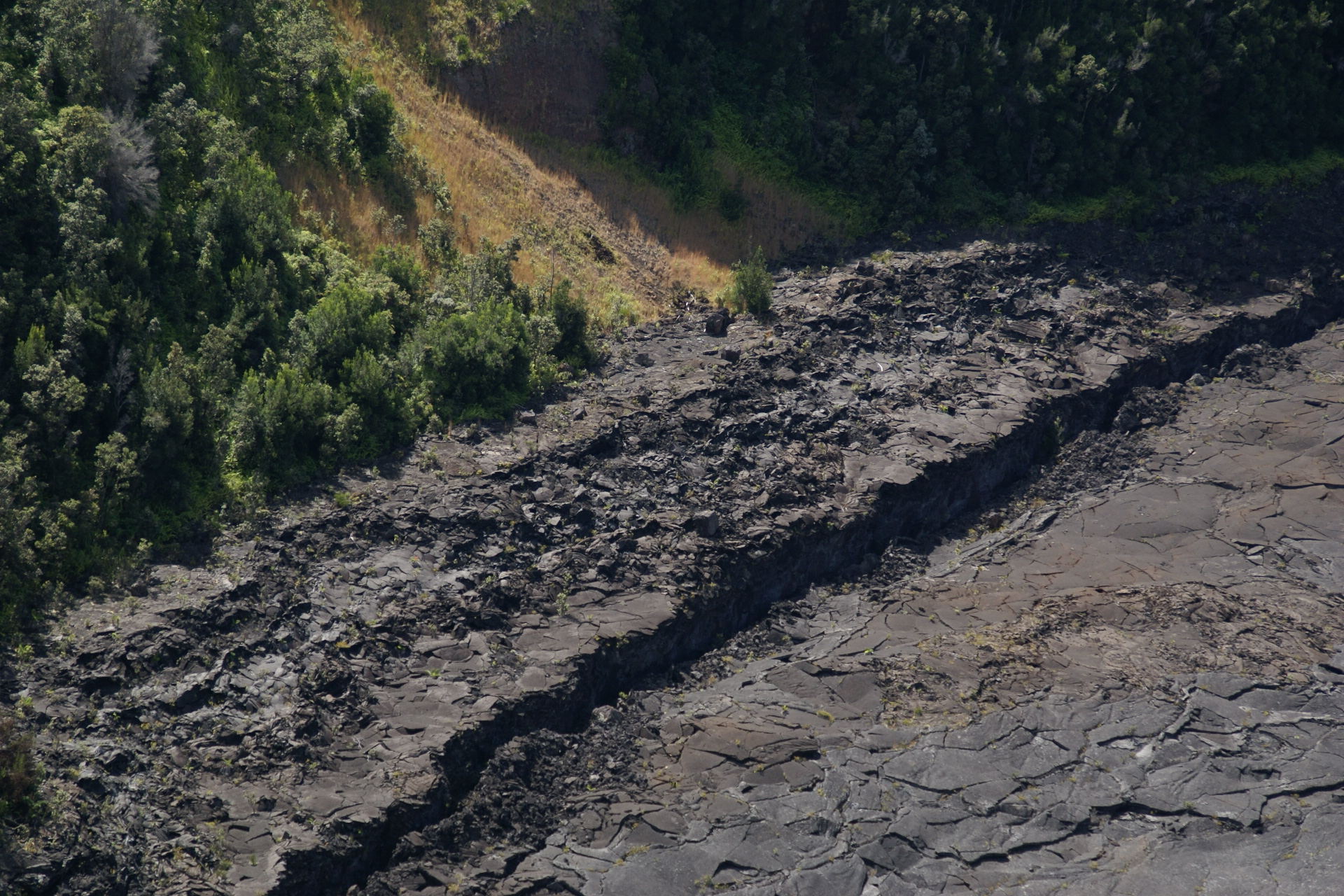
View of the solidified lava platform formed during cooling of the lava lake.

The eruption continued to December 19 with 16 more fountain episodes feeding the lava lake. These were shorter, with generally lower discharge and height. Peak discharge of 1.45×10^{6} m^{3} (1.90×10^{6} cu yd) per hour occurred for two hours on December 15 during the 12th episode. The fourth fountain added 20 meters (66 ft) depth, submerging the vent under 18 million tonnes of lava. Maximum lake depth of 126.2 m (414 ft) was reached on December 11.

After each fountain, lava drained back into the vent up to four times faster than it emerged. Lake level rose little overall. Drainage produced rumbling and fragmented the crust, sometimes forming a whirlpool over the vent. The largest drainback on December 5 after the fourth fountain reached 1.69×10^{6} m^{3} (2.21×10^{6} cu yd) per hour. Between fountains, the lake surface cooled, forming a circular solidified platform 15–60 meters (50–200 ft) wide, rising up to 15 meters (50 ft) above the lake at maximum. Over the lake center, the crust moved with convection currents, breaking into 3–6-meter (10–20 ft) plates resembling tectonic plates, with lava upwelling at one edge and subduction at the other. The eruption ended on the evening of December 19 with the 17th fountain subsiding.

==== Aftermath, measurements, and analysis ====
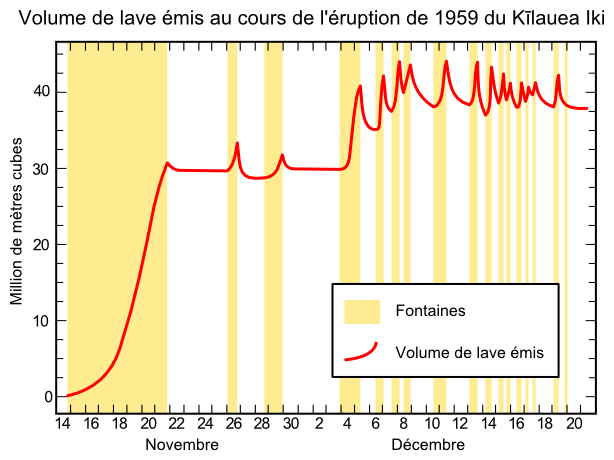
Magma budget diagram (red line) during the eruption across fountain episodes (orange zones).

The VEI 2 eruption emplaced 102×10^{6} m^{3} (133,000,000 cu yd) of lava, including 2.5×10^{6} m^{3} (3,300,000 cu yd) of tephra. Yet only 38×10^{6} m^{3} (50×10^{6} cu yd) remained the next day. Rapid drainback between fountains explained the discrepancy. Later analysis of summit inflation/deflation showed lava returned to Kīlauea's magma chamber, with some escaping to the East Rift Zone. An additional 10×10^{6} m^{3} (13×10^{6} cu yd) of magma entered the chamber. Paradoxically, more magma remained post-eruption. Increased pressure led to renewed activity fears, realized by seismic swarms in late December 1959 and early January 1960, culminating in over 1,000 events on January 12. Ground at Kapoho, 47 km (29 mi) east, subsided forming a graben. Lava erupted as fountains on January 13 evening, starting the month-long 1960 Kapoho eruption.

Four months post-eruption, drilling in the lake center encountered molten lava at 2.7 m (8.9 ft) depth. A 1968 drill studied chemical, mineralogical, and temperature variations in a cooling lava lake, penetrating 30 meters (98 ft) of crust to molten core at 60 meters (200 ft) without reaching the bottom. A 1988 drill found molten rock between 73 and 100 m (240 and 328 ft), revealing true lake depth of 135 m (443 ft) due to subsidence of the former floor into the underlying magma chamber. The lake fully solidified by the mid-1990s, over 30 years post-eruption.

Geologic map of the Kīlauea Caldera showing lava from Kīlauea Iki and ash isopachs forming the Devastation Area (green lines).

== Tourism ==
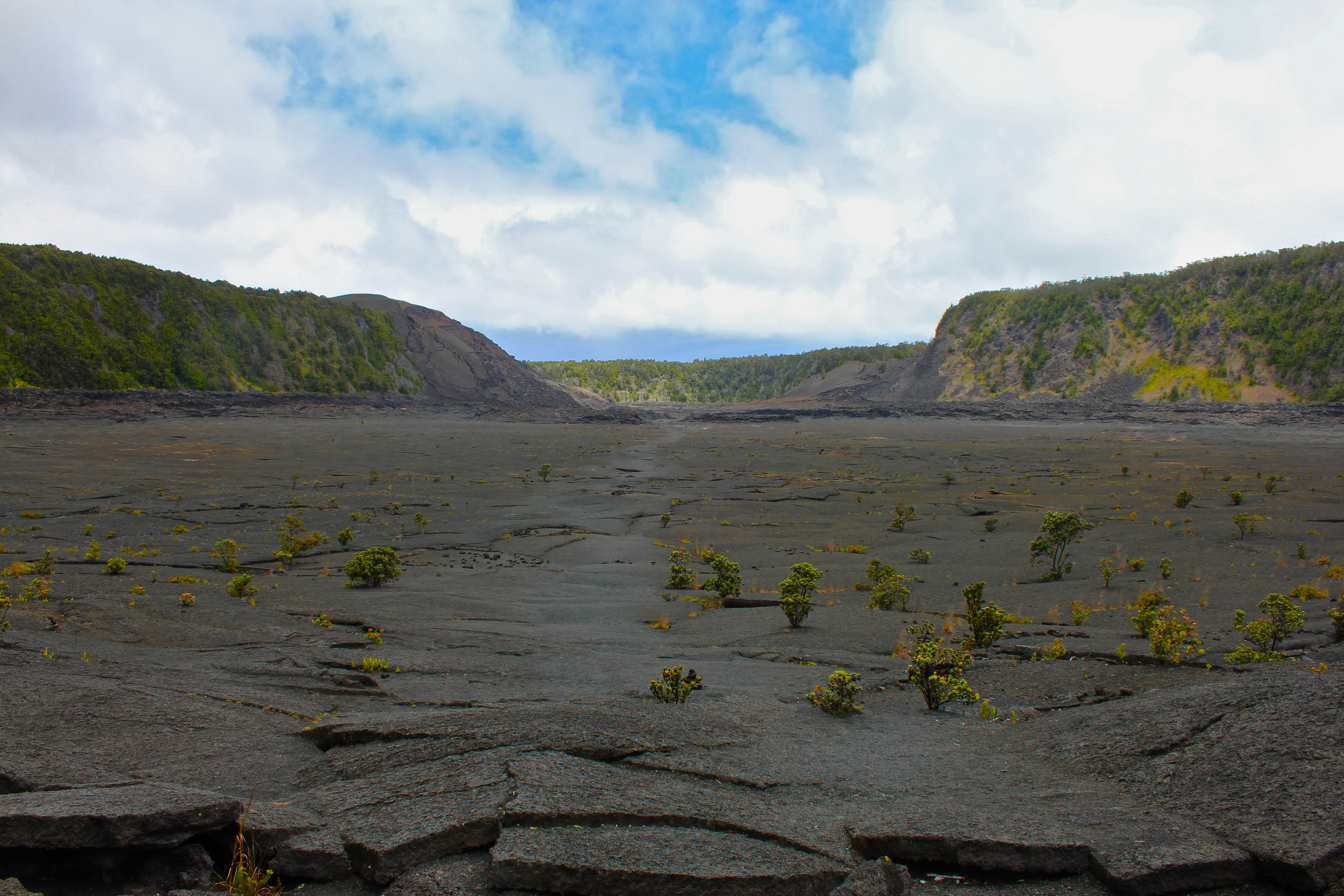
View of the Kīlauea Iki Trail from the crater floor toward Puʻu Puaʻi (left).

Kīlauea Iki is a popular attraction in Hawaii Volcanoes National Park due to its proximity to visitor facilities and distinctive volcanic features. Two overlooks are along Crater Rim Drive: Puʻu Puaʻi Overlook near the cone and start of the Devastation Trail through the Devastation Area, and Kīlauea Iki Overlook on the opposite rim. From the latter starts the loop Kīlauea Iki Trail, connecting to others including the Crater Rim Trail around the caldera.

The Kīlauea Iki Trail is about 6.5 km (4.0 mi) long, including 3.9 km (2.4 mi) across the crater, with 122 m (400 ft) elevation change, taking two to three hours; rated moderate by the park. Numbered markers correspond to a park guide explaining geologic and botanical features. On the crater floor, cairns called ahu mark the route.

The trail passes near the Thurston Lava Tube east of Kīlauea Iki, across Crater Rim Drive.

== See also ==
- 1960 eruption of Kīlauea
- Kīlauea Caldera
- Devastation Trail
