= Kīlauea Caldera =

Crater of a shield volcano in the Hawaii

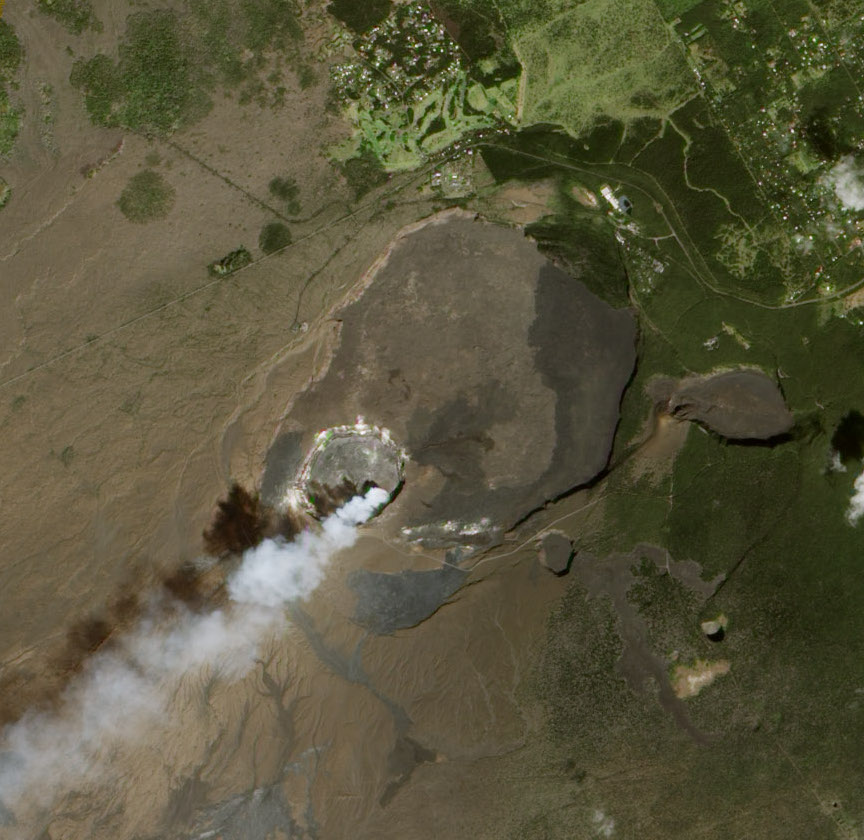
- Satellite image of the Kīlauea Caldera with a steam plume rising from Halemaʻumaʻu

Highest point
- Elevation: 3,589 ft (1,094 m)
- Coordinates: 19°24′43″N 155°16′33″W

Naming
- Native name: Kaluapele (Hawaiian)

Geography

Geology
- Last eruption: 1982

The Kīlauea Caldera (Hawaiian: Kaluapele), officially gazetted as Kīlauea Crater, is a caldera located at the summit of Kīlauea, an active shield volcano in the Hawaiian Islands. It has an extreme length of 2.93 mi (4.72 km), an extreme width of 1.95 mi (3.14 km), a circumference of 7.85 mi (12.63 km) and an area of 4.14 mi^{2} (10.7 km^{2}). It contains Halemaʻumaʻu, an active pit crater near the caldera's southwestern edge.

The walls of the caldera consist of fault scarps that have formed as a result of down-sinking of the caldera floor. Much of the caldera floor is covered by lava flows erupted since the 19th century. The Kīlauea Caldera and neighboring Kīlauea Iki are circled by Crater Rim Drive, an 11 mi (18 km) long paved road that provides access to Hawaiʻi Volcanoes National Park. The Hawaiian Volcano Observatory was established on the rim of the Kīlauea Caldera in 1912.

Outside of Halemaʻumaʻu, eruptions from the Kīlauea Caldera have taken place in 1982, 1975, 1974, 1971, 1921, 1919, 1918, and possibly in 1820 and 1790.

== See also ==
- List of volcanoes in the Hawaiian – Emperor seamount chain
- Kamoamoa
