= Halemaʻumaʻu =

Pit crater in the summit caldera of Kīlauea in Hawaii

Coordinates: 19°24′19″N 155°16′55″W

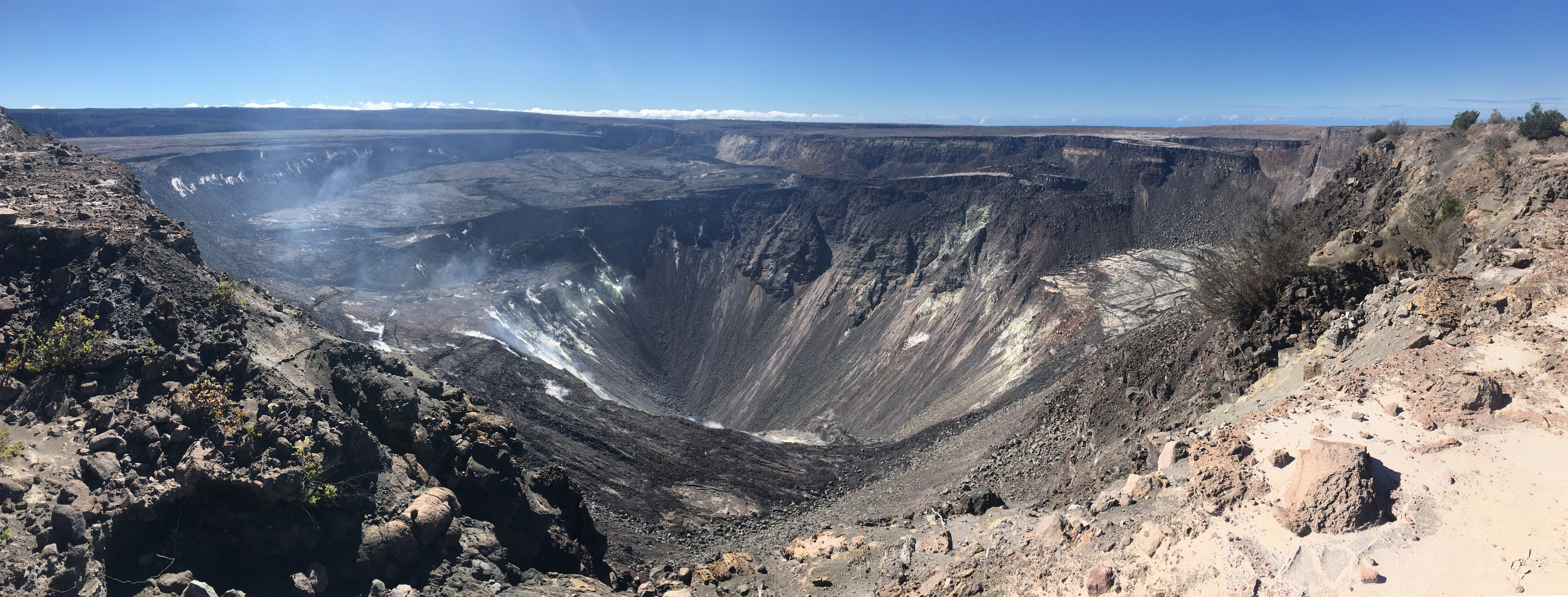
Halema'uma'u after the 2018 collapse events. The floor of the larger Kīlauea Caldera can be seen at left.

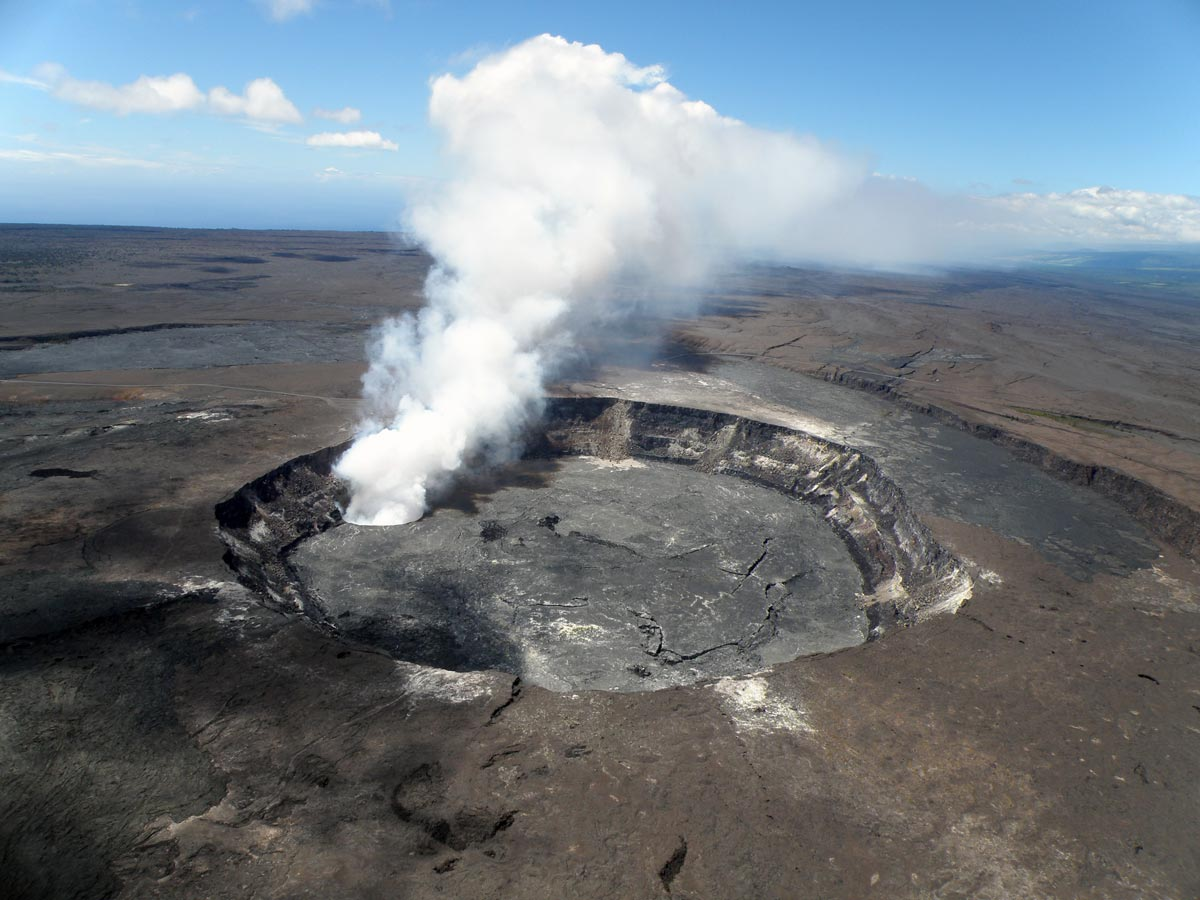
Aerial photo of Halemaʻumaʻu in 2009, showing a white plume being emitted by an active lava lake.

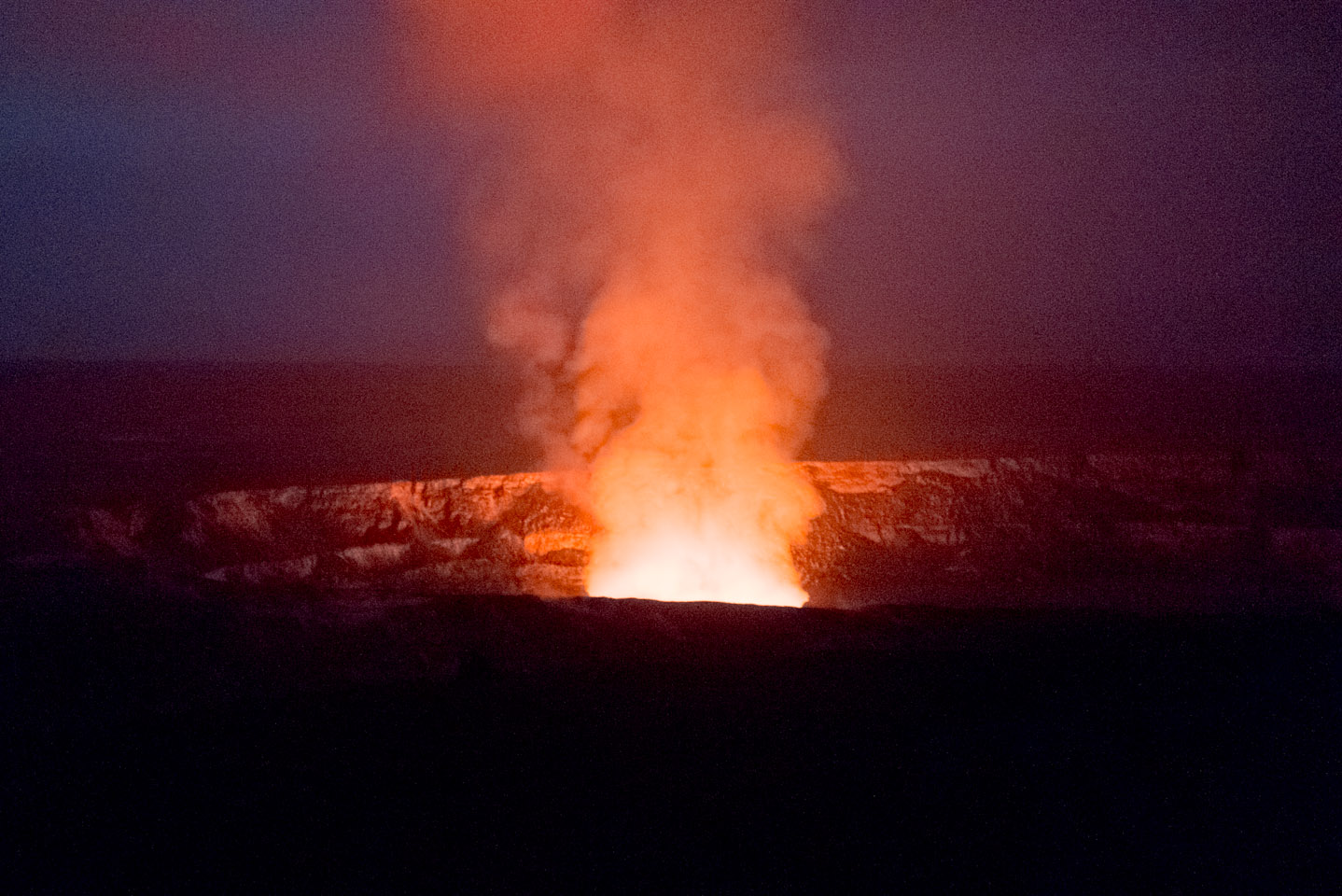
In March 2013, the glow from the lava lake at the bottom was clearly visible after dark.

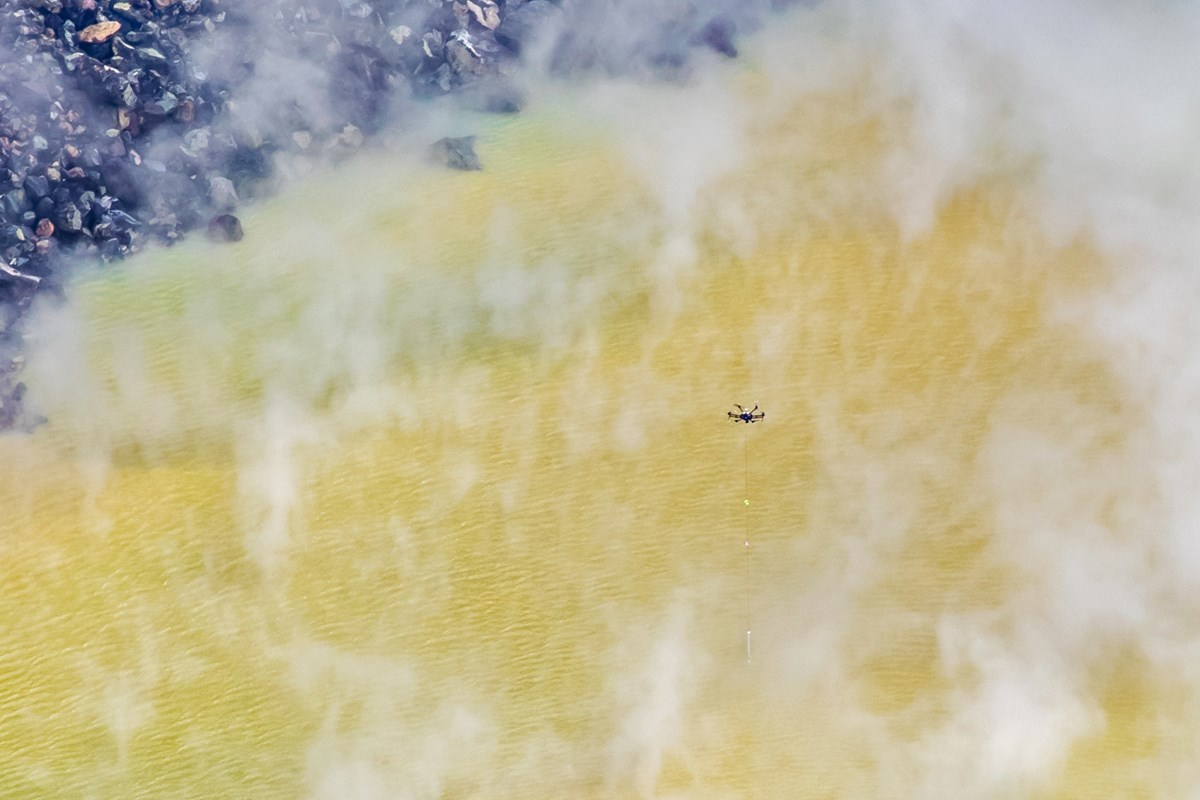
Halemaʻumaʻu Crater Lake in October 2019. The yellow water is the result of dissolved minerals and sulfur.

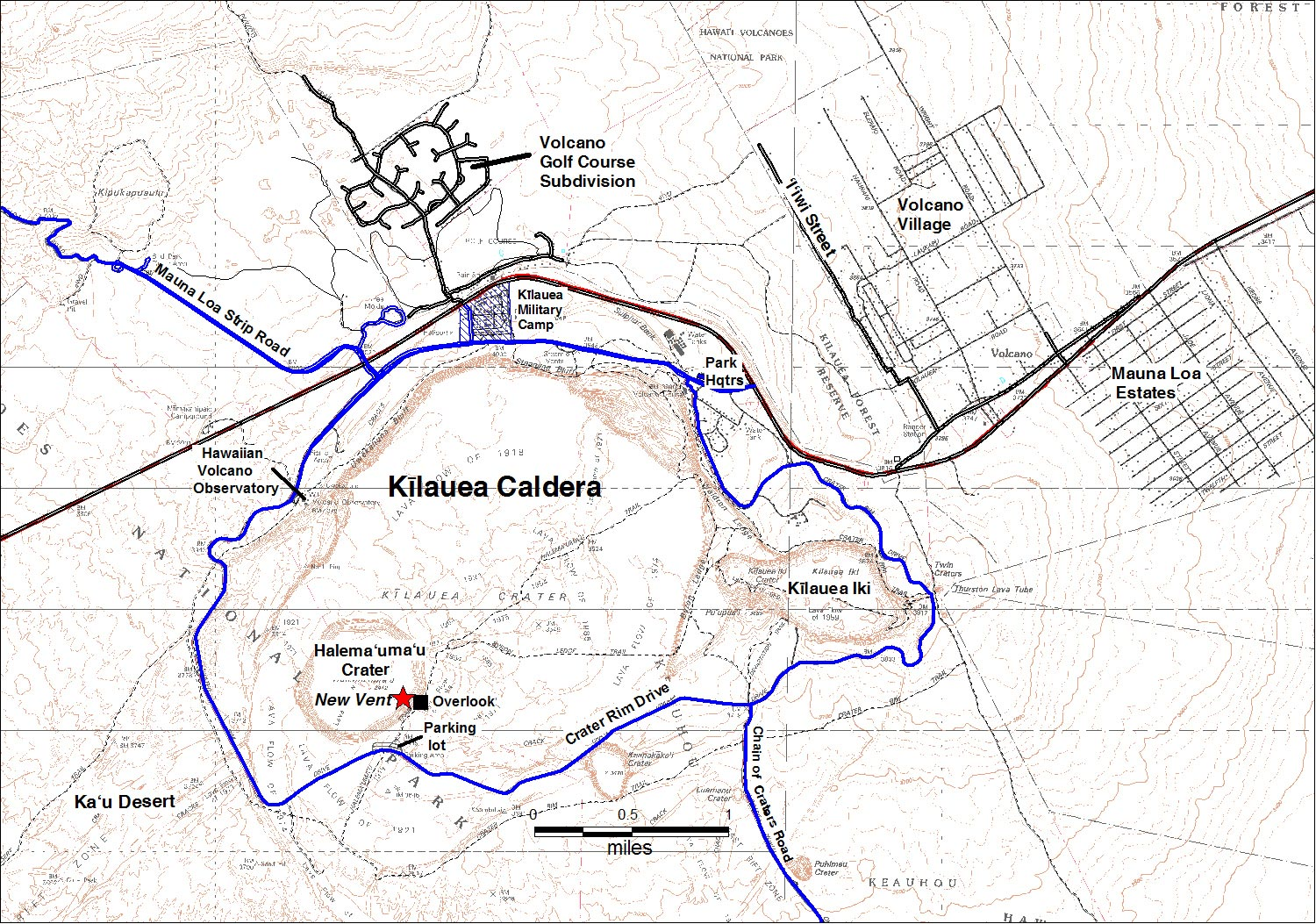
2008 Map of Kīlauea Caldera with Halemaʻumaʻu lower left.

Halemaʻumaʻu (Hawaiian: [hɐlɛˈmɐʔuˈmɐʔu]) anglicized as “Halemaumau” is a pit crater within the much larger Kīlauea Caldera at the summit of Kīlauea volcano on island of Hawaiʻi. The roughly circular crater was 770 m × 900 m (2,530 ft × 2,950 ft) before collapses that roughly doubled the size of the crater after May 3, 2018. Following the collapses of 2018, the bottom of Halemaʻumaʻu was roughly 600 m (2,000 ft) below the caldera floor. Halemaʻumaʻu is home to Pele, goddess of fire and volcanoes, according to the traditions of Hawaiian religion. Halemaʻumaʻu means "house of the ʻāmaʻu fern".

Halemaʻumaʻu contained an active lava lake for much of the time before 1924, and was the site of several eruptions during the 20th century. The crater again contained an active lava lake between 2008 and 2018, with the level of the lava usually fluctuating between 20 and 150 meters below Halemaʻumaʻu's crater floor, though at times the lava lake rose high enough to spill onto crater floor. The lava lake drained away in May 2018 as new volcanic vents opened in lower Puna. The subsidence of the lava lake was accompanied by a period of explosions, earthquakes, large clouds of ash and toxic gas, and finally a gradual collapse of the summit caldera around Halemaʻumaʻu. The collapse events ceased abruptly on August 2, 2018.

A small water pond appeared in Halemaʻumaʻu in the summer of 2019. The pond deepened and enlarged into a small lake after it was first observed, measuring 167 feet (51 m) deep on December 20, 2020. An eruption in December 2020 completely boiled away the water lake. This and several subsequent eruptions have partially refilled the crater with lava. The most recent eruption at Halemaʻumaʻu began on December 23, 2024, with episodes of fountaining continuing as of 2026.

== Geological history – 1823 to 2008 ==
=== 1823 to 1894: Caldera lava lake and formation of Halemaʻumaʻu ===
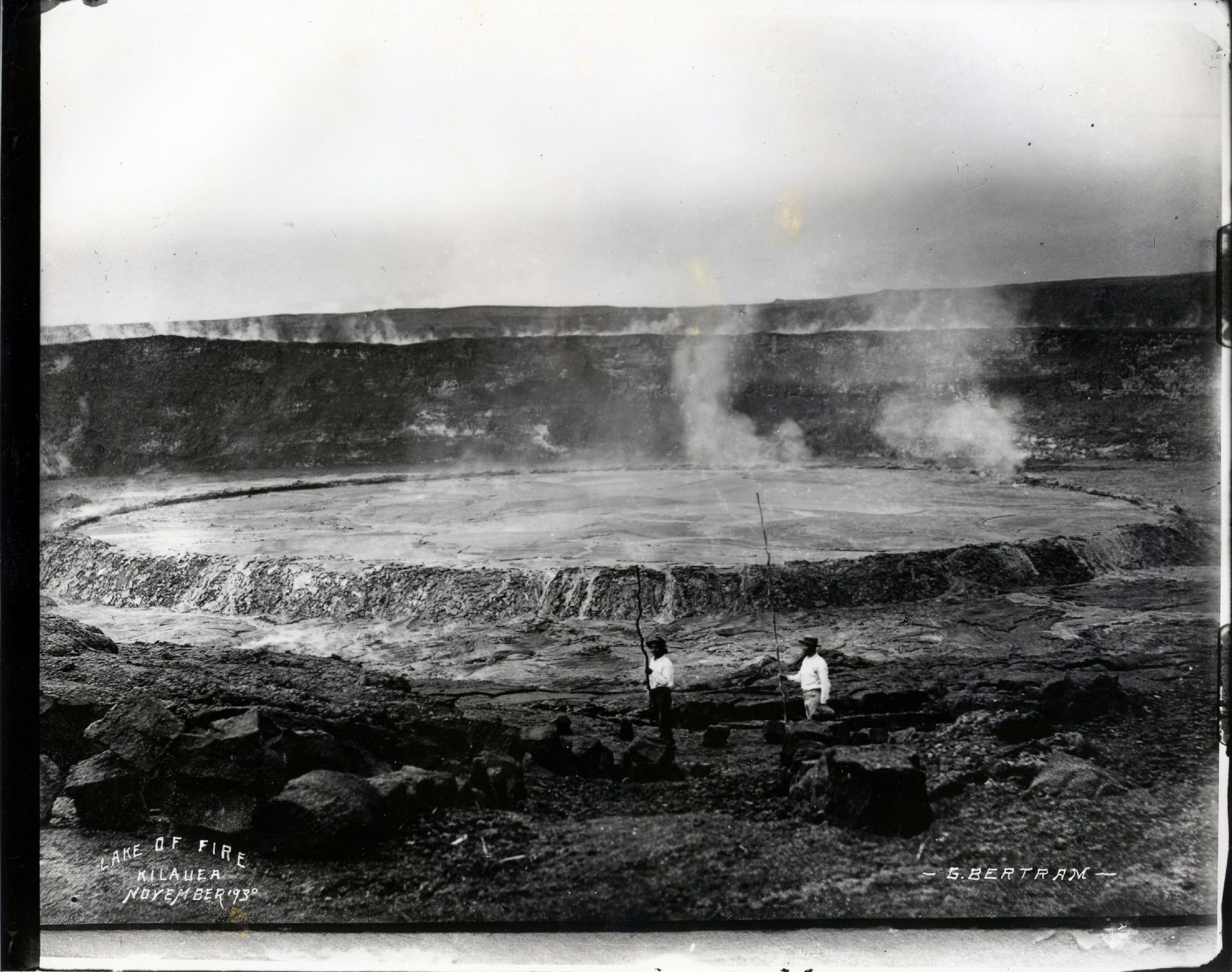
Halemaʻumaʻu lava lake, 1893

William Ellis, a British missionary and amateur ethnographer and geologist, published the first English description of Kīlauea Caldera as it appeared in 1823. Ellis observed a large lake of molten lava:

Astonishment and awe for some moments rendered us mute, and like statues, we stood fixed to the spot, with our eyes riveted on the abyss below. Immediately before us yawned an immense gulf, in the form of a crescent, about two miles (3.2 km) in length, from north-east to south-west, nearly a mile in width, and apparently 800 feet (240 m) deep. The bottom was covered with lava, and the south-west and northern parts of it were one vast flood of burning matter, in a state of terrific ebullition, rolling to and fro its "fiery surge" and flaming billows.

From the time Ellis made his observations in 1823 (and likely some time before that as well) through 1840, a lava lake was present within a broad region of Kīlauea Caldera. Between 1840 and 1894, the size of the lava lake gradually got smaller, becoming localized near the present site of Halemaʻumaʻu.

In 1866, Mark Twain, an American humorist, satirist, lecturer, and writer hiked to the Caldera floor. He wrote the following account of the lake of molten lava which he found there:

It was like gazing at the sun at noon-day, except that the glare was not quite so white. At unequal distances all around the shores of the lake were nearly white-hot chimneys or hollow drums of lava, four or five feet high, and up through them were bursting gorgeous sprays of lava-gouts and gem spangles, some white, some red and some golden—a ceaseless bombardment, and one that fascinated the eye with its unapproachable splendor. The more distant jets, sparkling up through an intervening gossamer veil of vapor, seemed miles away; and the further the curving ranks of fiery fountains receded, the more fairy-like and beautiful they appeared.

Following an earthquake swarm in December 1894, the lava lake fully drained away from Kīlauea's summit, ending the decades-long period of nearly continuous activity. After the disappearance of lava, Halemaʻumaʻu was left behind as a circular pit crater 360 metres (1,180 ft) wide. Sporadic eruptions took place within Halemaʻumaʻu over the following decade, while continued collapse events deepened Halemaʻumaʻu to 300 metres (980 ft) by March 1899.

=== 1906 to 1924: Reemergence of lava lake and explosive eruption ===
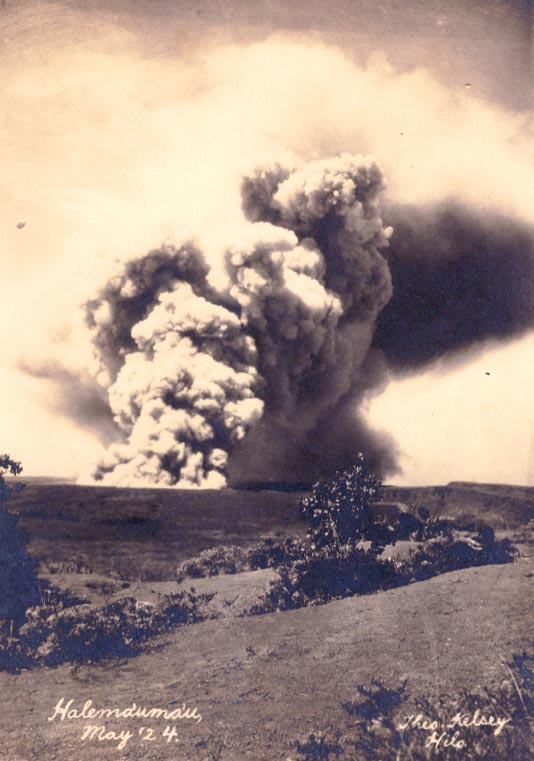
Ash cloud emitted from Halemaʻumaʻu during the 1924 explosive eruptions

By the end of 1906, the lava lake was again present nearly all of the time. At the time geologist Thomas Jaggar opened the Hawaiian Volcano Observatory in 1912, Halemaʻumaʻu was nearly full with active lava.

In February 1924, Halemaʻumaʻu's lava lake drained away, again leaving behind a pit crater 150 metres (490 ft) deep. Beginning on April 29, of that year, the crater floor began to collapse, eventually deepening to more than 210 metres (690 ft) deep by May 7, 1924.

Beginning during the night of May 9–10, 1924, a period of explosive eruptions took place at Halemaʻumaʻu. The explosions emitted large explosive columns of ash and other debris up to 9 kilometres (5.6 mi) high that precipitated on surrounding communities. In the community of Glenwood, 16 kilometres (9.9 mi) from Halemaʻumaʻu, gutters on the roof of a store collapsed due to the weight of muddy ash. The explosive blasts also ejected rocks out of Halemaʻumaʻu, some as large as 14 tons. One person was killed during an explosion on May 18 after being crushed by falling debris. The explosions continued for two and a half weeks, finally ceasing on May 27.

Halemaʻumaʻu more than doubled in size during the eruption. The crater's diameter grew to approximately 1,000 metres (3,300 ft), while the crater's depth increased to about 285 metres (935 ft).

=== 1924 to 1982: Short-lived eruptions partially fill Halemaʻumaʻu ===
After the 1924 events, seven eruptions occurred within Halemaʻumaʻu between 1924 and 1934, partly refilling the crater. Following the 1934 eruption, Halemaʻumaʻu was relatively quiet until 1952, when a six-month long eruption took place. Subsequent eruptions in the 1950s, 1960s, and 1970s partially refilled the crater. A 1982 eruption covered a small portion of the northeastern crater floor.

== 2008 to 2018 eruptive activity ==
=== Beginning of the eruption ===
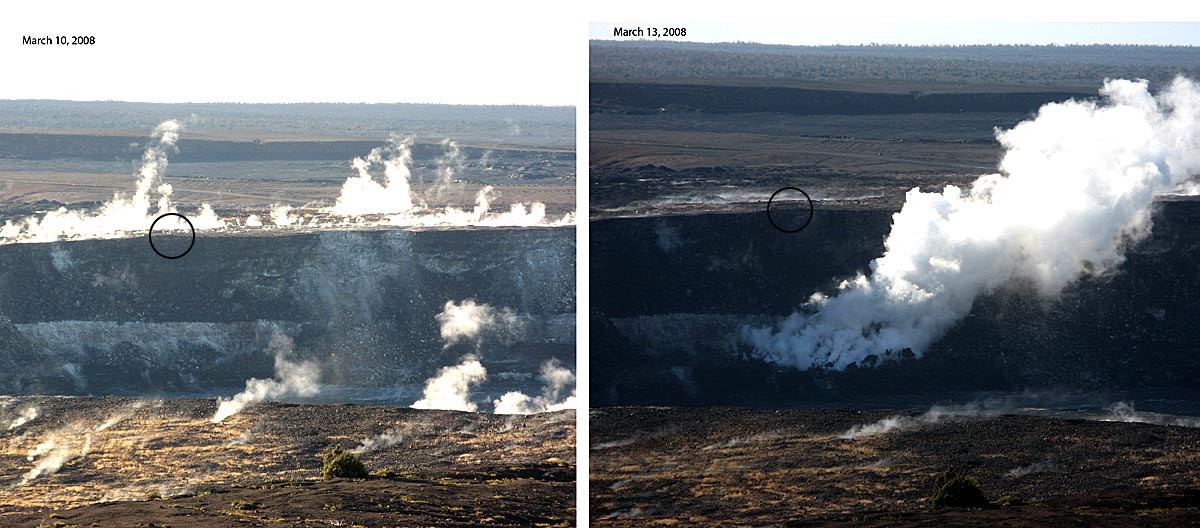
Before and after comparison of the new gas vent. The crater overlook is circled for reference.

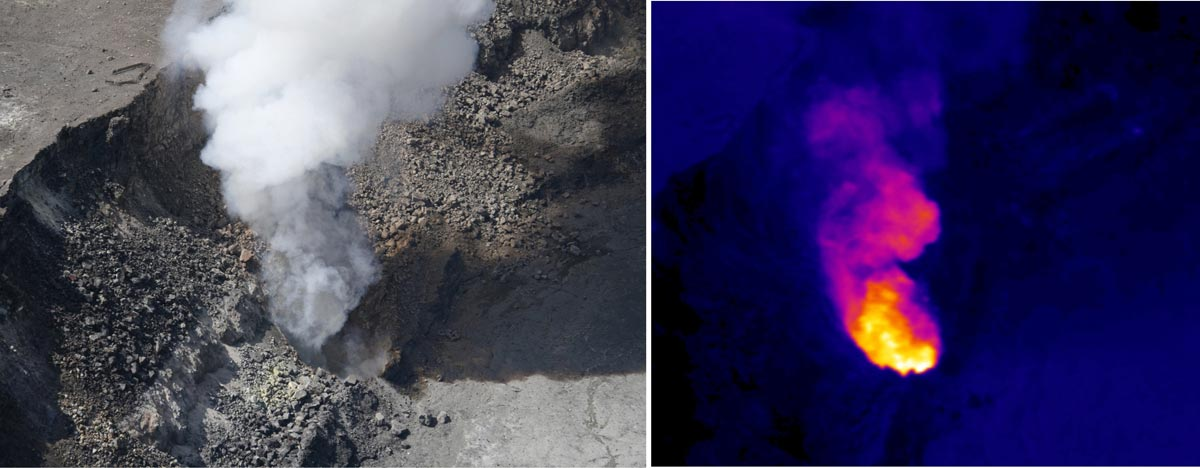
An April 3, 2008 aerial view of the March 19 explosion site.

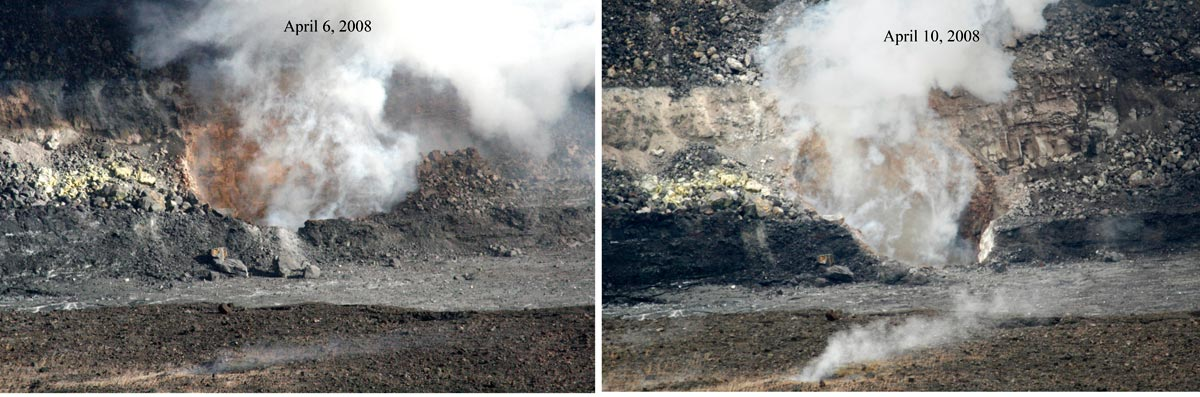
Before and after view of second explosion on April 9, 2008

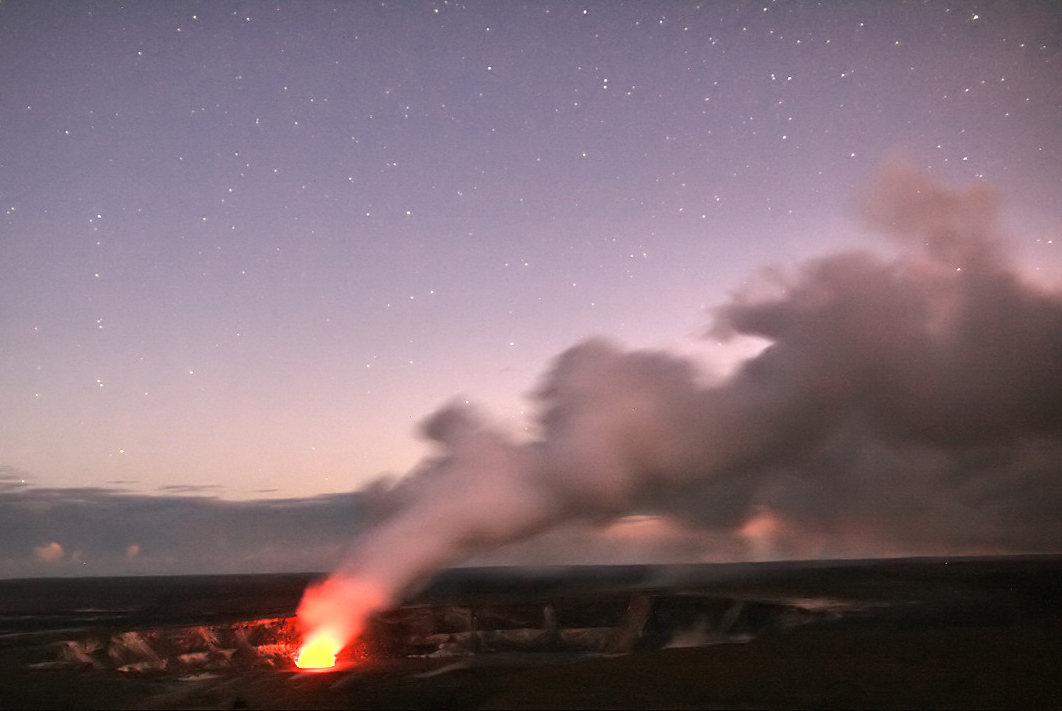
At night, an incandescent glow illuminates the venting gas plume on September 21, 2008

Halemaʻumaʻu was quiet for 25 years after the 1982 eruption, with eruptive activity at Kīlauea being focused on the volcano's east rift zone beginning in 1983. However, Hawaiian Volcano Observatory scientists observed a gradual increase in activity beginning in late 2007, including an increase in sulfur dioxide emissions and an increase in seismic tremor. By March 2008, these parameters were several times higher than normal.

Crater activity began to increase when between March 10 and March 14, 2008, gas began to vent from the east wall fumarole directly below the Crater Overlook. At 02:58 am HST on March 19, 2008, HVO personnel recorded seismic events, and sunrise revealed a 20–30 meter (65–100-foot) diameter hole blown in the side where the vent once was; the explosion scattered debris and spatter across 0.30 square kilometers (74 acres) and damaged the Crater Overlook. Pieces as large as 20 millimeters (1 in) were found on Crater Rim Drive while 0.3 m (1 ft) blocks hit the crater overlook area. This was the first explosive eruption of Halemaʻumaʻu since 1924, and the first lava eruption from the crater since 1982. The new crater formed in the explosion was informally named "Overlook Crater" by Hawaiian Volcano Observatory staff.

Sulfur dioxide gas emissions increased rapidly at the beginning of the episode. On March 13, HVO recorded a rate of 2,000 tons/day, the highest rate since measurements began in 1979. A concentration of over 40 ppm on Crater Rim Drive was measured, prompting alerts and other public safety measures. Halemaʻumaʻu continued to intermittently emit high levels of volcanic gases, ash, spatter, Pele's Tears, and Pele's Hair until the second episode.

Another explosive event occurred during the night of April 9, 2008, which widened the Overlook Crater by an additional 5–10 meters (16–33 feet), ejected debris over some 60 m (200 ft) and further damaged the overlook as well as scientific monitoring instruments.

In response to the second episode, scientists and local government officials on April 9, 2008, ordered hundreds of people to evacuate from the Park and nearby villages because the sulfur dioxide concentration levels had reached a critical level and a hazardous vog plume extended downwind from the crater. The evacuation lasted two days.

On April 16, 2008, a third significant explosive event occurred at Halemaʻumaʻu, spreading ash and debris throughout the area. Subsequently, a second evacuation of the park and surrounding areas was ordered on April 23, 2008.

Activity continued through the next few months, with Halemaʻumaʻu continuing to emit a plume of ash and gases. A fourth explosive event occurred on August 1, 2008, and a fifth on August 27, 2008.

=== September 2008: Lava lake becomes visible ===
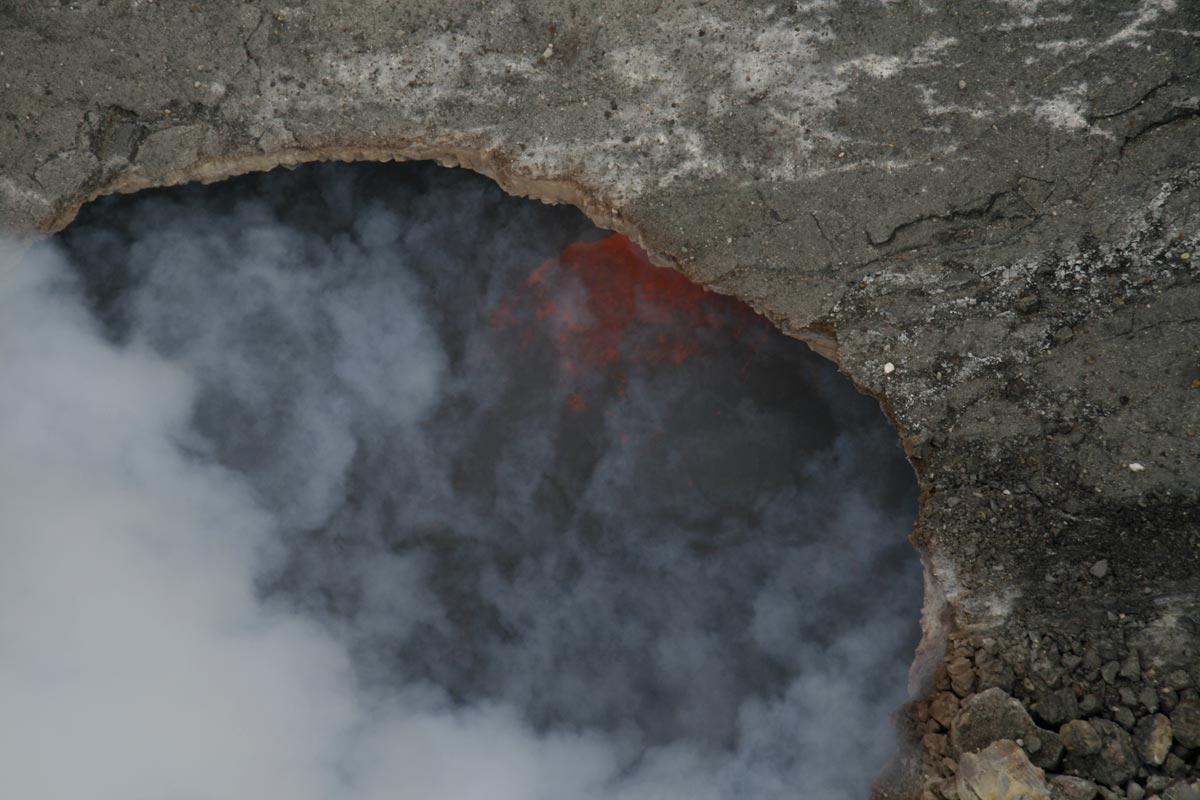
Aerial view of lava lake in vent crater September 5, 2008

A Hawaii Volcano Observatory news release and images dated September 5, 2008, confirmed the first recorded images of a lava lake 130 feet below the lip of the Overlook Crater. The HVO had alluded to the presence of lava within the vent, including the sporadic ejecting of lava materials from the vent due to explosive episodes, but this gave officials the first opportunity to visually confirm that active lava was present. The report also noted that the lava could not be seen from observation points around the crater.

=== September 2008 to April 2018: Sustained lava lake ===
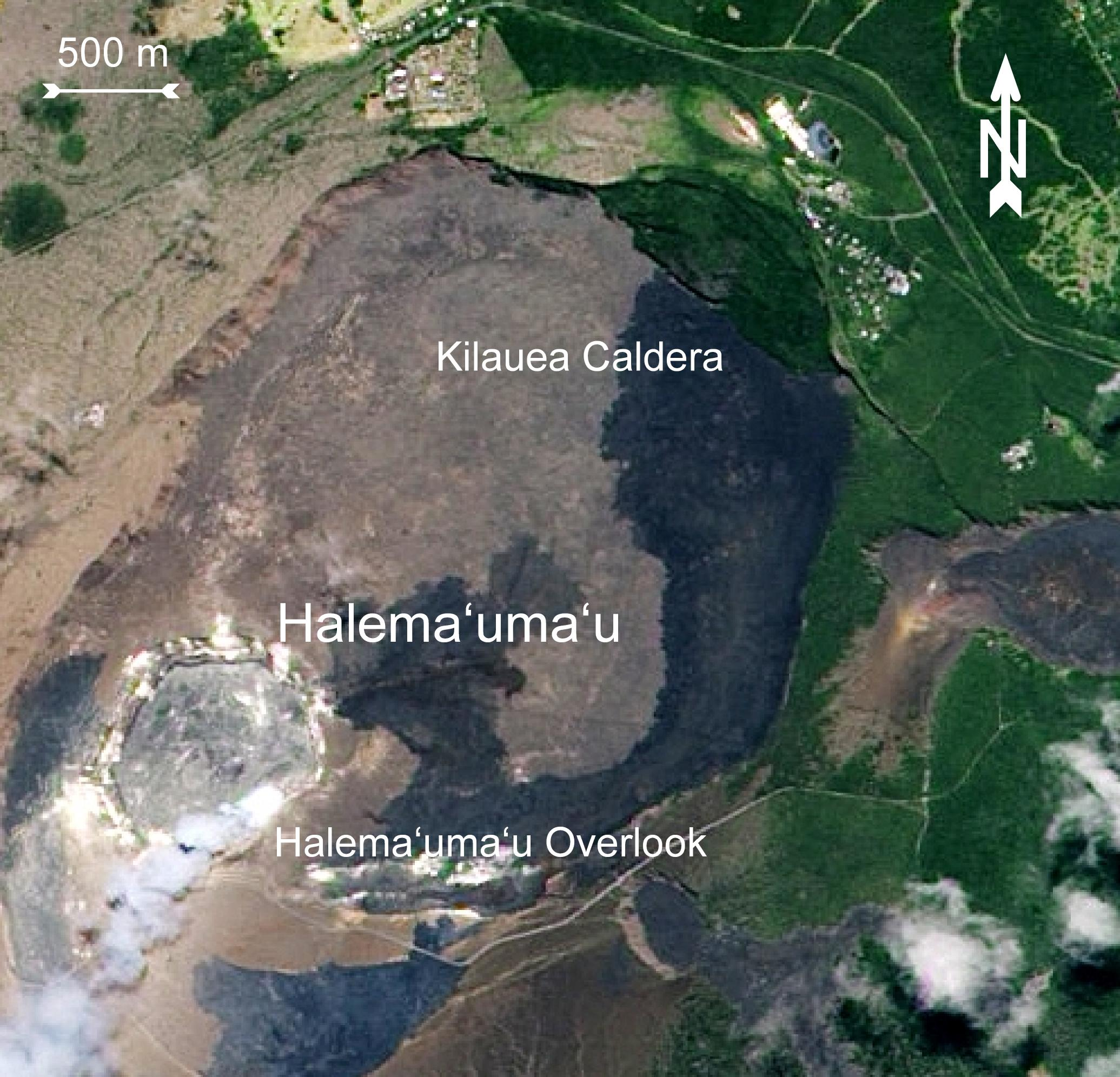
Halemaʻumaʻu aerial, 2010

The lava lake within Halemaʻumaʻu's Overlook Crater vent was visible nearly continuously from March 2008 until May 2018. During the period, the Overlook Crater slowly enlarged. The height of the lava lake fluctuated. In May 2015, the lake rose high enough to spill onto the Halemaʻumaʻu crater floor for the first time, adding a layer of lava approximately 30 feet (9 m) thick to the crater floor.

For three years from 2015 to 2018 the lava lake level remained close to the rim, with a further minor overflow event in October 2016 and a significant one in April 2018 that covered a majority of the crater floor in new lava.

In April 2018, a significant series of overflows had reportedly covered most of the Halemaʻumaʻu crater floor with new lava.

=== April to July 2018: Drainage of lava lake and the collapse of the summit caldera ===
On April 30, the Puʻu ʻŌʻō crater on Kīlauea's east rift zone collapsed. Several days later, lava began to emerge from fissures on the lower east rift zone in Leilani Estates. On May 1, concurrent with the shift of activity on Kīlauea's east rift zone, the summit lava lake within Halemaʻumaʻu's Overlook Crater began to drop; the US Geological Survey's status update on the evening of May 6 reported that Halemaʻumaʻu's Overlook Crater lava lake had dropped by 722 feet (220 m) since April 30. By May 10, the lava lake was no longer visible. Geologists believed that the draining of the lava lake was driven by a steady withdrawal of magma from Kīlauea's summit to feed the eruption on the volcano's lower east rift zone. Several small explosive events occurred between May 16 and May 26, ejecting ash and small blocks within a few hundred meters of the vent. An explosion on May 17 created an ash plume that reached 30,000 feet (9,100 m) above sea level.

Beginning near the end of May, the floor of Kīlauea Caldera around Halemaʻumaʻu began to subside in a series of 62 separate collapse events. At each collapse event the floor of the caldera dropped several meters and there was a magnitude 5.2 to 5.4 earthquake. Between each collapse event, an escalating swarm of earthquakes would occur. Notably, more than 700 earthquakes of a magnitude 4.0 or higher occurred each day during the collapse period. The collapse events enlarged and deepened Halemaʻumaʻu. The crater's volume increased from about 54-60 million cubic meters (1,907–2,119 cubic feet) to 885 million cubic meters (31,253 cubic feet) and the depth of the crater increased by more than 500 metres (1,600 ft), to a depth roughly 600 metres (2,000 ft) below the floor of the summit caldera. During the collapse, the former Halemaʻumaʻu overlook and its parking lot were lost when segments of the crater rim slumped into the crater. The summit collapse events ceased abruptly on August 2, 2018, two days before the eruptive activity on Kīlauea's east rift zone decreased significantly.

== 2019–20 water lake ==
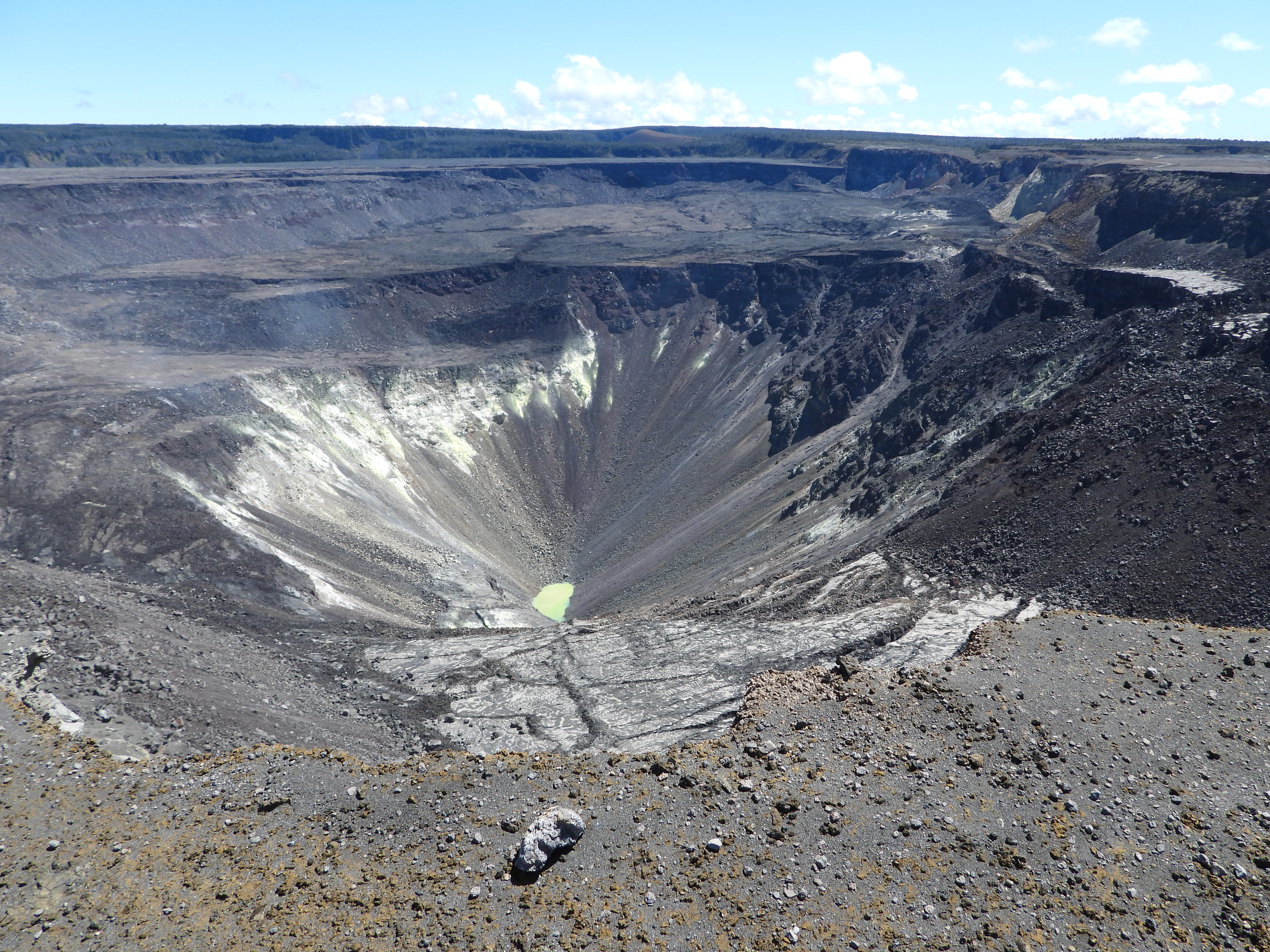
View of the water pond within Halema'uma'u on September 27, 2019

In late July 2019, helicopter pilots reported seeing a green pond of water at the bottom of the much-deepened Halema'uma'u crater. Geologists from the Hawaiian Volcano Observatory confirmed the presence of water during a helicopter fly-over on August 1, 2019. Further observation in August showed the pond was rising, with a water temperature of about 160 °F (71 °C).

Hawaiian Volcano Observatory scientists believe that the lake formed because the 2018 collapse events caused the floor of Halemaʻumaʻu to collapse below the level of the local water table. The scientists suspect that the water table likely collapsed along with the rest of the crater but began to recover elevation after the collapse. Because the bottom of Halemaʻumaʻu was believed to be roughly 520 metres (1,710 ft) lower than level of the area water table after the collapse, water was able to inundate the crater floor as it rose. The lake marked the first time in recorded history that liquid water appeared in Halemaʻumaʻu crater in the form of a crater lake, though the US Geological Survey noted that at least one other small pond, thought to mark a body of perched water trapped by dikes, was present in the caldera just north of Halemaʻumaʻu prior to the caldera's collapse in 2018.

As of July 2020, the dimensions of the water lake were approximately 885 by 430 feet (270 by 131 m), covering an area of about six acres and containing over 125,000,000 US gallons (470,000 m^{3}) of water. The lake was over 130 feet (40 m) deep, and had risen an average of 2.5 feet (0.76 m) each week since the lake was first seen in July 2019. The lake continued to deepen through December 2020 and measured 167 feet (51 m) deep, before the onset of an eruption that began on December 20.

== 2020–21 eruption ==
On December 20, 2020, at 9:30 pm local time, an eruption broke out within Halemaʻumaʻu. The US Geological Survey's Hawaiian Volcano Observatory reported that three vents were feeding lava into the bottom of Halemaʻumaʻu Crater, boiling off the water lake that had been growing since summer 2019 and replacing it with a lava lake. The observatory reported that the eruption created a plume that reached 30,000 feet in elevation. The eruption had been preceded by earthquake swarms centered under Kīlauea Caldera on November 30, 2020, and December 2, 2020, the second of which was interpreted as a small intrusion of magma.

County emergency officials reported that the eruption had stabilized by the following morning and that two of the three vents remained active and continued to fill the floor of Halemaʻumaʻu with lava. As of 7:30 a.m. on December 25, 2020, the lava lake had filled in 176 metres (577 ft) of the crater and the level of the lake was continuing to rise. As of 1 February 2021, the western-most vent remained active and the lava lake had increased to a depth of about 212 metres (696 ft), though the eastern portion of the lava lake had stagnated.

On May 26, 2021, the Hawaiian Volcano Observatory announced in a daily update that Kīlauea was no longer erupting. Lava supply to the lava lake appeared to have ceased between May 11 and May 13, and the lava lake had completely crusted over by May 20. The last surface activity in Halemaʻumaʻu was observed on May 23. At the time eruptive activity ceased, the lava lake was 229 metres (751 ft) deep and had a volume of approximately 41.2 million cubic metres (10.9 billion US gallons).

== 2021–22 eruption ==
The Hawaiian Volcano Observatory began to record increased earthquake activity and changes in ground deformation patterns at Kīlauea's summit at about noon local time on September 29, 2021. An eruption began at 3:20 p.m. local time when several fissures opened within Halemaʻumaʻu crater in Kīlauea's summit caldera. During the initial stages of the eruption, lava erupted in fountains more than 200 feet (61 m) tall, though the height of the fountains declined as the level of lava in the crater rose, partially drowned the erupting vents.

The eruption continued until December 9, 2022, when lava supply to the active lava lake ceased and the lake surface crusted over. On December 13, 2022, the Hawaiian Volcano Observatory determined that the eruption had ended. Over the course of the eruption, 111 million m^{3} (29 billion U.S. gal) of lava had been effused, and the floor of Halemaʻumaʻu had risen 143 meters (469 ft), since the beginning of the eruption on September 29, 2021.

== 2023 eruptions ==
On January 5, 2023, the Hawaiian Volcano Observatory reported that Kīlauea began erupting within Halema‘uma‘u at approximately 4:34 p.m. HST. Fountain of up to 50 meters (160 feet) high were reported. New lava flows inundated much of the crater floor and by 7:30 p.m. about 10 meters (33 feet) depth of new lava had been added to the crater floor. The eruption ended 61 days later on March 7, 2023. Three months after the end of the previous eruption, another eruption began on June 7, 2023. On September 10, 2023, a new eruption began at approximately 3:15 HST. This eruption was contained within Halemaʻumaʻu crater and on the down dropped block to the east in Kīlauea's summit caldera. The eruption lasted one week, ending September 16.

== 2024-26 eruptions ==
On December 23, 2024, an eruption began within Halemaʻumaʻu. 55 episodic eruptions, including lava fountains over 540 meters (1770 feet) high, have occurred as of October 1, 2026 from two vents, with the episodes usually lasting less than 12 hours and being separated by two weeks or more.

== Gallery ==
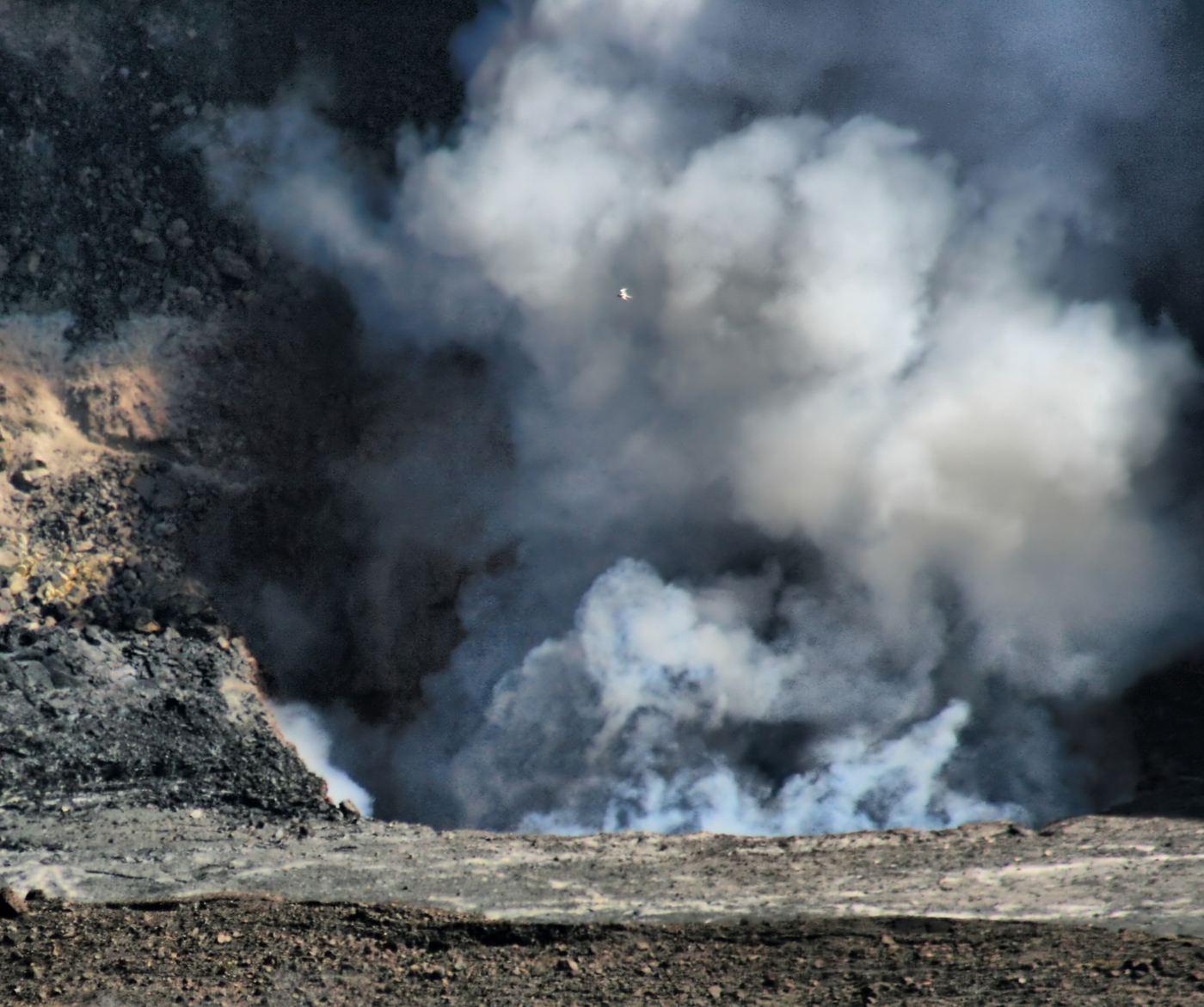
White-tailed tropicbird flying directly over the Halemaʻumaʻu vent, 2008

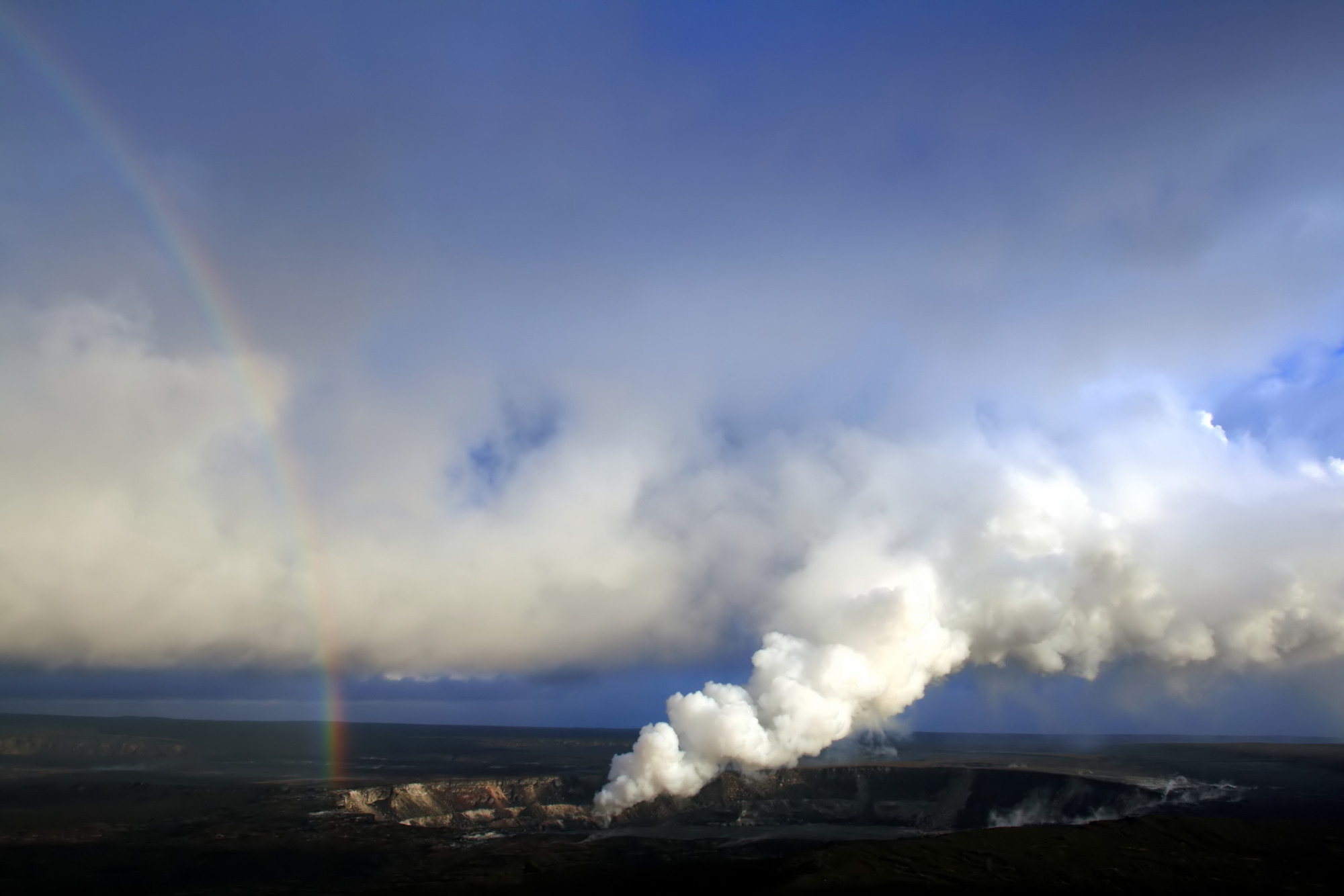
A sulfur dioxide plume after an explosive 2008 eruption.

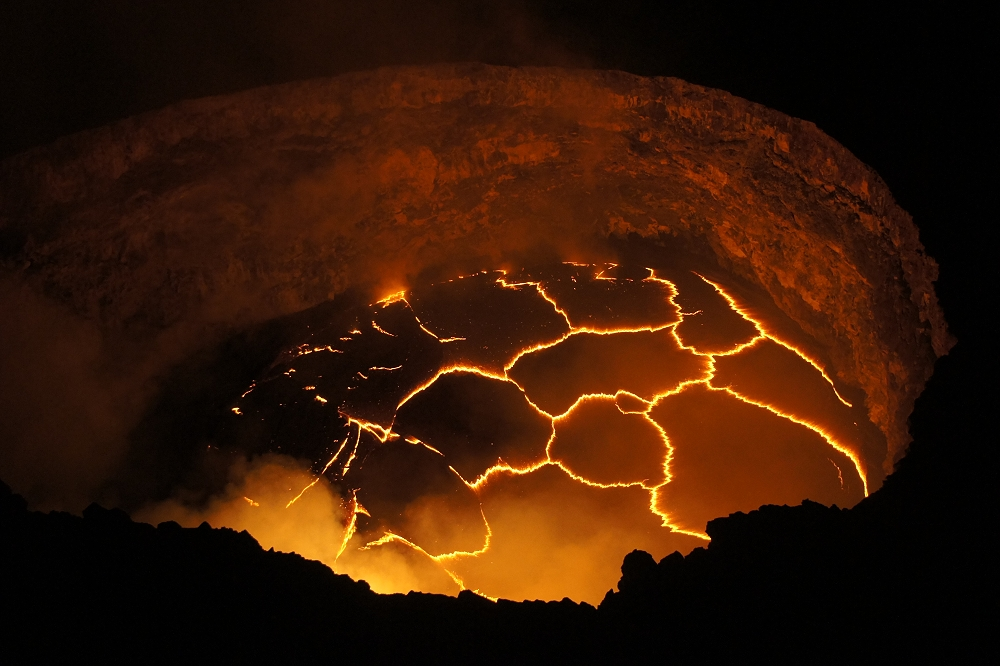
Halemaʻumaʻu, 2012

Time lapse video of Halemaʻumaʻu, 2014

Time lapse video of the lava lake in Halemaʻumaʻu, 2016

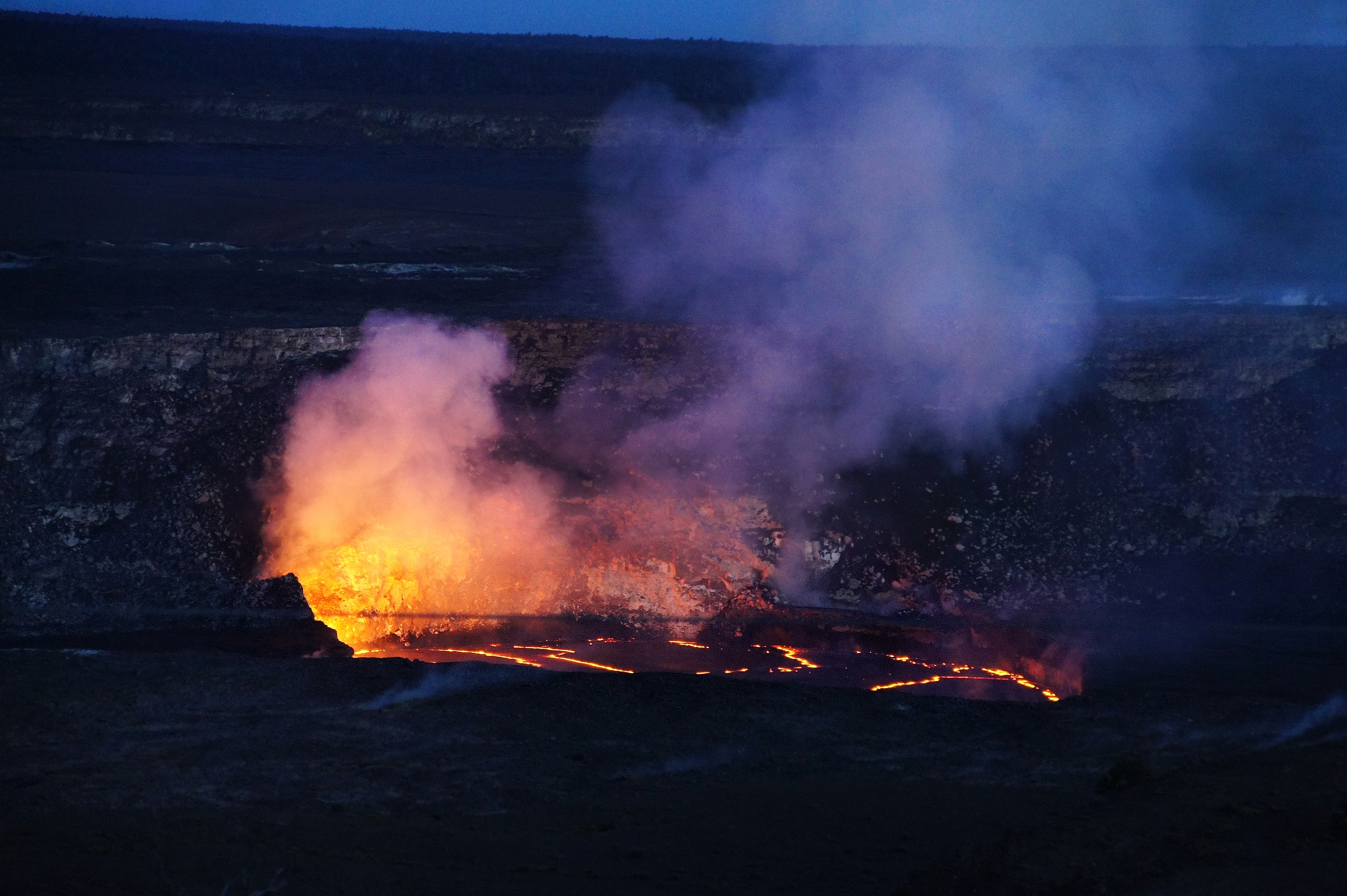
Halemaʻumaʻu, 2017

Time lapse video of Halemaʻumaʻu, 2017

The lava lake in Halemaʻumaʻu, 2023
