= Huntzinger =

Huntzinger is a surname. Notable people with the surname include:

- Brock Huntzinger (born 1988), American baseball pitcher
- Hugo Huntzinger (1934–1993), American National Park Service executive
- Jacques Huntzinger (born 1943), French ambassador
- Walt Huntzinger (1899–1981), American baseball pitcher
