= Pauahi Crater =

Volcanic crater

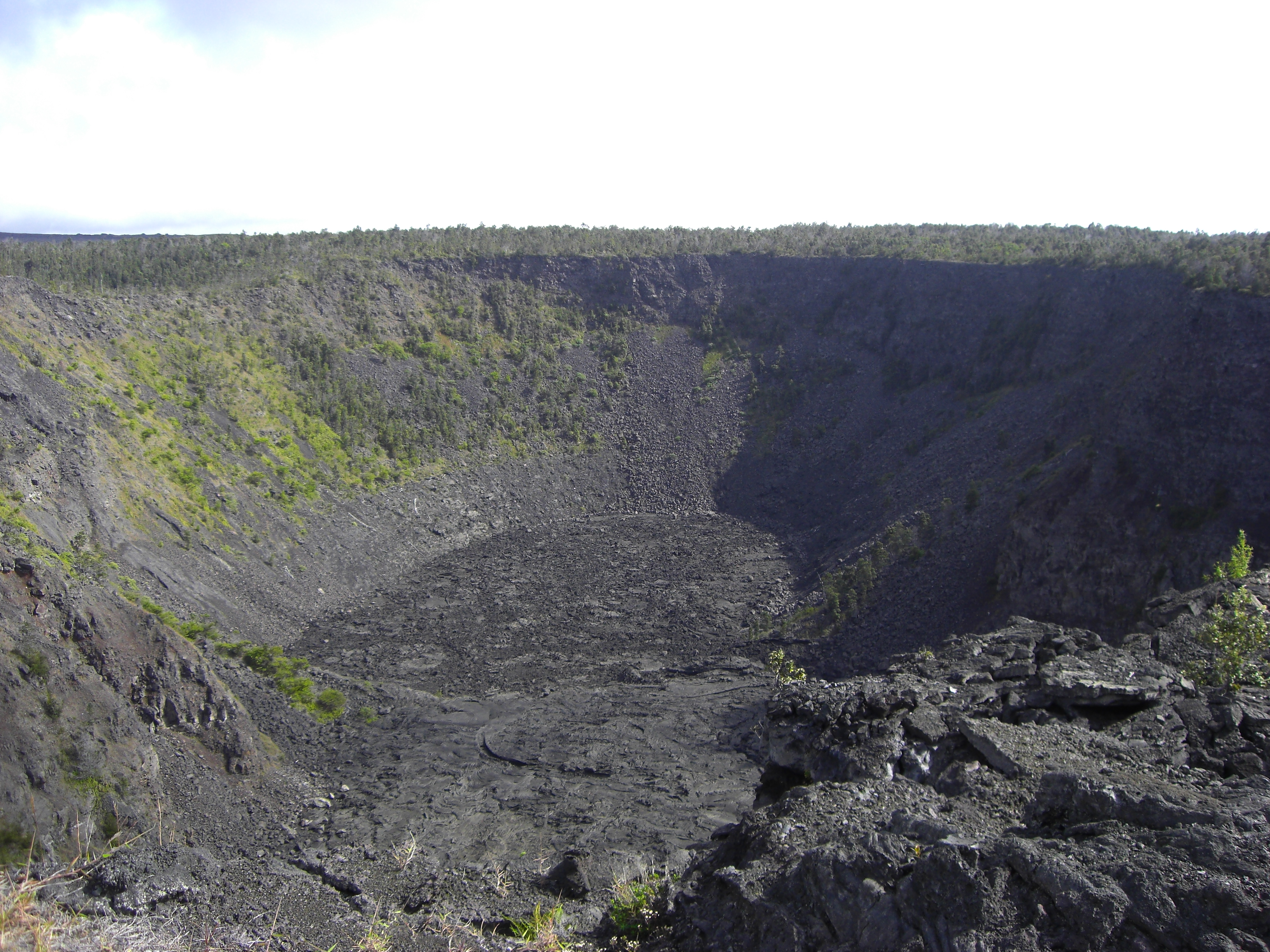
- Pauahi Crater from the overlook

Highest point
- Elevation: 2,946 ft (898 m)
- Coordinates: 19°22′6″N 155°13′21″W

Geography

Geology
- Last eruption: November 16–17, 1979

Pauahi Crater is a volcanic crater measuring 2,000 ft (610 m) long, up to some 1,300 ft (400 m) across, and 300 ft (91 m) deep in Hawaii Volcanoes National Park at 19°22′6″N 155°13′21″W. It is about 3 mi (4.8 km) from the top of the Big Island of Hawaii's Chain of Craters Road, which follows a "chain" that also includes the Hiʻiaka, Puʻu Huluhulu, Kānenuiohamo, Makaopuhi and Nāpau craters.

== Eruptive history ==
Three historic eruptions have occurred at or near Pauahi Crater. The first was in May 1973 when a fissure opened and erupted briefly on its floor. The second took place in November 1973 and lasted 31 days (November 10 — December 9), but most activity was concentrated during the event's initial 10 hours. The eruption created a set of echelon fissures extending over some 2 mi (3.2 km) from a point just west of the crater, across the crater floor, and on eastward almost to Puu Huluhulu. The third eruption occurred on November 16, 1979, and lasted only one day.
