= Chain of Craters Road =

Road in Hawaii

Coordinates: 19°24′18″N 155°15′10″W

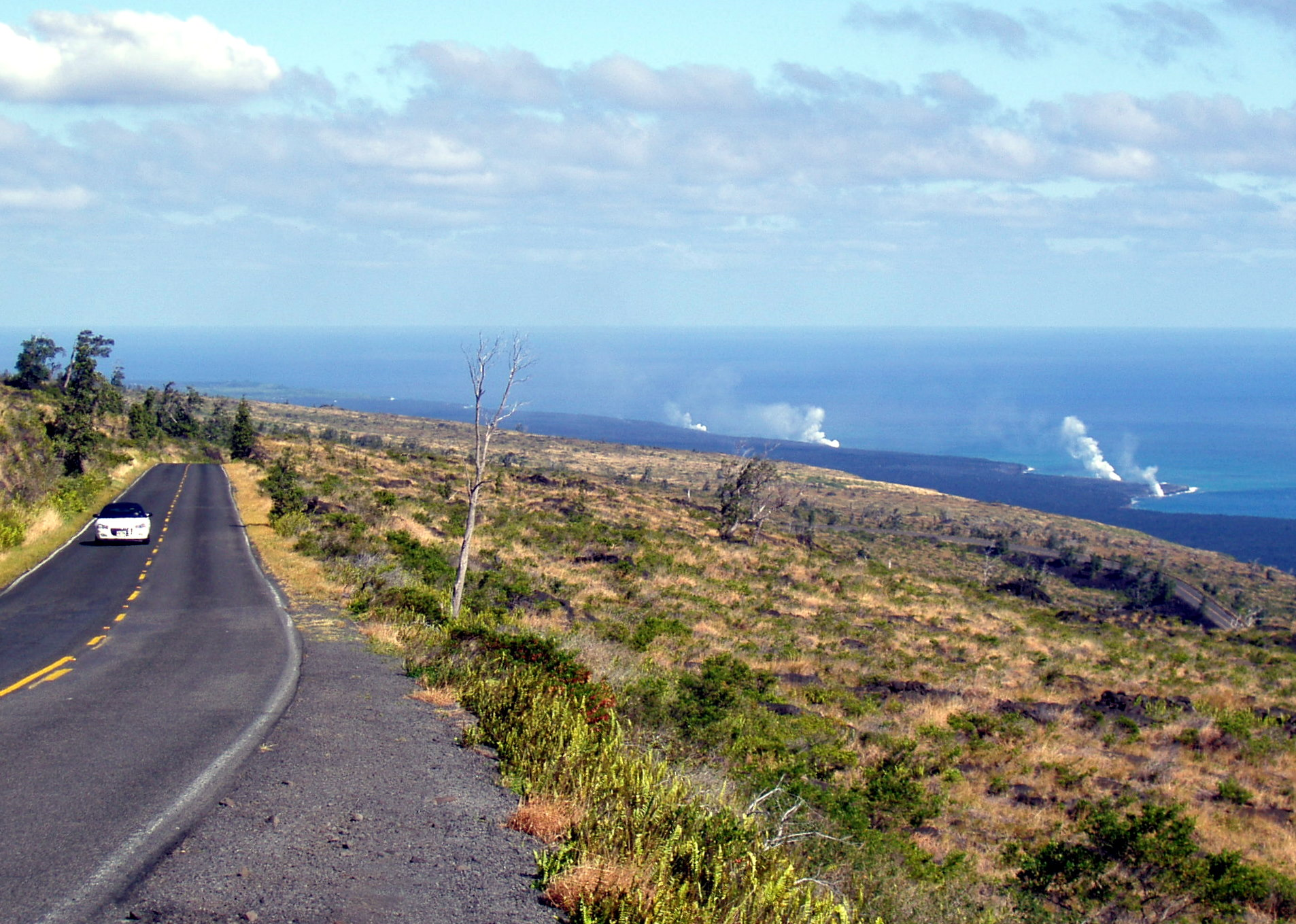
Lava from Puʻu ʻŌʻō flowed through subsurface lava tubes until it met the ocean, creating the steam plumes seen in 2007 in the distance from Chain of Craters Road.

Chain of Craters Road is a 19-mile (31 km) long winding paved road through the East Rift and coastal area of the Hawaii Volcanoes National Park on the island of Hawaii, in the state of Hawaii, United States. The original road, built in 1928, connected Crater Rim Drive to Makaopuhi Crater. The road was lengthened to reach the tiny town of Kalapana in 1959. As of 2018, the road has had parts covered by lava in 41 of the past 53 years, due to eruptions of Kīlauea volcano.

== Route description ==
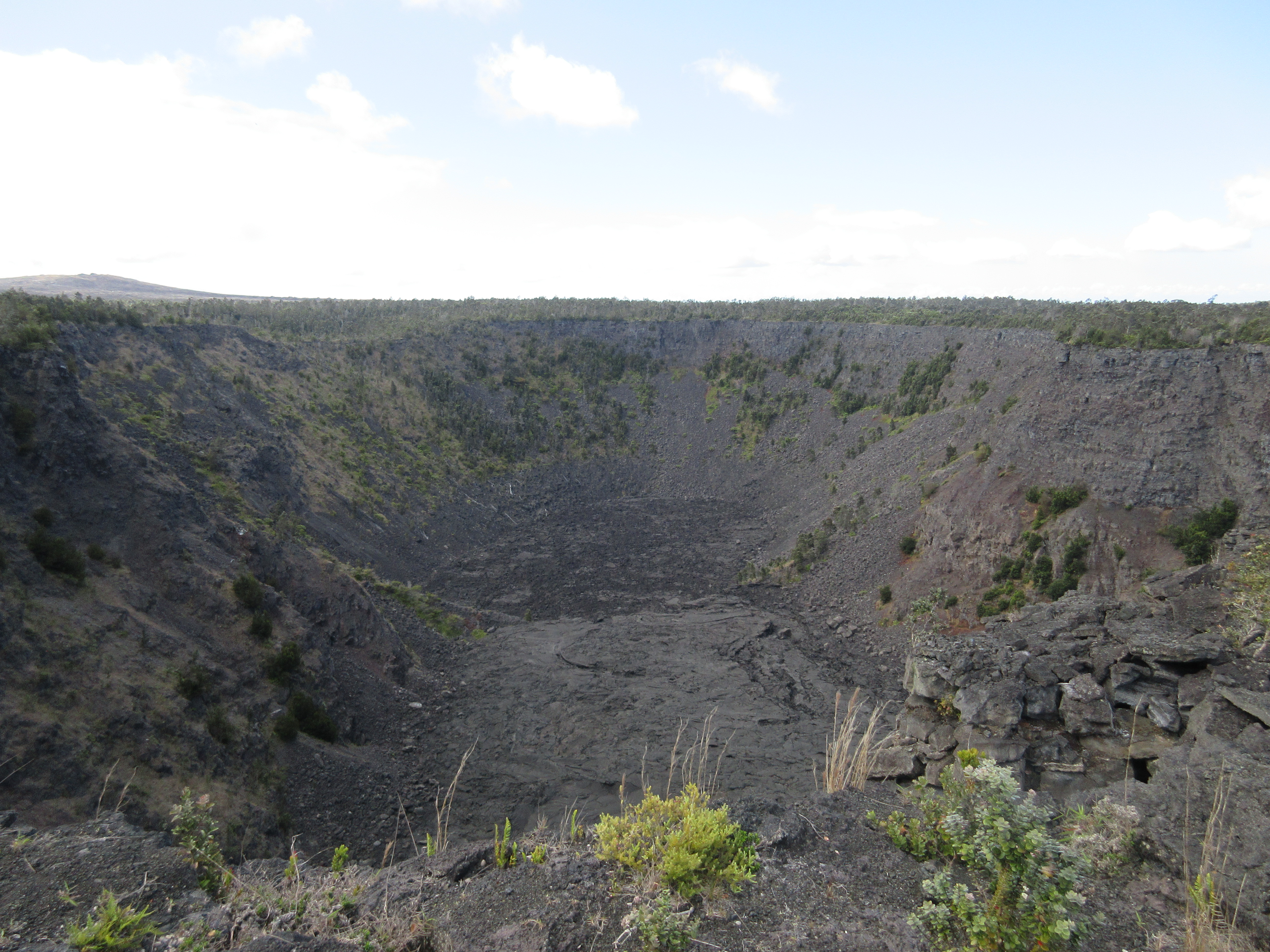
Pauahi Crater, which last erupted in 1979, is 300 feet (91 m) wide and up to 500 feet (150 m) deep.

The road has paths and road offshoots that allow access to features such as pit craters, dormant lava flows, plumes from lava tubes and geographic sites that can be accessed by trails from the road. There are also scenic views through tropical rainforests, and the coast. Next to the park's visitor center is the 10-mile (16 km) paved Crater Rim Drive around Kilauea caldera, off which a short paved road leads to a viewpoint overlooking Kīlauea, the origin of the 1995 eruption that closed the Chain of Craters Road.

The road begins at the highest part of the eastern rift zone where frequent rains created a rainforest. 3 mi (4.8 km) down the road is the vent of Kīlauea volcano. The road goes another 2 mi (3.2 km), passing the group of craters for which the road is named, and then crosses a narrow flow of pāhoehoe lava that erupted in 1974, before it reaches Lua Manu, the first pit crater. The crater formed through a sinking of the earth surface and not as a vent for lava.

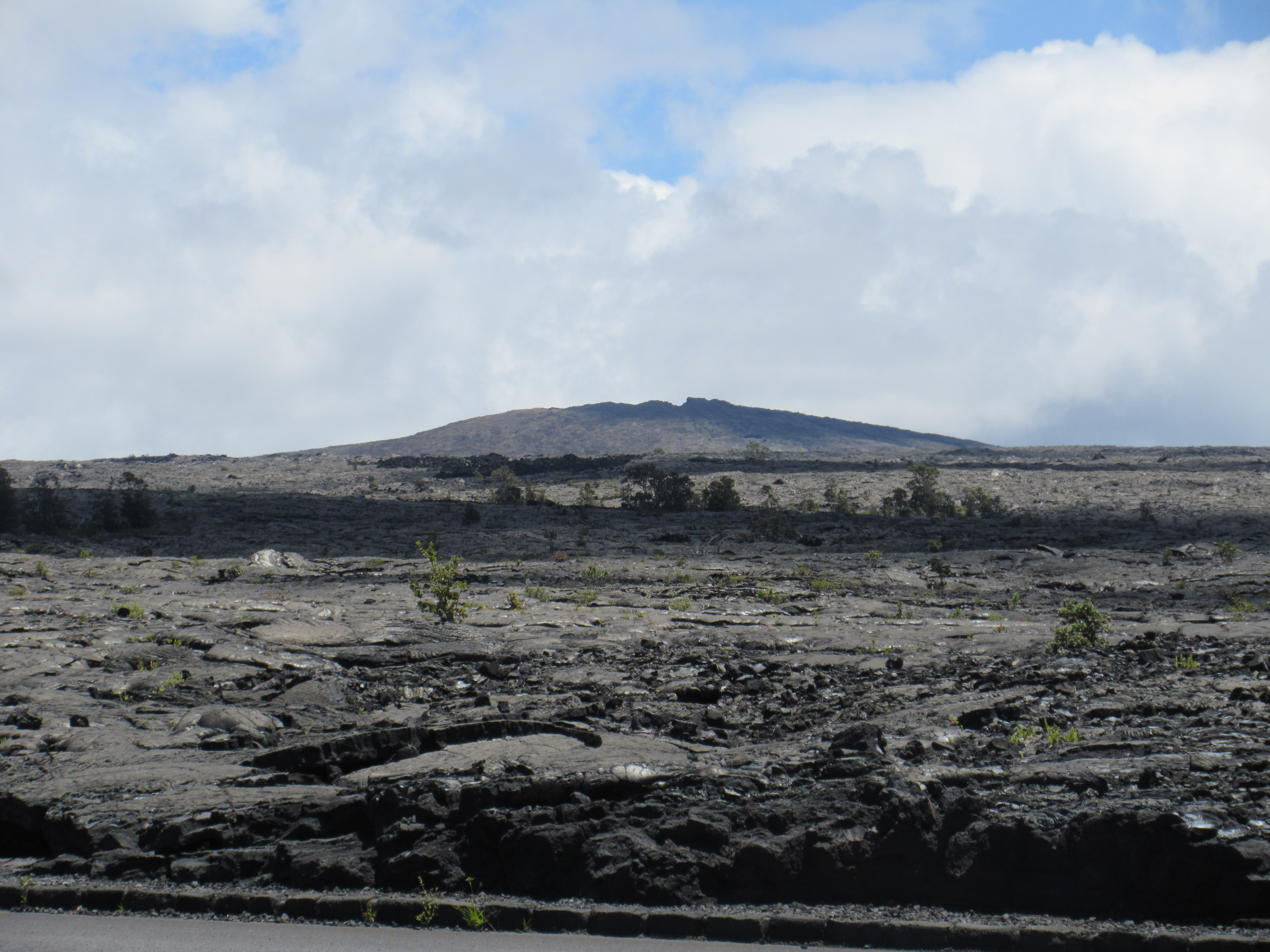
Austere environment surrounding the Mauna Ulu cinder cone.

Here lava spilled into the crater in 1974 but did not fill it. The collapsed rubble-filled Puhimau, the second pit crater, is 500 feet (150 m) deep. This crater and the next, a dirt pit crater, Koʻokoʻolau, give no indications of recent eruptions. However, Koʻokoʻolau has pumice cones on the rim that suggest it formed originally as an eruptive vent. The road runs into Hilina Pali Road, a winding eight-mile (13 km) road that dead ends. The road passes Pauahi Crater, and fresh fault scarp that have been active for more than 1000 years. The road continues through a forest, Kipuka Nene, where 1,100-year-old trees are surrounded by fresh lava.

Toward the sea the road crosses a pāhoehoe lava flow. In the early 2000s, steam from lava tubes could be seen.

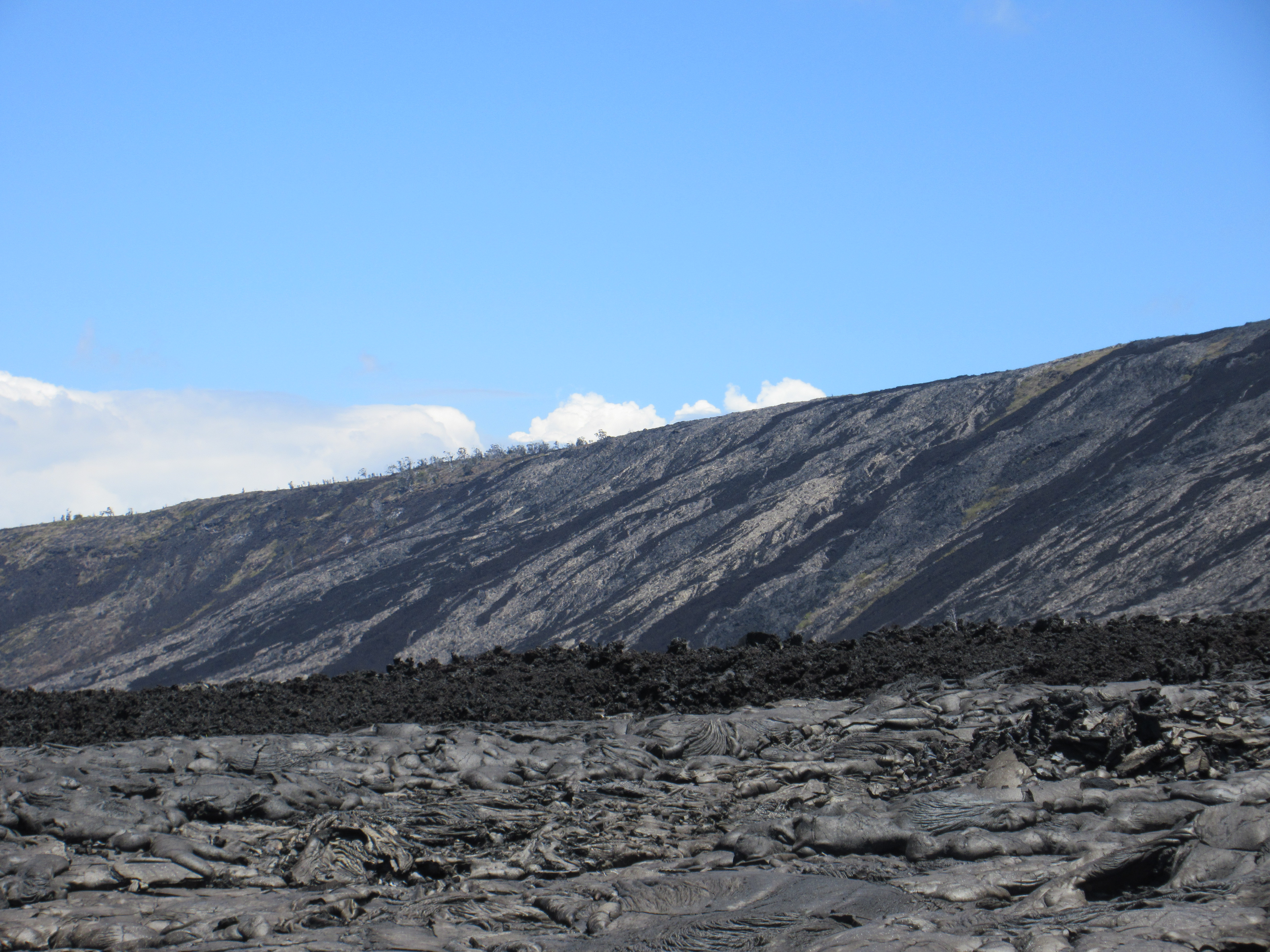
Lava continues to change the landscape. The hillside flows date from the 1969–74 Mauna Ulu eruptions. The foreground pahoehoe lava is from the 2003 flow.

Lava flows from the Kīlauea volcano eruption closed the road in 1969. In 1979, the road was reopened, but it was cut again in 1986 by a lava flow from another eruption of Kīlauea. As of 2014, Chain of Craters Road is about 19 miles (31 km) long to the former site of Holei Sea Arch where it terminates, with a further 7.5 miles (12.1 km) now buried by lava from different flows from Puʻu ʻŌʻō since 1986. In all, it descends 3,700 feet (1,100 m) between Crater Rim Drive and the south coast.

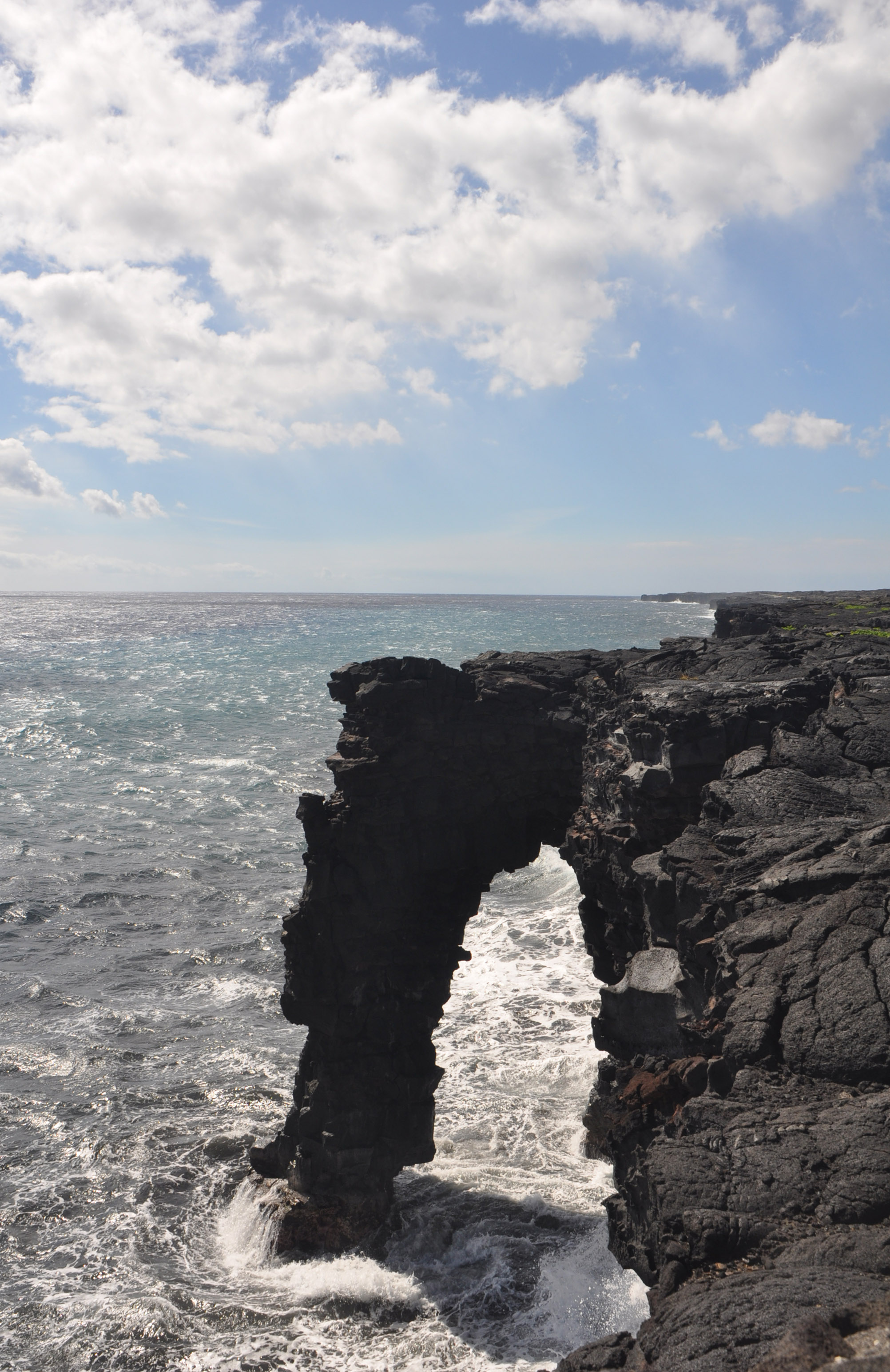
Holei Sea Arch, which stood where the road deadends

Between September and November 2014, work was carried out to reopen Chain of Craters Road, initially as a one-lane graveled surface, to serve as an emergency road for the residents of Lower Puna, who were in danger of being cut off if the June 27 flow had crossed Highway 130 at Pāhoa. The flow ultimately stalled on the outskirts of Pāhoa, however, removing the immediate threat, and the route was again buried by lava by the "61G" flow in 2016. The 2018 lower Puna eruption prompted a similar repair, but the road remains closed to non-emergency use by vehicles.

== Conditions ==
The 35-year Pu‘u ‘Ō‘ō eruption ended in 2018, but even without active lava, Chain of Craters Road is regarded as a scenic drive, but it can be hazardous under poor conditions. Because of the dangers posed by an active volcano, the US Geological Survey posts a daily conditions report. In April 2008, the area was rated as dangerous with a high alert, because of volcanic activity and sulfuric gas.

== Services ==
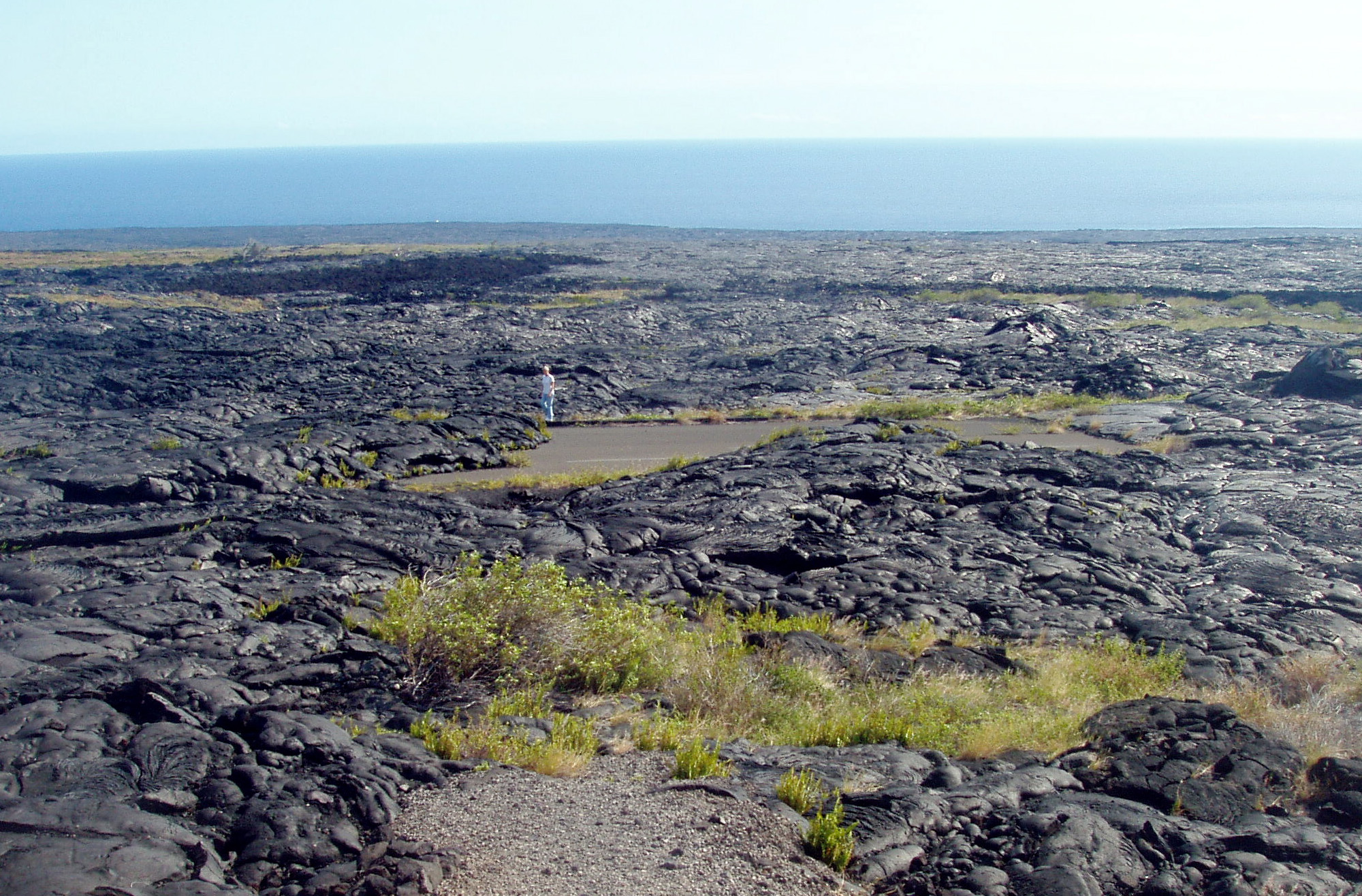
Lava has flowed across the road several times

There are no services such as shops or gas stations along the road, except a refreshment kiosk and public toilets at the bottom end of the road, at the point where further access is for emergency only, as it was blocked by lava.

== See also ==
- Hawaii hotspot
- Hawaiian eruption
- Kamoamoa
