= Puna-Kāʻu Historic District =

Historic Place in Hawaii County, Hawaii

- U.S. National Register of Historic Places
- U.S. Historic district
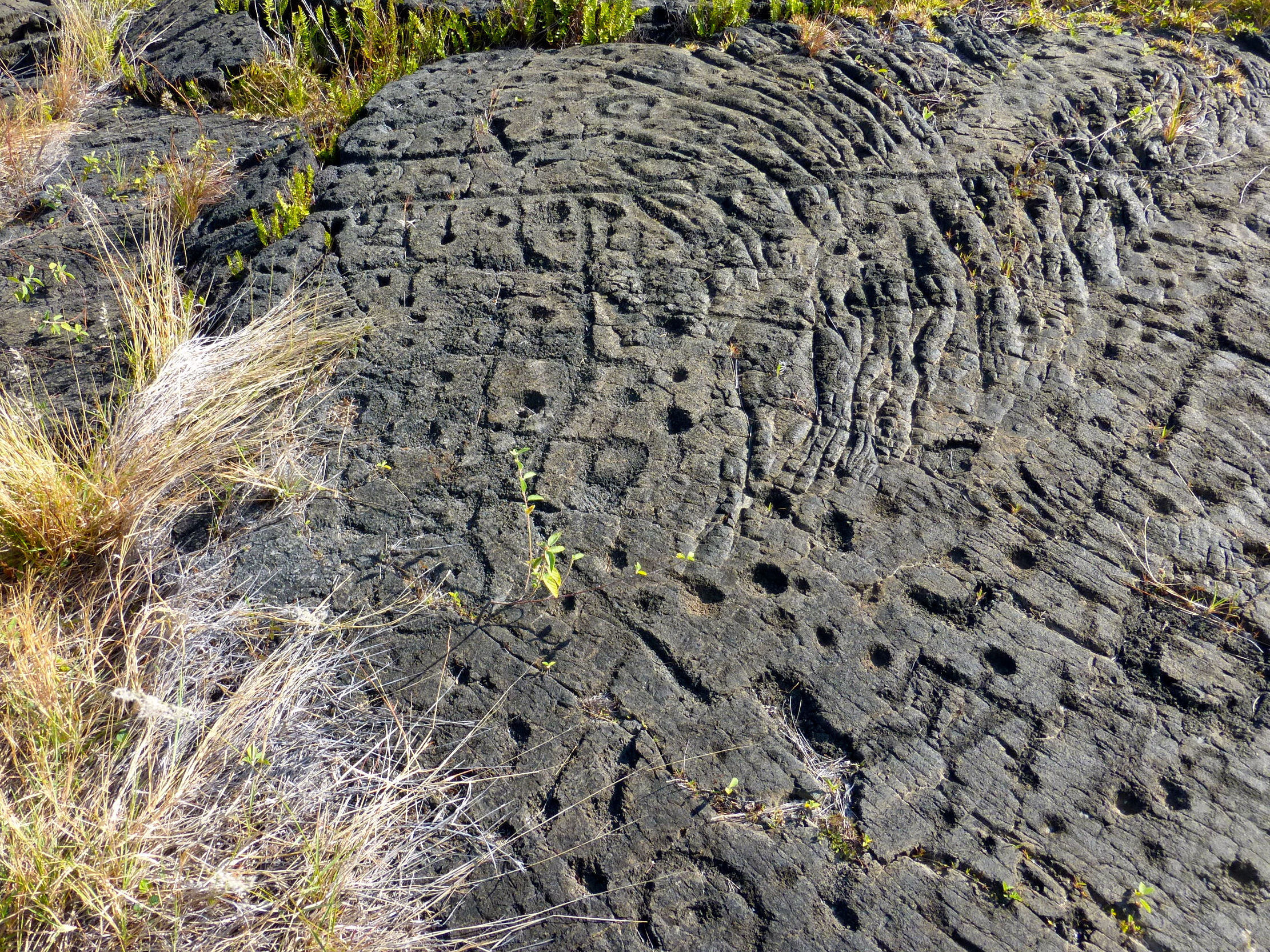

- Location within Hawaii
- Nearest city: Pahala, Hawaii
- Coordinates: 19°17′42″N 155°14′31″W
- Area: 129,655 acres (52,470 ha)
- NRHP reference No.: 74000294
- Added to NRHP: July 1, 1974

The Puna-Kāʻu Historic District is an archaeological district located on the Puna-Kāʻu coastline in Hawaii Volcanoes National Park. The district includes over 300 sites occupied by Polynesians from the 13th through 19th centuries. Eleven of the sites within the district are considered exceptionally significant to modern understanding of native Hawaiian culture and have been the focus of most archaeological research in the area. Five of these sites are villages, at Poupou-Kauka, Kailiili, Kamoamoa, Laeʻapuki, Keahou Landing; these village sites provide insight into the agricultural and social practices of the Polynesians. The Puna-Kāʻu coastal trail, another one of the significant sites, connected these villages and provided a link to communities in the mountains. The remaining sites include the Wahaulu Heiau temple, the Puuloa petroglyph site, a pulu factory, and two shelter sites used by fishermen and opihi pickers.

The district was added to the National Register of Historic Places on July 1, 1974. In addition, the Historic Hawaii Foundation created a list of historic places, including the Puna-Kāʻu Historic District, as a service to preserve the Hawaiian people's history and culture.
