= Hawaiʻi Volcanoes National Park =

National park in Hawaii, United States

- IUCN category II (national park)
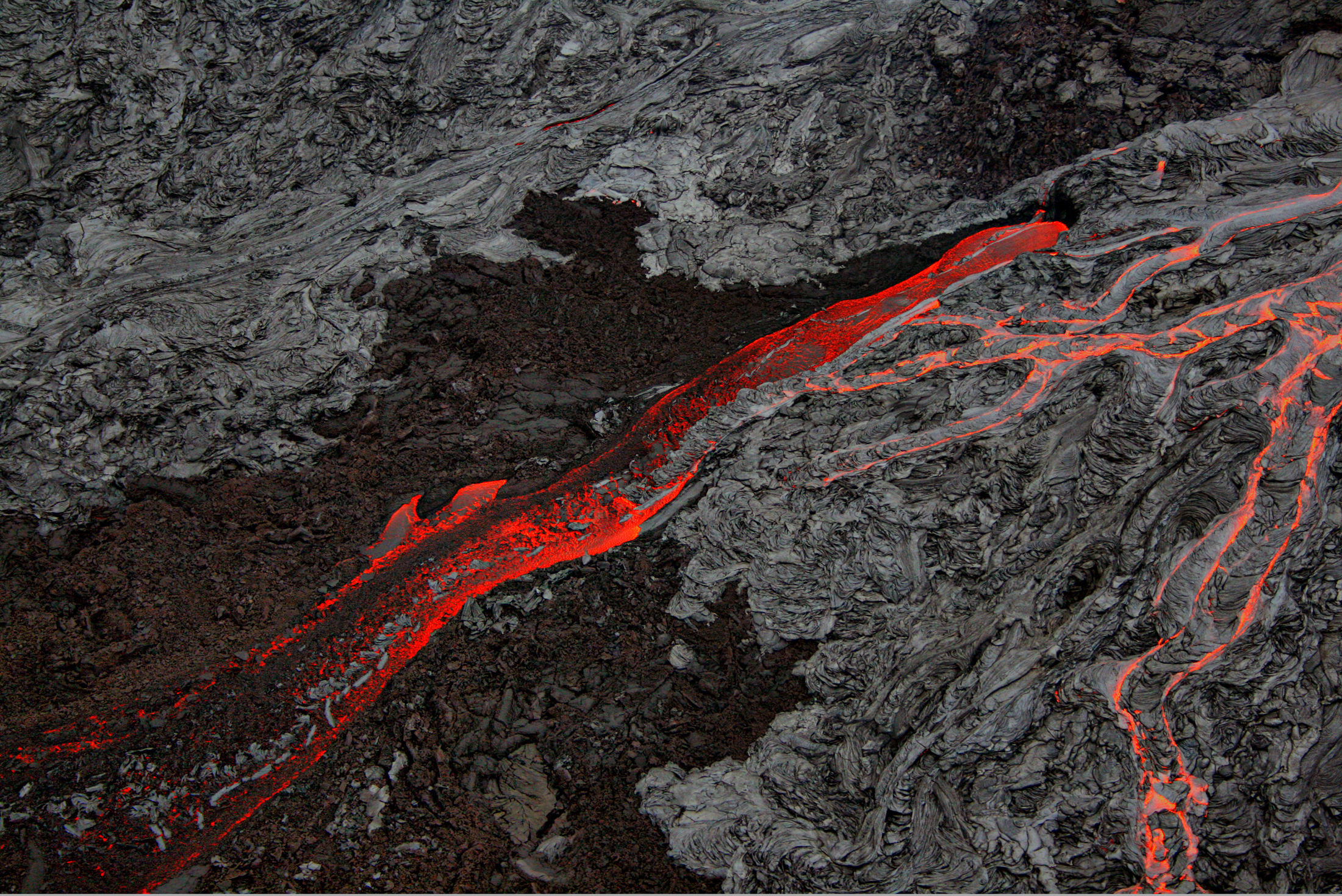
- Pāhoehoe and ʻaʻā lava flows

- Location within Hawaii
- Interactive map of Hawaiʻi Volcanoes National Park
- Location: Hawaii County, Hawaii, United States
- Nearest city: Hilo
- Coordinates: 19°23′N 155°12′W
- Area: 354,461 acres (1,434.45 km^{2})
- Established: August 1, 1916; 110 years ago
- Visitors: 1,433,593 (in 2024)
- Governing body: National Park Service
- Website: www.nps.gov/havo/index.htm

UNESCO World Heritage Site
- Criteria: Natural: viii
- Reference: 409
- Inscription: 1987 (11th Session)

Hawaiʻi Volcanoes National Park is a national park of the United States, located on the island of Hawaiʻi in the state of Hawaii. The park encompasses two active volcanoes: Kīlauea, one of the world's most active volcanoes, and Mauna Loa, the world's largest shield volcano. The park provides scientists with insight into the development of the Hawaiian Islands and access for studies of volcanism. For visitors, the park offers dramatic volcanic landscapes, glimpses of rare flora and fauna, and a view into the traditional Hawaiian culture connected to these landscapes. The indigenous people of the park, Kanaka Maoli, believed in living a life that did not take up resources. Volcanic eruptions are seen as sacred.

The park was originally established on August 1, 1916, as Hawaii National Park, which was then split into this park and Haleakalā National Park. In recognition of its outstanding natural values, Hawaiʻi Volcanoes National Park was designated as an International Biosphere Reserve in 1980 and a World Heritage Site in 1987. In 2012, the park was depicted on the 14th quarter of the America the Beautiful Quarters series.

On May 11, 2018, the park was closed to the public in the Kīlauea volcano summit area, including the visitor center and park headquarters, due to explosions and toxic ash clouds from Halemaʻumaʻu crater, as well as earthquakes and road damage. Portions of the park, including the visitor center, reopened to the public on September 22, 2018.

As of 2026, most of the park is open; however, some road segments and trails are still closed to visitors. The Jaggar Museum and buildings of Hawaiian Volcano Observatory were too damaged by the 2018 events to be used further and were torn down in 2024. Eruptive activity, ground collapses and explosions in the park ceased in early August 2018, and the lull in eruptive activity at Kīlauea continued until an eruption on December 20, 2020, at the Halemaʻumaʻu crater. Since then, the crater has been intermittently eruptive with lava fountains and flows, though the activity has not been on the scale of the 2018 events.

== Description ==
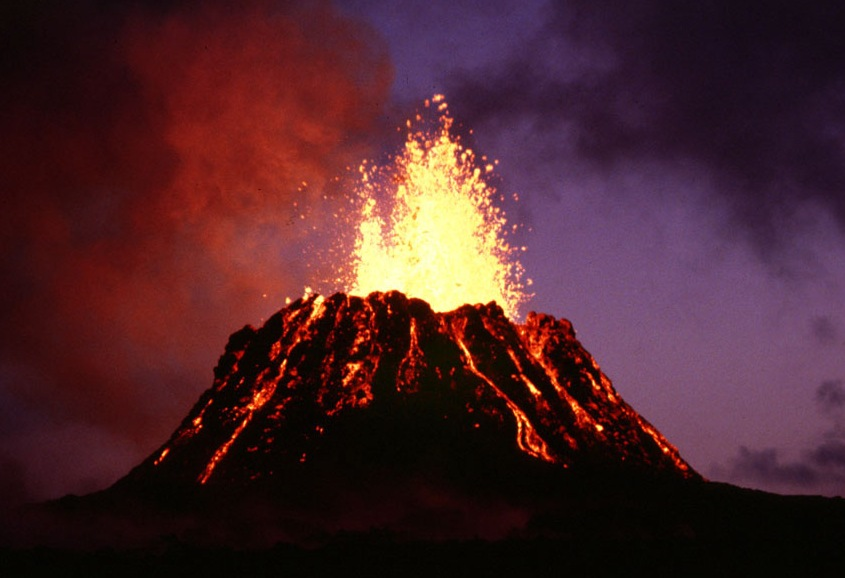
Lava erupting from the Puʻu ʻŌʻō vent in June 1983

The park includes 354,461 acres (553.85 sq mi; 1,434.45 km^{2}) of land. Around half of the park (130,790 acres (529 km^{2})) was designated the Hawaii Volcanoes Wilderness area in 1978, providing solitude for hiking and camping. Wilderness designation covers the northwestern extension of the National Park, including Mokuaweoweo, the summit of the volcano Mauna Loa. In the southwestern portion of the park, a large area of wilderness includes several miles of coastline and a small portion southeast of the visitors center. The park encompasses diverse environments from sea level to the summit of the Earth's most massive active volcano, Mauna Loa, with a height of 13,679 feet (4,169 m). Climates range from lush tropical rain forests, to the arid and barren Kaʻū Desert.

Recently eruptive sites include the main caldera of Kīlauea and a more active but remote vent called Puʻu ʻŌʻō.

=== Access ===
The main entrance to the park is from the Hawaii Belt Road. The Chain of Craters Road leads to the coast, passing several craters from historic eruptions. The road had continued to another park entrance near the town of Kalapana, but that portion is covered by a lava flow, and is only available as an emergency evacuation route. The park's Kahuku District is accessible via Kahuku Road off Highway 11 near mile marker 70.

=== Climate ===
Climate data for Hawaiʻi Volcanoes National Park Headquarters, Hawaii, 1991–2020 normals, extremes 1949–2015
Month	Jan	Feb	Mar	Apr	May	Jun	Jul	Aug	Sep	Oct	Nov	Dec	Year
Record high °F (°C)	79 (26)	82 (28)	80 (27)	81 (27)	81 (27)	83 (28)	87 (31)	84 (29)	85 (29)	81 (27)	80 (27)	81 (27)	87 (31)
Mean maximum °F (°C)	74.4 (23.6)	74.7 (23.7)	74.4 (23.6)	74.1 (23.4)	75.8 (24.3)	76.2 (24.6)	78.0 (25.6)	78.8 (26.0)	77.8 (25.4)	77.7 (25.4)	76.1 (24.5)	75.0 (23.9)	80.5 (26.9)
Mean daily maximum °F (°C)	68.3 (20.2)	68.2 (20.1)	67.5 (19.7)	68.3 (20.2)	70.5 (21.4)	71.3 (21.8)	72.7 (22.6)	73.7 (23.2)	73.2 (22.9)	72.4 (22.4)	70.3 (21.3)	68.2 (20.1)	70.4 (21.3)
Daily mean °F (°C)	58.8 (14.9)	58.7 (14.8)	59.1 (15.1)	60.1 (15.6)	61.8 (16.6)	62.8 (17.1)	64.1 (17.8)	64.8 (18.2)	64.3 (17.9)	63.7 (17.6)	62.1 (16.7)	59.9 (15.5)	61.7 (16.5)
Mean daily minimum °F (°C)	49.4 (9.7)	49.3 (9.6)	50.7 (10.4)	51.9 (11.1)	53.0 (11.7)	54.3 (12.4)	55.6 (13.1)	56.0 (13.3)	55.4 (13.0)	55.1 (12.8)	54.0 (12.2)	51.7 (10.9)	53.0 (11.7)
Mean minimum °F (°C)	42.6 (5.9)	42.2 (5.7)	44.3 (6.8)	45.9 (7.7)	47.6 (8.7)	49.5 (9.7)	50.3 (10.2)	50.7 (10.4)	50.0 (10.0)	49.5 (9.7)	47.7 (8.7)	44.2 (6.8)	40.6 (4.8)
Record low °F (°C)	34 (1)	35 (2)	38 (3)	40 (4)	42 (6)	42 (6)	45 (7)	41 (5)	45 (7)	45 (7)	41 (5)	35 (2)	34 (1)
Average precipitation inches (mm)	8.77 (223)	8.15 (207)	10.27 (261)	9.16 (233)	6.46 (164)	5.10 (130)	6.29 (160)	5.91 (150)	5.98 (152)	8.19 (208)	10.59 (269)	11.37 (289)	96.24 (2,444)
Average precipitation days (≥ 0.01 in)	21.9	20.4	25.3	26.3	25.1	25.4	25.8	25.3	23.9	24.5	26.3	25.0	295.2
Source 1: NOAA
Source 2: WRCC (mean maxima/minima 1981–2010)

== History ==
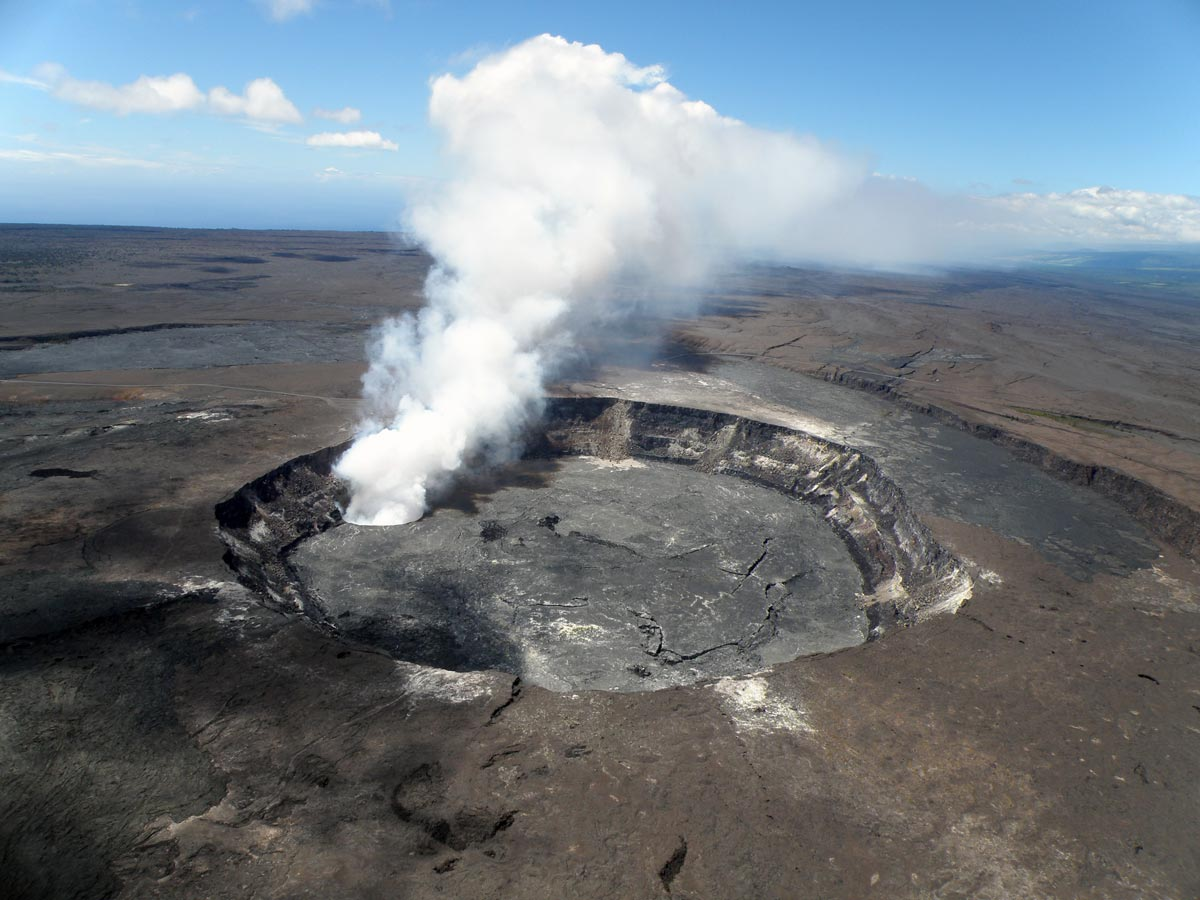
Aerial view of Halemaʻumaʻu, September 2009

Kīlauea and its Halemaʻumaʻu caldera were traditionally considered the sacred home of the volcano goddess Pele, and Hawaiians visited the crater to offer gifts to the goddess. The name "Kīlauea" means "much spreading", which is a reference to how often it erupts. On the other hand, Mauna Loa means "long mountain", which references its great height.

In 1790, a party of warriors, along with women and children who were in the area, were caught in an unusually violent eruption. Many were killed and others left footprints in the lava that are still visible.

The first western visitors to the site, English missionary William Ellis and American Asa Thurston, went to Kīlauea in 1823. Ellis wrote of his reaction to the first sight of the erupting volcano:

A spectacle, sublime and even appalling, presented itself before us. 'We stopped and trembled.' Astonishment and awe for some moments rendered us mute, and, like statues, we stood fixed to the spot, with our eyes riveted on the abyss below.

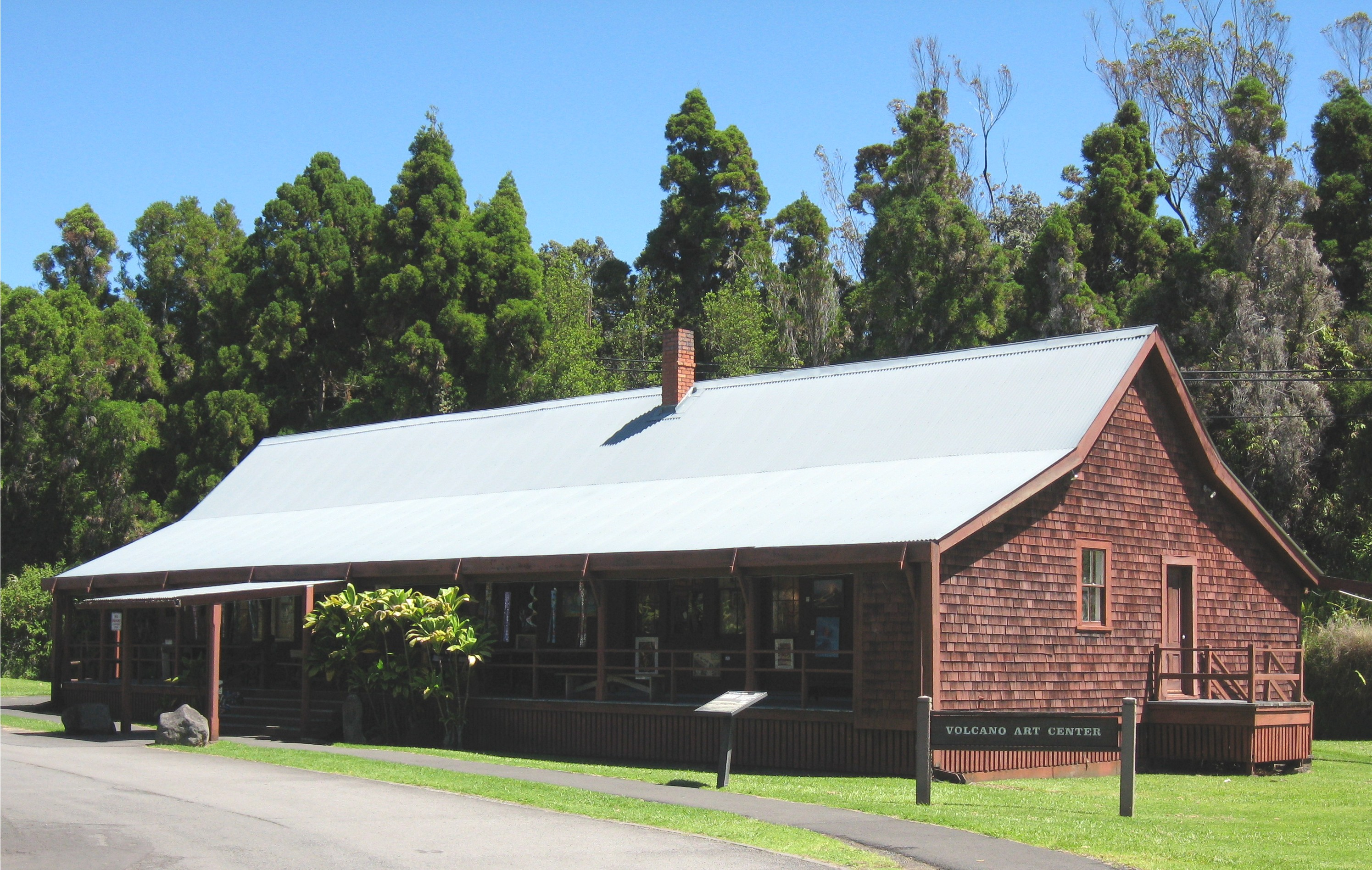
The Volcano Art Center was the Volcano House Hotel from 1877 to 1921.

The volcano became a tourist attraction in the 1840s, and local businessmen such as Benjamin Pitman and George Lycurgus ran a series of hotels at the rim. Volcano House is the only hotel or restaurant located within the borders of the national park.

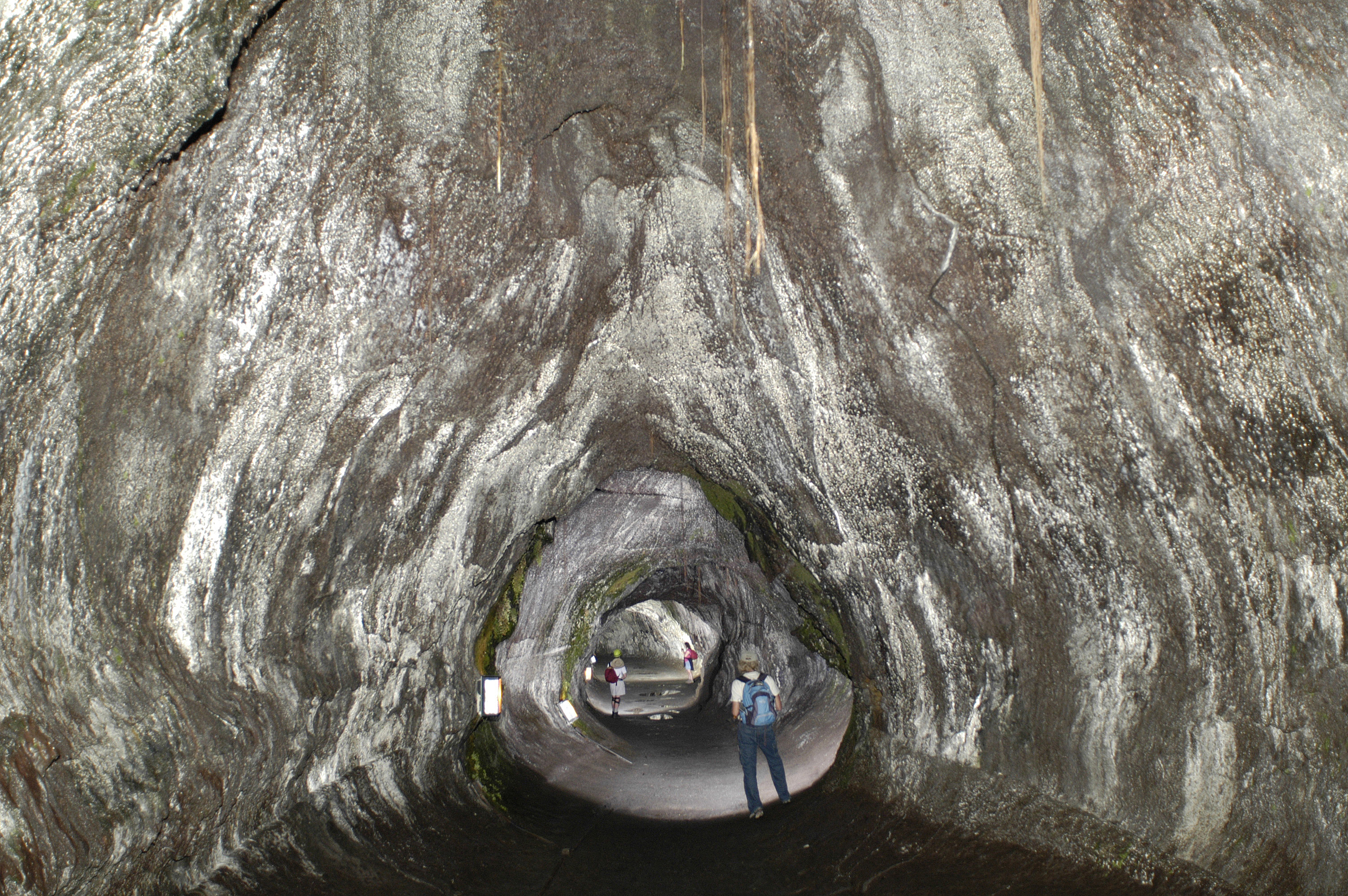
Thurston lava tube in Hawaiʻi Volcanoes National Park

Lorrin A. Thurston, grandson of the American missionary Asa Thurston, was one of the driving forces behind the establishment of the park after investing in the hotel from 1891 to 1904. William R. Castle first proposed the idea in 1903. Thurston, who then owned The Honolulu Advertiser newspaper, printed editorials in favor of the park idea. In 1907, the territory of Hawaii paid for fifty members of Congress and their wives to visit Haleakalā and Kīlauea, including a dinner cooked over lava steam vents. In 1908, Thurston entertained Secretary of the Interior James Rudolph Garfield, and another congressional delegation the following year. Governor Walter F. Frear proposed a draft bill in 1911 to create Kilauea National Park for $50,000. Thurston and local landowner William Herbert Shipman proposed boundaries, but ran into some opposition from ranchers. Thurston printed endorsements from John Muir, Henry Cabot Lodge, and former President Theodore Roosevelt. After several attempts, the legislation introduced by delegate Jonah Kūhiō Kalanianaʻole finally passed to create the park. House Resolution 9525 was signed by Woodrow Wilson on August 1, 1916.

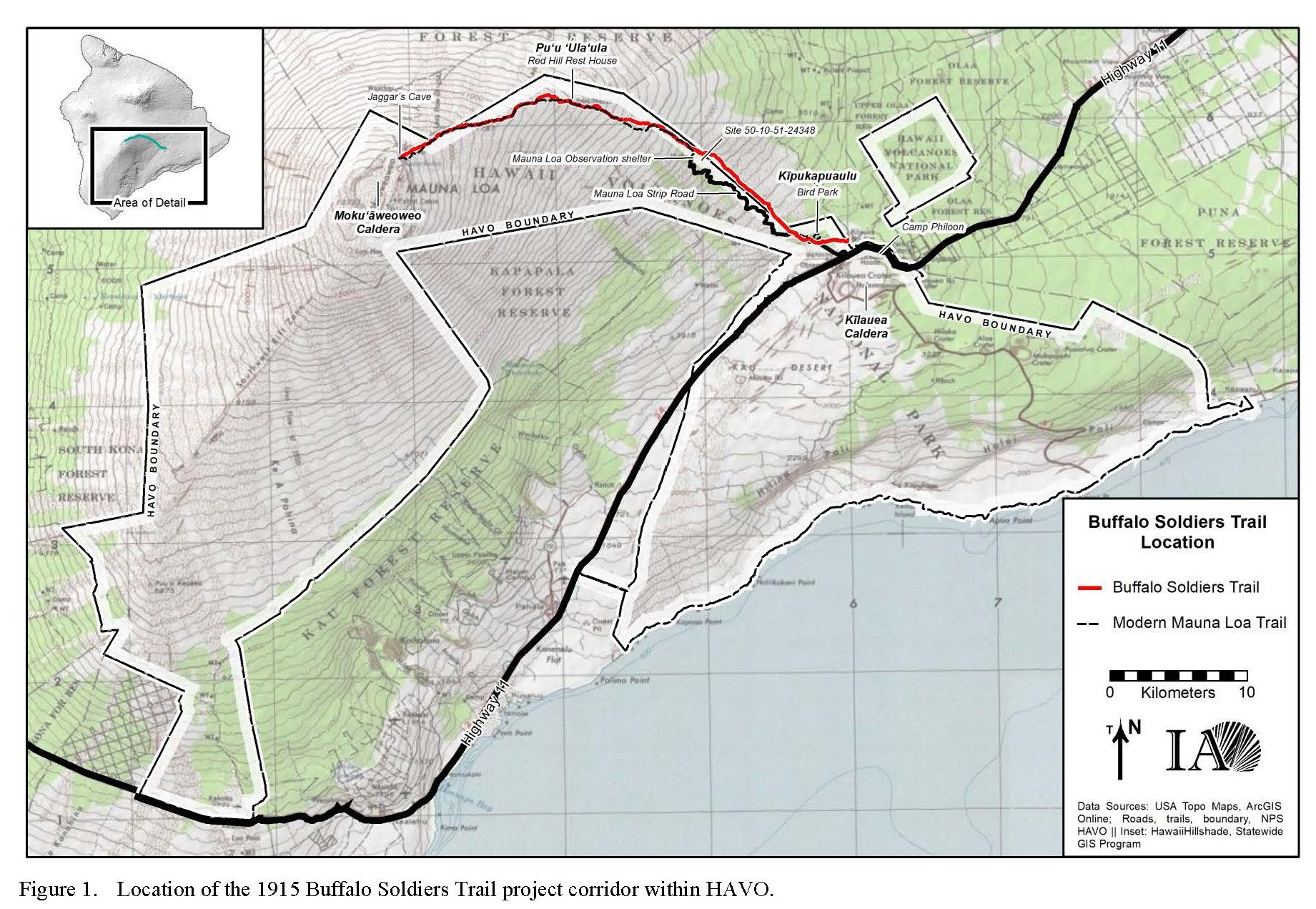
The foundation of the Mauna Loa trail (in red) by the Buffalo Soldiers

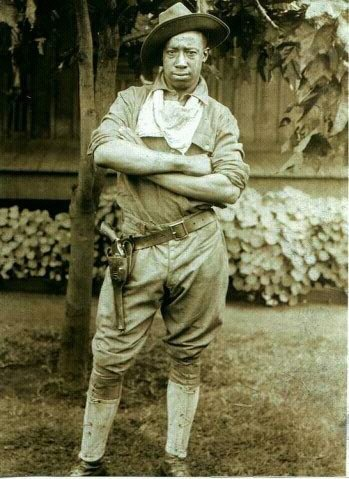
Buffalo Soldier Linold Chappell

The Buffalo Soldiers of the 25th Infantry Regiment are credited with trailblazing and building infrastructure within the Hawaiʻi Volcanoes National Park, including the Hawaiian Volcano Observatory, the Kilauea Military Camp, and the Mauna Loa trail. From 1915 to 1917, in three years, six companies of this infantry travelled to Kīlauea from Schofield Barracks to explore the area and create trails out of crushed lava mixed with soil. They created a 30 mile trail between Kīlauea and Mauna Loa. Through their hard manual labor with gunny sacks and 12-pound hammers in the harsh conditions of cold rainy weather and unexplored terrain with flowing lava, they established the foundation for the Hawaiʻi Volcanoes National Park. The park later formally opened in 1921.

Hawaiʻi National Park became the eleventh national park in the United States, and the first in a territory.

As stated in the foundation document:

The purpose of Hawai'i Volcanoes National Park is to protect, study, and provide access to Kīlauea and Mauna Loa, two of the world's most active volcanoes, and perpetuate endemic Hawaiian ecosystems and the traditional Hawaiian culture connected to these landscapes.

Within a few weeks, the National Park Service Organic Act created the National Park Service to run the system. The park was officially renamed Hawaiʻi Volcanoes National Park after being split from Haleakalā National Park on September 22, 1961.

An easily accessible lava tube was named for the Thurston family. An undeveloped stretch of the Thurston Lava Tube extends an additional 1,100 ft (340 m) beyond the developed area and dead-ends into the hillside, but it is closed to the general public.

=== Painting of Pele ===
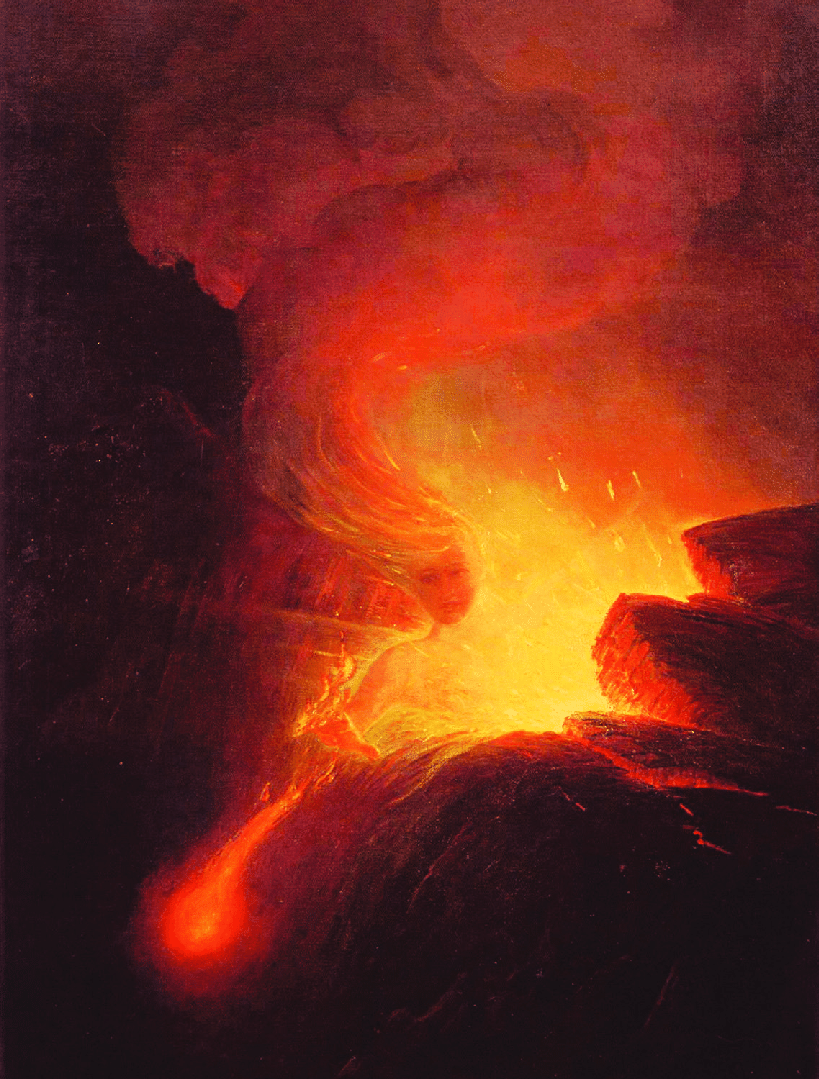
D. Howard Hitchcock's 1929 painting of Pele

Arthur Johnsen's Pele

About 1929, D. Howard Hitchcock made an oil painting of Pele, the Hawaiian goddess of fire, lightning, wind, and volcanoes. In 1966, the artist's son, Harvey, donated the painting to the Hawaiʻi Volcanoes National Park, where it was displayed in the visitor center from 1966 to 2005. The painting was criticized for portraying the Hawaiian goddess as a Caucasian.

In 2003, the Volcano Art Center announced a competition for a "more modern and culturally authentic rendering" of the goddess. An anonymous judging panel of Native Hawaiian elders selected a painting by Arthur Johnsen of Puna, Hawaii from 140 entries. In Johnsen's painting, the goddess has distinctly Polynesian features. She is holding a digging stick (ʻōʻō) in her left hand and the egg that gave birth to her younger sister Hiʻiaka in her right hand. In 2005, the Hitchcock was replaced with Johnsen's painting.

=== Recent events ===
On March 19, 2008, there was a small explosion in Halemaʻumaʻu, the first explosive event since 1924 and the first eruption in the Kīlauea caldera since September 1982. Debris from the explosion was scattered over an area of 74 acres (30 ha). A small amount of ash was also reported at a nearby community. The explosion covered part of Crater Rim Drive and damaged Halemaʻumaʻu Overlook. The explosion did not release any lava, which suggests to scientists that it was driven by hydrothermal or gas sources.

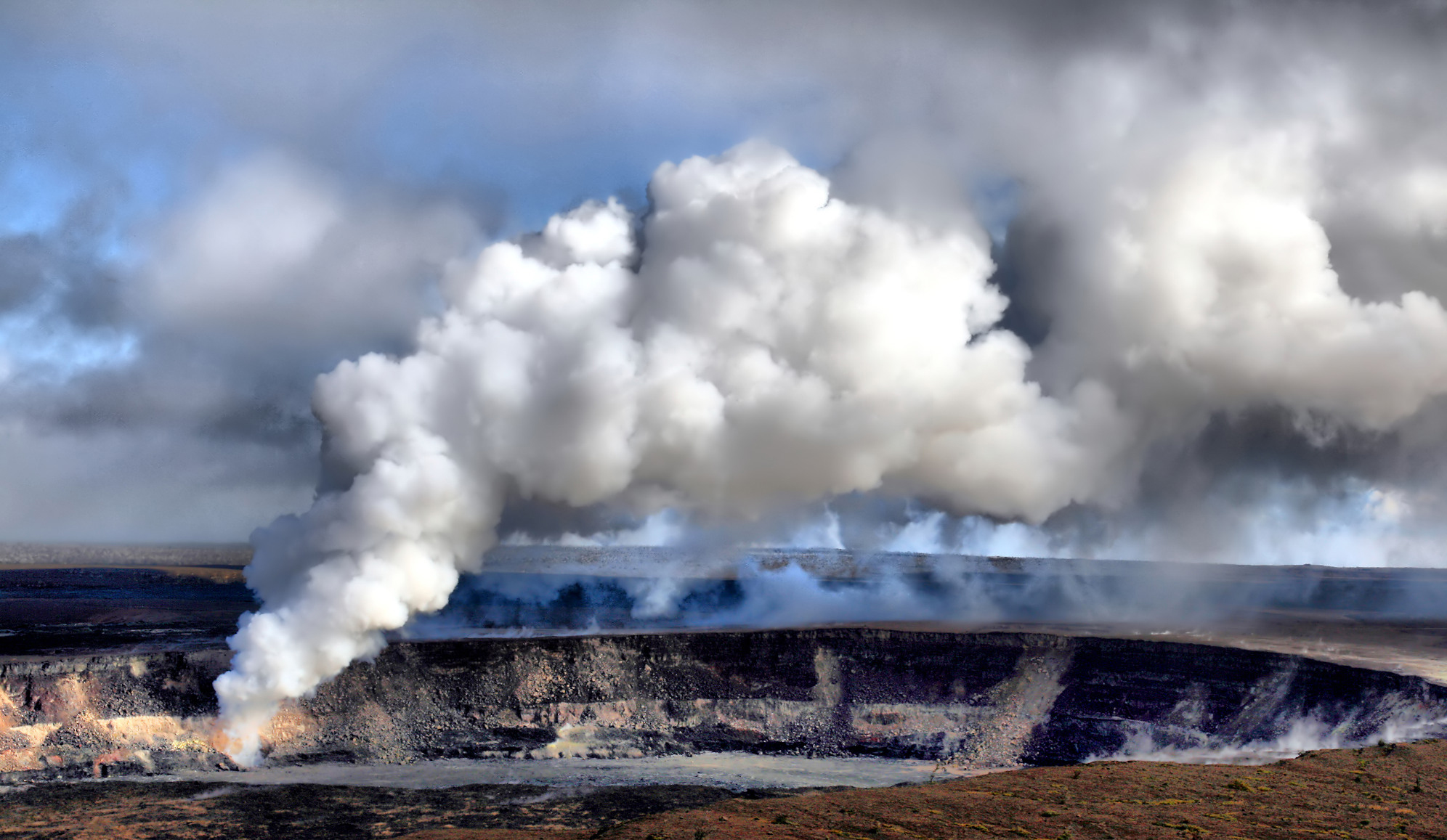
Sulfur dioxide emissions from the Halemaʻumaʻu vent, April 2008

This explosion event followed the opening of a major sulfur dioxide gas vent, greatly increasing levels emitted from Halemaʻumaʻu. The dangerous increase of sulfur dioxide gas prompted closures of Crater Rim Drive between the Jaggar Museum south/southeast to Chain of Craters Road, Crater Rim Trail from Kīlauea Military Camp south/southeast to Chain of Craters Road, and all trails leading to Halemaʻumaʻu, including those from Byron Ledge, ʻIliahi (Sandalwood) Trail, and Kaʻū Desert Trail.

In mid-May 2018, the Kīlauea District of the park was closed due to explosive eruptions at Halemaʻumaʻu, though the Kahuku District remained open. The Kīlauea District, including the visitor center, reopened to the public on September 22, 2018. Eruptive activity, ground collapses and explosions in the park had ceased in early August. At the summit, seismicity and deformation are negligible. Sulfur dioxide emission rates at both the summit and the Lower East Rift Zone are drastically reduced; the combined rate is lower than at any time since late 2007. Earthquake and deformation data show no net accumulation, withdrawal, or significant movement of subsurface magma or pressurization as would be expected if the system was building toward a resumption of activity.

Halemaʻumaʻu crater eruption in 2023

A small water pond appeared in Halemaʻumaʻu in the summer of 2019. The pond deepened and enlarged into a small lake since it was first observed, measuring 160 feet (49 m) deep as of December 1, 2020. An eruption in the crater that began on December 20, 2020, boiled away the water lake completely and began to partially refill the crater with lava.

In 2022, the Mauna Loa volcano erupted, after 40 years of inactivity. As of 2026, most of the park is open, although some road segments and trails remain closed and the Jaggar Museum of the Hawaiian Volcano Observatory was torn down due to the damage in 2018. The Thurston Lava Tube (Nāhuku) was reopened to the public on February 21, 2020. Several large rockfalls were cleared and sensors were installed to monitor new cracks, along with improvements to water drainage and parking. The rockfalls and cracks had been caused by some of the 60,000 earthquakes recorded during the Kīlauea eruption. Kīlauea has ongoing eruption activity.

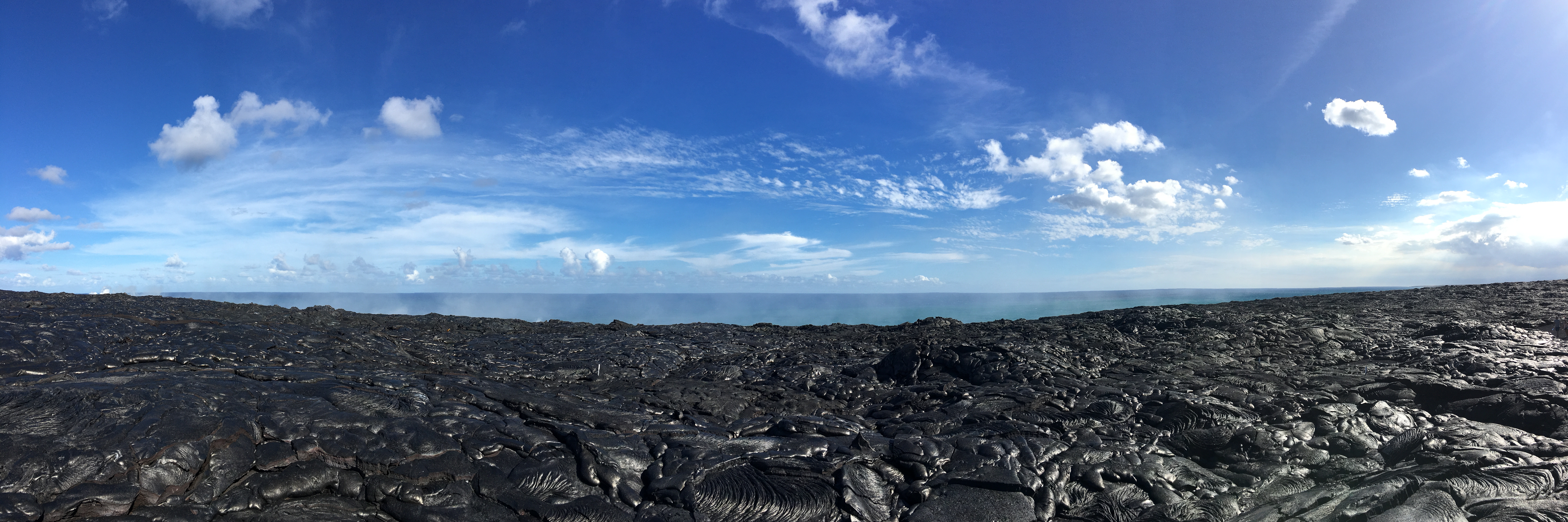
Panoramic view of the lava at the end of the Chain of Craters Road

=== Park expansion ===
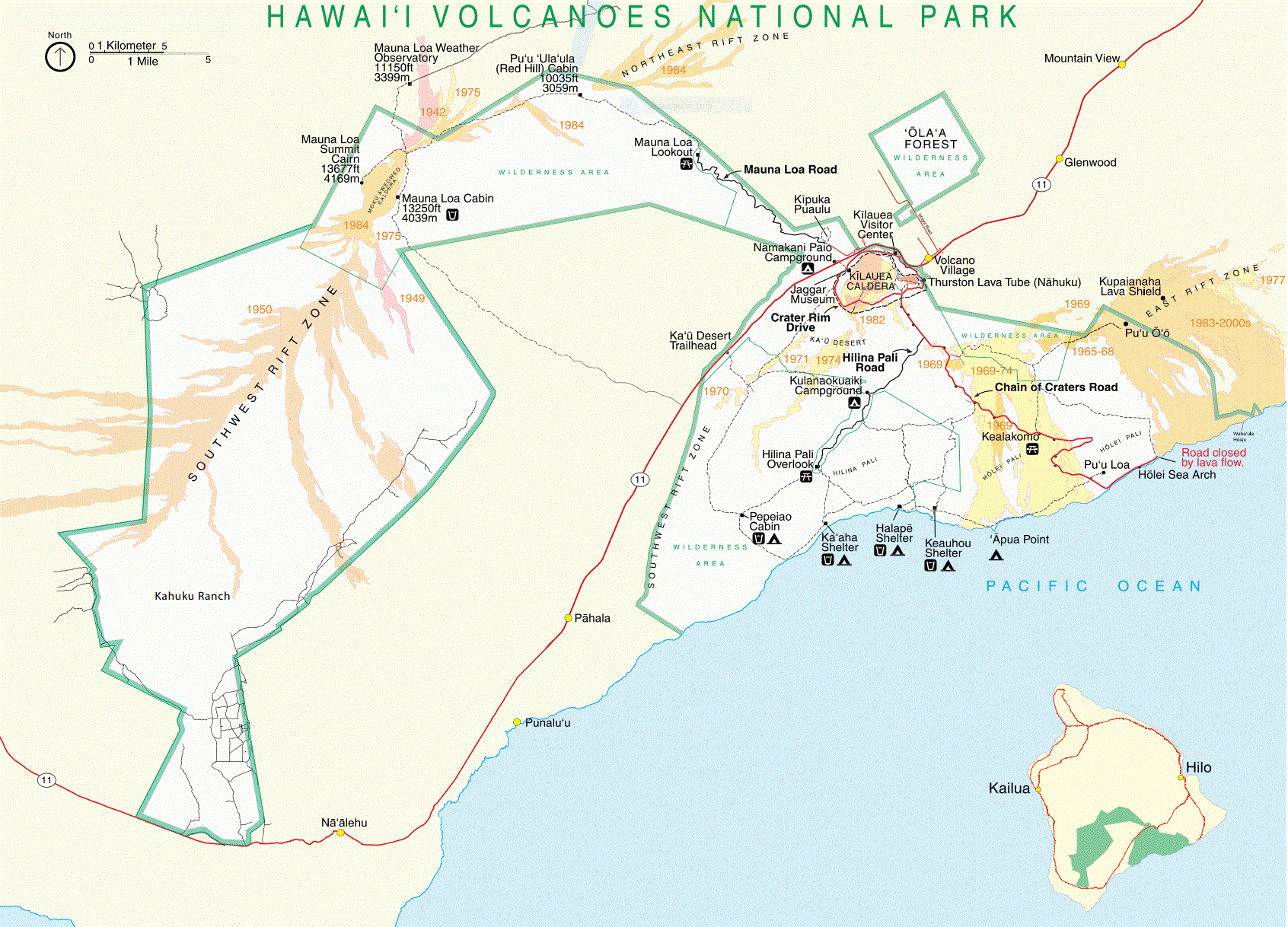
Park map including the Kahuku District on left (click to enlarge)

In 2003, an additional 115,788 acres (468.58 km^{2}) of the Kahuku Ranch were added to the park, the largest land acquisition in Hawaii's history. Named the Kahuku District, the park was enlarged by 56% with the newly acquired land, which is west of the town of Waiʻōhinu and east of Ocean View. The land was purchased for $21.9 million from the estate of Samuel Mills Damon, with financing from The Nature Conservancy.

In August 2018, the National Park Service purchased nearly 2,000 acres (810 ha) of private land adjacent to the park due to the geological features to be studied and preserved. Trails, rock walls, and archaeological sites from as old as the 12th century exist near the Great Crack. The Great Crack is an eight-mile-long (13,000 m), 60-foot-wide (18 m) and 60-foot-deep (18 m) fissure in the island, in the district of Kaʻū. According to the United States Geological Survey (USGS), the Great Crack is the result of crustal dilation from magmatic intrusions into the southwest rift zone of Kīlauea. While neither the earthquake of 1868 nor that of 1975 caused a measurable change in the Great Crack, lava welled out of its lower 6 miles (10 km) in 1823.

The park expanded in 2022 when The Trust for Public Land transferred 16,451 acres (6,657 ha) including Pohue Bay and surrounding land to the National Park Service. Pōhue Bay is home to numerous well-preserved and significant Hawaiian cultural sites, including the largest recorded abrader quarry in Hawaiʻi, lava tubes, burial site, mauka-makai (mountain to sea) trails, fishing shrines, remains of once-thriving coastal villages, and petroglyphs. A well-preserved portion of the Ala Kahakai National Historic Trail or Ala Loa, an ancient coastal trail system, hugs the coastline.

The Pōhue coastline is critical habitat for federally listed endangered Hawaiian species, including the Hawaiian hawksbill turtle (honu'ea) and Hawaiian monk seal. Rare endemic opae'ula (Hawaiian red shrimp) live in the area's anchialine ponds, and the bay is often frequented by native and migratory birds, including ʻiwa (great frigatebird), koaʻe kea (white tailed tropic bird), kōlea (Pacific golden plover), 'ulili (wandering tattler) and ʻaukuʻu (black-crowned night heron).

== Native Hawaiian culture ==
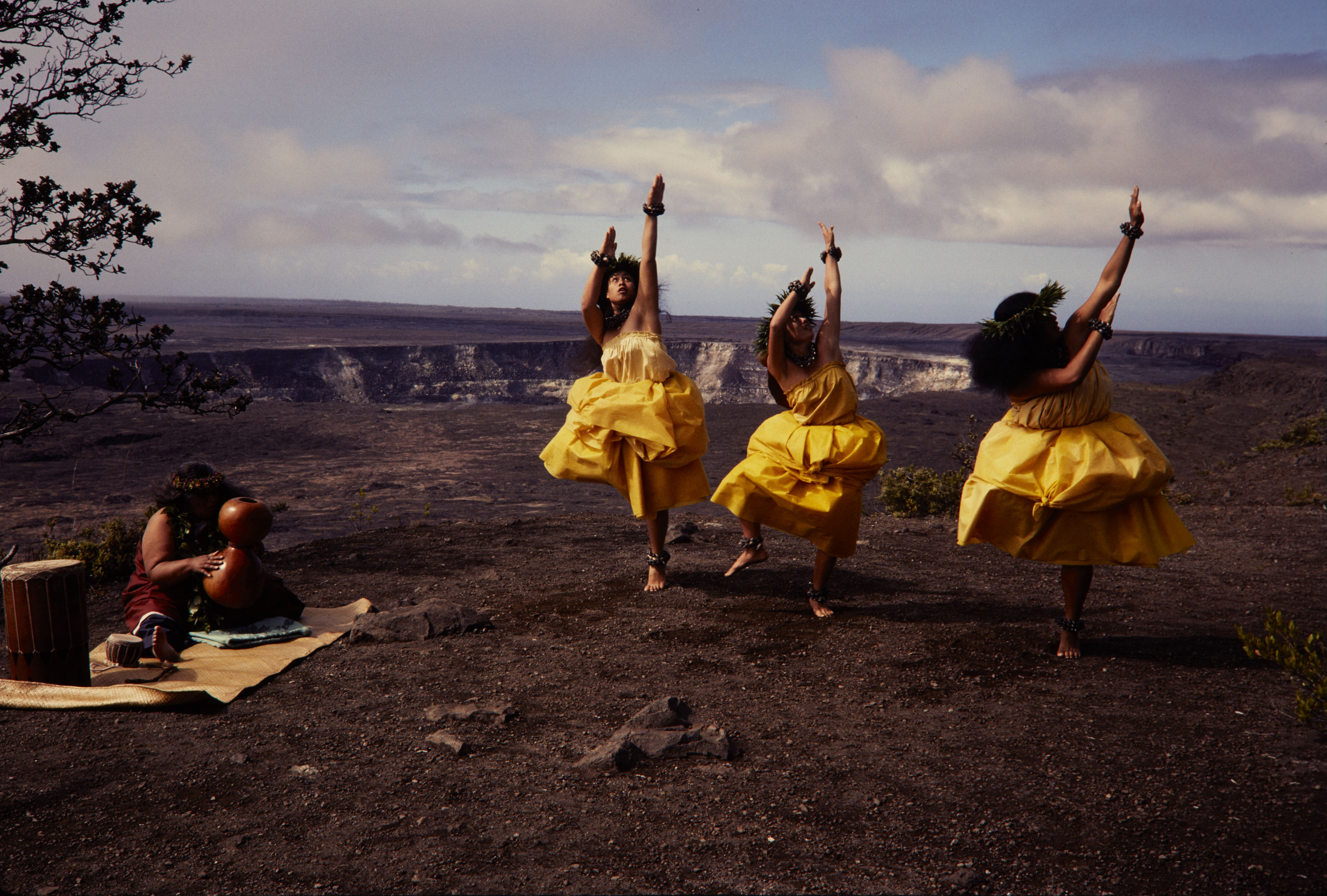
Native Hawaiian performance playing an ipu heke ʻole while adorning lei lāʻī at the Hawaiʻi Volcanoes National Park

The Hawaiʻi Volcanoes National Park aims to preserve Native Hawaiian culture by revitalizing Hawaiian traditions and hiring interpretive rangers. Rangers are an integral part of maintaining the park's historical traditions by both learning and then sharing ceremonial processes, history and language, and how to make traditional Hawaiian items. These items include the kākoʻi, a tool used for chopping down trees and hollowing out trunks to make canoes; kiʻi, wooden statues of gods; poi, cooked taro root; lei lāʻī, adornments made of ti leaves often worn in hula performances; and ipu heke ʻole, gourd drums used in hula performances.

The indigenous people known as Kanaka Maoli believe in living sustainably. Because they believe that nature is sacred, they live by "pono", which is the way of life in not taking what does not belong to you, such as lava rocks. When Kīlauea erupts, the Kanaka Maoli believe that this is a demonstration of sacredness and that the Earth is being reborn.

== Visitor center and museums ==
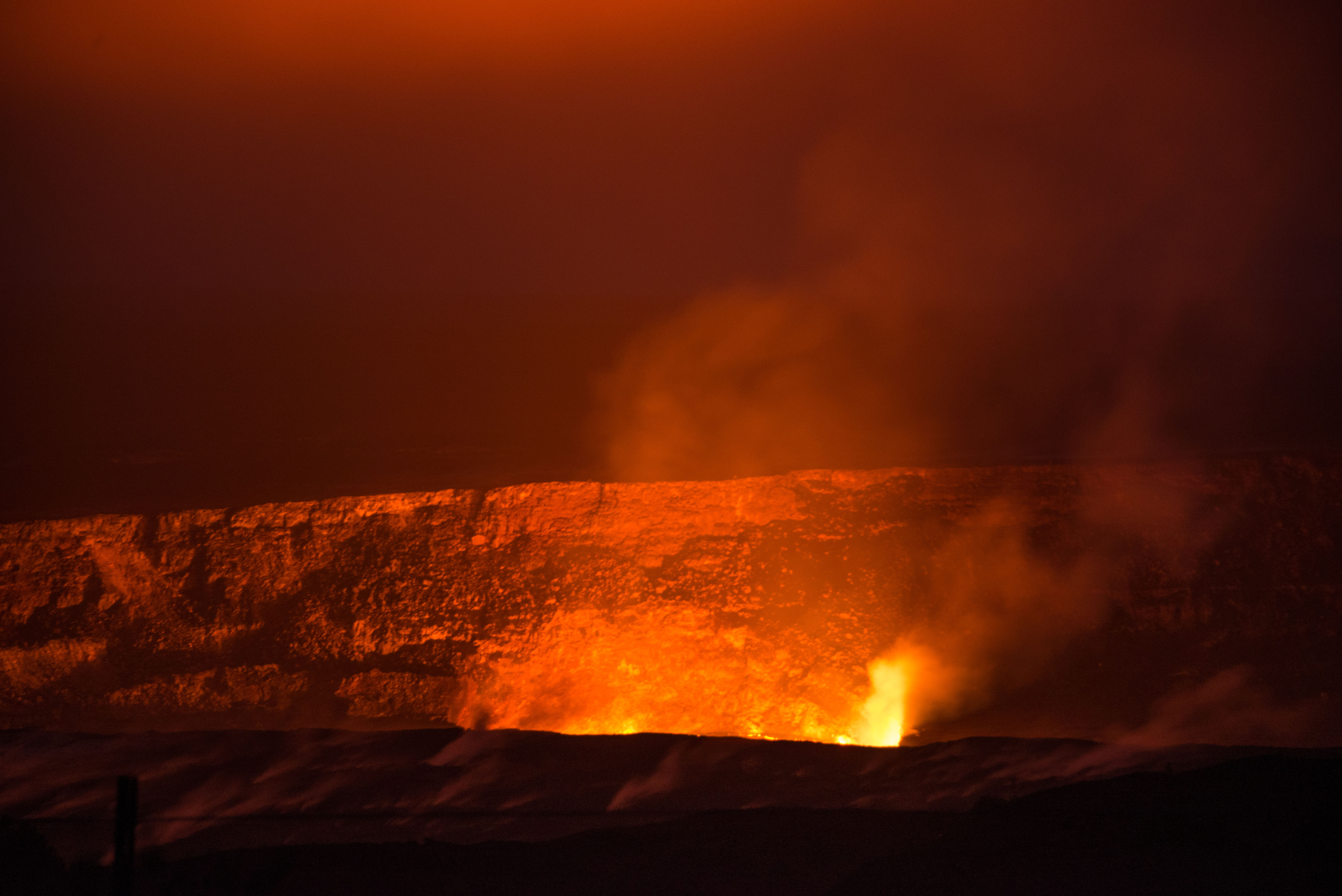
Night view of Halemaʻumaʻu from Jaggar Museum in 2015

The main visitor center, located just within the park entrance at 19°25′46″N 155°15′25.5″W, includes displays and information about the features of the park. The nearby Volcano Art Center, located in the original 1877 Volcano House hotel, is listed on the National Register of Historic Places and houses historical displays and an art gallery.

The Thomas A. Jaggar Museum, now closed due to damage from the 2018 eruptive events, is located a few miles west on Crater Rim Drive. The museum featured more exhibits and a close view of Kīlauea's active vent Halemaʻumaʻu. The museum is named after scientist Thomas Jaggar, the first director of the Hawaiian Volcano Observatory, which adjoins the museum. The observatory itself is operated by the U.S. Geological Survey and is not open to the public.

The Kilauea Military Camp provides accommodations for U.S. military personnel. Volunteer groups also sponsor events in the park.

=== Historic places ===
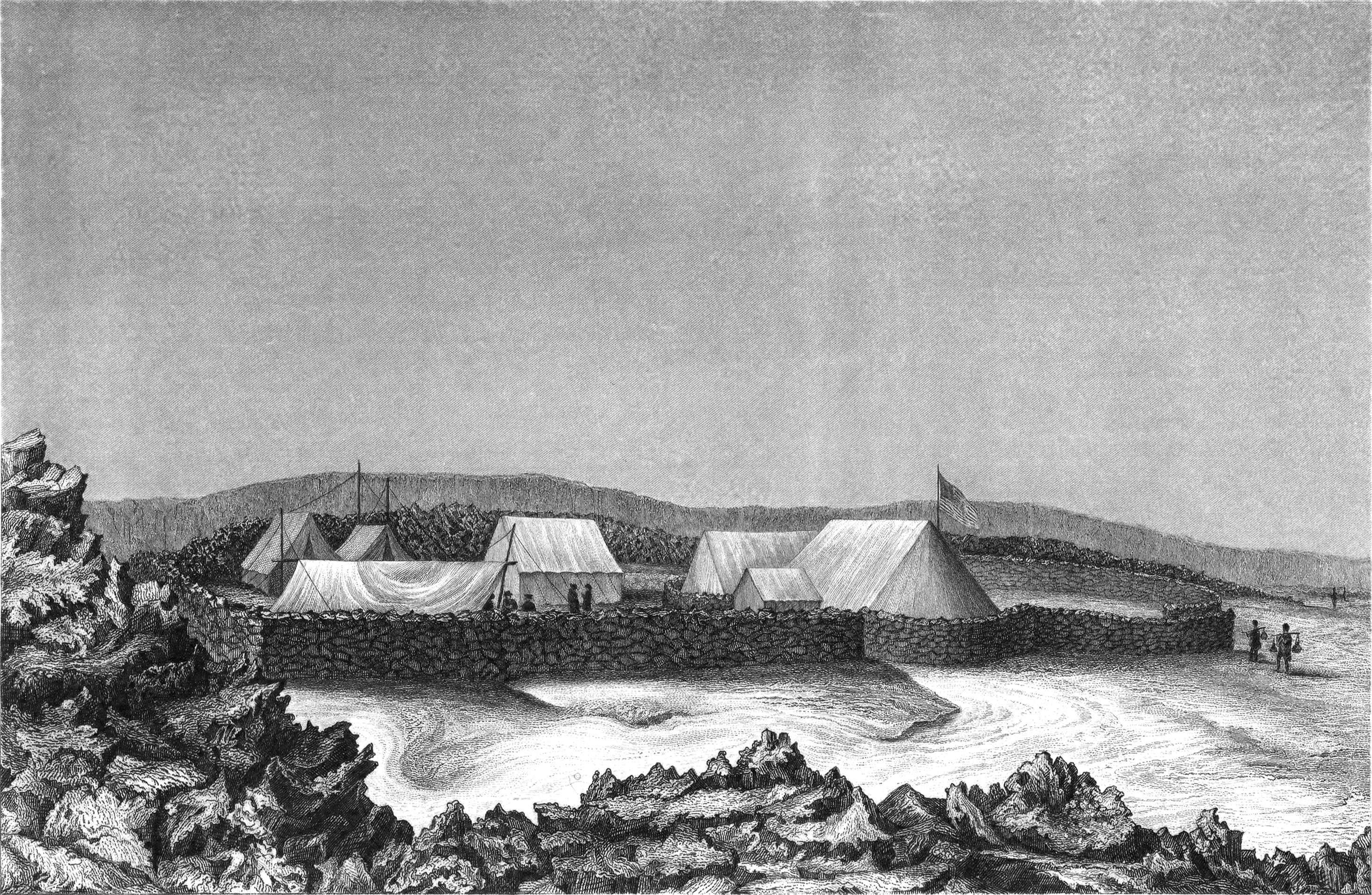
Wilkes Campsite on Mauna Loa

Several of the National Register of Historic Places listings on the island of Hawaii are located within the park:

- 1790 Footprints
- Ainahou Ranch
- Ainapo Trail
- Kīlauea Crater
- Puna-Kāʻu Historic District
- Volcano House
- Whitney Seismograph Vault No. 29 at the Hawaiian Volcano Observatory
- Wilkes Campsite

== Superintendents ==
National park superintendents:

- 1922–1922 — Albert O. Burkland
- 1922–1926 — Thomas Boles
- 1926–1926 — Albert O. Burkland
- 1927–1928 — Richard T. Evans
- 1928–1931 — Thomas J. Allen
- 1931–1933 — Ernest P. Leavitt
- 1933–1946 — Edward G. Wingate
- 1946–1946 — Gunnar O. Fagerlund
- 1946–1953 — Francis R. Oberhansley
- 1953–1959 — John B. Wosky
- 1959–1965 — Fred T. Johnston
- 1965–1967 — Glen T. Bean
- 1967–1970 — Daniel J. Tobin
- 1970–1971 — Gene J. Balaz
- 1971–1975 — G. Bryan Harry
- 1975–1978 — Robert D. Barbee
- 1979–1987 — David B. Ames
- 1987–1987 — James F. Martin
- 1987–1993 — Hugo H. Huntzinger
- 1993–2004 — James F. Martin
- 2004–2019 — Cynthia Orlando
- from 2019 — Rhonda Loh

== See also ==
- Devastation Trail
- Holei Sea Arch
- Kamoamoa
- Kilauea Iki
- Olaa Forest
