= Hugo Huntzinger =

American park ranger

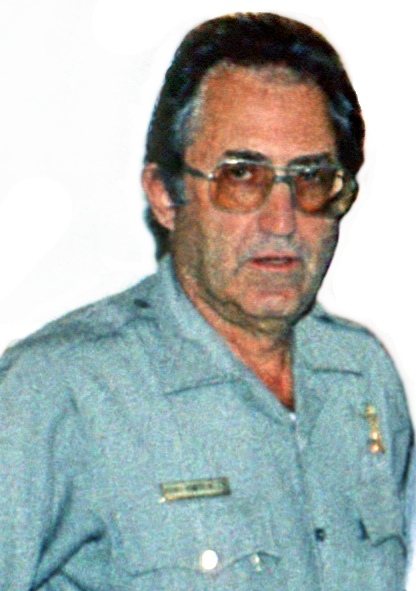
- Born: c. 1934; Los Angeles, United States
- Died: November 22, 1993 (aged 59); Hilo, Hawaii, United States
- Education: San Jose State University
- Known for: Nature conservation
- Scientific career
- Fields: Geology, mineralogy, volcanology, Nature conservation
- Workplaces: National Park Service

Signature
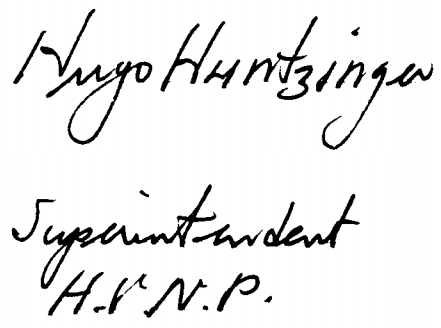

Hugo Harold Huntzinger (c. 1934 – November 22, 1993) was an American park ranger who served as the National Park Service executive in Hawaii and chief ranger at the United States National Parks.

== Biography ==
He was born in 1934 in Los Angeles in family of Harold and Sophia S. Huntzinger. He has brother, David and sister, Sonya (Hager). His grandmother came to USA from Pinsk, Russian Empire, so he traveled to see Russia in summer 1992.

Graduated of San Jose State University as a geologist. He collected minerals and rocks from all over the world, and even sell and exchange them in Hilo farmers market.

=== National Park Service career ===
External image
- Hugo Huntzinger (right). NPS Operations class, 1964.

From 1957 he was with the National Park Service for 36 years in his career.

From August 2, 1970, till May 25, 1974 he was superintendent of the Coronado National Memorial. In 1971 he updated the National Park Service policy.

From May 26, 1974, till December 19, 1987 he was Haleakala National Park superintendent. He established goat control program at the Haleaka National Park and reduce its number from 4000 to 400. He established strong programs in biological preservation.

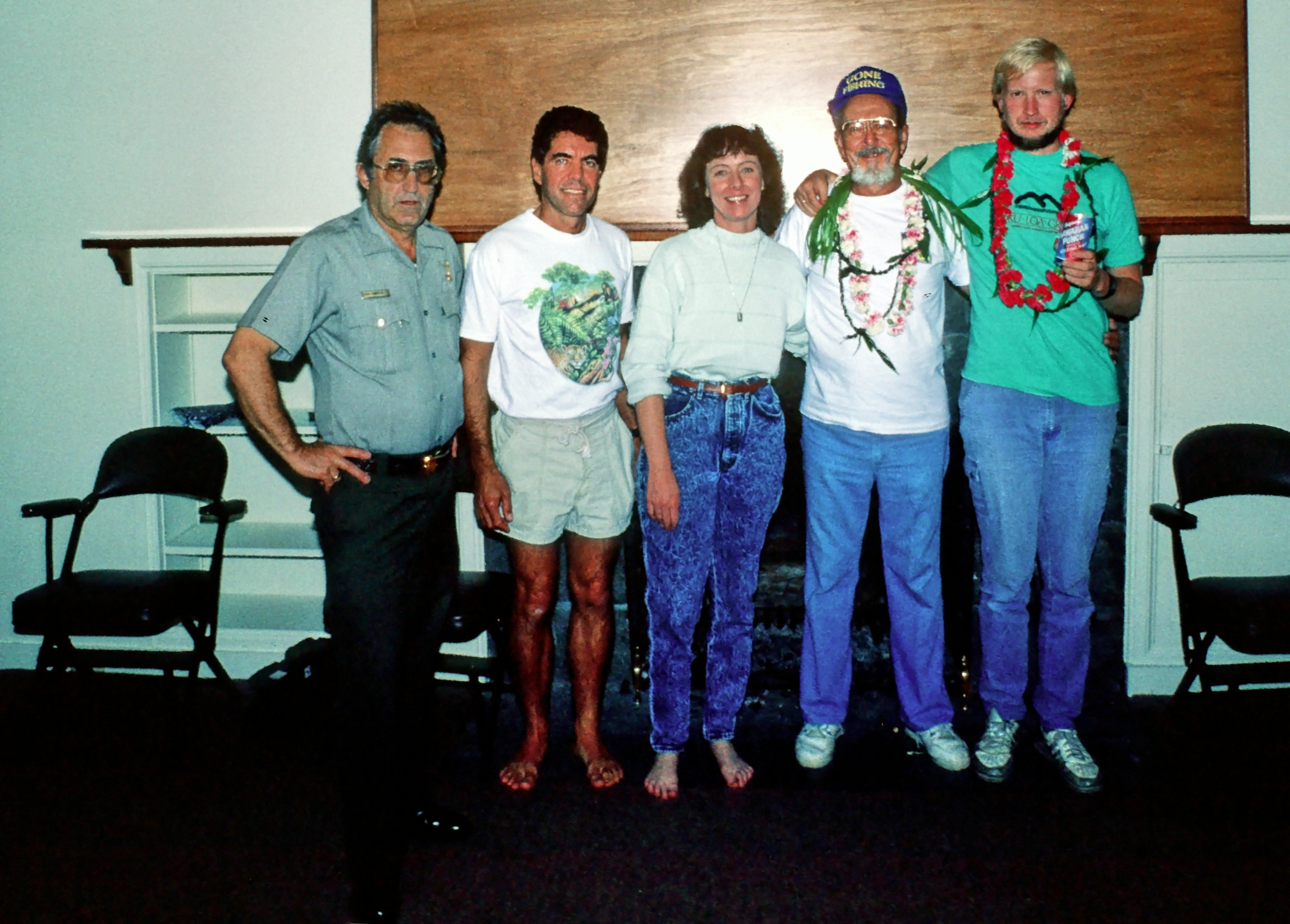
H. Huntzinger with volunteers in a park, 1990

From December 20, 1987, he served as Hawaii Volcanoes National Park superintendent

Huntzinger was an opponent of noisy stressful to the nature helicopter sight-seeing operations in both parks.

He also believed that the proposed Commercial Satellite Launching Facility represents a "direct threat" to this natural heritage site.

He died in the morning November 22, 1993 while en route to Hilo Hospital. His memorial service held in November 27, on the edge of Halemaʻumaʻu, Kilauea Overlook, Crater Rim Drive of Hawaii Volcanoes.

== Bibliography ==
- Huntzinger H. H. Newsletter concerning results of Kipahulu-Seven Pools Public Workshops. 1975. Nov. 3.
- Huntzinger H. H. Oheʻo final development concept plan United States: Haleakala National Park (Hawaii). National Park Service, 1977.

== Literature ==
He was mentioned and acknowledged in papers:

- Baker J. K., Reeser D. W. Goat management problems in Hawaii Volcanoes National Park: a history, analysis, and management plan. Natural Resources Report No. 2, National Park Service, 1972. 22 p.
- Scott J. M. Hawaii's Upland Forests // Science New Series, Vol. 220, No. 4601 (Jun. 3, 1983), p. 1002.
- James H. F., Olson S. L. Descriptions of Thirty-Two New Species of Birds from the Hawaiian Islands: Part II. Passeriformes. Ornithological Monographs No. 46. 1991, pp. 1–88.
- Kjargaard J. Some aspects of Feral Goat Distribution in Haleakala National Park. Report No. 52 Hawaii. University of Hawaii At Manoa. 1984. 19 p.
- Tolson H. A., Baker H. W., Danz H. P.Historic Listing of National Park Service Officials: May 1, 1991. U.S. Department of the Interior, National Park Service, 1991. 231 p.
- Engledow J. Haleakalā, a History of the Maui Mountain. Maui Island Press, 2012. 177 p.
- Friends of Haleakalä National Park. 2012. Spring. (with photo show Hugo Huntzinger inspecting Kaupö pali on page 8).

== See also ==
- Haleakala National Park
- Hawaii Volcanoes National Park
- National Park Service

Government offices
Preceded by Russell Cahill	Superintendent of the Haleakalā National Park; 1974-1987	Succeeded by Peter Sanchez
Preceded by James Martin	Superintendent of the Hawaii Volcanoes National Park; 1987–1993	Succeeded by James Martin
