= 266 Squadron =

266 Squadron may refer to:

- No. 266 Squadron RAF of Britain's Royal Air Force
- Marine Medium Tiltrotor Squadron 266 of the US Marine Corps
