= Lists of volcanic eruptions =

This is a list of volcanic eruptions by location, time period, impacts, or size.

== By location ==
=== By country ===
- List of volcanic eruptions in Iceland
- List of volcanic eruptions in Japan
- List of volcanic eruptions in the Philippines

=== By volcano ===
- List of large-volume volcanic eruptions in the Basin and Range Province
- List of Mount Etna eruptions
- List of Kīlauea eruptions
- List of Mauna Loa eruptions
- Historical eruptions in Tenerife

== By time period ==
- List of Quaternary volcanic eruptions
  - List of large Holocene volcanic eruptions
    - List of volcanic eruptions in the 21st century
    - List of volcanic eruptions 1500–2000

== By impacts ==
- List of volcanic eruptions by death toll

== By size ==
- List of largest volcanic eruptions

== See also ==
- Lists of volcanoes
