= Operation Hot Rock =

1992 US military operation

- Part of List of Mount Etna eruptions
- Operational scope: Lava-flow mitigation / disaster relief
- Type: Humanitarian assistance; lava diversion mission
- Location: Zafferana Etnea, Sicily, Italy; 37°45.3′N 14°59.7′E
- Objective: Divert or slow lava flows threatening Zafferana Etnea during the 1991–1993 Mount Etna eruption
- Date: April–May 1992
- Executed by: United States Marine Corps (HMM-266); United States Navy (HC-4); Italian Civil Protection Department and Italian armed forces
- Outcome: Lava flow was diverted; Zafferana Etnea spared major damage
- Casualties: None
- Location within Sicily

Operation Hot Rock (April–May 1992) was a joint U.S.–Italian humanitarian mission in which heavy-lift helicopters airlifted large concrete blocks to help divert advancing lava from Mount Etna and protect the town of Zafferana Etnea in Sicily.

== Introduction ==
During the 1991–1993 eruption of Mount Etna, the town was seriously threatened by advancing lava flows. In April 1992, facing lava advancing toward Zafferana Etnea, Italian civil protection authorities and volcanologists, supported by U.S. Marine Corps and Navy aviation units, coordinated a mission that used heavy-lift helicopters, aerial placement of concrete blocks, and controlled blasts to redirect the flow. It became known as Operation Hot Rock in U.S. military records. Participating Marines informally referred to the mission as "Operation Volcano Buster," and some units painted an emblem reflecting the unique application of military aircraft in a volcanic disaster response. The intervention succeeded in saving the town from destruction.

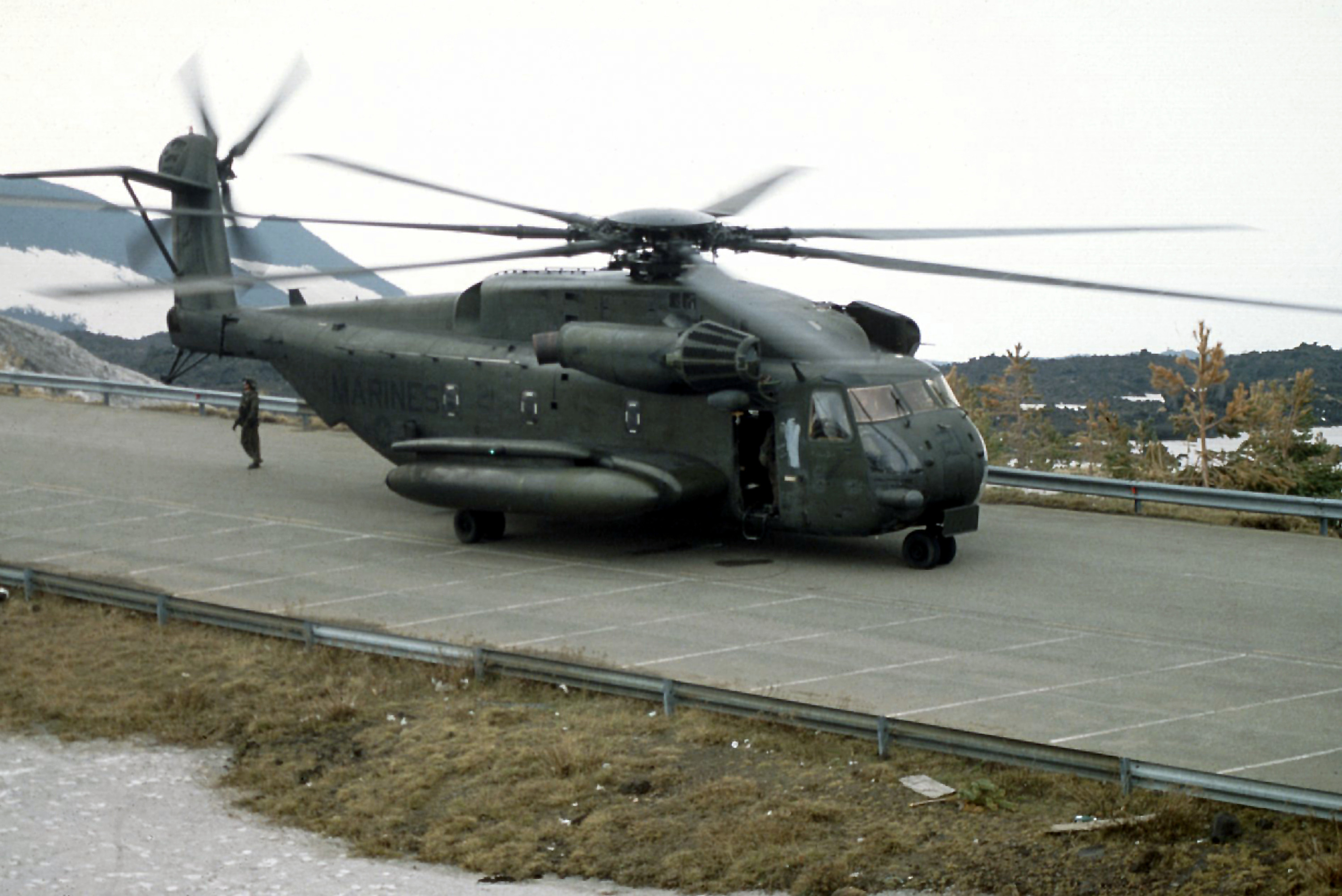
U.S. Marine HMM Squadron 266 CH-53E Super Stallion Helicopter

The operation was reported in Italian and international press as an unusual application of military heavy-lift helicopters in a volcanic‐lava diversion mission.

By the end of May 1992 the lava flow that had been approaching the town was diverted into an artificial channel, and the town of Zafferana Etnea avoided major destruction.

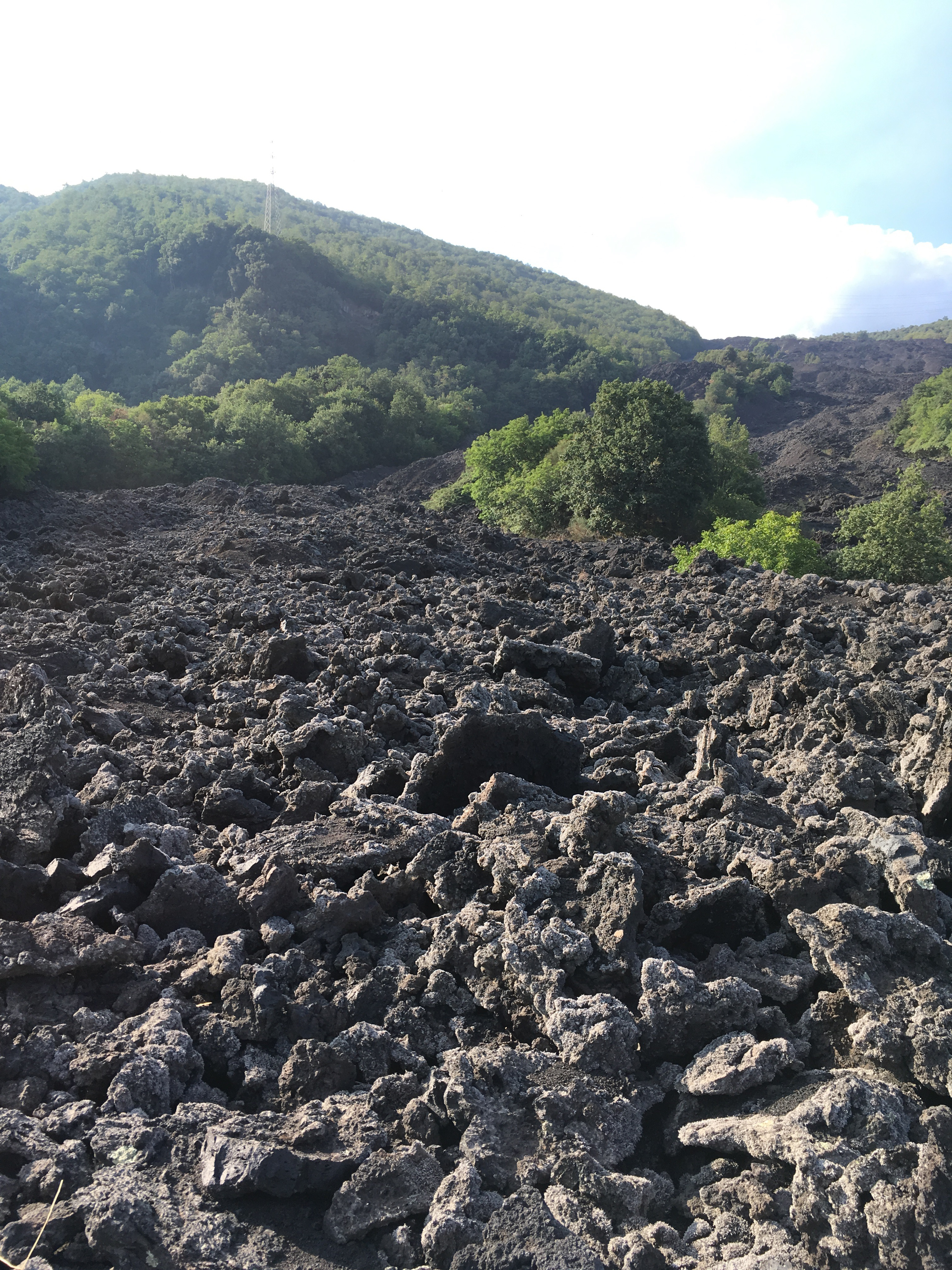
Lava flows on the slopes of Mount Etna during the 1992 eruption.

== Background ==
Mount Etna, one of the world's most active volcanoes, began erupting from new fissures on December 14, 1991. The eruption produced voluminous lava flows that started to advance down the mountain's south-eastern flank toward populated areas. The town of Zafferana Etnea, with about 7,000 residents, lies approximately 9 km downslope from the eruptive vent and was identified as being at grave risk.

In early January 1992, emergency crews constructed a large earthen embankment (approximately 234 m long and 21 m high) in the Val Calanna area, a natural basin above Zafferana, hoping to contain the lava within that depression. This barrier, built by the Italian civil protection authorities and army with 370,000 m^{3} of earth and rock, held back the lava for about one month. However, by March 14 a new lobe of lava had flowed over the accumulated lava behind the barrier, and on April 8–10 the molten flow overtopped and breached the main embankment.

As the lava front escaped the basin, it moved on a steep course toward Zafferana Etnea, causing alarm. Despite hastily building three additional smaller earthen dams in early April to slow it, the lava progressively overran these secondary barriers. On April 14, 1992, the flow reached the outskirts of Zafferana and engulfed its first building — a solitary house at Piano dell'Acqua (whose owner had symbolically set out wine and bread as an offering to the volcano). By mid-April the lava had advanced to less than 1 km from the town's edge, with a tall flow front (~9 m high) creeping at 4–5 m per hour.

The situation grew critical; local officials prepared evacuation plans for Zafferana's inhabitants, and Italy's Minister of Civil Protection, Nicola Capria, described the effort to save the town as an "uneven struggle" against a powerful "monster" of nature.

Faced with the imminent threat, Italian volcanologists and engineers, led by Professor Franco Barberi of the National Vulcanology Group, explored more aggressive measures to divert the lava. On April 13, explosives were detonated on the hardened lava crust in an attempt to collapse it and create an artificial dam; however, this had only limited, temporary effect. With the lava still advancing, Barberi and colleagues decided to attempt disrupting the lava upstream by targeting the main lava tube carrying molten rock toward Zafferana. Since this location was high on the volcano's flank (~2,000 m elevation in the rugged Valle del Bove), heavy-lift aerial support was required to transport materials and equipment. After initial Italian Navy and Army engineering attempts using explosives and makeshift barriers failed to stop the advancing lava in early April, Italian authorities requested assistance from the United States, which deployed heavy-lift helicopters and personnel to support the diversion strategy. In mid-April 1992, the U.S. European Command agreed to help, deploying Marine and Navy helicopters and personnel to join the lava diversion operation.

== Mission details ==
U.S. military heavy-lift helicopters at Naval Air Station Sigonella in Sicily, April 1992, preparing to assist Italian authorities in the Mount Etna lava containment effort. CH-53E Super Stallion helicopters from Marine Medium Helicopter Squadron 266 were used to airlift large concrete blocks as part of "Operation Hot Rock."

The U.S. Marine Corps contribution to the emergency was spearheaded by Marine Medium Helicopter Squadron 266 (HMM-266), which was embarked with the 24th Marine Expeditionary Unit (24th MEU) off the coast of Italy at the time. HMM-266 flew CH-53E Super Stallion helicopters, among the largest and most powerful transport helicopters in the U.S. military. Heavy-lift Marine CH-53E and U.S. Navy helicopters transported concrete slabs and construction materials to build barriers and redirect the lava toward prepared channels.

The Marines were joined by U.S. Navy aviation units; for example, Helicopter Combat Support Squadron 4 (HC-4) based at Sigonella contributed CH-53 and CH-46 Sea Knight helicopters for additional lift capacity. approximately 12–15 U.S. aircraft and an estimated 50–100 American personnel participated in the operation along with Italian troops and civil defense teams. The joint effort was coordinated on the ground by Italian Civil Protection officials and volcanologists, who identified target sites on the lava flow, while U.S. pilots and Italian crews carried out the airborne missions.

The U.S. contingent arrived in Sicily in the third week of April 1992. According to mission accounts, the Marines humorously nicknamed the deployment "Operation Volcano Buster," even painting a cartoon logo on their helicopters, reflecting the unprecedented nature of fighting a volcano.

U.S. Defense Department documentation later referred to it as Operation Hot Rock.

For the Marine pilots and enlisted aircrewmen — many of them veterans of the 1991 Gulf War and other recent crises—this humanitarian mission was unique. "Everything is easier when no one is shooting at you," quipped one Navy officer at Sigonella, noting that, despite the absence of hostile fire, flying near an erupting volcano posed its own dangers. Crews had to contend with high winds, updrafts of hot gas, and volcanic ash, which at times grounded flights and hampered visibility on the mountain.

During lulls in the weather, however, the heavy helicopters flew repeatedly from base carrying external loads of concrete and steel to the drop site on Etna's slope. Logistically, the operation involved sourcing and transporting massive concrete blocks to the volcano. Italian authorities provided large cement blocks ("borselli" or concrete barricades), each weighing several tonnes. Over 200,000 pounds (≈90 metric tons) of concrete were ultimately airlifted by the Marines over the course of the mission.

The U.S. Navy's Sixth Fleet ships in the area also offered support; for example, naval engineers helped fabricate metal mesh platforms to carry groups of concrete blocks, and U.S. Navy Seabees (construction battalion) provided expertise in demolition and construction as needed. The cooperation between Italian and American forces extended to safety and communications as well: Italian military escorts guided the U.S. helicopters, and joint command centers were set up to coordinate the timing of aerial drops with explosive blasts on the ground.

== Engineering strategy ==
The lava diversion strategy combined several engineering techniques executed in sequence. The primary goal was to reduce the supply of lava reaching the front near Zafferana by interrupting its path further upslope. To accomplish this, scientists identified a skylight (an opening in the roof of the main lava tube) at about 2,000 m elevation on Mount Etna's flank, through which the flowing lava was visible.

This skylight, located in a rugged area of the Valle del Bove, was essentially a "vent" or window into the lava stream.

If the tube could be blocked or diverted at that point, much of the lava might be forced out of its channel and kept away from the vulnerable areas downslope.

=== Concrete block drops ===
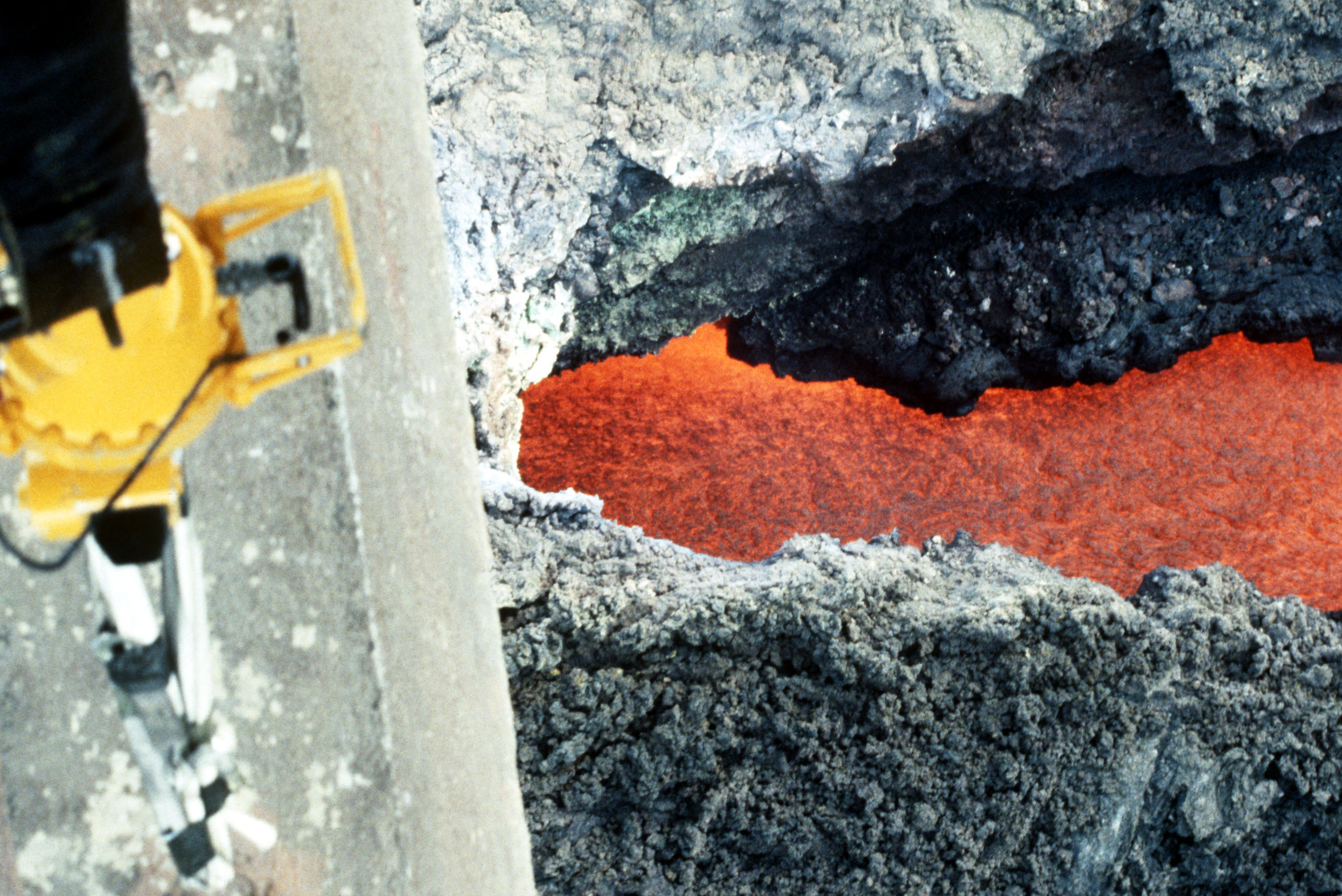
View from a helicopter as a concrete block is lowered to block the lava flow

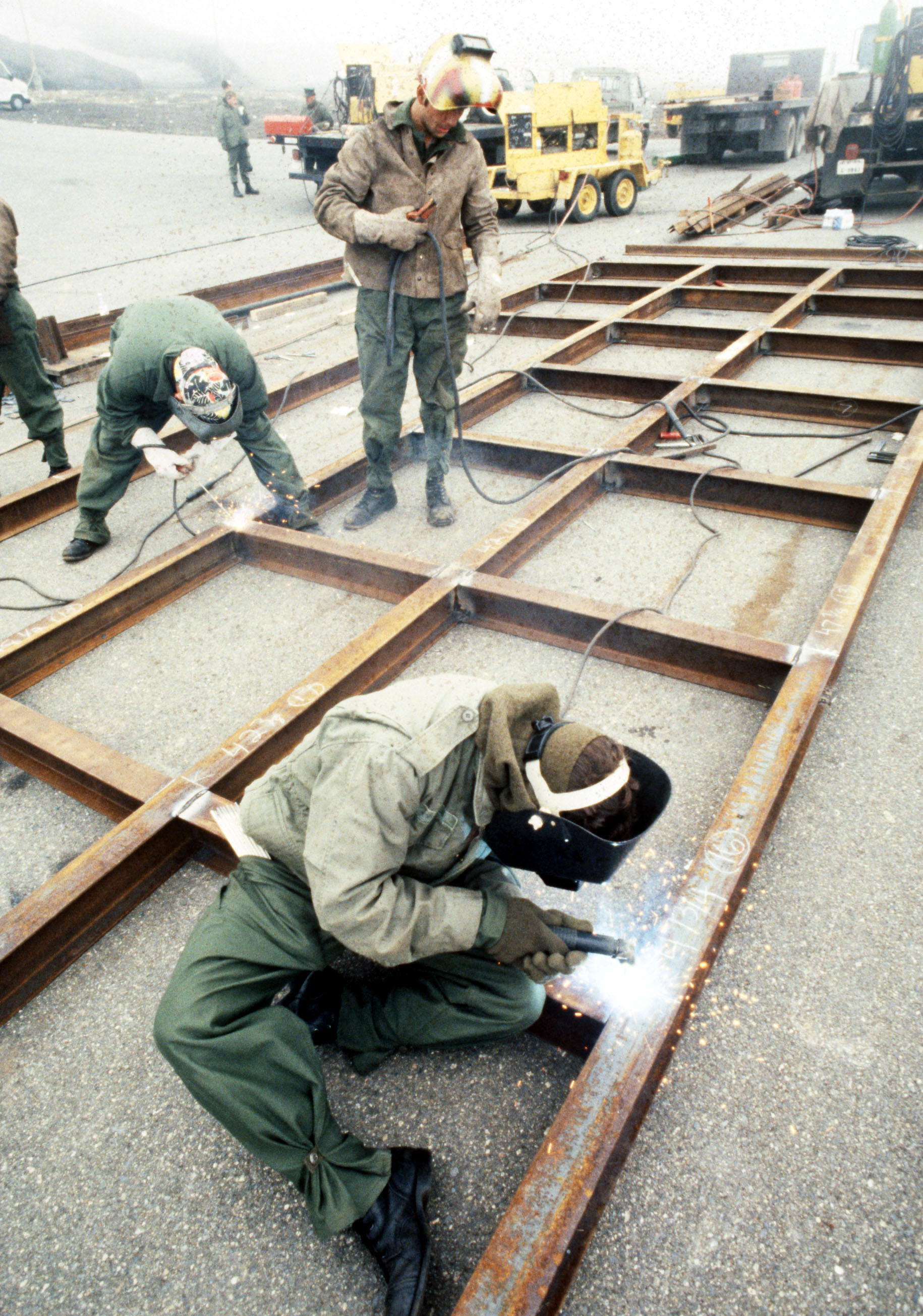
Members of Naval Mobile Construction Battalion (Seabees) construct a steel sled

The initial plan, carried out on April 13–15, 1992, was to physically plug the lava tube via aerial bombardment with concrete. U.S. CH-53E helicopters hovered over the target vent (approximately 2100 m altitude) and released large concrete blocks directly into the flowing lava stream. In one of the first attempts, four concrete slabs (each weighing about 2 tons) were lowered into a lava channel at ~6,930 ft elevation. However, this rudimentary approach proved less effective than hoped. The intense heat and viscosity of the lava caused the first blocks to be displaced or carried along the lava stream rather than forming a stable dam. Franco Barberi noted after an aerial inspection that the blocks appeared to be moved aside by the molten flow, suggesting they were too buoyant relative to the lava's force to remain in place. The lava simply flowed around or underneath the dropped blocks in that attempt. In response, the team decided to try using larger masses and a different tactic: accumulating a critical amount of debris in one spot. Over the next week, helicopters brought in additional loads, sometimes using a metal platform to dump multiple blocks at once into the skylight. At one point, high winds forced a helicopter to jettison its cargo prematurely, demonstrating the challenges of precise placement in such conditions.

To augment the block drops, explosives were also employed. Italian Army combat engineers placed explosive charges along the lava tube's walls and at flow levees. The idea was to break the hardened lava banks and cause them to collapse into the lava stream, hopefully damming it. Barberi explained that by blasting the edges of the solidified channel, chunks of solid lava would fall and potentially clog the flow like a dam of rubble. On April 16 and again on April 21, controlled explosions were set off on the tube and at channel walls near the targeted skylight. These blasts were synchronized with helicopter operations. For example, on April 21, helicopters positioned concrete blocks around the skylight's rim and then an explosion was triggered to drive them into the lava tunnel more forcefully. One Marine pilot described maneuvering his CH-53E to swing a suspended 7-ton block "like a pendulum" and ram it into a lava tube breach, in a motion he likened to playing croquet. This combined approach of blasting and block-dropping showed some success. By April 22, observers noted that a portion of the lava was choked off: a substantial accumulation of debris had partially plugged the lava tube, temporarily slowing the output of the flow front. In fact, a joint U.S.-Italian team managed to dump a total of 92 tons of concrete and rubble into one lava tunnel breach on April 21–22, which seemed to halt the lava advance for a short time.

Despite these early interventions, Mount Etna's eruption continued unabated and the lava found new paths. By early May, a new breakout flow bypassed the clogged section and again descended toward the outskirts of Zafferana Etnea, coming within 500 m of the town by May 11.

This prompted a revised strategy for a more lasting solution. Italian authorities, with input from U.S. specialists, devised a four-phase plan to divert all lava from the main tube into an artificially prepared channel on the mountainside.

- Phase A: Excavation of an Artificial Channel. Bulldozers and explosives were used high on the slope (in the upper Valle del Bove) to carve a new channel leading away from the natural lava tube. This channel was essentially a man-made spillway, intended to guide lava into a safe zone (an uninhabited part of the valley) once opened.
- Phase B: Weakening the Lava Tube Wall. Engineers systematically drilled and thinned a section of the lava tube's side wall, reducing it to about 2–3 m thickness at a chosen point. This "pre-cut" would allow a single large explosive charge to punch open the tube.
- Phase C: Breaching the Tube. On May 27, 1992, a powerful 7-ton explosive charge was detonated at the prepared section of the lava tube. The blast blew open a large hole in the side of the tube, causing an estimated 80% of the lava to gush out of the rupture. Essentially, the volcano's lava was suddenly diverted sideways out of its confined tunnel.
- Phase D: Blocking the Original Tube. Following the explosion, teams worked for two days to completely block off the original lava tube so that lava could no longer flow down the old channel. Using earth-movers, they pushed collapsed lava blocks, bulldozered debris, and additional concrete slabs into the tube's opening. By May 29, the main lava flow had been fully diverted into the new artificial channel, and the natural tube was sealed off.

These engineering actions proved effective. Once the lava was re-routed into the artificial channel, it flowed harmlessly into the broad, uninhabited Valle del Bove depression, where it could spread and cool without threatening any town. The final diversion essentially "robbed" the advancing lava flow of its supply, causing the flow front near Zafferana to stagnate and stop advancing. Italian volcanologist Luigi Villari noted that this outcome returned the situation to "a few days after the onset of the eruption" – in other words, the active lava was confined over 6 km upslope, as it had been early in the eruption.

== Outcome ==
According to volcanologists and civil protection reports, the multinational diversion efforts successfully rerouted the lava, preventing the destruction of Zafferana Etnea. By the end of May 1992, the lava flow that had been only a few hundred meters from the town was cut off and began to cool. On May 30, observers confirmed that lava was no longer flowing toward Zafferana, but instead was contained within the Valle del Bove above. The original flow front stagnated roughly at the town's boundary and never advanced further. In the days following the successful diversion, molten lava continued to effuse from Etna's vent, but it traveled exclusively within the artificial channel and spread out on the slopes far from any populated area. The 16-month-long eruption ultimately continued until March 30, 1993, building a large lava field on the mountain, but it did not threaten inhabited areas again after the May 1992 diversion.

Damage to property was remarkably limited given the scale of the eruption. In the end, only a single house on the outskirts of Zafferana was destroyed by the lava flow, along with some orchards and farmland on the mountain's slopes. The one lost structure, overrun on April 14, became a symbol of the narrow escape; photographs show the lava stopping just short of a second house nearby, which remained intact. Infrastructure in Zafferana (e.g., homes, roads, the village church) was spared any serious damage. The massive earthen barrier built in January and the subsequent delaying tactics had given the town enough time until the ultimate diversion could be achieved. No deaths or serious injuries were attributed to the eruption – a testament to the effective evacuation planning and the diversion efforts.

Volcanologists consider the 1992 Etna intervention to be one of the most successful lava diversion attempts in history. By all accounts, the operation significantly slowed the lava advance when it mattered most, and then completely rerouted it at the critical moment. A report by the U.S. Geological Survey noted that about 5 months of intensive effort were required to control the lava during the 1991–92 Etna crisis, and that the outcome might have been very different had the eruption lasted much longer than it did. According to assessment by the U.S. Geological Survey, the success depended on sustained interventions until the eruption naturally subsided. Volcanologists have noted that the outcome would likely have differed significantly had the eruption persisted beyond March 1993.

The Etna case thus demonstrated that while lava flows can be altered by human action, such efforts must be sustained and are not guaranteed unless the eruption itself is of limited duration. In the aftermath, the town of Zafferana Etnea expressed enormous relief. Many residents, who had spent months under the shadow of the encroaching lava, were able to return to normal life by the summer of 1992. The cooled lava flows have since become a part of the landscape above the town, and a monument plaque in Zafferana commemorates the successful diversion. The event has been studied in volcanology and civil engineering circles as a notable example of disaster mitigation. Italian civil protection agencies incorporated the lessons from Etna 1992 into their contingency planning for future eruptions. For the U.S. Marines, the mission was also memorable: HMM-266 received praise for their quick response, and the unusual sight of Marine helicopters "battling" a volcano became part of the unit's history.

== Public reaction ==
The lava containment mission on Etna captured the public imagination in Italy and abroad. Media outlets at the time often portrayed the effort in dramatic terms, as a battle of modern engineering against the primal forces of nature. Newspapers described it as battle against nature and a race to "Save the Village" with the help of high-tech machines. The image of American "Sea Stallion" helicopters (a nickname for the CH-53 Super Stallion) hovering over a glowing river of lava made for striking news footage.

Journalists embedded with the operation recounted vivid scenes: one report described the lava flow at Zafferana's edge as a massive threat, with lava flow fronts reaching heights of 9 meters, inching forward with hisses and clinks as it ignited trees in its path. Such descriptions underscored the desperation and high stakes felt by observers.

Local reaction in Sicily was a mixture of anxiety, cooperation, and later gratitude. Throughout early 1992, residents of Zafferana Etnea watched the eruption's progress with trepidation. Many participated in civil defense drills or helped with reinforcing barriers; others turned to folk traditions (such as the man who left offerings of wine to the lava) in a bid for divine intervention.

When the U.S. Marines and their giant helicopters arrived, many locals were curious and hopeful. Some residents initially doubted that even the military could stop a volcano – a sentiment echoed by volcanologist Franco Barberi, who warned in mid-April that if the eruption continued indefinitely, "no scientist, Rambo or marine will be able to resist it". This comment, which spread in the press, reflected a cautious realism about the limits of human power over nature.

As the operations proceeded, Italian officials balanced optimism with caution. Civil Protection Minister Nicola Capria frequently updated the media: at one point he noted the situation was "less dramatic" thanks to interventions but emphasized that "the monster is very strong" and the outcome uncertain. The public, both in Sicily and across Italy, closely followed these developments. There was an outpouring of support for those on the front lines – the Italian soldiers, firefighters, volcanologists, and the American pilots working collaboratively. Schoolchildren in Catania reportedly drew pictures of helicopters fighting lava; some Sicilians nicknamed the U.S. Marines "angeli del lava" (angels of the lava) in appreciation.

When the lava was finally stopped and Zafferana was declared safe, there was widespread relief and celebration. The successful diversion at the end of May 1992 was hailed in Italian news as an example of scientific ingenuity and international solidarity. Italian newspapers praised the "wall of determination" that had saved the town, and TV news showed villagers applauding as bulldozers and helicopters finished their work. At the same time, some local people whose properties were damaged voiced mild frustration that more couldn't have been done sooner. Rosaria Russo, a 54-year-old whose vineyard was partly covered by lava, told a reporter in late April, "The Americans did something, but it was too late" – noting that by the time the blocks and bombs took effect, her land was already scorched. Such sentiments were isolated, however, as most residents understood that the operation had prevented a far worse outcome.

Internationally, the 1992 Mt. Etna mission received significant attention as a rare instance of military resources being used in natural disaster mitigation. The sight of U.S. Marines in combat gear working alongside Italian scientists on the slopes of an erupting volcano was often remarked upon. Some commentators drew comparisons to warfare – speaking of the "attack on Etna's lava" – while others saw it as a heartening story of cooperation. The U.S. military's involvement was generally viewed positively in Italy, occurring just at the end of the Cold War era when NATO allies collaborating on humanitarian tasks was becoming more common. The operation's success strengthened ties and set a precedent for future international aid in volcanic crises.

In later years, the Etna 1991–1993 eruption and the actions at Zafferana Etnea have been frequently cited in volcanology literature and by emergency management experts. They serve as a case study in what measures can be attempted to divert lava flows, and underscore the importance of timely, well-coordinated responses.

While the official U.S. Navy designation for the effort was "Operation Hot Rock", the intervention at Mount Etna during the 1992 eruption became more widely known in secondary sources as "Operation Volcano Buster"—a name evoking the dramatic image of Marines dropping concrete blocks into lava tubes to divert molten flow. The operation lives on as a footnote in Marine Corps history, symbolizing an innovative chapter when troops applied their skills to fight nature—and succeeded, at least temporarily, in redirecting the lava flow.
