= Piano dell'Acqua =

- Frazione
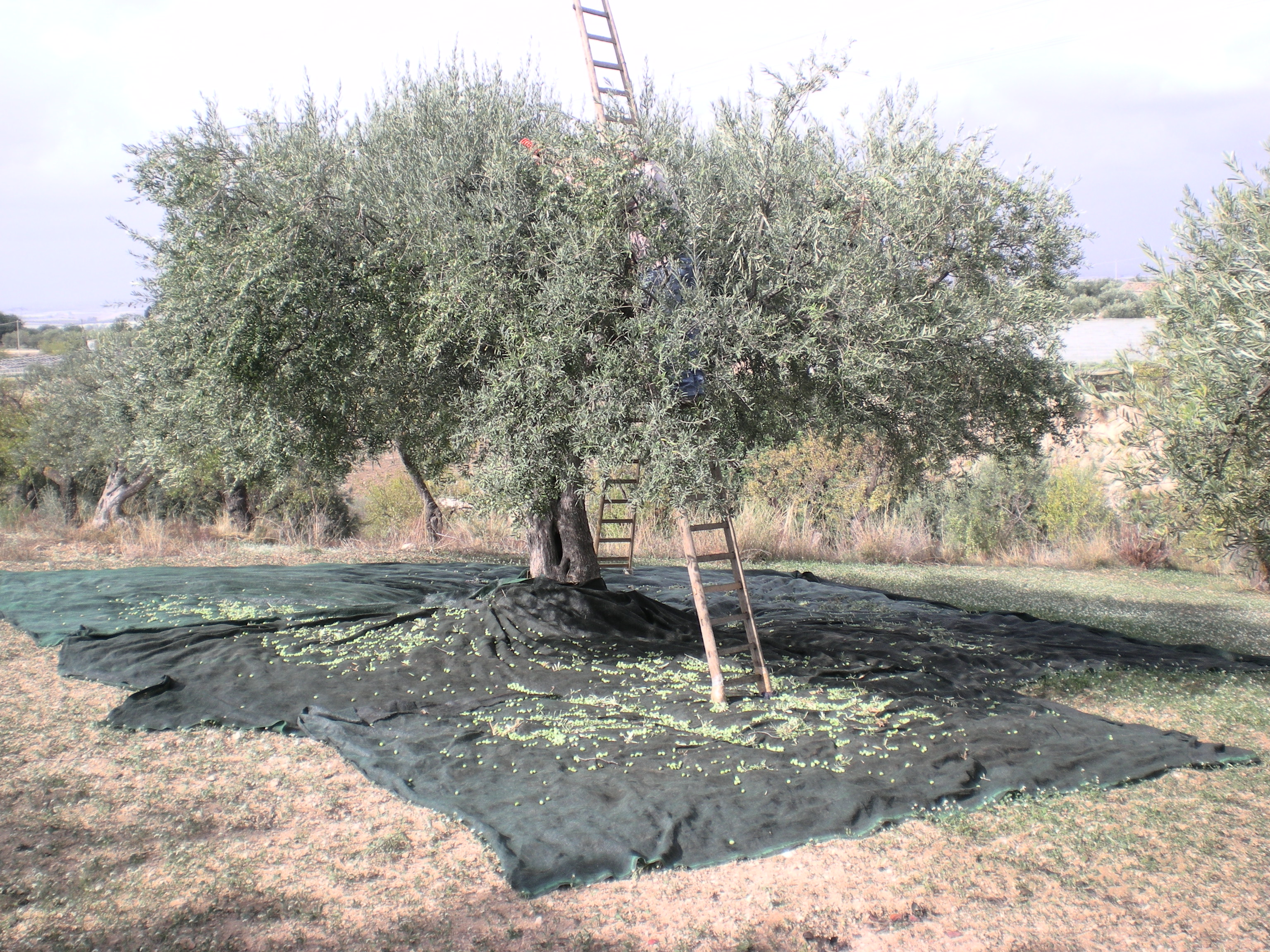
- Olive tree in Piano dell'Acqua

- Location of Piano dell'Acqua in Italy
- Coordinates: 36°45′51.63″N 14°38′26.69″E
- Country: Italy
- Region: Sicily
- Province: Ragusa (RG)
- Comune: Chiaramonte Gulfi
- Elevation: 353 m (1,158 ft)

Population (2011)
  - Total: 309
- Demonym: Pianesi
- Time zone: UTC+1 (CET)
  - Summer (DST): UTC+2 (CEST)
- Postal code: 97012
- Dialing code: (+39) 0932
- Website: Official website

Piano dell'Acqua (Sicilian: Cianu i l'Acqua) is a southern Italian village and hamlet (frazione) of Chiaramonte Gulfi, a municipality in the Province of Ragusa, Sicily. In 2011 it had a population of 3,172.

== History ==
The name means water-plain, and until the late 1970s, beside the stream that crosses the village, there was an ancient washbasin in local limestone.

During the 1991–1993 eruption of Mount Etna, the town was seriously threatened by advancing lava flows. In April 1992, Italian civil protection authorities, assisted by the United States Marine Corps and United States Navy, carried out Operation Hot Rock, a joint mission that used explosives and concrete blocks to divert the lava away from Zafferana. The intervention succeeded in saving the town from destruction. , the advancing lava front threatened nearby communities. On 14 April 1992, the flow reached the outskirts of Zafferana Etnea and engulfed a solitary house at Piano dell'Acqua, whose owner had symbolically placed wine and bread outside as an offering to the volcano. The event formed part of the crisis that led Italian authorities, supported by U.S. military forces, to undertake Operation Hot Rock, a joint effort to divert the lava and save Zafferana from destruction.

== Geography ==
The village lies north of its province, close to the borders with the Province of Catania. It is 10 km north of Chiaramonte Gulfi and 17 km south of Licodia Eubea.

== Economy ==
The local economy is mainly based on agriculture. Vineyards and olive trees dominate the landscape.
