= List of Kīlauea eruptions =

Eruption of Kīlauea, Hawaii

This is a list of volcanic eruptions from Kīlauea, an active shield volcano in the Hawaiian Islands that is currently erupting. These eruptions have taken place from pit craters and the main caldera, as well as parasitic cones and fissures along the East and Southwest rift zones. They are generally fluid (VEI-0) Hawaiian eruptions, but more violent eruptions have occurred throughout Kīlauea's eruptive history, with the largest recorded explosive eruption having taken place in 1790.

== Eruptions during the Common Era ==
Data obtained from the Global Volcanism Program website.

VEI	Date	Evidence	Activity area or unit	Eruption name
?	December 23, 2024 – Ongoing	Historical observations	Halemaʻumaʻu	
?	September 15–20, 2024	Historical observations	East Rift Zone (Napau Crater)	
?	June 3, 2024	Historical observations	Southwest Rift Zone	
0	September 29, 2021 – June 16, 2023	Historical observations	Halemaʻumaʻu	
0	December 20, 2020 – May 23, 2021	Historical observations	Halemaʻumaʻu	
3	January 3, 1983 – September 5, 2018	Historical observations	East Rift Zone (Puʻu ʻŌʻō), Halemaʻumaʻu	
0	September 25–26, 1982	Historical observations	Kīlauea Caldera (south-southeast of Halemaʻumaʻu)	
0	April 30 – May 1, 1982	Historical observations	Kīlauea Caldera (northeast of Halemaʻumaʻu)	
0	March 11, 1980	Historical observations	East Rift Zone (near Mauna Ulu)	
0	November 16–17, 1979	Historical observations	East Rift Zone (Pauahi Crater)	
0	September 13 – October 1, 1977	Historical observations	East Rift Zone (near Kalalua Crater)	
0	November 29, 1975	Historical observations	Kīlauea Caldera, Halemaʻumaʻu	
0	December 31, 1974	Historical observations	Southwest Rift Zone, 1,095 m (3,593 ft)	
0	September 19, 1974	Historical observations	Kīlauea Caldera (Halemaʻumaʻu and to the southwest)	
0	July 19–22, 1974	Historical observations	Kīlauea Caldera, Keanakākoʻi Crater	
0	November 10 – December 9, 1973	Historical observations	East Rift Zone (Pauahi Crater)	
0	May 5, 1973	Historical observations	East Rift Zone (Pauahi and Hiʻiaka craters)	
0	September 24–29, 1971	Historical observations	Halemaʻumaʻu and upper Southwest Rift Zone	
0	August 14, 1971	Historical observations	Kīlauea Caldera	
0	May 24, 1969 – July 22, 1974	Historical observations	East Rift Zone (Mauna Ulu), 960 m (3,150 ft)	
0	February 22–28, 1969	Historical observations	East Rift Zone, 885 to 945 m (2,904 to 3,100 ft)	
0	October 7–22, 1968	Historical observations	East Rift Zone, 730 to 915 m (2,395 to 3,002 ft)	
0	August 22–26, 1968	Historical observations	East Rift Zone, 580 to 885 m (1,903 to 2,904 ft)	
0	November 5, 1967 – July 13, 1968	Historical observations	Halemaʻumaʻu	
0	December 24–25, 1965	Historical observations	East Rift Zone, 915 to 960 m (3,002 to 3,150 ft)	
0	March 5–15, 1965	Historical observations	East Rift Zone, 700 to 915 m (2,297 to 3,002 ft)	
0	October 5–6, 1963	Historical observations	East Rift Zone, 700 to 840 m (2,300 to 2,760 ft)	
0	August 21–23, 1963	Historical observations	East Rift Zone, 825 to 960 m (2,707 to 3,150 ft)	
0	December 7–9, 1962	Historical observations	East Rift Zone, 945 to 990 m (3,100 to 3,248 ft)	
1	September 22–24, 1961	Historical observations	East Rift Zone, 395 to 790 m (1,296 to 2,592 ft)	
1	July 10–17, 1961	Historical observations	Halemaʻumaʻu	
1	March 3–25, 1961	Historical observations	Halemaʻumaʻu	
1	February 24, 1961	Historical observations	Halemaʻumaʻu	
2	January 13 – February 19, 1960	Historical observations	East Rift Zone (near Kapoho Crater), 30 m (98 ft)	
2	November 14 – December 19, 1959	Historical observations	Kīlauea Iki	
0	February 28 – May 26, 1955	Historical observations	Lower East Rift Zone, 50 to 400 m (160 to 1,310 ft)	
0	May 31 – June 3, 1954	Historical observations	Halemaʻumaʻu and Kīlauea Caldera	
0	June 27 – November 10, 1952	Historical observations	Halemaʻumaʻu	
0	September 6 – October 8, 1934	Historical observations	Halemaʻumaʻu	
0	December 23, 1931 – January 5, 1932	Historical observations	Halemaʻumaʻu	
0	November 19 – December 7, 1930	Historical observations	Halemaʻumaʻu	
0	July 25–28, 1929	Historical observations	Halemaʻumaʻu	
0	February 20–21, 1929	Historical observations	Halemaʻumaʻu	
0	July 7–20, 1927	Historical observations	Halemaʻumaʻu	
0	July 19–29, 1924	Historical observations	Halemaʻumaʻu	
2	May 10–27, 1924	Historical observations	Halemaʻumaʻu	
0	August 25, 1923	Historical observations	East Rift Zone, 915 m (3,002 ft)	
0	May 28–30, 1922	Historical observations	East Rift Zone (Makaopuhi and Nāpau craters)	
0	March 18–25, 1921	Historical observations	Kīlauea Caldera	
0	December 21, 1919 – July 30, 1920	Historical observations	Southwest Rift Zone (Mauna Iki), 915 m (3,002 ft)	
0	February 7 – November 28, 1919	Historical observations	Kīlauea Caldera	
0	February 23 – March 9, 1918	Historical observations	Kīlauea Caldera	
0	December 2, 1906 – February 1924	Historical observations	Halemaʻumaʻu	
0	February 22, 1905 – April 1906	Historical observations	Halemaʻumaʻu	
0	November 25, 1903 – January 10, 1904	Historical observations	Halemaʻumaʻu	
0	June 3, 1902 – March 1903	Historical observations	Halemaʻumaʻu	
0	February 1902	Historical observations	Halemaʻumaʻu	
0	June 24–27, 1897	Historical observations	Halemaʻumaʻu	
0	July 11 – September 1896	Historical observations	Halemaʻumaʻu	
0	January 3–28, 1896	Historical observations	Halemaʻumaʻu	
0	January 22, 1884	Historical observations	East Rift Zone	
1	April 2, 1868 (?)	Historical observations	Southwest Rift Zone, 775 m (2,543 ft)	
0	May 30 – June 25, 1840	Historical observations	East Rift Zone, 230 to 950 m (750 to 3,120 ft)	
0	January 14, 1832	Historical observations	East rim of Kīlauea Caldera (Byron's Ledge)	
0	August 1823 (in or before) – December 6, 1894	Historical observations	Halemaʻumaʻu	
0	February – July 1823	Historical observations	Southwest Rift Zone (Great Crack), 75 to 580 m (246 to 1,903 ft)	
2	1820 (?)	Historical observations	Kīlauea Caldera	
4	November 1790 (?)	Historical observations	Kīlauea Caldera	Keanakakoi eruption
0	1790 (?)	Historical observations	Lower East Rift Zone, 230 to 375 m (755 to 1,230 ft)	
0	1750 (?)	Historical observations	East Rift Zone (Heiheiahulu), 520 m (1,710 ft)	
0	1700 ± 25 years	Magnetism	Upper East Rift Zone (Kokoolau)	
0	1650 ± 50 years	Tephrochronology	Kīlauea summit (Observatory vent)	
1	1610 ± 50 years	Radiocarbon (uncorrected)	Lower East Rift Zone (Puʻu Honuaʻula)	
0	1510 ± 50 years	Radiocarbon (uncorrected)	Lower East Rift Zone (near Kehena)	
1	1500 (?)	Radiocarbon (corrected)		
1	1490 ± 16 years	Radiocarbon (corrected)	Kīlauea Caldera	
0	1460 ± 50 years	Radiocarbon (uncorrected)	Lower East Rift Zone (near Puʻu Kaliʻu)	
0	1410 (?) – 1470 (?)	Radiocarbon (corrected)	Kīlauea summit (ʻAilāʻau shield)	ʻAilāʻau eruption
0	1340 ± 40 years	Anthropology	Upper East Rift Zone (Kāne Nui o Hamo)	
0	1140 ± 75 years	Radiocarbon (corrected)	Old Kalue flows	
1	1050 ± 75 years	Radiocarbon (uncorrected)	Lower East Rift Zone (northeast of ʻĪʻīlewa Crater)	
?	900 AD ± 50 years	Tephrochronology	Upper Kulanaokuaiki tephra	
0	850 AD ± 150 years	Radiocarbon (corrected)	Kipuka Hornet flows	
1	680 AD ± 75 years	Radiocarbon (uncorrected)	East (near Kaipu) and Southwest rift zones	
?	540 AD ± 200 years	Radiocarbon (corrected)	Kulanaokuaiki 2 tephra	
0	450 AD (in or before)	Magnetism	Lower East Rift Zone	
?	420 AD ± 20 years	Tephrochronology	Kulanaokuaiki 1 tephra	
0	150 AD ± 300 years	Magnetism	Kīlauea summit (Powers Caldera)	

== Eruptions Before the Common Era ==
Data obtained from the Global Volcanism Program website.

VEI	Date	Evidence	Activity area or unit
?	50 BCE ± 150 years	Radiocarbon (corrected)	Pre-Kulanaokuaiki tephra
0	200 BCE ± 150 years	Radiocarbon (corrected)	Kīlauea summit, East and Southwest rift zones
0	270 BCE ± 75 years	Radiocarbon (corrected)	Kipuka Nene flows
0	410 BCE ± 100 years	Radiocarbon (uncorrected)	East Rift Zone
0	800 BCE (?)	Radiocarbon (corrected)	
0	1550 BCE (?)	Radiocarbon (uncorrected)	Southwest Rift Zone
0	1650 BCE (?)	Radiocarbon (uncorrected)	Southwest Rift Zone
0	2080 BCE (?)	Radiocarbon (corrected)	
?	2200 BCE ± 500 years	Tephrochronology	
0	2850 BCE (?)	Radiocarbon (uncorrected)	Southwest Rift Zone
0	3300 BCE (?)	Radiocarbon (corrected)	
0	4650 BCE (?)	Radiocarbon (uncorrected)	Southwest Rift Zone
