= List of Mauna Loa eruptions =

This is a list of volcanic eruptions from Mauna Loa, an active shield volcano in the Hawaiian Islands that last erupted in 2022. These eruptions have taken place from the main caldera and fissures along rift zones. They are generally fluid (VEI-0) Hawaiian eruptions but more violent eruptions have occurred throughout Mauna Loa's eruptive history, with the largest recorded explosive eruptions having taken place in the 19th century.

== Historically-observed eruptions ==
Data obtained from the Global Volcanism Program website.

VEI	Start date	End date	Activity area	Eruption name
0	November 27, 2022	December 13, 2022	Mokuʻāweoweo and Northeast Rift Zone	2022 eruption of Mauna Loa
0	March 25, 1984	April 15, 1984	Mokuʻāweoweo, Southwest and Northeast rift zones	1984 eruption of Mauna Loa
0	July 5, 1975	July 6, 1975	Mokuʻāweoweo, Northeast and Southwest rift zones	1975 eruption of Mauna Loa
0	July 1, 1950	July 23, 1950	Southwest Rift Zone, 2,440 m (8,010 ft)	
0	January 6, 1949	May 31, 1949	Mokuʻāweoweo and Southwest Rift Zone	
0	April 26, 1942	May 10, 1942	Mokuʻāweoweo and Northeast Rift Zone, 2,800 m (9,200 ft)	
0	April 7, 1940	August 18, 1940	Mokuʻāweoweo and Southwest Rift Zone	
0	November 21, 1935	January 2, 1936	Mokuʻāweoweo and Northeast Rift Zone, 3,690 m (12,110 ft)	
0	December 2, 1933	December 18, 1933	Mokuʻāweoweo	
0	April 10, 1926	April 28, 1926 (?)	Southwest Rift Zone, 2,320 m (7,610 ft)	
0	September 26, 1919	November 5, 1919 (?)	Southwest Rift Zone, 3,450 and 2,350 m (11,320 and 7,710 ft)	
0	May 19, 1916	May 30, 1916	Southwest Rift Zone, 3,000 and 2,250 m (9,840 and 7,380 ft)	
0	November 25, 1914	January 11, 1915	Mokuʻāweoweo	
0	January 9, 1907	January 24, 1907 (in or after)	Mokuʻāweoweo and Southwest Rift Zone, 1,890 m (6,200 ft)	
0	September 1, 1903	December 7, 1903 (?)	Mokuʻāweoweo	
1	July 1, 1899	July 23, 1899 (?)	Mokuʻāweoweo and Northeast Rift Zone, 3,260 m (10,700 ft)	
0	April 21, 1896	May 6, 1896	Mokuʻāweoweo	
0	November 30, 1892	December 3, 1892	Mokuʻāweoweo	
0	January 16, 1887	January 28, 1887 (?)	Mokuʻāweoweo and Southwest Rift Zone, 1,740 m (5,710 ft)	
1	November 5, 1880	August 10, 1881	Northeast Rift Zone, 3,170 m (10,400 ft)	
1	May 1, 1880	May 6, 1880	Mokuʻāweoweo	
0	March 9, 1879	March 9, 1879 (?)	Mokuʻāweoweo	
0	February 14, 1877	February 24, 1877	Mokuʻāweoweo and submarine west flank	
0	February 13, 1876	February 14, 1876 (?)	Mokuʻāweoweo	
0	August 11, 1875	August 18, 1875 (?)	Mokuʻāweoweo	
0	January 10, 1875	February 9, 1875 (?)	Mokuʻāweoweo	
1	April 20, 1873	October 19, 1874 (?)	Mokuʻāweoweo	
0	January 6, 1873	January 7, 1873 (?)	Mokuʻāweoweo	
1	August 9, 1872	September 1872	Mokuʻāweoweo	
0	August 10, 1871	August 30, 1871 (?)	Mokuʻāweoweo	
2	March 27, 1868	April 22, 1868	Mokuʻāweoweo and Southwest Rift Zone, 1,000 m (3,300 ft)	
0	December 30, 1865	April 29, 1866 (?)	Mokuʻāweoweo	
1	January 23, 1859	November 25, 1859	Mokuʻāweoweo and north flank, 2,800 m (9,200 ft)	
1	August 11, 1855	November 1856	Mokuʻāweoweo and Northeast Rift Zone, 3,200 m (10,500 ft)	
2	February 17, 1852	March 11, 1852 (?)	Mokuʻāweoweo and Northeast Rift Zone, 2,560 m (8,400 ft)	
0	August 8, 1851	August 11, 1851 ± 1 days	Mokuʻāweoweo and Southwest Rift Zone	
0	May 1849	Unknown	Mokuʻāweoweo	
0	January 9, 1843	April 10, 1843 (?)	Mokuʻāweoweo, north flank and Northeast Rift Zone	
0	June 20, 1832	July 15, 1832 ± 7 days	Mokuʻāweoweo and adjacent vents	
0	1750 (?)	Unknown	North flank and Southwest Rift Zone?	

== Radiocarbon-dated eruptions ==
Data obtained from the Global Volcanism Program website.

VEI	Date	Activity area
0	1730 (?)	Northeast Rift Zone
0	1685 (?)	Northeast Rift Zone
0	1680 (?)	Northwest flank
0	1650 (?)	Northeast Rift Zone
0	1640 (?)	Northeast Rift Zone
0	1540 (?)	Northeast Rift Zone
0	1510 (?)	Northeast Rift Zone
0	1500 (?)	Northeast Rift Zone
0	1470 (?)	Northeast Rift Zone
0	1440 (?)	Northeast Rift Zone and northwest flank
0	1390 (?)	Northeast Rift Zone
0	1370 (?)	Mokuʻāweoweo and Northeast Rift Zone
0	1360 (?)	Northeast Rift Zone
0	1310 (?)	Southwest Rift Zone
0	1190 (?)	Mokuʻāweoweo and Northeast Rift Zone
0	1170 (?)	Northeast Rift Zone
0	1130 (?)	Southwest Rift Zone
0	1070 (?)	Northeast Rift Zone
0	1040 (?)	Northeast Rift Zone
0	940 AD (?)	Northeast Rift Zone
0	830 AD (?)	Mokuʻāweoweo and northwest flank
0	810 AD (?)	Mokuʻāweoweo
0	680 AD (?)	Mokuʻāweoweo
0	630 AD (?)	Northeast Rift Zone
0	600 AD (?)	Mokuʻāweoweo
0	550 AD (?)	Mokuʻāweoweo
0	480 AD (?)	Mokuʻāweoweo
0	450 AD (?)	Northeast Rift Zone
0	350 AD (?)	Mokuʻāweoweo
0	300 AD (?)	Northeast Rift Zone
0	200 AD (?)	Mokuʻāweoweo
0	150 AD (?)	Southeast Rift Zone
0	100 AD (?)	Southeast Rift Zone
0	30 BCE (?)	Northeast and Southwest rift zones
0	60 BCE (?)	Mokuʻāweoweo
0	80 BCE (?)	Southeast Rift Zone
0	200 BCE (?)	Northeast Rift Zone
0	300 BCE (?)	Northeast Rift Zone
0	400 BCE (?)	Southwest Rift Zone
0	500 BCE (?)	Southwest Rift Zone
0	600 BCE (?)	Northeast Rift Zone
0	950 BCE (?)	Mokuʻāweoweo
0	1300 BCE (?)	Mokuʻāweoweo and Northeast Rift Zone
0	1650 BCE (?)	Northeast and Southwest rift zones
0	1700 BCE (?)	Southwest Rift Zone
0	1750 BCE (?)	Northeast Rift Zone
0	1800 BCE (?)	Northwest and Southwest rift zones
0	1900 BCE (?)	Southwest Rift Zone
0	2000 BCE (?)	Southwest Rift Zone
0	2050 BCE (?)	Mokuʻāweoweo
0	2150 BCE (?)	Northeast Rift Zone
0	2250 BCE (?)	Northeast Rift Zone
0	2350 BCE (?)	Mokuʻāweoweo
0	2750 BCE (?)	Northeast and Southwest rift zones
0	3250 BCE (?)	Southwest Rift Zone
0	3350 BCE (?)	Northeast Rift Zone
0	3750 BCE (?)	Northeast Rift Zone
0	4250 BCE (?)	Southwest Rift Zone
0	5350 BCE (?)	Southwest Rift Zone
0	5650 BCE (?)	Southwest Rift Zone
0	5850 BCE (?)	Northeast and Southwest rift zones
0	6250 BCE (?)	Northeast Rift Zone
0	6550 BCE (?)	Mokuʻāweoweo
0	6650 BCE (?)	Northeast Rift Zone
0	7150 BCE (?)	Northeast and Southwest rift zones
0	7350 BCE (?)	Southwest Rift Zone
0	7550 BCE (?)	Northeast Rift Zone
0	7850 BCE (?)	Northeast Rift Zone
0	8050 BCE (?)	Northeast Rift Zone
