= VMM-266 =

Marine Medium Tiltrotor Squadron 266
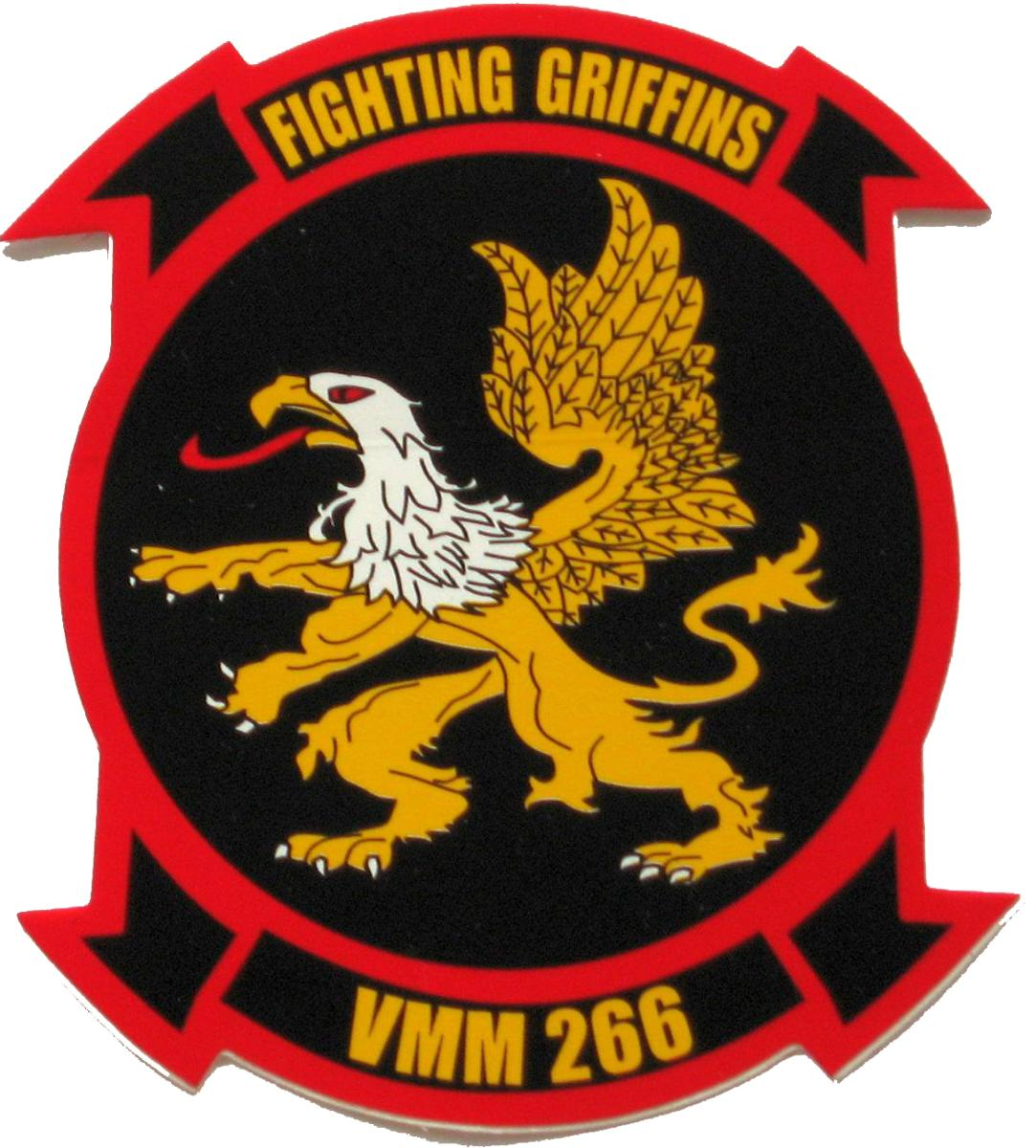
- VMM-266's unit insignia
- Active: 26 April 1983 - present
- Country: United States
- Allegiance: United States of America
- Branch: United States Marine Corps
- Type: Medium-lift Tiltrotor Squadron
- Role: Conduct air operations in support of the Fleet Marine Forces
- Part of: Marine Aircraft Group 26; 2nd Marine Aircraft Wing
- Garrison/HQ: Marine Corps Air Station New River
- Nickname: Fighting Griffins
- Tail Code: ES
- Engagements: Operation Desert Storm; Operation Allied Force; Operation Iraqi Freedom; Operation Enduring Freedom; Operation Odyssey Dawn; Operation Unified Protector

Commanders
- Current commander: LtCol John P. Skogman

Marine Medium Tiltrotor Squadron 266 (VMM-266) is a United States Marine Corps tiltrotor squadron consisting of MV-22 Osprey transport aircraft. The squadron, known as the "Fighting Griffins", is based at Marine Corps Air Station New River, North Carolina falls under the command of Marine Aircraft Group 26 (MAG-26) and the 2nd Marine Aircraft Wing (2nd MAW).

== Mission ==
Support the Marine Air Ground Task Force (MAGTF) commander by providing tactical mobility and logistical support for the MAGTF, day or night, in all weather conditions. VMM-266 does this by conducting mission essential tasks, which include shipboard operations, sea and air deployment operations, air assault, amphibious assaults and raids, distribution of supplies and other transport services, joint personnel recovery, and conduct of noncombatant evacuation.

== History ==
=== The Early years ===
HMM-266 was activated on 26 April 1983 at Marine Corps Air Station (MCAS) New River, North Carolina. In its first year, the squadron established a foundation that would make it the cold weather assault support experts for 2nd MAW. Over the course of the next six years, the squadron participated in fourteen exercises from the High Sierras of the Mountain Warfare Training Center (MWTC) in Bridgeport, California to the arctic climes of northern Norway.

=== The Gulf War and the 1990s ===
Following the invasion of Kuwait in August 1990, HMM-266 initially provided aircraft and personnel to other MAG-26 squadrons as they prepared for deployment. On 31 December 1990, HMM-266 became the first CH-46E squadron from II Marine Expeditionary Force (II MEF) to deploy to Southwest Asia (SWA). On 4 January 1991, the squadron arrived in Jubail, Saudi Arabia, and provided assault support in the form of Tactical Recovery of Aircraft and Personnel (TRAP), troop movement, casualty evacuation (CASEVAC), and re-supply missions. The squadron moved to Combat Outpost Lonesome Dove with the rest of MAG-26 for Operation Desert Storm and conducted combat support from this location until offensive operations ceased on 28 February 1991. In May, the Fighting Griffins were the last MAG-26 squadron to return to MCAS New River.

In 1992, while off the coast of Italy, the CH-46s of HMM-266 (Rein) made worldwide news when they provided heavy-lift support during the eruption of Mount Etna. Lava flows threatened to destroy the town of Zafferana Etnea, and the unit participated in Operation Hot Rock, a joint U.S.–Italian mission to divert the lava and protect the community.

In February - March 1994, the squadron supported Operation Continue Hope and Operation Quick Draw in Somalia. After successfully completing these operations, the Fighting Griffins proceeded to the Adriatic Sea in support of Operation Provide Promise and Operation Deny Flight. HMM-266 (Rein) returned to MCAS New River on 23 June, and ten days later was recalled to deploy to the Caribbean in support of Operation Uphold Democracy in Haiti.

The squadron deployed in November 1998 and immediately detached three CH-46Es and its two UH-1Ns to conduct contingency operations off the coast of Albania concurrent with Operation Silver Knight.

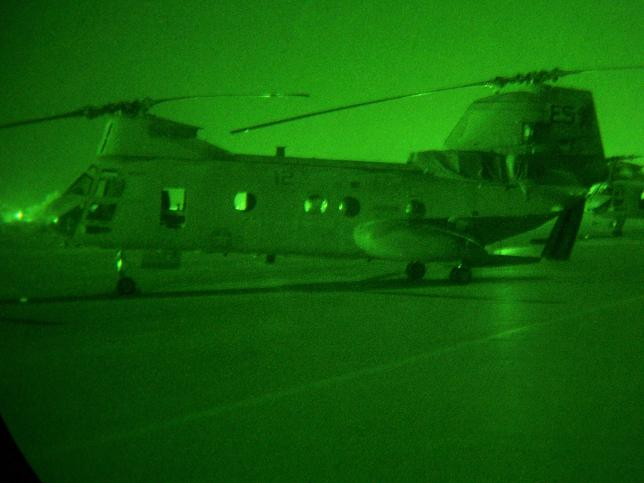
HMM-266 aircraft on flightline at Al Asad as seen on NVGs

In March 1999, the Fighting Griffins were designated the TRAP stand-by force in support of Operation Allied Force and Joint Task Force (JTF) Noble Anvil strike missions into Serbia. Upon arriving on station, the Combined Air Operations Center (CAOC) assigned the aviation combat element (ACE) AV-8Bs six excess combat strike sorties per day. The AV-8Bs flew their first combat sortie on 14 April with strike missions into Kosovo. A total of thirty four combat sorties and 65.3 combat hours were flown in support of Operation Allied Force/JTF Noble Anvil. In addition to AV-8B strike missions, two CH-46Es successfully extracted a Navy Special Warfare Team Personal Security Force from Petrovic, Macedonia.

=== Global War on Terror ===
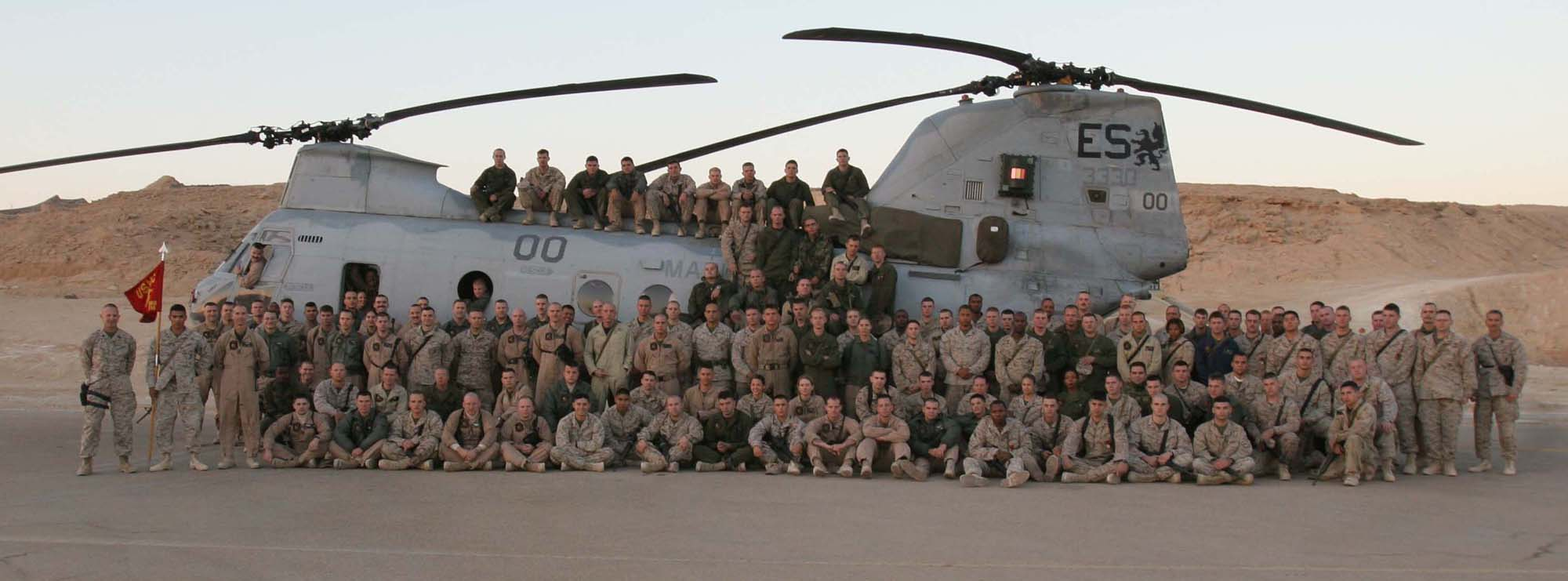
HMM-266 Squadron Photo taken 1 November 2005 at Al-Asad Iraq

In February 2004, the HMM-266 (Rein) boarded the USS Wasp and sailed east for the Mediterranean Sea. They passed through the Suez Canal and debarked in April to establish a base of operations in Kandahar, Afghanistan to participate in Operation Asbury Park. Operation Asbury Park was extended one month, and HMM-266 (Rein) ceased combat operations on 10 July, returning home on 16 September 2004.

On 7 August 2005, the Fighting Griffins deployed to Al Asad, Iraq to support Operation Iraqi Freedom. The Fighting Griffins assumed the mission of medium lift assault support from HMM-264 at 0700HRS on 20 August 2005.

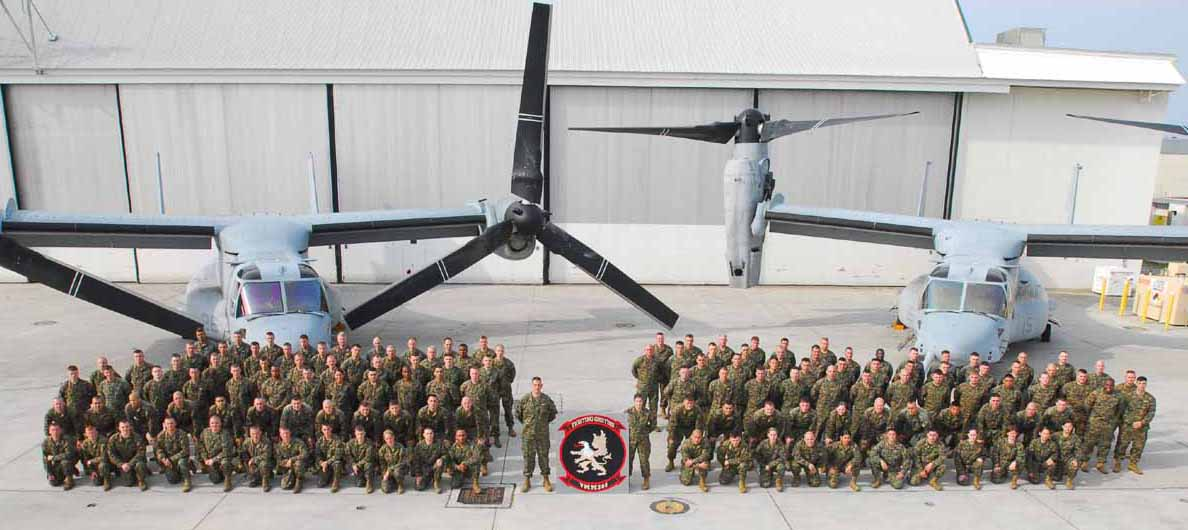
VMM-266 plank owners

The squadron stood down as Marine Medium Helicopter 266 on 15 June 2006, as a CH-46E squadron and stood up as Marine Medium Tiltrotor Squadron 266 (VMM-266) on 23 March 2007. After VMM-263 and VMM-162, VMM-266 became the third operational Osprey unit of the Marine Corps. In September 2008, the squadron again deployed to Al Asad Airbase to support OIF.

=== 2020’s ===
In late 2020, VMM-266 deployed to Spain in support of the North African Response Force, or NARF.

In 2022, VMM-266 (REIN) deployed to Djibouti, Africa in support of Crisis Response Force Africa (CR-AF).

== See also ==
- United States Marine Corps Aviation
- Organization of the United States Marine Corps
- List of United States Marine Corps aircraft squadrons
