= List of Mount Etna eruptions =

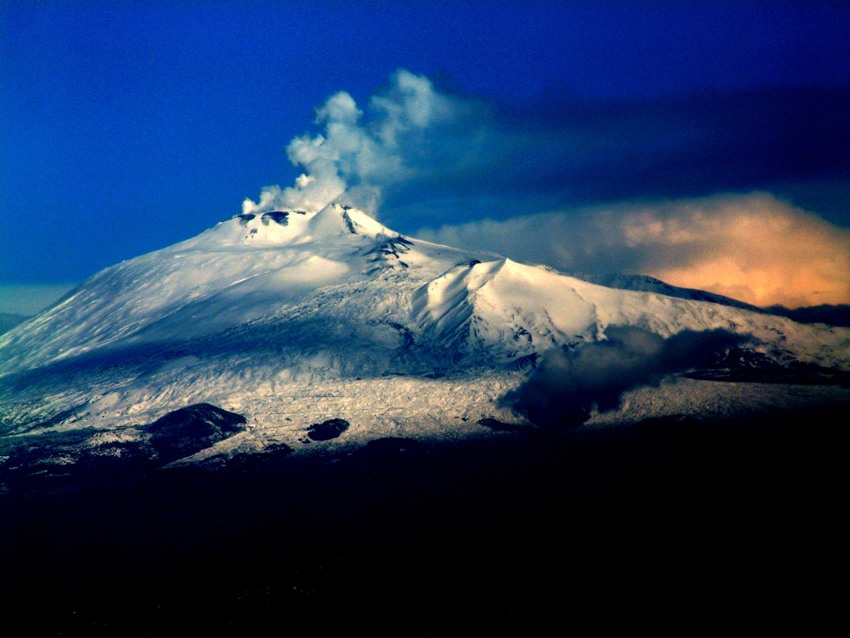
Mount Etna viewed from the southwest

This is a list of volcanic eruptions from Mount Etna, an active stratovolcano on the Italian island of Sicily that is currently erupting. These eruptions have taken place from summit craters and flank vents, the latter of which are less frequently active, but typically issue volcanic material at higher rates. The earliest reported eruption took place in 1500 BCE, making volcanism at Mount Etna one of the longest documented on Earth. Most of the documented eruptions from Mount Etna have ranked 1–3 on the Volcanic Explosivity Index, but infrequent VEI-0, VEI-4 and VEI-5 eruptions have also been recorded since 1500 BCE.

== Eruptions during the Common Era ==
Data obtained from the Global Volcanism Program website.

VEI	Date	Evidence	Activity area or unit
2	December 23, 2024 – Ongoing	Reported, seismicity	Southeast Crater, Bocca Nuova
3	September 3, 2013 – June 17, 2022	Reported	Southeast Crater, New Southeast Crater, Northeast Crater, Bocca Nuova, Voragine Crater, Saddle Cone, Cono della Sella
3	August 25, 2010 – April 27, 2013	Reported	Bocca Nuova, Northeast Crater, New Southeast Crater, Voragine Crater
1	April 8, 2010	Reported	Southeast Crater
2	March 19, 2007 – July 4, 2009	Reported	Bocca Nuova, Southeast Crater, flank vents
2	July 14 – December 15, 2006	Reported	Southeast Crater, Northeast Crater, flank vents
1	December 16–22, 2005	Reported	Bocca Nuova
1	September 7, 2004 – March 8, 2005	Reported	Southeast Crater, southeast flank
1 (?)	February 12–14, 2004	Reported	Central Crater
3	December 16 (?), 2001 ± 15 days – November 9, 2003	Reported	Central Crater, Northeast Crater, south flank, northeast rift
3	June 17, 1994 – August 19, 2001	Reported	Central Crater, Northeast Crater, Southeast Crater, south to northeast flanks
1	August 3 – October 3, 1993	Reported	Central Crater, Northeast Crater
3 (?)	July 3, 1979 – March 30, 1993	Reported	Central Crater, Southeast Crater, Northeast Crater, Valle del Bove, east flank, northeast flank, southeast flank, north-northwest flank, south flank
2	September 19, 1971 – March 16 (?), 1979	Reported	Central Crater, Southeast Crater, Northeast Crater, west flank, north flank, southeast flank, east-northeast flank
2	January 10, 1966 – June 12, 1971	Reported	Northeast Crater, Central Crater, southeast flank
3	October 7, 1959 – December 31, 1964	Reported	Central Crater, Northeast Crater, north-northeast flank
1	March 23 – April 25, 1959	Reported	Central Crater
1	November 16, 1958 ± 15 days – December 16, 1958 ± 15 days	Reported	Central Crater, Northeast Crater
2	August 25, 1957 – May 3, 1958	Reported	Northeast Crater
2	February 5 – May 7, 1957	Reported	Northeast Crater
2	April 5, 1955 – April 7, 1956	Reported	Central Crater, Northeast Crater
2	December 2, 1949 – May 30, 1952	Reported	Central Crater, Northeast Crater, east flank, northwest flank
3 (?)	January 29 – March 10, 1947	Reported	Central Crater, Northeast Crater, northeast flank
1	February – October 1946	Reported	Northeast Crater
1	June 5 ± 4 days – October 1945	Reported	Northeast Crater
2	October (?) 1941 – April 26, 1944 ± 4 days	Reported	Central Crater, Northeast Crater, southwest flank
3	July 7, 1935 – January 27 (?), 1941	Reported	Central Crater, Northeast Crater
1	January 5 – March 1934	Reported	Northeast Crater
2	July 26, 1931 ± 5 days – September 1933	Reported	Central Crater, Northeast Crater
1	November 1, 1930	Reported	Northeast Crater
1	August 2, 1929	Reported	Northeast Crater
1	July 31 – November 20, 1928	Reported	Central Crater, Northeast Crater, east flank
1	January 2 – June 1926	Reported	Northeast Crater
2	March 15, 1919 – February 1925	Reported	Central Crater, Northeast Crater, northeast flank
2	March – December 1 (?), 1918	Reported	Central Crater, Northeast Crater, north flank
2	June 24 – July 5, 1917 ± 4 days	Reported	Central Crater, Northeast Crater
2	November 13, 1913 – March 1917	Reported	Central Crater, Northeast Crater
3	August 1912	Reported	Central Crater
2	August – September 26, 1911 ± 4 days	Reported	Central Crater, Northeast Crater (?), northeast flank
2	December 27, 1910 – February 17, 1911	Reported	Central Crater
2	February 21 – April 18, 1910	Reported	Central Crater, south flank
2	April 29, 1908 – September 28, 1909	Reported	Central Crater, southeast flank (Valle del Bove)
2	November 15, 1899 – August 1907	Reported	
3	July 19 – August 5, 1899	Reported	Central Crater
1	April 26, 1893 – June 1898	Reported	Central Crater
2	June 20 – December 29, 1892	Reported	Central Crater, south flank, Mount Silvestri
2	February 20 – December 1891	Reported	Central Crater
2	May – October 17 (?), 1890	Reported	Central Crater
2	April 13 (on or before), 1888 – August 1889	Reported	Central Crater
1	May 31 – August 1887	Reported	Central Crater
3	1884 – June 7, 1886	Reported	Central Crater, south flank (Mount Gemmellaro)
3	December 23, 1878 – March 31 (on or before), 1883	Reported	Central Crater, south-southwest flank, north-northeast flank, south flank (Mount Leone)
2	August 29–31, 1874	Reported	Central Crater, north flank
2	May 1874	Reported	Central Crater
0	September 26, 1869	Reported	East flank (west wall of Valle del Bove)
3	November 26 (?) – December 8, 1868	Reported	Central Crater
2	January 30 – June 28, 1865	Reported	Northeast flank (Mount Sartorius)
2	August 5 ± 4 days – September 19, 1864	Reported	Central Crater
3 (?)	May 1, 1863 – July 25 (?), 1863	Reported	Central Crater
2	August 20, 1852 – May 27, 1853	Reported	East flank (Valle del Bove)
2	November 17 – December 16 (?), 1843	Reported	Central Crater, west flank
2	November 18 – December 29 (?), 1842	Reported	Central Crater
2	July 8, 1838 – February 1839	Reported	Central Crater
2	October 31 – November 22, 1832	Reported	South-southeast flank, west flank, Mount Nunziata
2	December (?) 1820 – 1833	Reported	Central Crater
2 (?)	May 27 – August 5, 1819	Reported	Central Crater, Valle del Bove
2	October 27, 1811 – May (?) 1812	Reported	East flank (Valle del Bove)
2	March 27 – April 9, 1809	Reported	Central Crater, north flank, northeast flank
2	January 1, 1803 – 1819 (?)	Reported	Central Crater
2	November 15–18, 1802	Reported	Central Crater, east flank
3 (?)	1793 (?) – 1802 (?)	Reported	Central Crater
3	March 1792 – May 26, 1793 ± 5 days	Reported	Central Crater, west flank, southeast flank
2	February – September 1791	Reported	Central Crater
4	June 4 ± 4 days – August 11, 1787	Reported	Central Crater
2	March – May 10, 1781	Reported	Central Crater
2	April 20 (?) – July (?) 1780	Reported	Summit, south flank, south-southwest flank
?	1776	Reported	Central Crater
?	May 2, 1767	Reported	Central Crater
2	April 27 – November 6, 1766	Reported	South flank (Mount Calcarazzi)
3	December 9, 1732 – 1765	Reported	Central Crater, east flank (Valle del Bove), west flank (Mount Nuovo), south flank (Montagnola), northwest flank
2 (?)	November 22, 1727 – May 10 (?), 1728	Reported	Central Crater
1	March 8 – May 8, 1702	Reported	East flank (Valle del Bove)
3 (?)	December 1693 – November (?) 1694	Reported	Central Crater
1	March 14, 1689	Reported	East flank (Valle del Bove)
1	1688	Reported	Central Crater
2	September 1 – October (?), 1682	Reported	East flank (Valle del Bove)
3 (?)	March 11 – July 11 (?), 1669	Reported	South flank (Monti Rossi)
1	January 1, 1654 – 1656 (?)	Reported	Central Crater
1	January 17, 1651 – July (?) 1653	Reported	West flank, east flank
2	November 20, 1646 – January 17, 1647	Reported	North-northeast flank, Mount Nero
1	February 20–28, 1643	Reported	North flank, Monte Pomiciaro
1	December 19 (?), 1634 – April 27, 1638	Reported	Southeast flank, Little Mount Pecorara
2 (?)	July 1 (?), 1614 – 1624	Reported	North-northeast flank, Monti Deserti
2	February 6 – August 15, 1610	Reported	Southwest flank
2	June 28, 1607 – 1608 (?)	Reported	Southwest flank
2	July 1603 – 1610	Reported	Central Crater
?	September 9 (?), 1579 – 1580 (?)	Reported	Southeast flank
2	November 1 (?) – December 1566	Reported	Northeast flank
2	July (?) 1541	Reported	
1	July 1540	Reported	
2	March (?) – July 1537	Reported	Summit, south flank
3	March 22 – December (?) 1536	Reported	Summit, south flank, north flank, west flank
1	1493 (?) – 1500 (?)	Reported	
1	September 21, 1447	Reported	
1	September 25, 1446	Reported	East flank (Valle del Bove)
2	1444	Reported	South flank (north of Mount Arso)
3	November 8–25 (?), 1408	Reported	Summit, south flank (Mount Piniteddu)
2	August 5 (?), 1381 ± 1 days	Reported	South-southeast flank, Mount Pomiciari, Mount Arsi?
2	1350	Reported	
2	1333	Reported	
3 (?)	June 28 – August 4, 1329 ± 4 days	Reported	Southeast flank
?	1284 – January (?) 1285	Reported	East flank (Valle del Bove)
2 (?)	1250	Reported	
?	August (?) 1224	Reported	Southeast flank
2 (?)	1194	Reported	
2 (?)	1164 (?)	Reported	
2 (?)	1160	Reported	
2 (?)	1157	Reported	
?	1063 ± 1 years	Reported	
?	0417 (?)	Reported	
3 (?)	February 1–9, 0252	Reported	South flank (Monpeloso)
?	0100 ± 100 years	Tephrochronology	FV tephra
?	0039 ± 1 years	Reported	
?	0010 (?) – 0020 (?)	Reported	

== Eruptions Before the Common Era ==
Data obtained from the Global Volcanism Program website.

VEI	Date	Evidence	Activity area or unit
?	31 December 32 BCE ± 365 days	Reported	
?	15 July 36 BCE ± 45 days – 35 BCE	Reported	East flank?
3 (?)	March 44 BCE (?)	Reported	FF tephra layer
?	49 BCE	Reported	Summit and west flank?
5	122 BCE	Reported	Summit (Cratere del Piano caldera) and south flank
?	June 0126 BCE (on or before)	Reported	
?	0135 BCE	Reported	
?	December 31, 0141 BCE ± 365 days	Reported	
?	April 15, 0396 BCE (?) ± 45 days	Reported	Southeast flank (Monte Gorna)
?	March 15, 0425 BCE ± 15 days – 0424 BCE (?)	Reported	South flank (Monte Arso)
?	August 0479 BCE (?) – 0475 BCE (?)	Reported	South flank?
?	0695 BCE ± 2 years	Reported	South flank? Mount Mompilieri?
?	1050 BCE ± 75 years	Radiocarbon dating	South flank (Monte Salto del Cane)
?	1420 BCE ± 75 years	Radiocarbon dating	FL tephra layer
5 (?)	1500 BCE ± 50 years	Reported	
?	1980 BCE ± 50 years	Radiocarbon dating	FS tephra
?	2330 BCE ± 100 years	Radiocarbon dating	
?	3050 BCE ± 150 years	Radiocarbon dating	
?	3390 BCE ± 50 years	Radiocarbon dating	Tufo varicolori tephra
?	3510 BCE ± 150 years	Radiocarbon dating	
?	4150 BCE ± 150 years	Radiocarbon dating	
?	5150 BCE ± 150 years	Radiocarbon dating	
?	6190 BCE ± 200 years	Radiocarbon dating	

== Discredited eruptions ==
Data obtained from the Global Volcanism Program website.

Date
May 27, 1911
1640
July 1609
1595
1550
1535
1533
1470
1334
1321 – 1328
1222
1175
0604
0560
0500
0410
0400
0165
0072
0050
0350 BCE (?)
1470 BCE

== Uncertain eruptions ==
Data obtained from the Global Volcanism Program website.

Date	Activity area
July 30, 1953	
September 6, 1857	Central Crater
March 6, 1816	Offshore from Aci-Castello
May 8, 1770 ± 1 days	Central Crater
November 22, 1723 – May 1724 (?)	
January 9, 1693	
February 21, 1633	Central Crater
1578	
1554	
February 4, 1169	
1044	
0911	
0859	
0814	
0812 (?)	South flank (south of Mount Sona)
0644	
0080 (?)	
0010 BCE (?)	
0056 BCE	
0061 BCE	
0565 BCE	
0735 BCE	
