= List of Hawaii state parks =

The following 18 or more state parks, monuments, and recreation areas are managed by the Division of State Parks within the Hawai'i Department of Land and Natural Resources:

Hawaii State Parks

== Hawaiʻi (island) ==
- ʻAkaka Falls State Park
- Hapuna Beach State Recreation Area
- Huliheʻe Palace
- Kalopa State Recreation Area
- Kealakekua Bay State Historical Park
- Kekaha Kai (Kona Coast) State Park
- Kīholo State Park Reserve
- Kohala Historical Sites State Monument
- Lapakahi State Historical Park
- Lava Tree State Monument
- MacKenzie State Recreation Area
- Manuka State Wayside Park
- Mauna Kea Ice Age Reserve
- Mauna Kea State Recreation Area
- Old Kona Airport State Recreation Area
- Wailoa River State Recreation Area
- Wailuku River State Park / Rainbow Falls

== Kauaʻi ==
- Ahukini State Recreation Pier
- Haʻena State Park
- Kōkeʻe State Park
- Nā Pali Coast State Park
- Polihale State Park
- Russian Fort Elizabeth State Historical Park
- Wailua River State Park
- Waimea Canyon State Park
- Waimea State Recreational Pier

== Maui ==
- Halekiʻi-Pihana Heiau State Monument
- ʻĪao Valley State Monument
- Kaumahina State Wayside Park
- Makena State Park
- Polipoli Spring State Recreation Area
- Puaʻa Kaʻa State Wayside Park
- Waiʻanapanapa State Park
- Wailua Valley State Wayside Park

== Moloka‘i ==
- Palaʻau State Park

== Oʻahu ==
- Ahupuaʻa O Kahana State Park
- ʻAiea Bay State Recreation Area
- Diamond Head State Monument
- Hanauma Bay Nature Preserve
- Heʻeia State Park
- ʻIolani Palace State Monument
- Kaʻena Point State Park
- Kaiwi State Scenic Shoreline
- Kakaʻako Waterfront Park
- Keaīwa Heiau State Recreation Area
- Kewalo Basin
- Kukaniloko Birthstones State Monument
- Lāʻie Point State Wayside
- Makapuʻu Point State Wayside
- Mālaekahana State Recreation Area
- Nuʻuanu Pali State Wayside
- Puʻu o Mahuka Heiau State Monument
- Puʻu ʻUalakaʻa State Wayside
- Queen Emma Summer Palace
- Royal Mausoleum State Monument
- Sacred Falls State Park
- Sand Island State Recreation Area
- Ulupō Heiau State Historic Site
- Waʻahila Ridge State Recreation Area
- Wahiawā Freshwater State Recreation Area

== See also ==
- Civilian Conservation Corps Camp in Kokeʻe State Park
- Natural Area Reserves System Hawaii
