= MacKenzie State Recreation Area =

Coordinates: 19°26′21″N 154°51′51″W

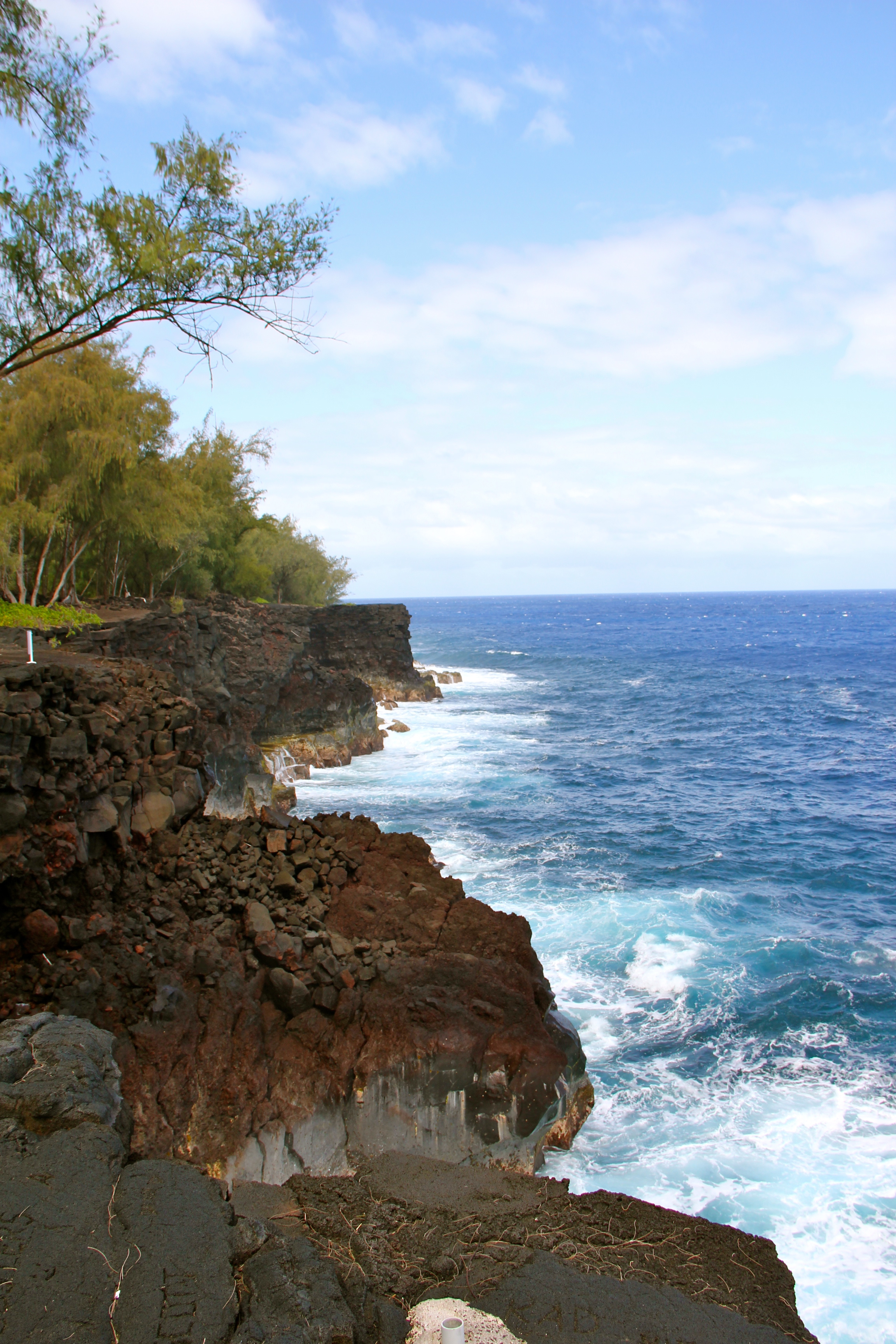
Lava cliff in MacKenzie State Park, Hawai‘i

The MacKenzie State Recreation Area is a park in southern Puna, on Hawaiʻi Island in the US state of Hawaii.

== Description ==
At only 13 acres (0.053 km^{2}), it is a small park that is only open during the daytime. It provides picnicking facilities and restrooms, but there is no drinking water. Fishing is allowed but swimming is discouraged due to the rocky shore and cliffs and strong currents. A hiking trail follows the old Hawaiian coastal path, "the King's Highway", and passes the mouths of lava tubes. The park contains the largest grove of ironwood trees in Hawaii which were planted in the 1930s by ranger Albert J. MacKenzie, who after his death in 1938, after 21 years of service as a ranger, became the namesake of the park. The park is considered part of the Malama Ki Forest Reserve.

== 2018 lava flow ==
The park was closed to the public in May 2018 due to a flank eruption of Kīlauea when lava flows erupting in lower Puna approached the park and entered the ocean at two locations nearby.

== See also ==
- List of Hawaii state parks
