= Keaīwa Heiau State Recreation Area =

Ruins of a temple at Aiea Heights on Oahu, Hawaii, United States

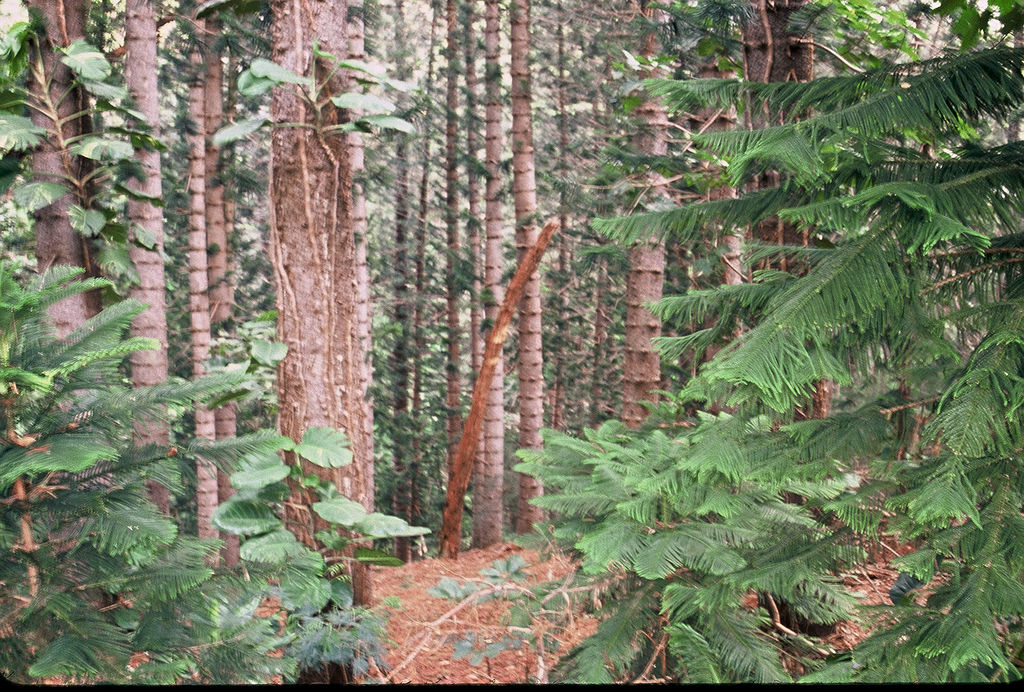

- Location within Hawaii
- Nearest city: Aiea, Hawaii
- Coordinates: 21°24′08″N 157°53′59″W
- Area: 384 acres (155 ha)
- Governing body: Hawaii State Parks Division

Keaīwa Heiau State Recreation Area is the ruins of a temple (Heiau in the Hawaiian language) at the summit of a hill and neighborhood called ʻAiea Heights on Oʻahu, Hawaiʻi. The recreation area includes camping facilities and a 4.8-mile (7.7 km) trail. It also offers clear views of Pearl Harbor. The high point of Puu Uau is about halfway down the trail, where native ohia lehua and koa trees may be viewed. The remains of a military plane that crashed in 1944 can also be seen along the trail. The hike is not particularly difficult, however it does include one quite steep switchback stretch and can be extremely muddy if it has just rained. Allow for around 2.5 hours of easy strolling. A possible translation of Keaʻiwa would be mysterious, incomprehensible. It is believed that this name was given in reference to the healing powers of the plants that no one could really explain. In addition, Keaiwa Heiau may have also been known as a "Heiau Hoʻola," or the healing or life-giving heiau according to native Hawaiian scholar Mary Kawena Pukui.

Foresters replanted most of this area in the late 1920s. The lemon eucalyptus trees give forth a mild citrus scent in the air. The trail's lower end is marked by stands of Norfolk Island pine trees. Pu'u Uau, the trail's high point around halfway along the length, is surrounded by native koa and ohi'a trees. There is also wreckage of a B-24 aircraft that went down in 1944.

The name "Keʻaiwa" means "strange" or "incomprehensible" in Hawaiian. Perhaps the name refers to the idea that the powers of the kahuna and the plants employed in healing are unfathomable.

Erected sometime in the 16th century by Kakuhihewa, the 15th Aliʻi ʻAimoku, or ruling chief, of Oahu, the 100 feet (24 m) by 160 feet (49 m) stone temple had walls averaging 4 ft in height and 5 ft in width. The walls consisted of numerous evenly faced one foot stones that are filled with rubble. Abundant medicinal herbs in the area were used by kahuna as a type of ancient herbal clinic. The kahuna would also train haumana (students) interested in the art of laʻau lapaʻau (healing medicine). The kahuna would also train students in the practice of praying, fasting, and medicinal healing using the neighboring plants. The reputed healing powers of the surrounding plants still draws visitors who leave temple offerings, hoping to experience medicinal benefits.

Most of the trees in the area were replanted during the early 20th century. Although native species can be found at the highpoint of the trail. The remnants of a military airplane that crashed onto the area in 1993 can also be seen from the trail.

The site provides a map for the 4.5 miles (7.2 km) Aiea Loop Trail. Several varieties of trees and other vegetation are enjoyed by visitors who make the trek.

== Fees, hours, and facilities ==
Heiau State Recreation Area is free to the public.

April 1 to Labor Day: 7 am to 7:45 pm After Labor Day to March 31: 7 am to 6:45 pm

The camping and picnic areas accommodate up to 100 people and come equipped with restrooms and showers. Advance permits must be obtained for camping.

== Gallery ==
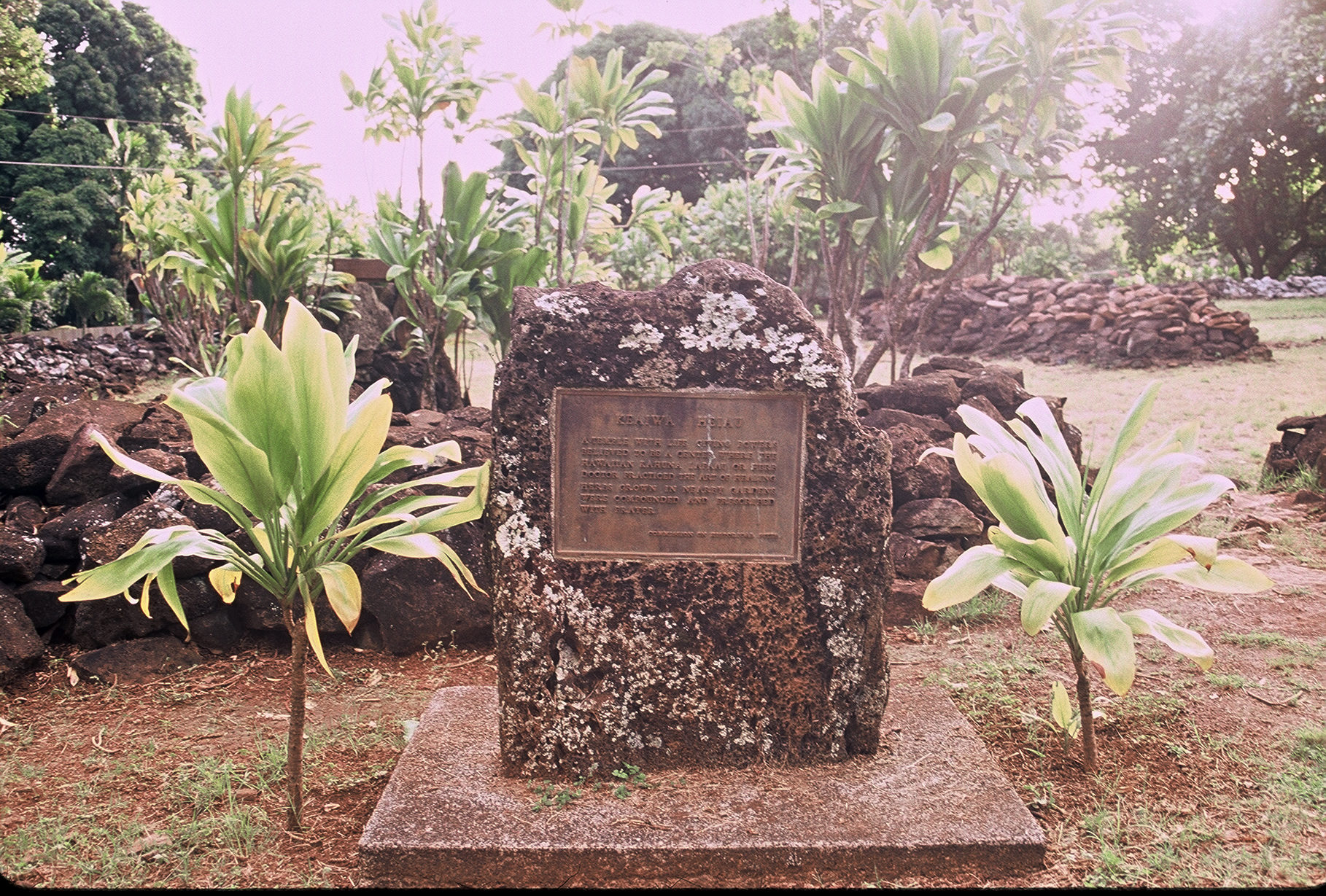
The plaque at Keaīwa Heiau

KEAIWA HEIAU
A temple with life giving powers believed to be a center where the Hawaiian kahuna lapaau or herb doctor practiced the art of healing. Herbs grown in nearby gardens were compounded and prescribed with prayer—Commission on Historical Sites

== See also ==
- Oahu
- Aiea, Hawaii
- List of Hawaii state parks
- Kahuna
