= Lava Tree State Monument =

Park in Pāhoa, Hawaii, USA

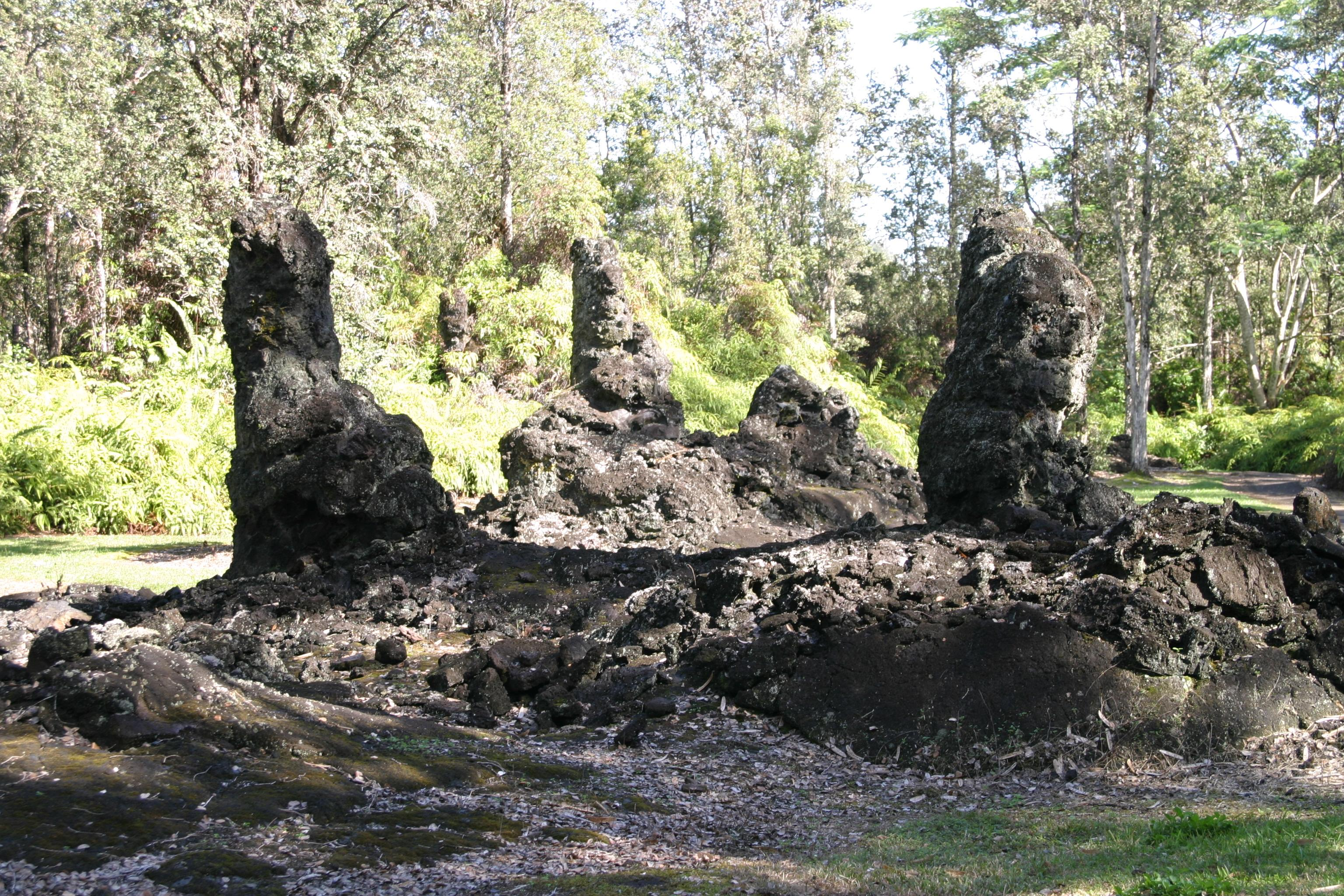
- Lava molds of tree trunks in Lava Tree State Monument

- Location within Hawaii
- Location: Pāhoa
- Coordinates: 19°29′00″N 154°54′10″W
- Governing body: State of Hawaii

Lava Tree State Monument is a public park located 2.7 miles (4.3 km) southeast of Pāhoa in the Puna District on the island of Hawaii. It preserves lava molds of the tree trunks that were formed when a lava flow swept through a forested area in 1790.

== Park Information ==
=== Features ===
A 0.7-mile (1.1 km) footpath forms a loop through the park. Like all Hawaii state parks, there is no charge for parking and entry. Facilities include restrooms, picnic tables, and 3 covered structures to provide refuge from the rain or sun. It is open daily during daylight hours only, since there are no lights on the path. No camping, and no mountain bikes are allowed in the park. There are no water fountains at the park; bring your own water. Although there is a paved path, tree roots have lifted and separated parts of the path so toddlers and the elderly may need assistance.

=== Directions ===
From the Hawaii Belt Road (State Route 11), take Highway 130, known as Keaʻau-Pāhoa Road, toward the town of Pāhoa. Bypass the first intersection that would take you into Pāhoa by staying to the left. Continue to the traffic light where Pāhoa Bypass Road, Keaʻau-Pāhoa Rd and Pāhoa-Kapoho roads meet. At this intersection, make a left onto Highway 132, Pāhoa-Kapoho Road. Continue for about 3 miles (4.8 km) to Lava Tree Road on your left. The park is located on your right, about 150 feet (46 m) down Lava Tree Road.

=== History ===
The land was once part of the extensive ranch of William Herbert Shipman. Although ancient Hawaiians knew the molds were from a lava flow, one of the first to propose that they were from former trees was Rufus Anderson Lyman.

It was closed in May 2018 due to the eruption of Kīlauea when lava flows approached the park.

== Gallery ==
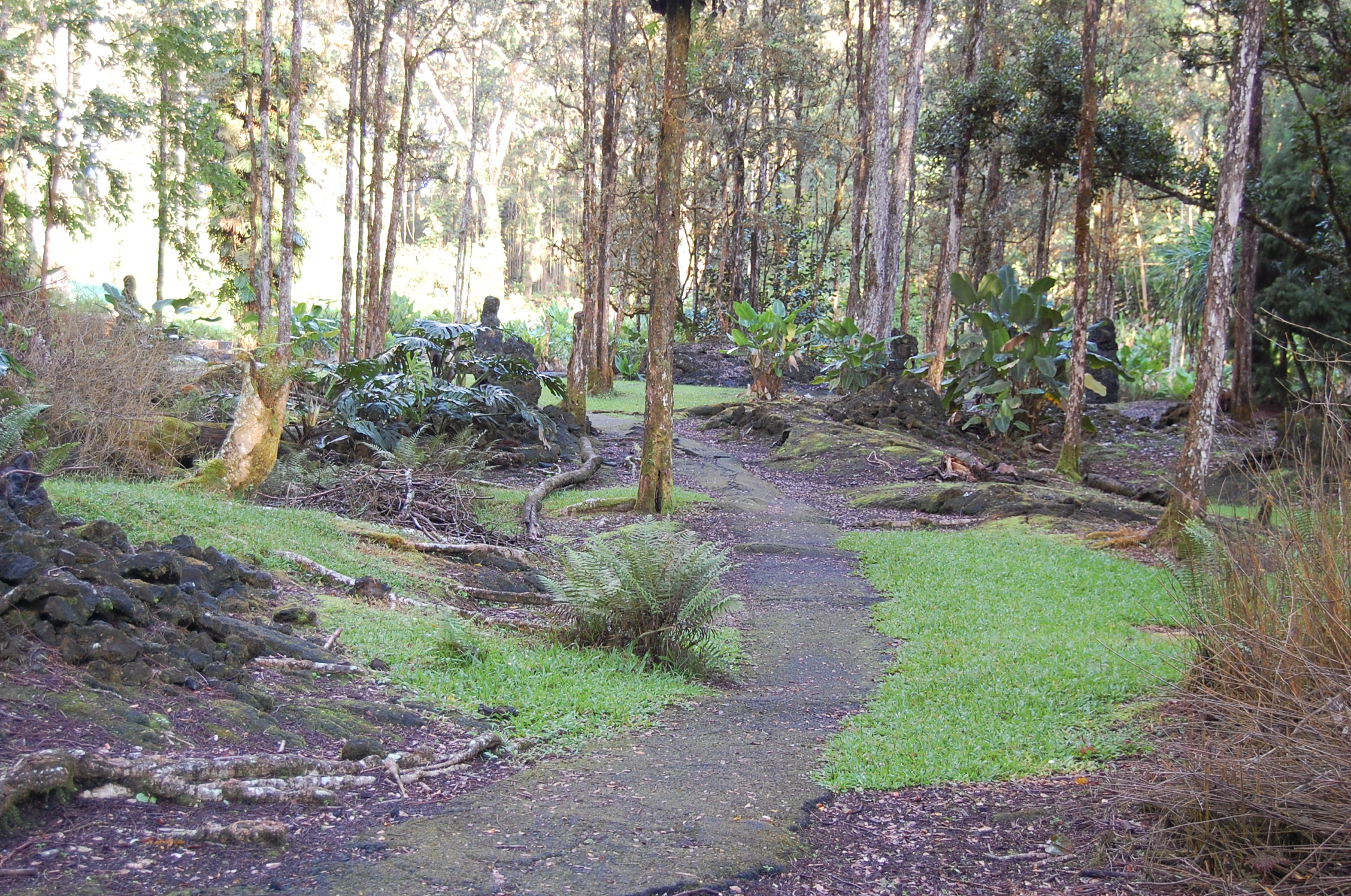
Path

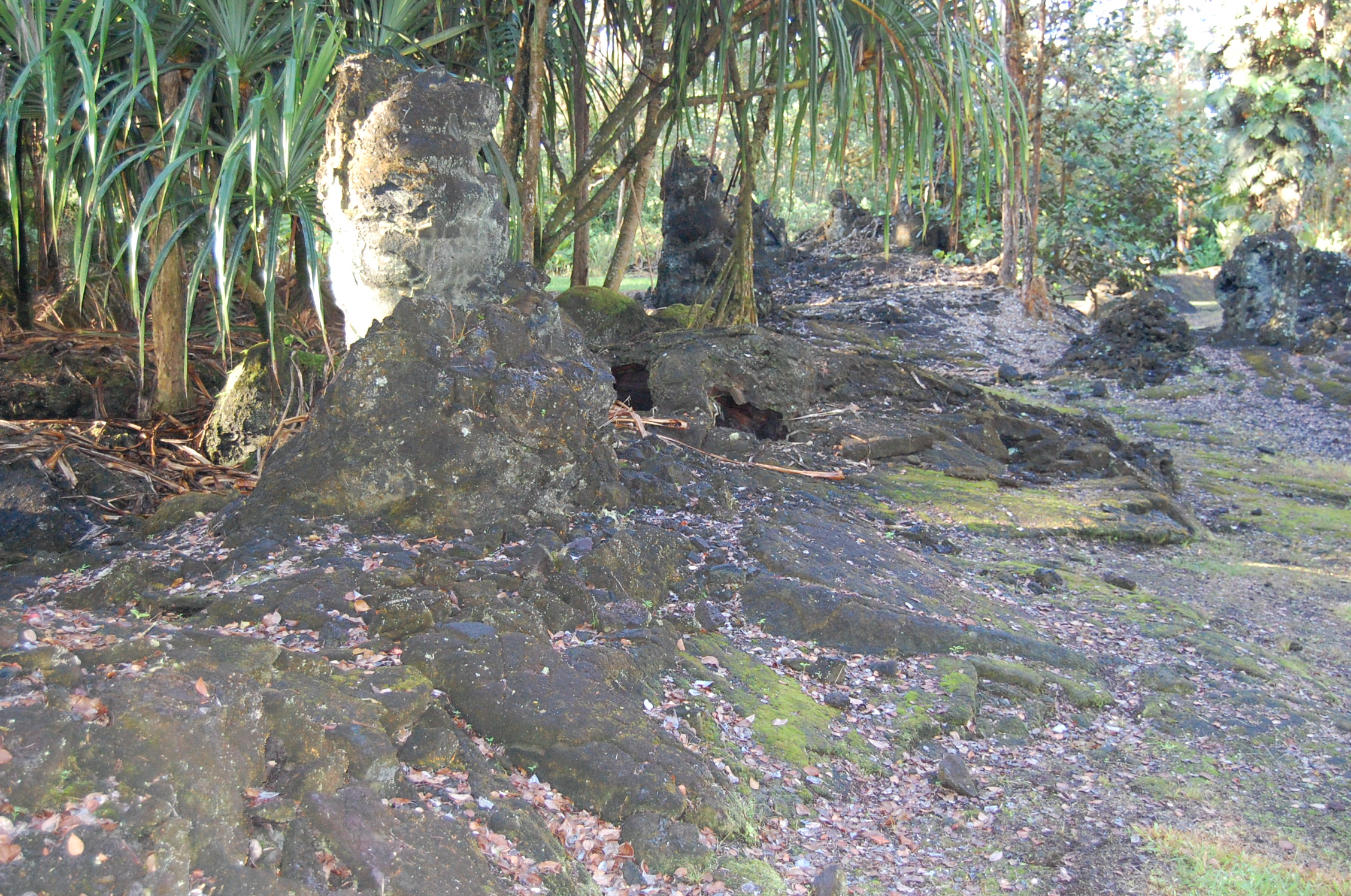
Lava Trees

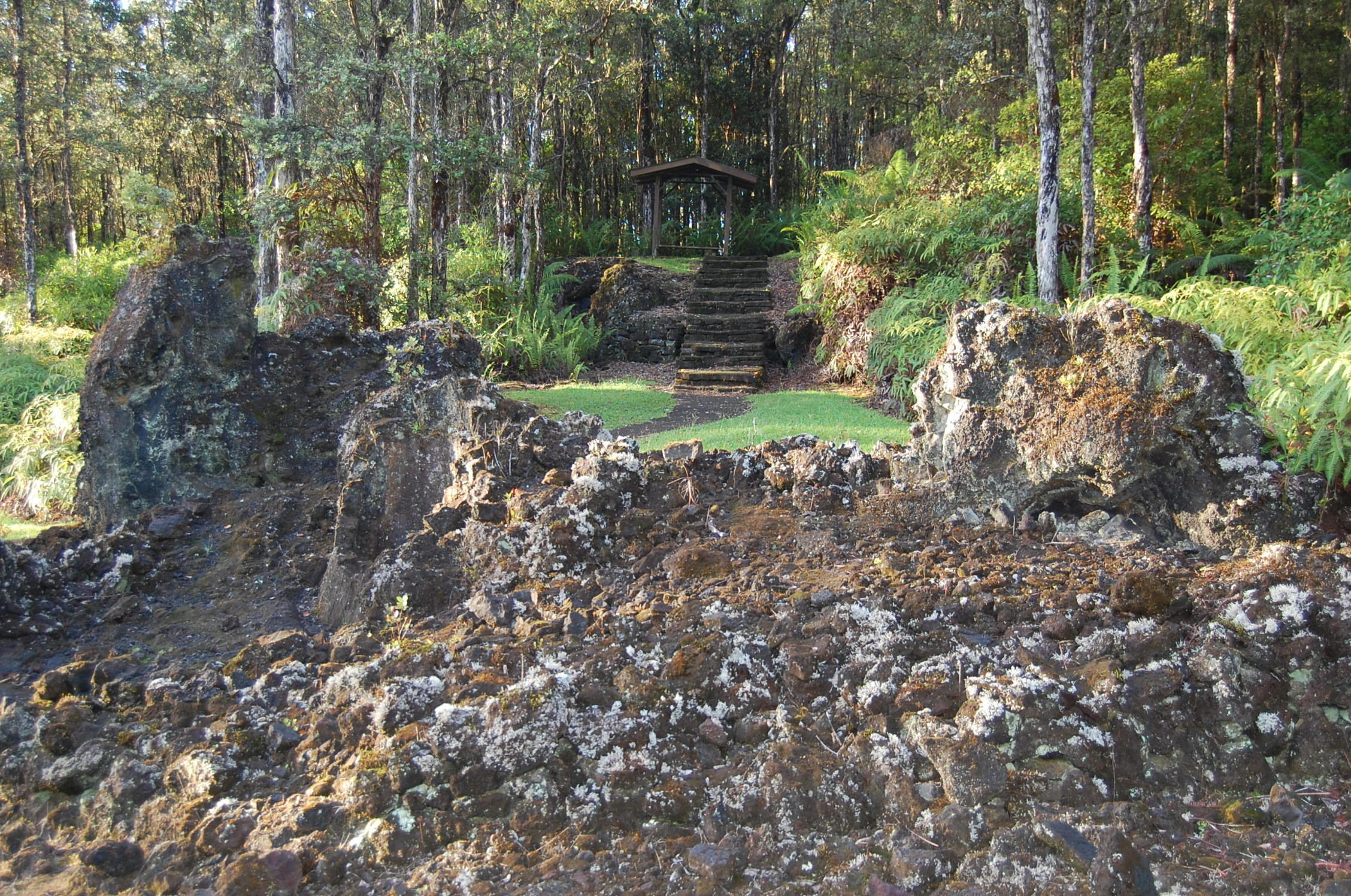
Shelter

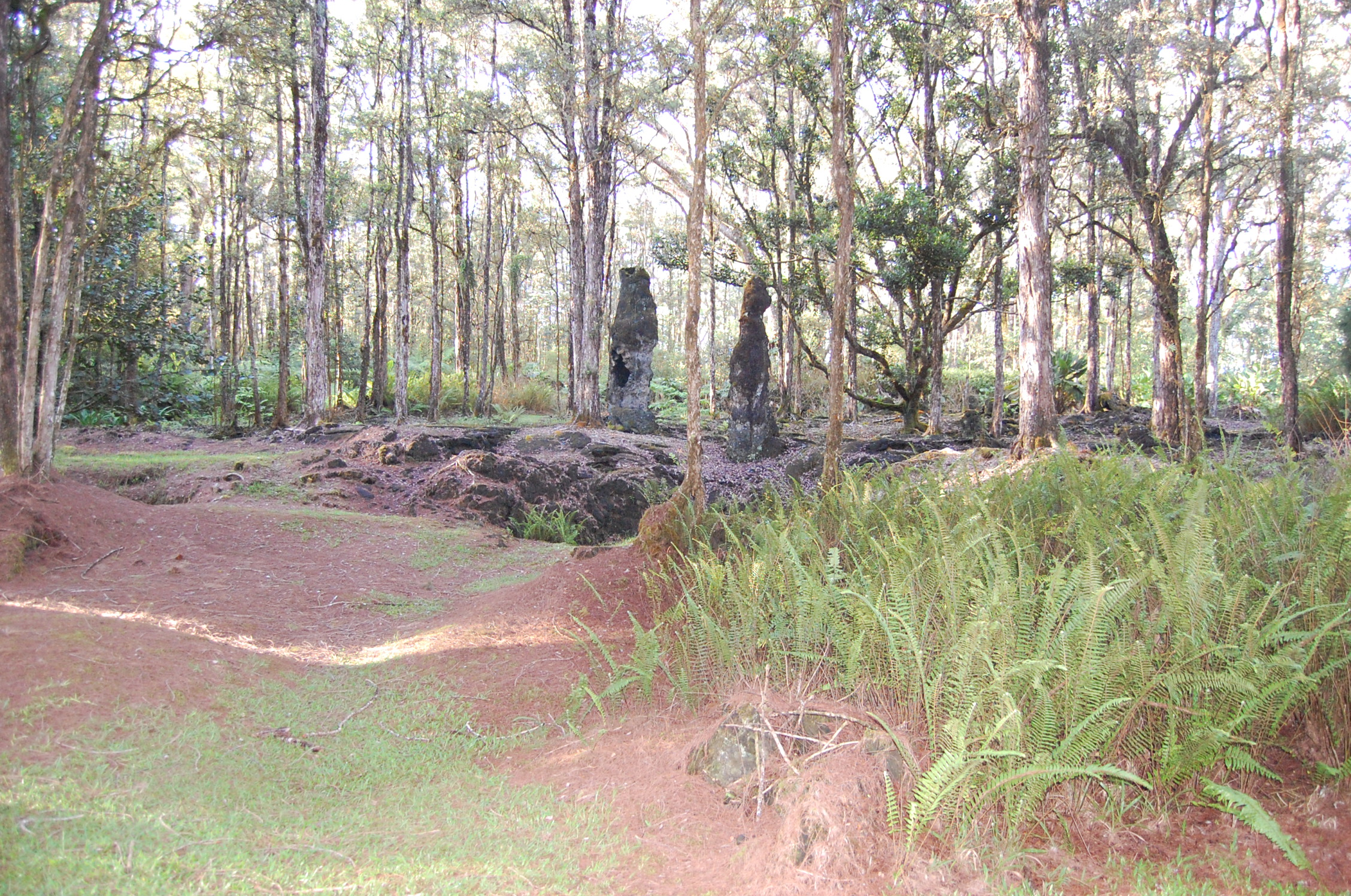
Lava Trees

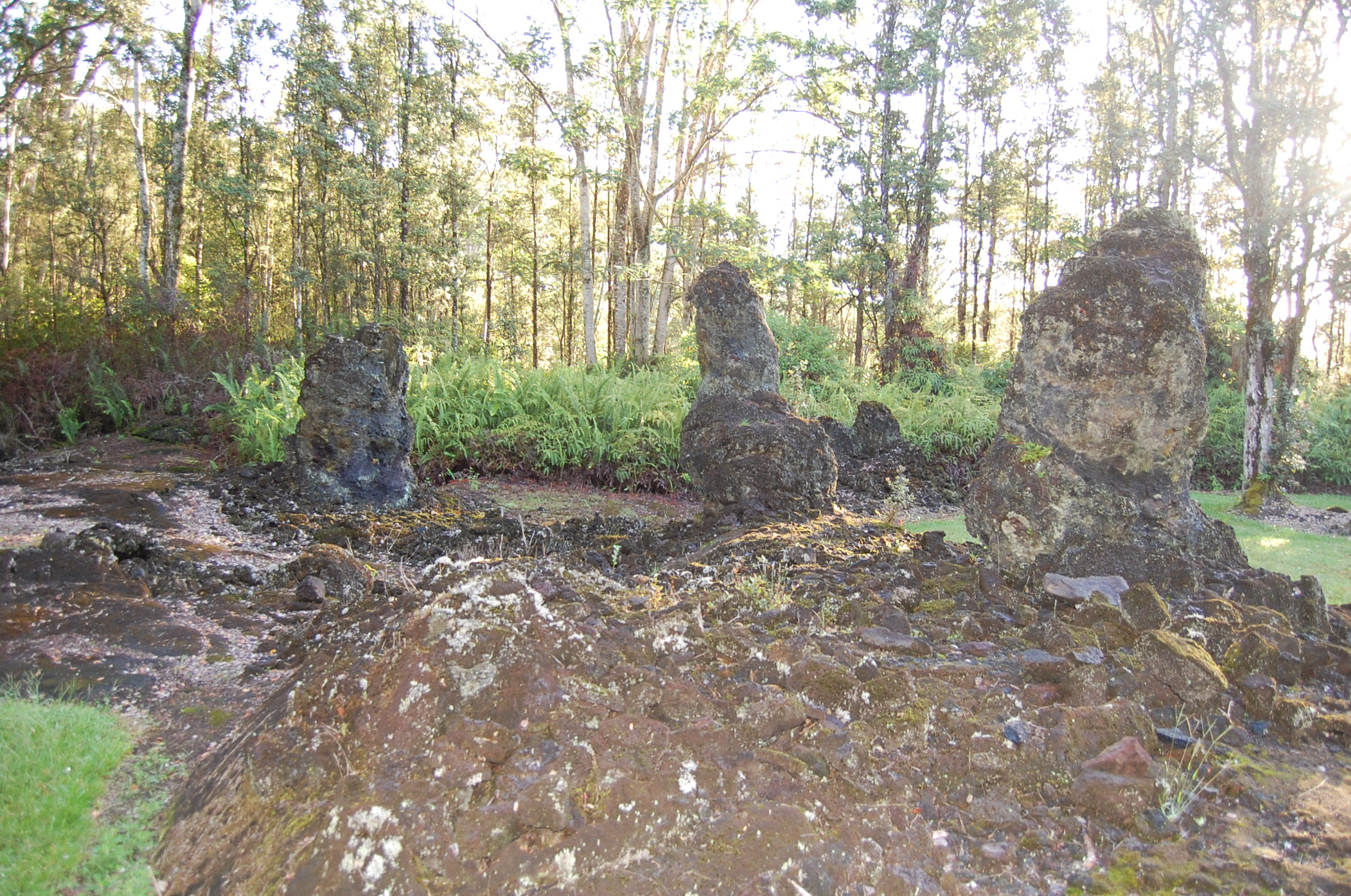
Lava Trees

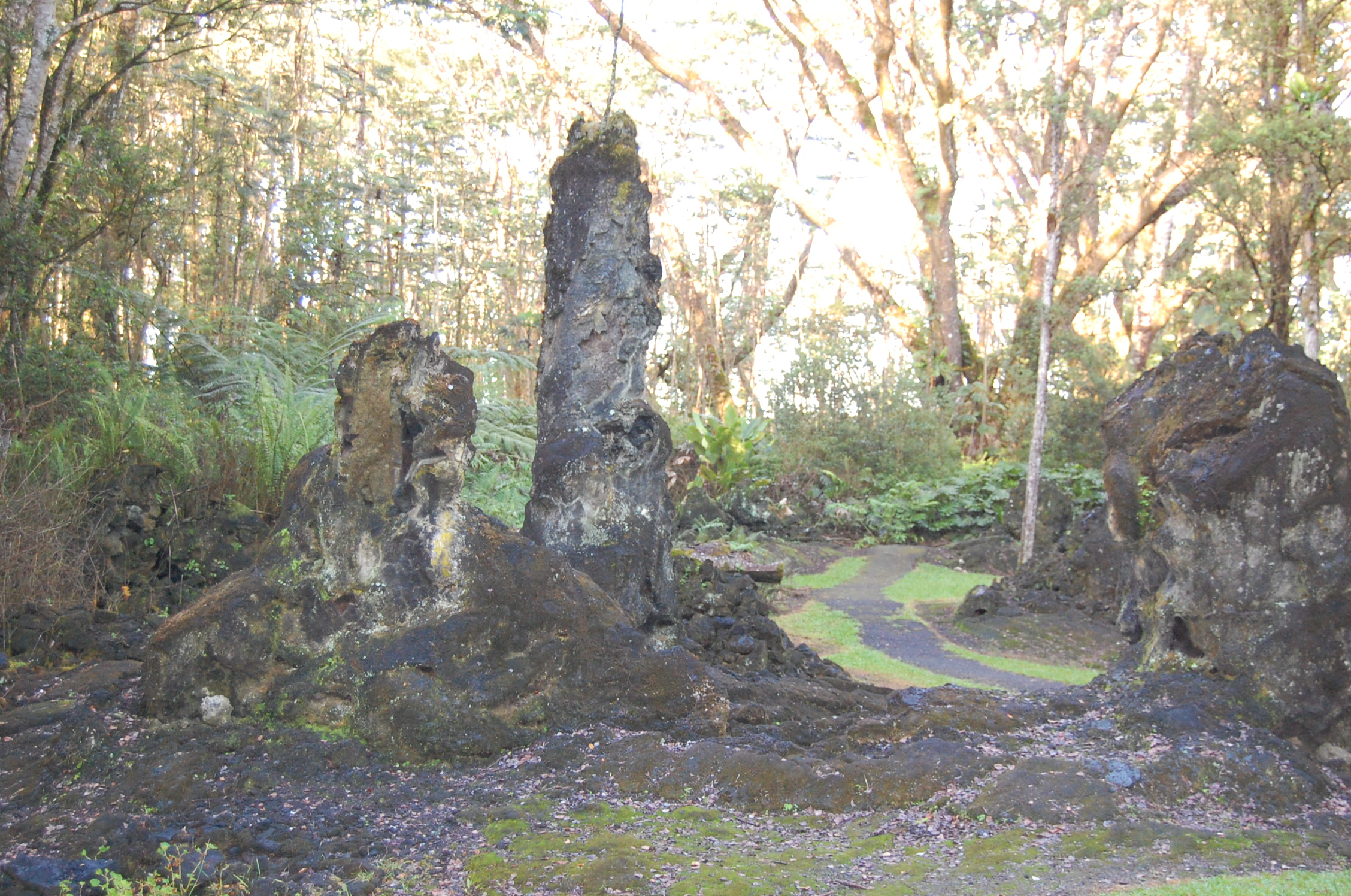
Lava Trees and path

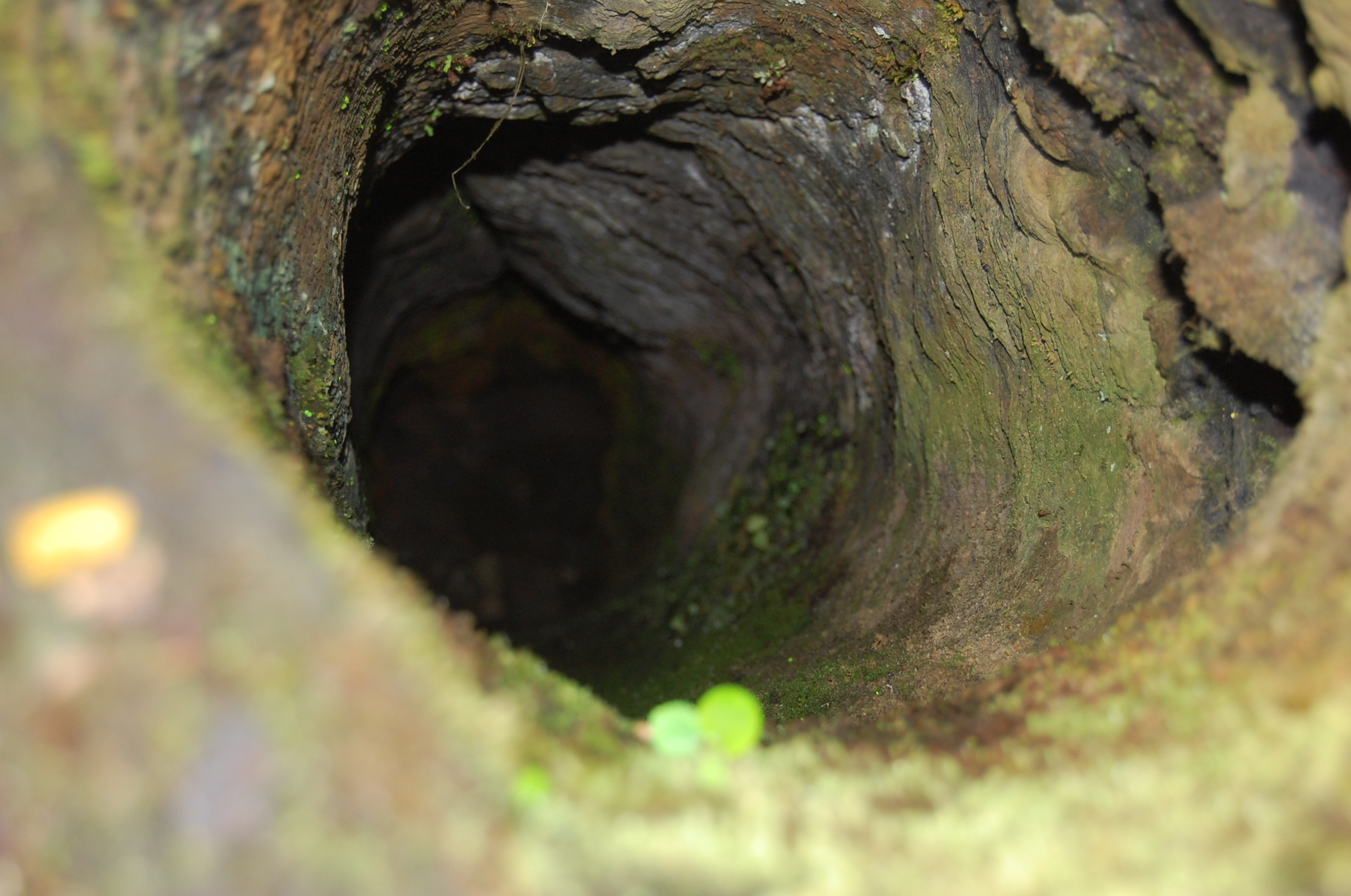
Inside view of lava tree with moss

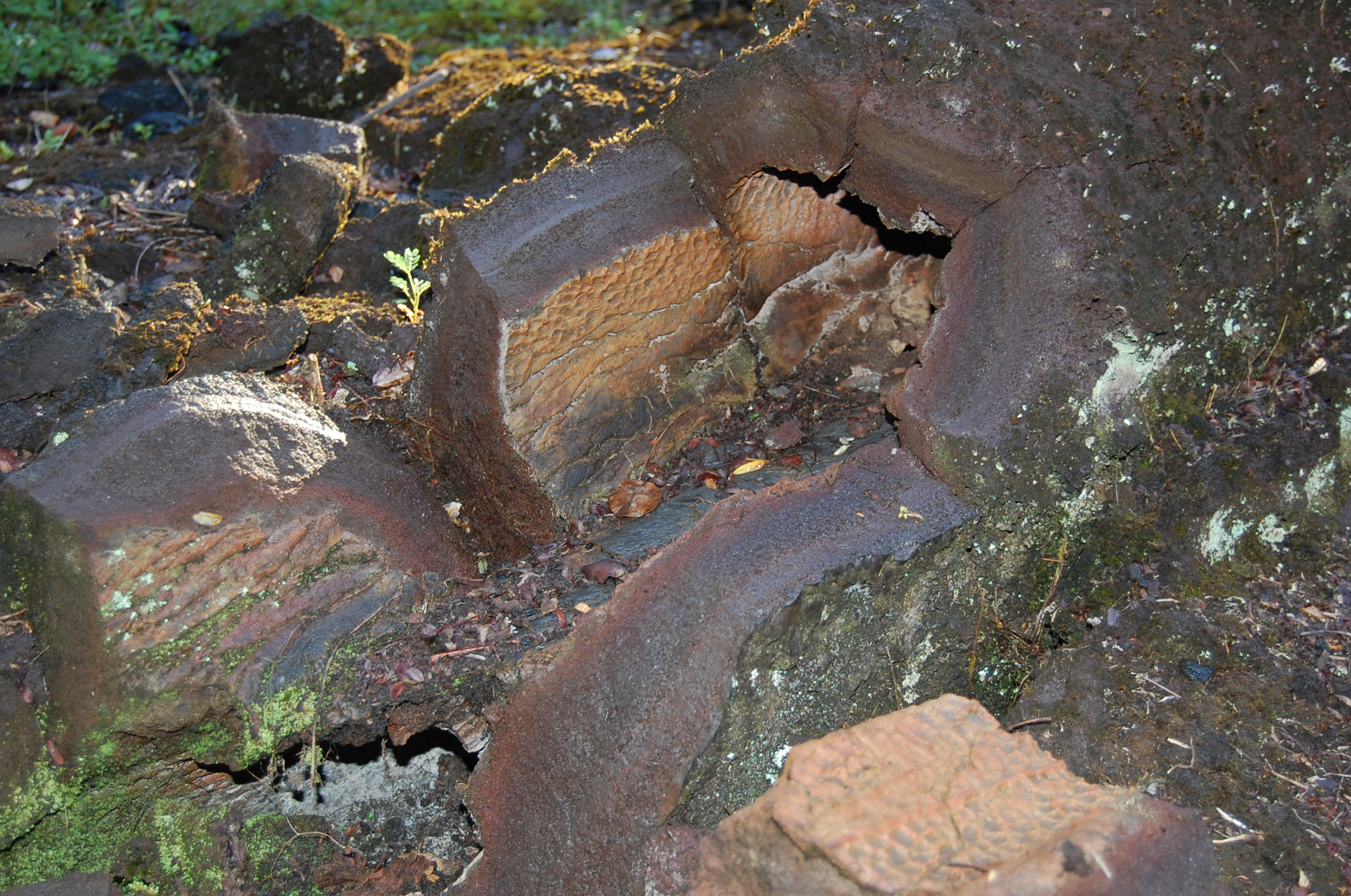
Large lava tree that fell and broke apart

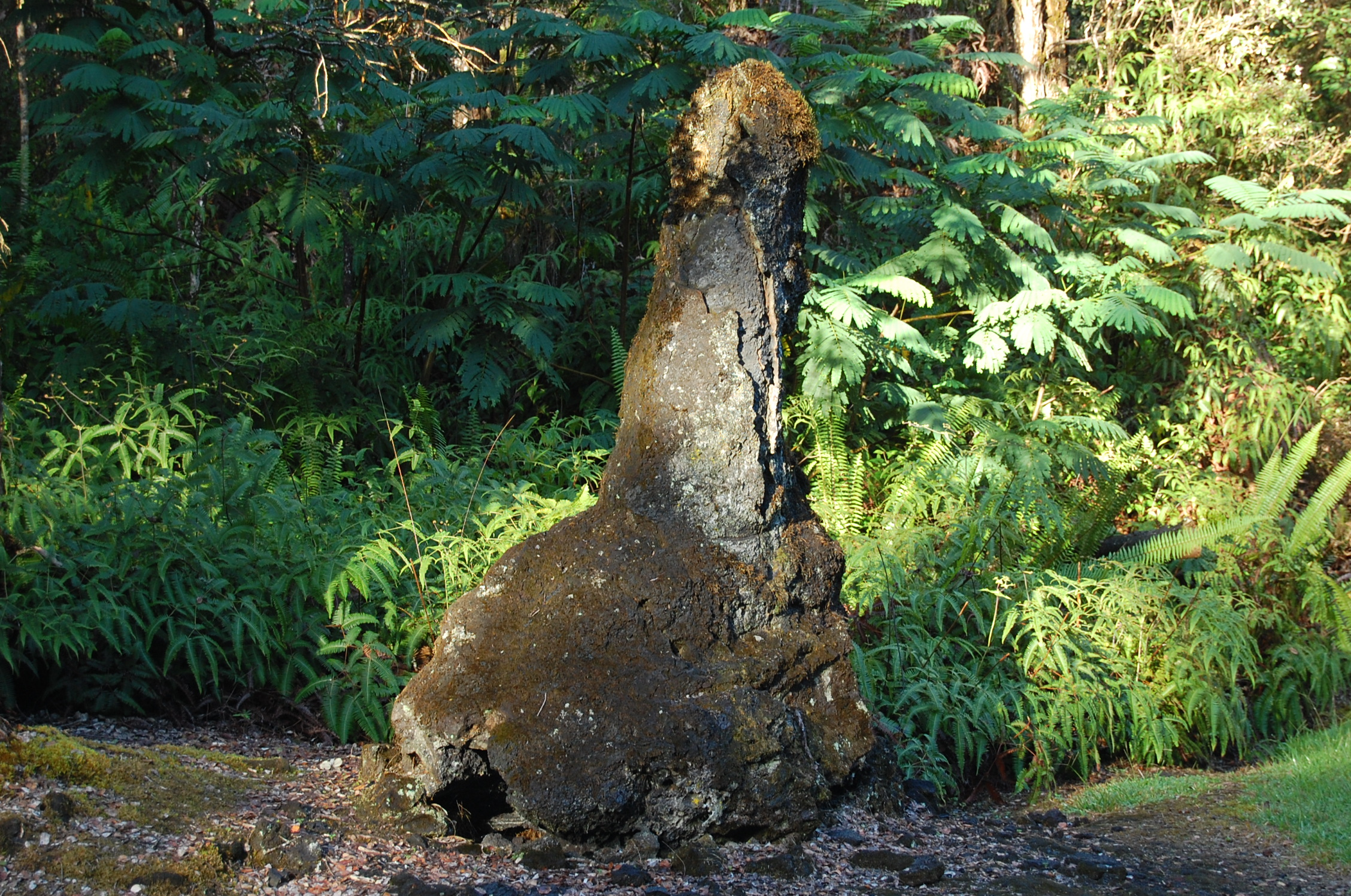
Lava tree

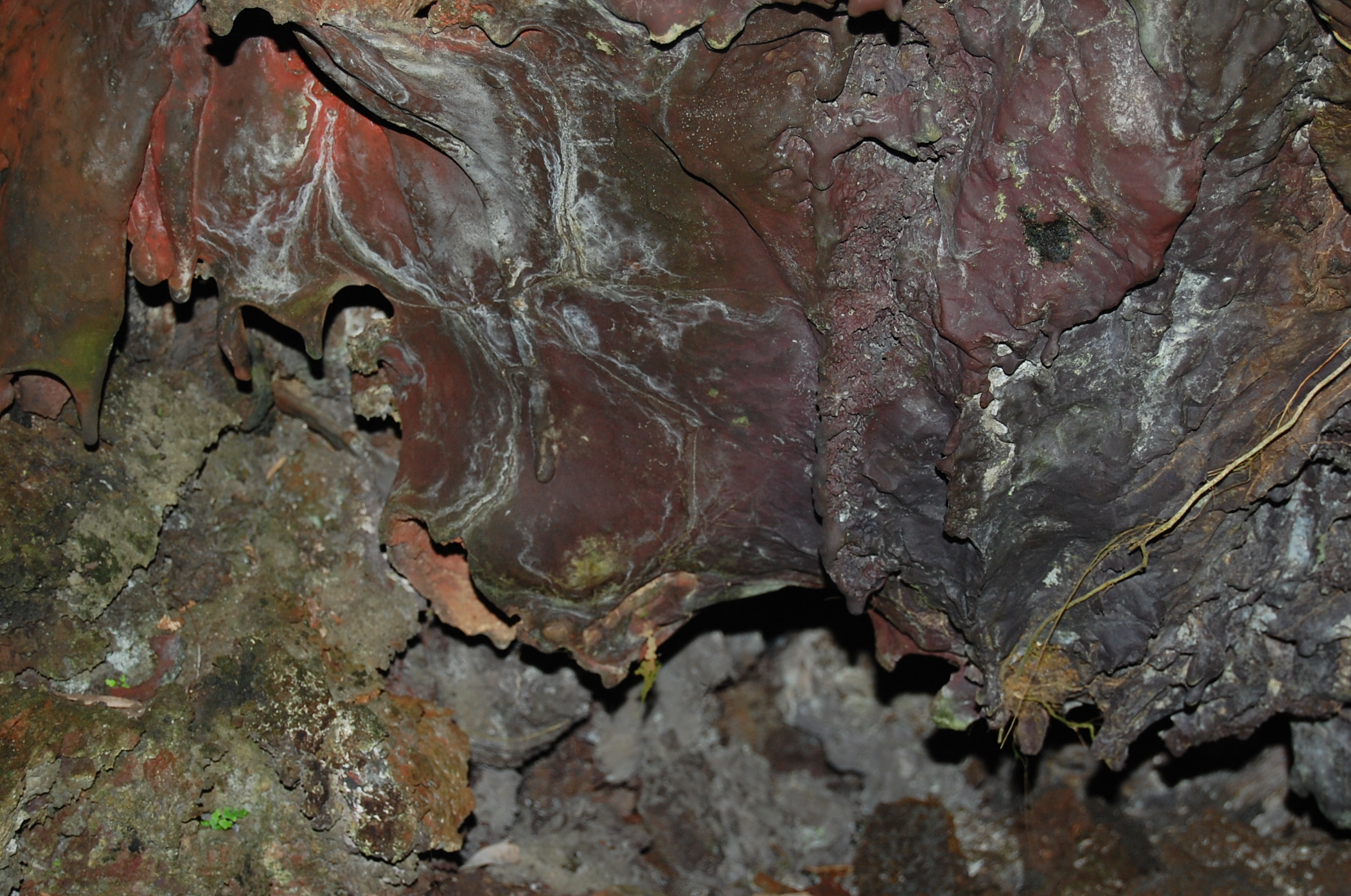
Lava formation inside one of the lava trees

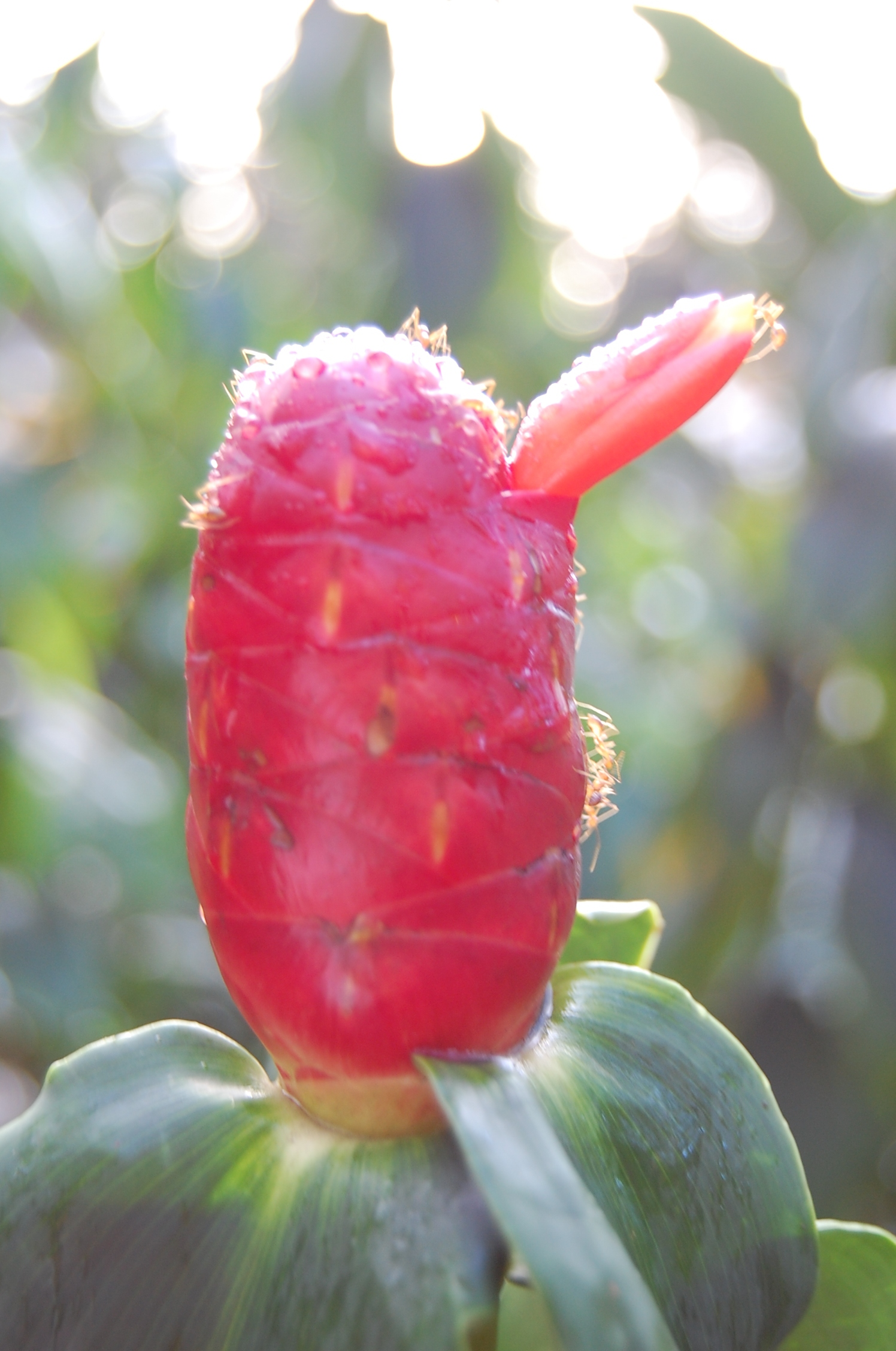
Plant life

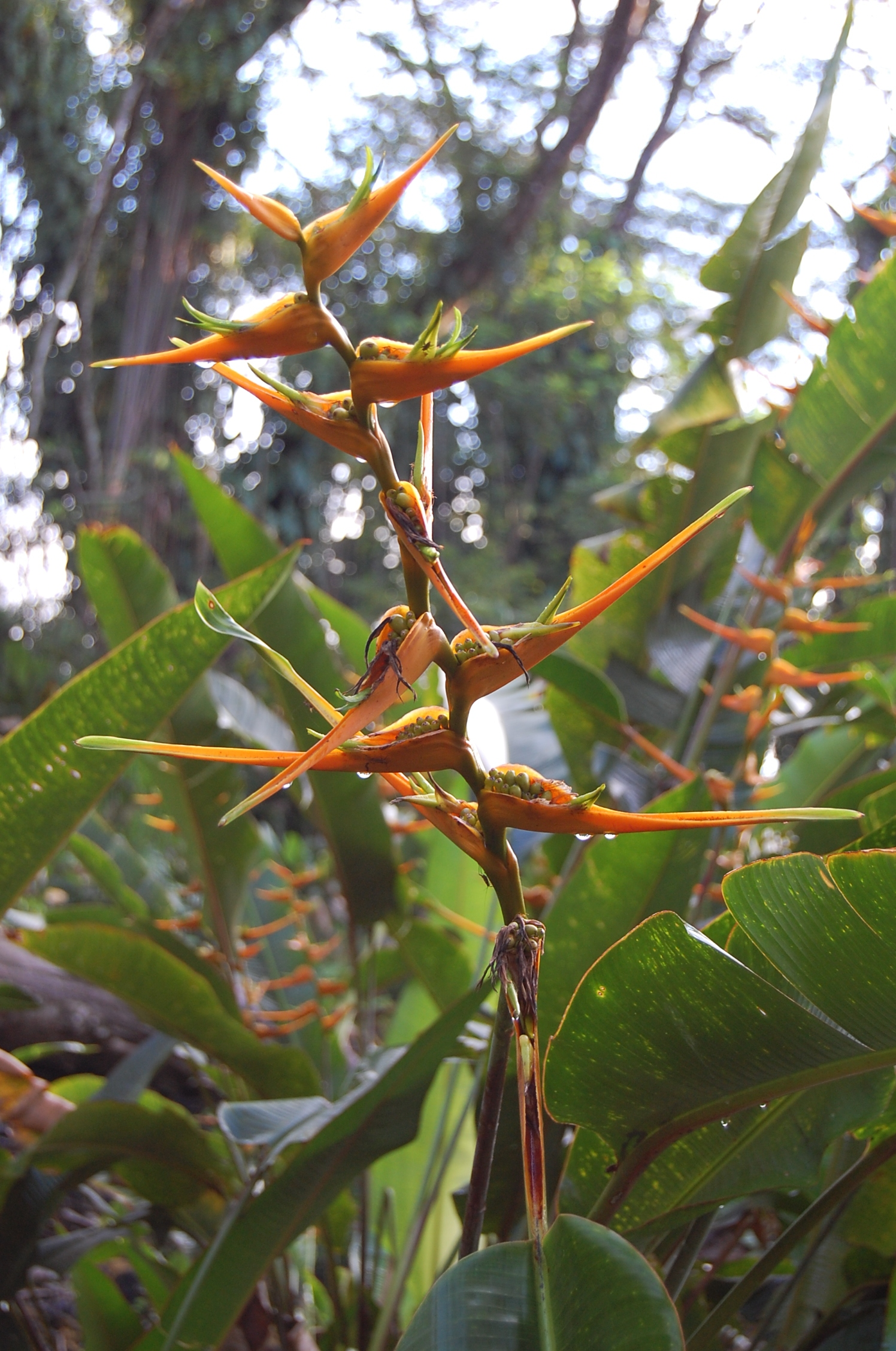
Plant life

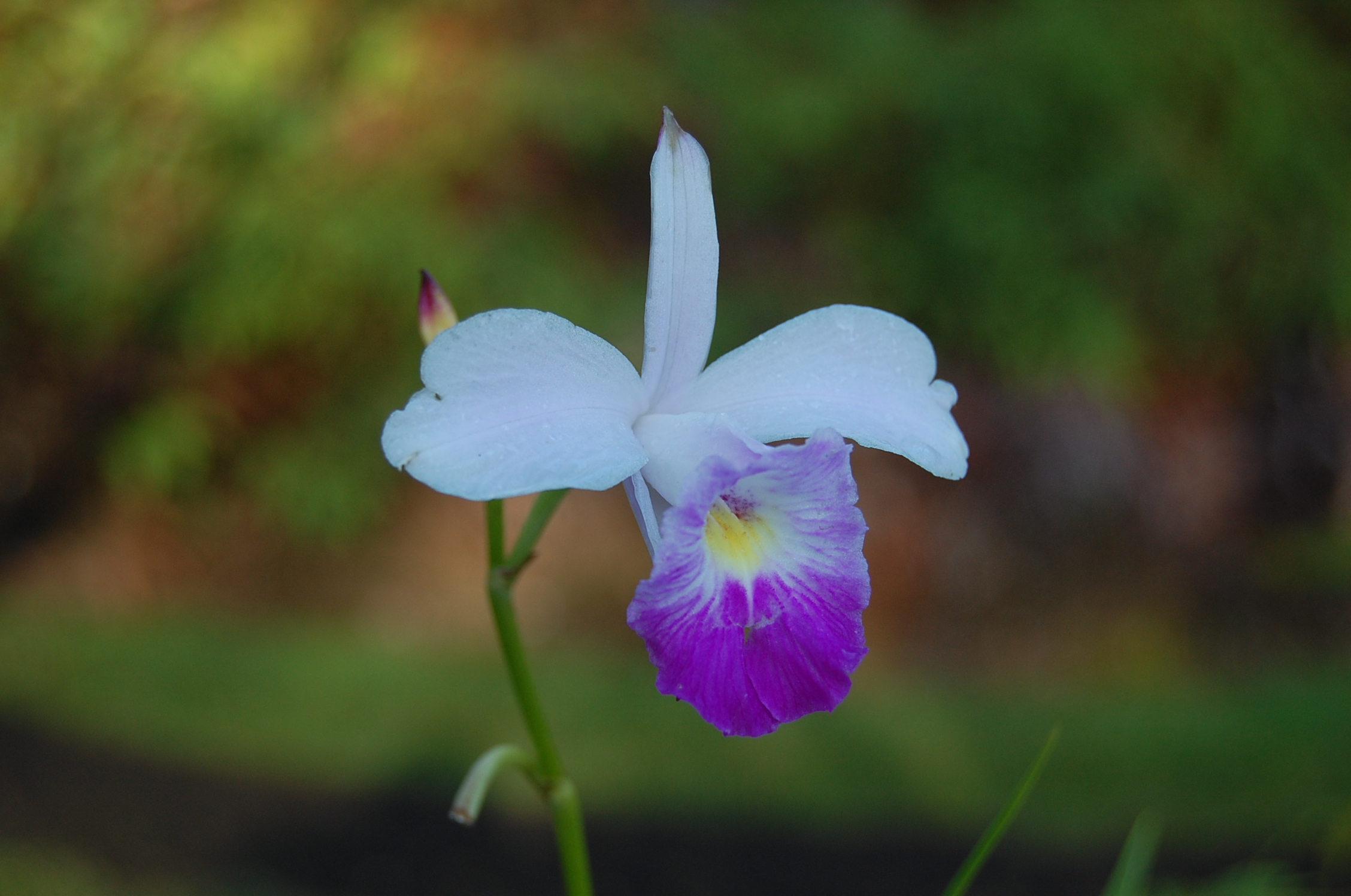
Orchid growing in the wild

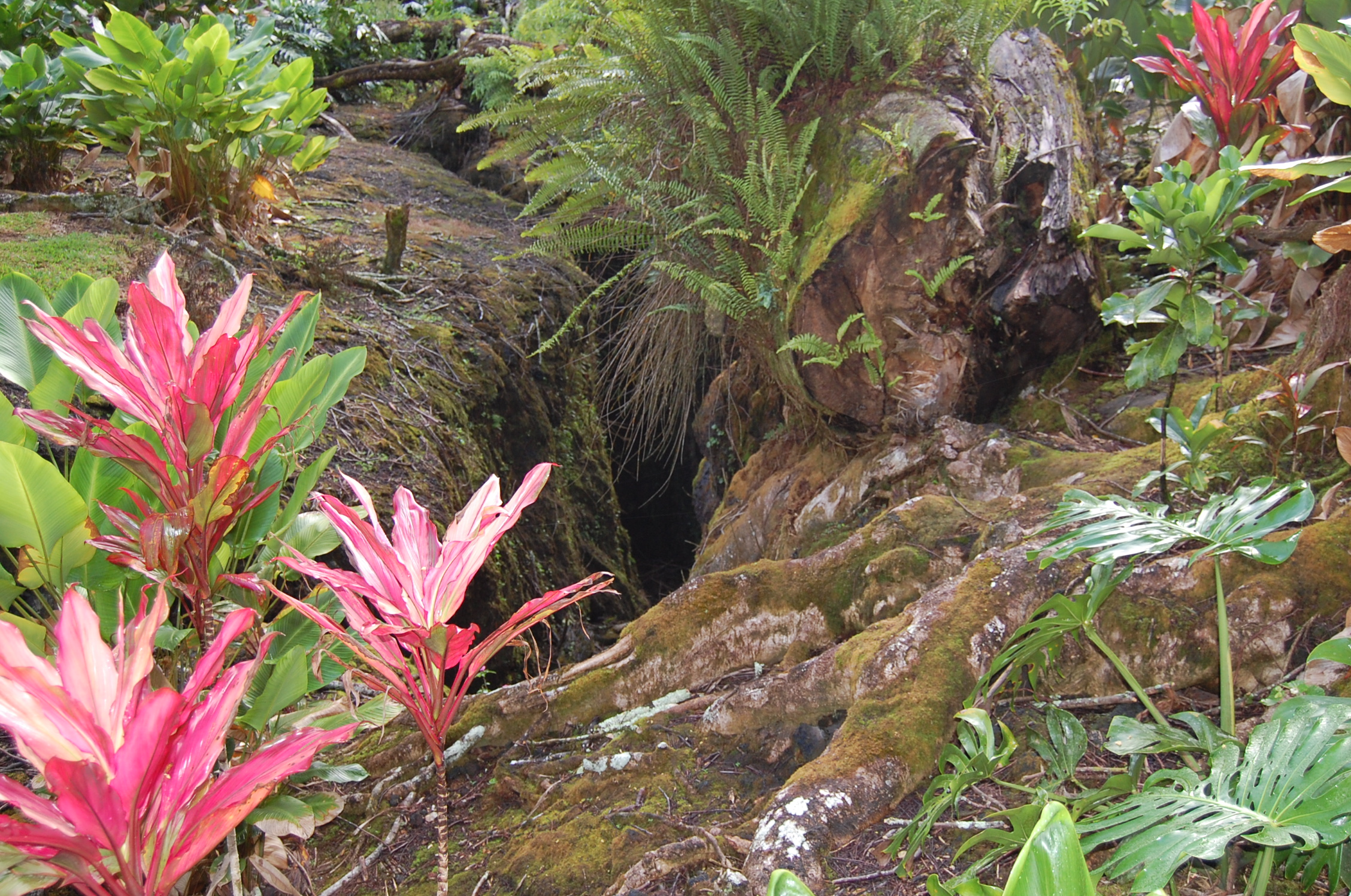
Plant life near deep cut in the ground

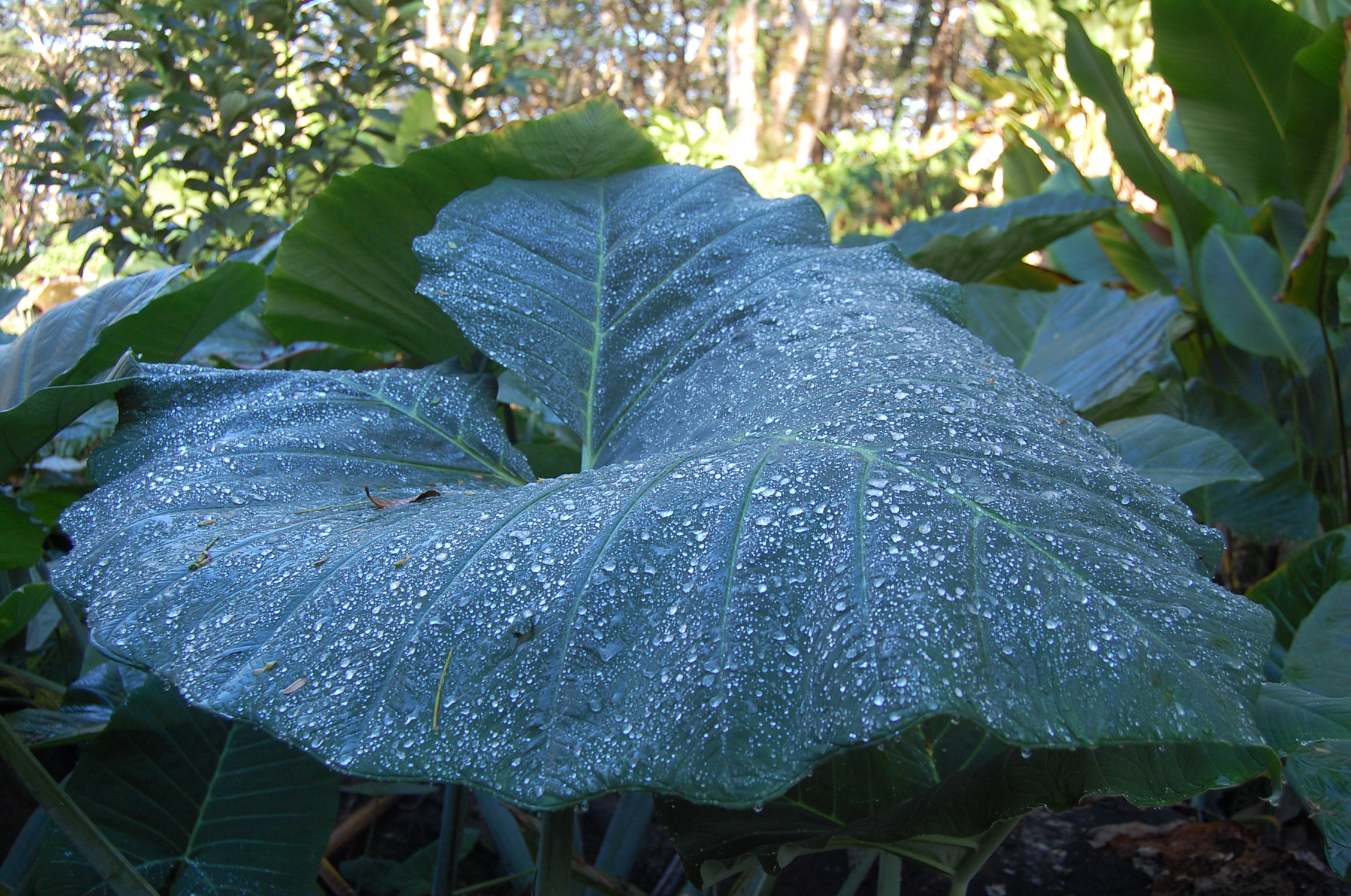
Plant life with morning dew

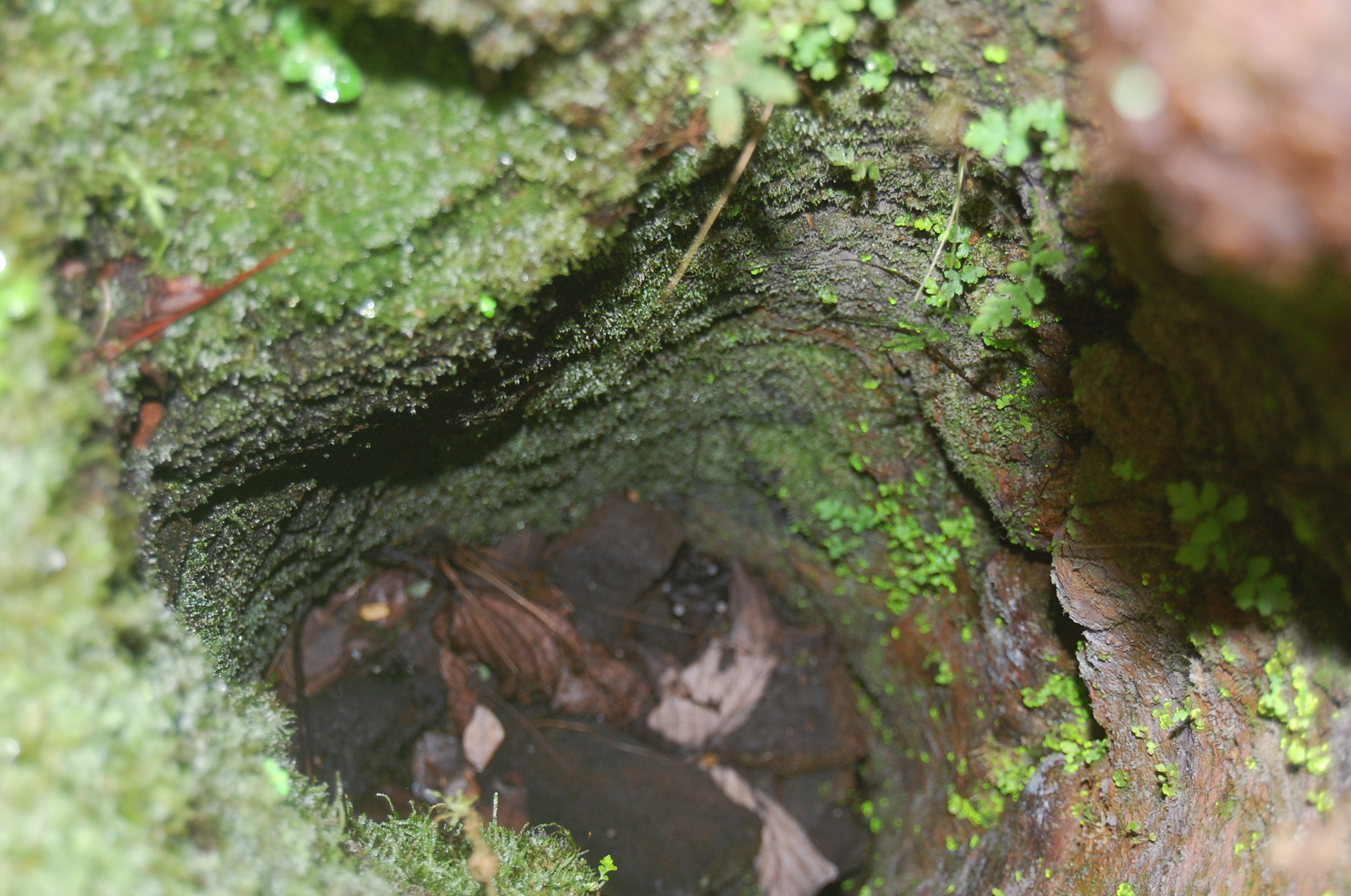
Plant life and moss growing inside trunk of lava tree
