= Puaʻa Kaʻa State Wayside Park =

Protected area of Maui County, Hawaii, United States

Coordinates: 20.821792°N 156.122074°W

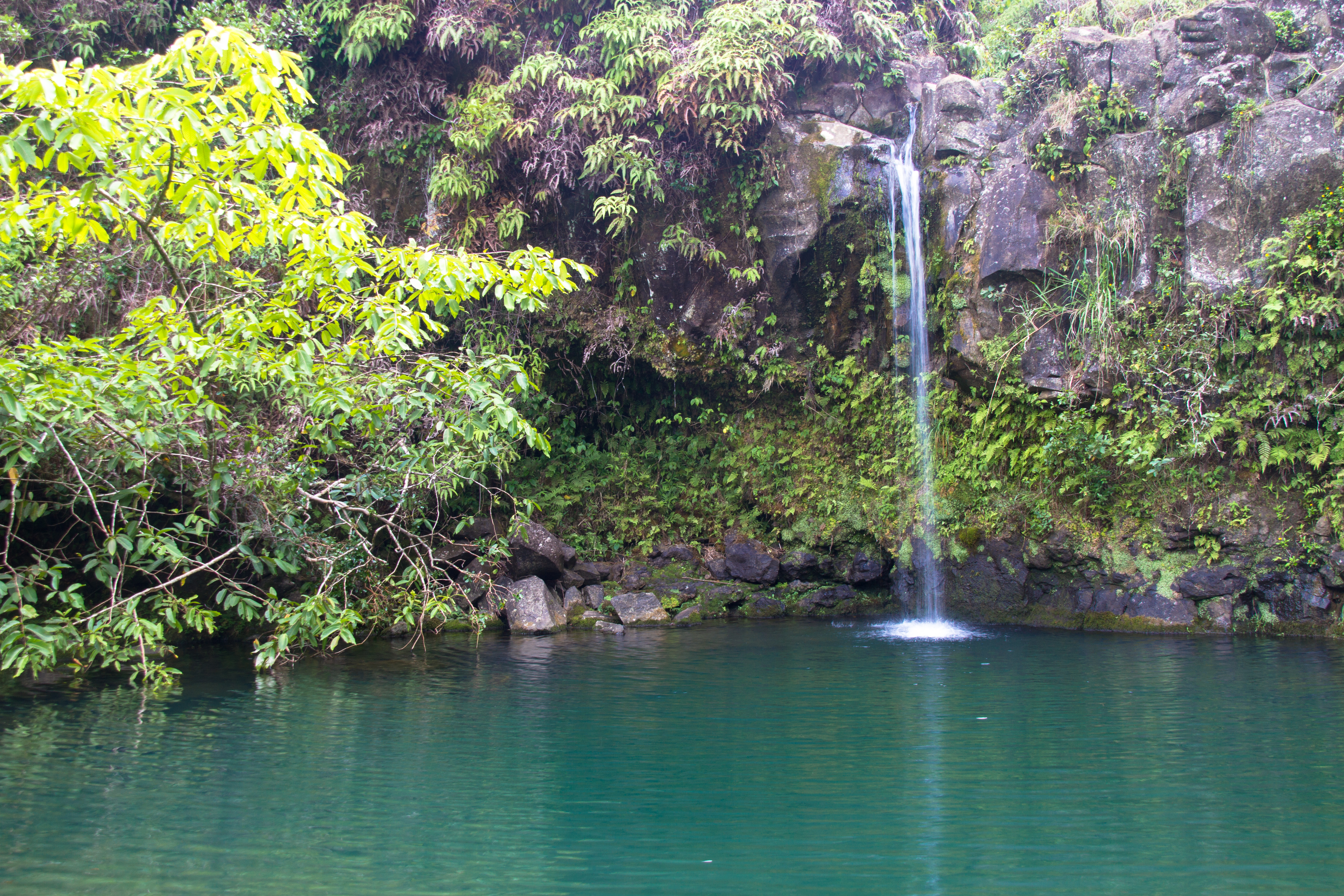
Pua'a Ka'a Falls at Pua'a Ka'a State Wayside Park, August 2013

Puaʻa Kaʻa State Wayside Park is a state park on the island of Maui, Hawaiʻi. It is located along the Hana Highway approximately 39 mi (63 km) east of Kahului. The area consists of 5 acres (2.0 ha) of rainforest with waterfalls and pools. The park is at an elevation of 1,200 ft (370 m) and roughly 0.5 mi (0.80 km) away from Waiohue Bay.

== See also ==
- List of Hawaii state parks
