= ʻAiea, Hawaii =

Census-designated place in Hawaii, United States

ʻAiea
- Census-designated place
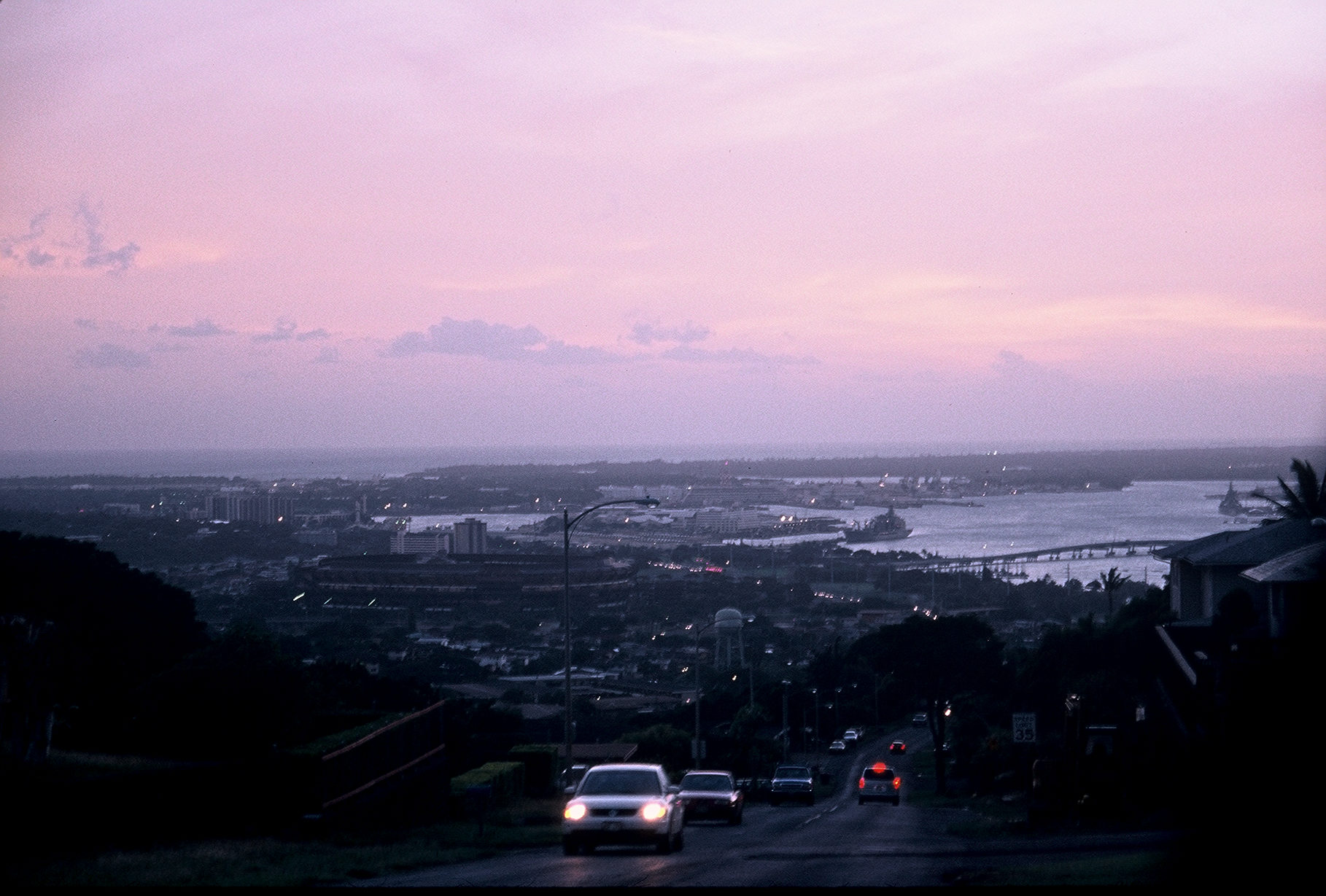
- View overlooking Pearl Harbor and Aloha Stadium from the Aiea Heights neighborhood of Aiea

- Location in Honolulu County and the state of Hawaii
- Coordinates: 21°23′9″N 157°55′51″W
- Country: United States
- State: Hawaii
- County: Honolulu

Area
  - Total: 1.77 sq mi (4.58 km^{2})
  - Land: 1.66 sq mi (4.30 km^{2})
  - Water: 0.11 sq mi (0.28 km^{2})
- Elevation: 249 ft (76 m)

Population (2020)
  - Total: 10,408
  - Density: 6,266.2/sq mi (2,419.39/km^{2})
- Time zone: UTC-10
- ZIP code: 96701
- Area code: 808
- GNIS feature ID: 2413992

ʻAiea (/aɪˈeɪə/; Hawaiian: [ʔɐjˈɛjə]) is a census-designated place (CDP) located in the City and County of Honolulu, Hawaii, United States. As of the 2020 Census, the CDP had a total population of 10,408.

== Geography ==
ʻAiea is located at 21°23′9″N 157°55′51″W (21.385900, −157.930927). According to the United States Census Bureau, the CDP has a total area of 1.8 square miles (4.7 km^{2}), of which, 1.6 square miles (4.1 km^{2}) of it is land and 0.1 square miles (0.26 km^{2}) of it (5.71%) is water.

Kamehameha Highway (Hawaii Route 99) divides most of ʻAiea from the shore of Pearl Harbor (mostly US government property), and the parallel major thoroughfare, Interstate H-1, further cuts the town's commercial district into two distinct areas. These east–west routes (and other streets, such as Moanalua Road) connect ʻAiea to Pearl City, immediately adjacent on the west, and Halawa, adjacent on the east. The residential area known as ʻAiea Heights extends up the ridgeline above the town. The communities of Newtown Estates and Royal Summit are located at the western edge of ʻAiea near its border with Pearl City at Kaahumanu Street. Residents of the census-designated places (CDP) of Waimalu and Hālawa use ʻAiea in their postal address.

== Climate ==
Climate data for Aiea - Aloha Stadium
Month	Jan	Feb	Mar	Apr	May	Jun	Jul	Aug	Sep	Oct	Nov	Dec	Year
Mean daily maximum °F (°C)	78.5 (25.8)	80.5 (26.9)	79.0 (26.1)	81.1 (27.3)	83.3 (28.5)	84.0 (28.9)	84.8 (29.3)	86.4 (30.2)	86.8 (30.4)	85.2 (29.6)	80.0 (26.7)	77.9 (25.5)	82.5 (28.1)
Mean daily minimum °F (°C)	62.8 (17.1)	65.0 (18.3)	64.8 (18.2)	66.5 (19.2)	68.3 (20.2)	70.2 (21.2)	71.4 (21.9)	71.9 (22.2)	71.9 (22.2)	70.2 (21.2)	65.8 (18.8)	63.1 (17.3)	67.8 (19.9)
Average precipitation inches (mm)	3.5 (89)	3.3 (84)	2.4 (61)	2.7 (69)	2.5 (64)	2.1 (53)	0.9 (23)	0.8 (20)	0.9 (23)	1.8 (46)	3.2 (81)	2.7 (69)	26.8 (680)
Source: Weatherbase

== History ==
Historically, ʻAiea was an ahupuaʻa, or area of land ruled by chief or king and managed by the members of the ʻaliʻi.

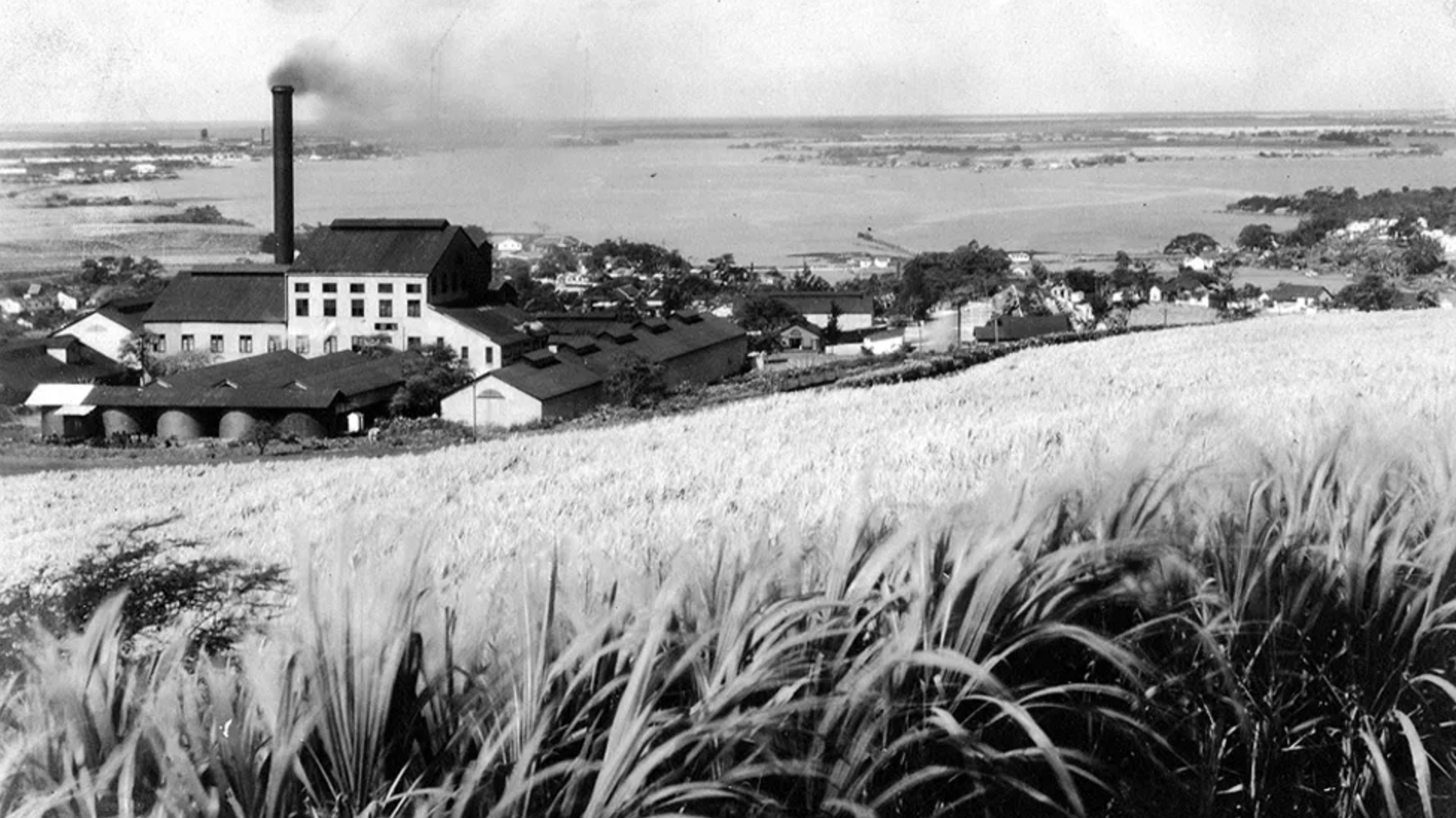
ʻAiea Sugar Mill (c. 1915)

"ʻAiea" was originally the name of an ahupuaʻa, or Hawaiian land division. The name was derived from a species of plant in the nightshade family, Nothocestrum latifolium. It stretched from ʻAiea Bay (part of Pearl Harbor) into the mountains to the north.

At the end of the 19th century, a sugarcane plantation commonly known as ʻAiea Sugar Mill was opened in the district by the Honolulu Sugar Company.

In July 1941, five months before the attack on Pearl Harbor, Commander Thomas C Latimore from USS Dobbin, vanished while walking in the hills above ʻAiea. Despite several major searches and a naval investigation, his disappearance has never been explained. Within the U.S. Navy, many believed he might have been abducted and killed by a local Hawaiian Japanese spy ring because he had either stumbled upon their activities in the hills or had been specifically targeted because of his background in Naval Intelligence.

On December 7, 1941, a large part of the Japanese attack focused on the military installations around the town and the ships moored off shore. For example, one damaged ship, USS Vestal, beached in ʻAiea Bay to prevent sinking. Many people photographed the attack from the hills in ʻAiea. Part of Naval Base Hawaii was built in ʻAiea, including the Aiea Naval Hospital and the Nimitz Bowl.

After World War II the plantation shut down and the mill was converted into a sugar refinery. Meanwhile, developers started extending the town into the surrounding former sugarcane fields. In the years since then, ʻAiea has grown into an important suburb of Honolulu. The town's sugar history came to a close in 1996, when C&H Sugar closed the refinery. Then in 1998, the 99-year-old sugar mill was torn down by the owners, amid protests from town residents and the County government.

== Demographics ==
Historical population
Census	Pop.	Note	%±
2020	10,408		—
U.S. Decennial Census

As of the census of 2000, there were 9,019 people, 2,758 households, and 2,258 families residing in the CDP. The population density was 5,463.5 inhabitants per square mile (2,109.5/km^{2}). There were 2,831 housing units at an average density of 1,714.9 per square mile (662.1/km^{2}). The racial makeup of the CDP was 16.25% White, 0.85% Black or African American, 0.14% Native American, 58.31% Asian, 5.08% Pacific Islander, 0.77% from other races, and 18.59% from two or more races. 5.47% of the population were Hispanic or Latino of any race.

There were 2,758 households, out of which 27.3% had children under the age of 18 living with them, 63.0% were married couples living together, 13.3% had a female householder with no husband present, and 18.1% were non-families. 13.9% of all households were made up of individuals, and 7.7% had someone living alone who was 65 years of age or older. The average household size was 3.24 and the average family size was 3.51.

In the CDP the population was spread out, with 21.2% under the age of 18, 6.4% from 18 to 24, 27.6% from 25 to 44, 23.1% from 45 to 64, and 21.7% who were 65 years of age or older. The median age was 42 years. For every 100 females there were 96.3 males. For every 100 females age 18 and over, there were 96.0 males.

The median income for a household in the CDP was $71,155, and the median income for a family was $75,992. Males had a median income of $41,384 versus $32,394 for females. The per capita income for the CDP was $25,111. 4.6% of the population and 3.4% of families were below the poverty line. Out of the total population, 8.1% of those under the age of 18 and 4.0% of those 65 and older were living below the poverty line.

== Attractions ==
ʻAiea is the home of Pearlridge, Hawaii's largest enclosed shopping center and second largest shopping center in the state. The mall is separated into two sections, known as Uptown and Downtown, and includes a monorail. There is a hospital located on mall property (Pali Momi Medical Center), and Hawaii's largest watercress farm (Sumida Farm).

Aloha Stadium, formerly home of the University of Hawaiʻi Warriors football team, and the host site for the Hawaiʻi Bowl every Christmas Eve and the National Football League's Pro Bowl every February (except in 2009), was located in the adjacent Halawa CDP.

ʻAiea is home to Keaiwa Heiau, an ancient medicine shrine. There is a 4.5-mile (7.2 km) loop trail. A World War II plane crashed in the trail and can be seen halfway through.

== Government and infrastructure ==
The United States Postal Service operates the ʻAiea Post Office.

The Hawaii Department of Public Safety operates the Halawa Correctional Facility in an area near ʻAiea.

Camp H. M. Smith, headquarters of the United States Pacific Command, is located in ʻAiea.

== Education ==
All areas of Hawaii are served by public schools of the Hawaii Department of Education.

Alvah A. Scott Elementary School is in the ʻAiea CDP. ʻAiea and Gus Webling elementary schools are in the adjacent Halawa CDP. Pearl Ridge Elementary School is in the Waimalu CDP. Waimalu Elementary School was in Waimalu CDP in 2000, but in 2010 is now in Pearl City CDP.

ʻAiea Intermediate School is in Halawa CDP, and Aiea High School are the secondary schools in the ʻAiea CDP.

Private schools in the area include St. Elizabeth Catholic School (of the Roman Catholic Diocese of Honolulu) in ʻAiea CDP, and Our Savior Lutheran School (LCMS) in Waimalu CDP (ʻAiea address), both of which are K-8 schools.

== Notable people ==
- Dennis Alexio, kickboxer and actor
- Brandon Elefante, politician
- Scott G. Gier, author
- Mark Kealiʻi Hoʻomalu, Hawaiian chanter
- Joe Kuroda, politician
- Robert T. Kuroda, Medal of Honor recipient
- Dennis Lajola, tennis player
- Lori Matsukawa, television news journalist
- Bette Midler, singer, actress, comedian and author
- Marc Miyake, linguist
- Gary Okihiro, author and scholar
- Maria Quiban, weather anchor
- Garret T. Sato, actor
- Mark Takai, member of the United States House of Representatives
- Tuufuli Uperesa, football player
