= USS Dobbin =

Tender of the United States Navy

USS Dobbin (AD-3)
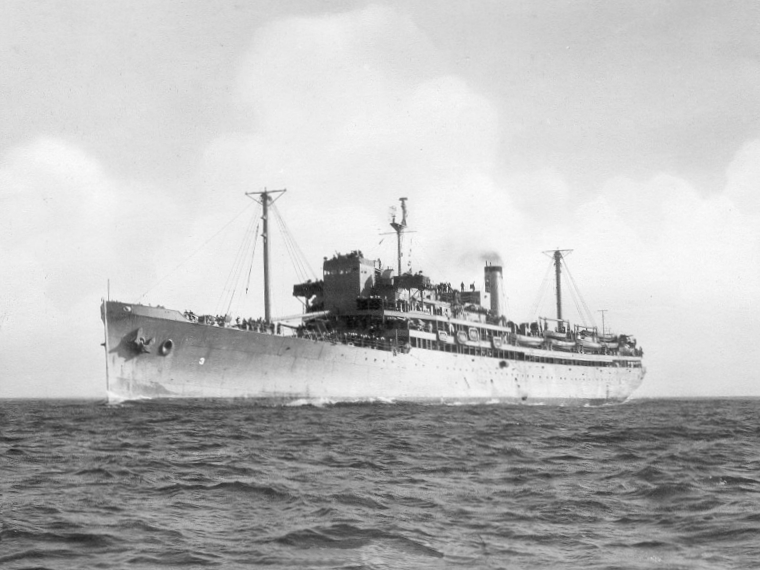
- USS Dobbin (AD-3)

History

United States
- Name: USS Dobbin
- Builder: Philadelphia Navy Yard
- Launched: 5 May 1921
- Sponsored by: Mrs. H. H. James
- Commissioned: 23 July 1924
- Decommissioned: 27 September 1946
- Honours and awards: 1 × battle star
- Fate: Transferred to the United States Maritime Commission, 24 December 1946, for lay up in the National Defense Reserve Fleet, Olympia, WA. Sold for scrapping, 5 May 1950

General characteristics
- Type: Destroyer tender
- Displacement: 12,450 long tons (12,650 t) full load
- Length: 483 ft 10 in (147.47 m)
- Beam: 61 ft (19 m)
- Draft: 24 ft 1 in (7.34 m)
- Propulsion: Parsons geared turbines
- Speed: 16 knots (30 km/h; 18 mph)
- Armament: 4 × single 5-inch/38-caliber guns

USS Dobbin (AD-3) is the name of a United States Navy destroyer tender of World War II, named after James Cochrane Dobbin, the Secretary of the Navy from 1853 to 1857.

Dobbin was launched on 5 May 1921 by the Philadelphia Navy Yard. She was commissioned on 23 July 1924, and served for 22 years before being decommissioned on 27 September 1946, and transferred to the United States Maritime Commission for disposal.

== Pre-World War II ==
Dobbin (AD-3) was launched on 5 May 1921 at the Philadelphia Navy Yard, sponsored by Mrs. H. H. James, granddaughter of Secretary Dobbin. She was commissioned on 23 July 1924.

On 3 January 1925 Dobbin sailed for Guantanamo Bay, Cuba, by way of Newport, Rhode Island, and Hampton Roads, Virginia, where she loaded equipment and supplies for her mission as tender to Destroyer Squadron 14 of the Scouting Fleet. She joined that squadron at Guantanamo Bay, and took part in gunnery practice with the destroyers. From this base, on 13 February 1925, Dobbin steamed to the Panama Canal and crossed to the Pacific Ocean. After maneuvers at sea with the Scouting Fleet she arrived at San Diego on 9 March 1925 for four months of tender service along the west coast and at Pearl Harbor, Hawaii.

Dobbin returned to the east coast in July 1925 and operated in the Atlantic Ocean for the next seven years. During this time she participated in radio experiments and continued her services to the destroyers of the Scouting Fleet. In 1932, Dobbin returned to San Diego, arriving 1 September, and operated out of that port until 5 October 1939. At that time she was transferred to Hawaii and based on Pearl Harbor.

== Missing captain ==
In July 1941 Commander Thomas C. Latimore, Dobbin's captain, disappeared while hiking the local Aiea Hills. His body was never found and was the subject of much local news coverage and rumor before being overshadowed by the Pearl Harbor attack. Commander Latimore was declared legally dead in July 1942.

== Attack on Pearl Harbor ==
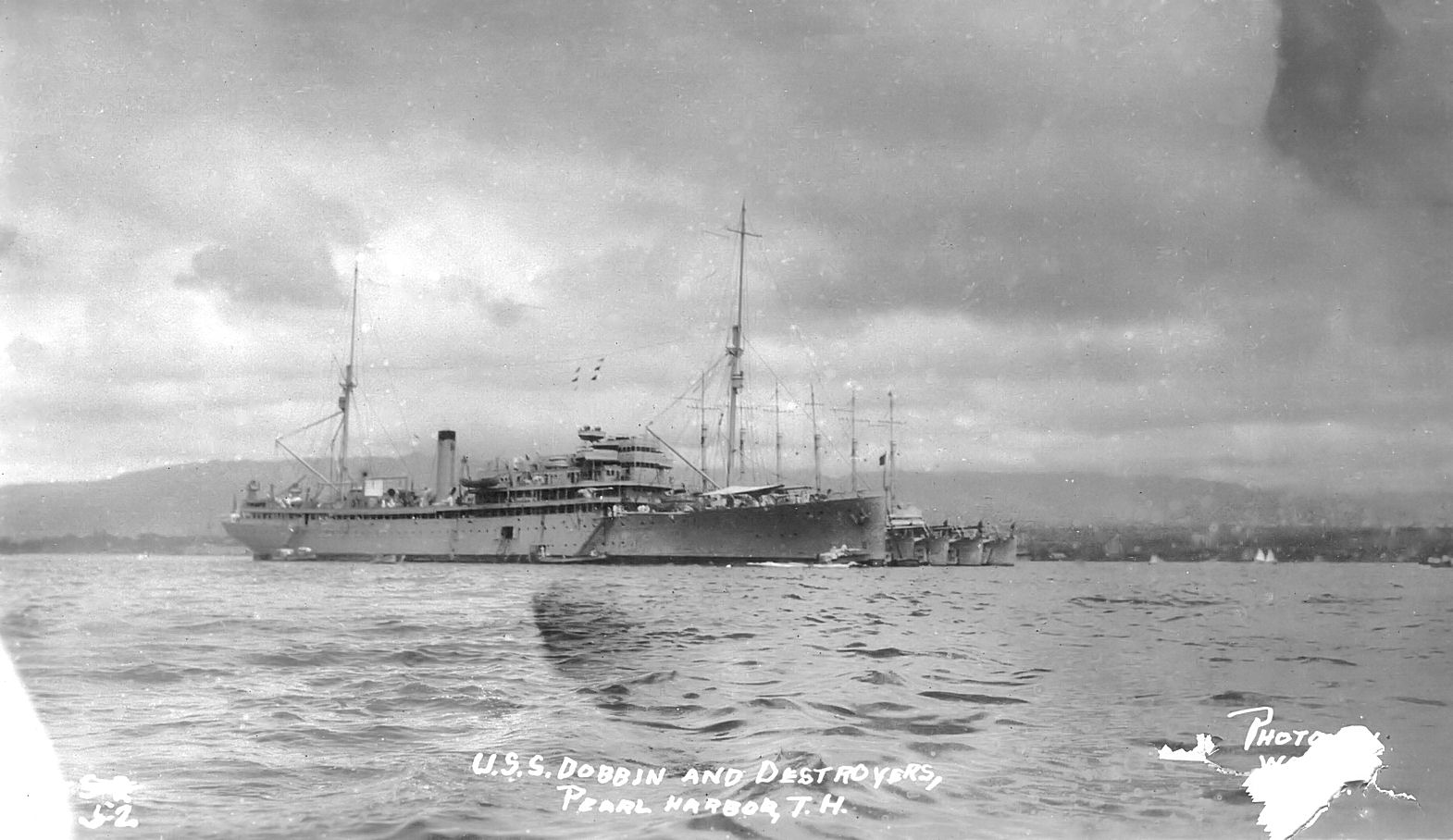
USS Dobbin (AD-3) and destroyers at Pearl Harbor.

Dobbin was present during the attack on Pearl Harbor on 7 December 1941. At the time of the attack she was moored northeast of Ford Island with five destroyers, USS Phelps (DD-360), USS Macdonough (DD-351), USS Worden (DD-352), USS Dewey (DD-349) and USS Hull (DD-350).

Dobbin's crew watched as Japanese planes targeted Battleship Row, but as the battleships each took heavy damage the Japanese pilots looked for other targets. Seeing that the ship had admiral flags, the aircraft tried to bomb Dobbin, but the ship only took shrapnel damage.

Dobbin's small craft spent the morning picking up survivors and taking the wounded to shore. The ship picked up hundreds of sailors from other ships, and when she left the harbor in search of the Japanese fleet, 200 men from USS Raleigh (CL-7) alone were aboard.

== World War II ==
After the attack, Dobbin served in the Hawaiian area until May 1942 and then she was sent to Sydney, Australia. Dobbin was one of several Allied vessels located in Sydney Harbor during the Japanese midget submarine attack of 31 May 1942. On 25 June 1943 she was sent to Brisbane, Mackay, Townsville, and Cleveland Bay, Australia, before arriving at Milne Bay, New Guinea, 30 September 1943. She stayed near New Guinea until 14 February 1945, at which point she moved to Subic Bay in the Philippines. She served at Subic Bay from 24 February to 3 November 1945.

== Fate ==
Dobbin returned to San Diego on 7 December 1945 and was decommissioned on 27 September 1946. She was transferred to the Maritime Commission for disposal on 24 December 1946, and sold in May 1950 to Zidell Marine in the Portland shipyards for scrapping. The mast was salvaged and sold to the Cornelius, Oregon fire department, which erected it and mounted a siren in 1953. The mast and siren was taken down in 2017. As of Aug, 2024, there were ongoing efforts by the Cornelius Historical society to preserve and reinstall the mast -- see external links section for relevant Cornelius Historical society posts on Facebook.

== Awards ==
- American Defense Service Medal with "FLEET" clasp
- Asiatic–Pacific Campaign Medal with one battle star
- World War II Victory Medal
