= Joe Kuroda =

American politician

Joseph T. Kuroda

Member of the Hawaii Senate
- In office 1972–1988

Personal details
- Born: March 24, 1927 (age 99) Aiea, Hawaii, U.S.
- Party: Democratic
- Education: University of Hawaiʻi
- Profession: educator =

Joseph Toshiyuki Kuroda (born March 24, 1927) is an American former politician who served as a member of the Hawaii Senate.

== Life and career ==
Kuroda was born in Aiea, Hawaii. He earned a bachelor's degree in education and master's degree in educational administration from the University of Hawaiʻi. A Democrat, Kuroda served in the Hawaii Senate from 1972 to 1988, having previously served in the Hawaii House of Representatives in 1971. He served stints as majority leader and vice president of the Senate. Kuroda married Betty Mieko Nakagawa and has three children.
