= Thomas C. Latimore =

American naval officer

Commander Thomas C. Latimore
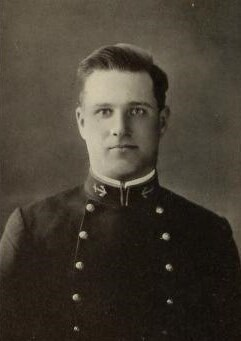
- Latimore in 1914, the year he graduated from the United States Naval Academy

Governor of American Samoa
- In office April 10, 1934 – April 17, 1934
- Preceded by: George Landenberger
- Succeeded by: Otto Dowling

Personal details
- Born: June 28, 1890
- Died: July, 1941? Oahu, Hawaii, U.S.
- Profession: Naval officer

Military service
- Allegiance: United States of America
- Branch/service: United States Navy
- Years of service: 1910–1941
- Rank: Commander
- Battles/wars: World War I

Commander Thomas Calloway Latimore (28 June 1890 – July, 1941?) was an American naval officer who was captain of USS Dobbin, and the governor of American Samoa. His disappearance in Hawaii, just months before the 7 December 1941 attack on Pearl Harbor, remains an unsolved mystery.

== Naval career ==
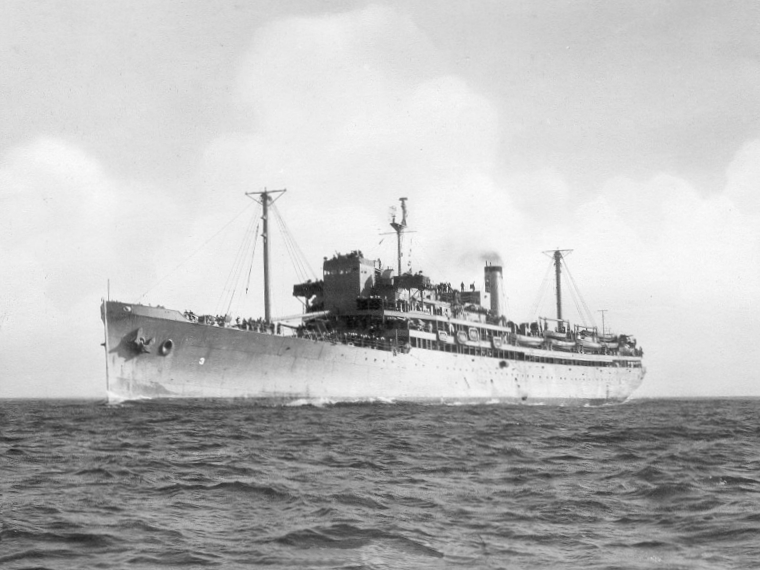
Commander Thomas C Latimore's ship USS Dobbin at sea, circa 1941.

Thomas Latimore was born in Tennessee on June 28, 1890, and entered the United States Naval Academy in 1910. He graduated and was commissioned an ensign in 1914. He was promoted to lieutenant (junior grade) in 1917. He served as acting Governor of American Samoa from April 10 to April 17, 1934. After a brief time at Naval Intelligence in Washington, D.C., Latimore was given the command of the destroyer tender USS Dobbin in April 1941 at Pearl Harbor.

== Disappearance ==
Soon after his arrival on Oahu in April 1941, Latimore, who was described as a quiet, solitary man, began to enjoy hiking in the undeveloped Aiea Mountain Range that overlooked Pearl Harbor (at 21.3859°N 157.930927°W). Soon afterwards, a Yeoman Second Class, Kenneth Isaacs, who was assigned to Dobbin, recalled that Latimore "came back to the ship, and he had an arm wound which he said he hurt in a fall. For a while he had an arm in a cast."

By July 1941, the arm had healed and the cast had been removed. 51 year-old Latimore was last seen heading into the Aiea Mountains wearing his khaki uniform, an old hat and a walking stick.

When he failed to return, hundreds of sailors and local police scoured the Aiea Mountains looking for him. Trackers with dogs were brought in from Schofield Barracks but no trace of Latimore was ever found. A Naval investigation into his disappearance was launched in 1941. His disappearance was never explained and was the subject of much local news coverage and rumor before being overshadowed by the Pearl Harbor attack.

On 19 July 1942 he was officially declared dead.

== U.S. Naval rumors ==
- Within the Navy, some initially believed he might have been abducted and killed by a local Hawaiian Japanese spy ring because he had either stumbled upon their activities in the hills or had been specifically targeted because of his Intelligence background.
- Another popular naval conspiracy theory involved United States President Franklin D. Roosevelt, who some claim allowed the attack on Pearl Harbor to happen in order to galvanize the American public into war. Latimore supposedly had forewarning of the attack from his Naval Intelligence contacts and decided to disappear before the Japanese strike.

== See also ==
- List of people who disappeared
