= Wailua Valley State Wayside Park =

Protected area on the island of Maui, in Hawaii

Coordinates: 20.840092°N 156.140065°W

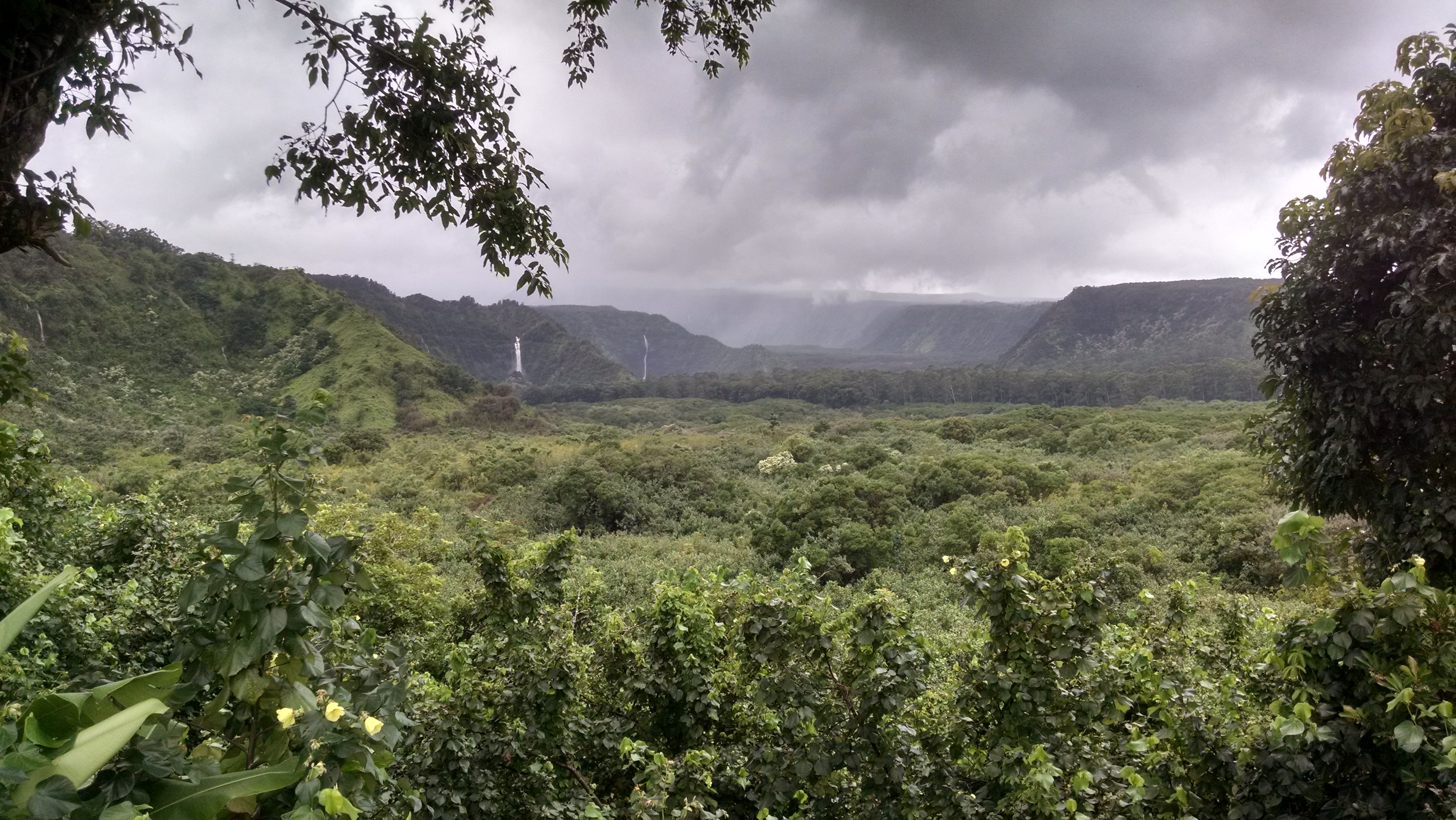
View from Wailua Valley State Wayside Park

Wailua Valley State Wayside Park is located 31 miles east of Kahului, Maui. The lookout provides views into Keʻanae Valley. From the park you can view waterfalls, the Koʻolau Gap, Wailua Peninsula and the rim of Haleakalā Crater.

== See also ==
- List of Hawaii state parks
