= Kaumahina State Wayside Park =

State park in Maui County, Hawaii, United States

Coordinates: 20.8742°N 156.1725°W

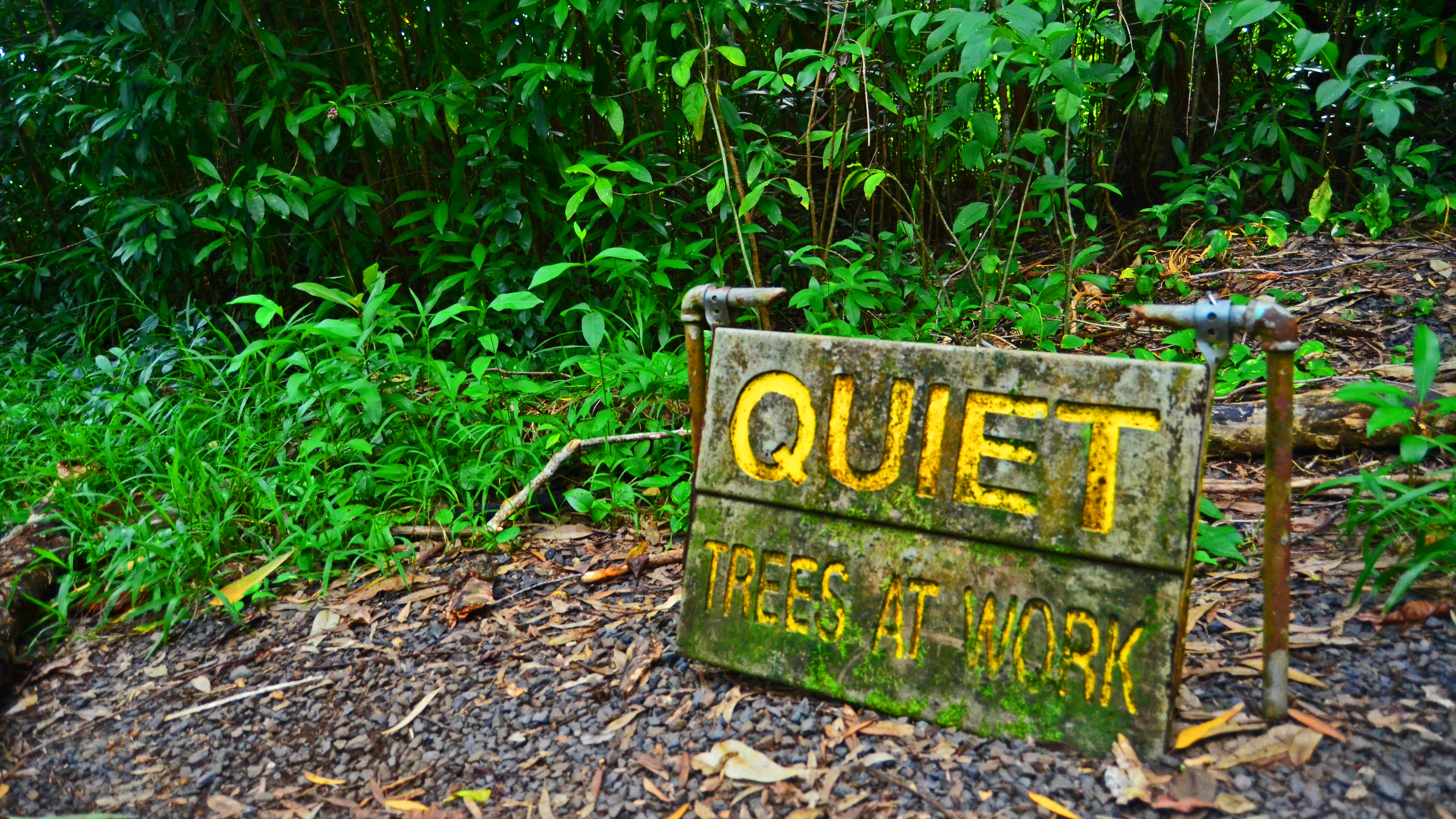
Kaumahina State Wayside Park

Kaumahina State Wayside Park or Kaumahina State Park, is located in Maui County, Hawaii, 28.3 miles (45.5 km) East of Kahului and 22.4 miles (36.0 km) West of Hana along the Hana Highway. The park consists of 7.8 acres (32,000 m^{2}) of forest and exotic plants. Amenities include a rest stop and scenic views of the northeast Maui coastline and Ke'anae Peninsula.

== See also ==
List of Hawaii state parks
