= Scott G. Gier =

American science fiction author (born 1948)

- Born: January 13, 1948 (age 78); Aiea, Hawaii
- Education: United States Naval Academy
- Occupation: Writer
- Writing career
- Genre: Science fiction

Scott G. Gier (born January 13, 1948) is an American science fiction author.

He was born in Aiea, Hawaii. Gier graduated from the US Naval Academy and served 6 years in the United States Navy as a pilot and intelligence analyst. After getting out of the Navy in 1975, he worked in the San Francisco Bay Area in laser (Spectra-Physics) and start-up computer manufacturing (GRiD Systems and Silicon Solutions) before switching to web-based and enterprise software support and training. He started writing his books in 1989 during a layoff.

In 1996, Gier was a nominee for the John W. Campbell Award for Best New Writer. Genellan: Planetfall was selected the Del Rey Books Discovery of the Year in 1996 as well as finishing in ninth place for Locus Magazine's Best First Novel award.

Genellan: Planetfall and Genellan: In the Shadow of the Moon were also both selected as Science Fiction Book Club selections.

== Bibliography ==
- Genellan: Planetfall (1995)
- Genellan: In the Shadow of the Moon (1996)
- Genellan: First Victory (1997)
- Genellan: Earth Siege (2005)
- Daystar (2007)
