= Sacred Falls State Park =

Closed park in Hawaii and site of an accident in 1999

- IUCN category II (national park)
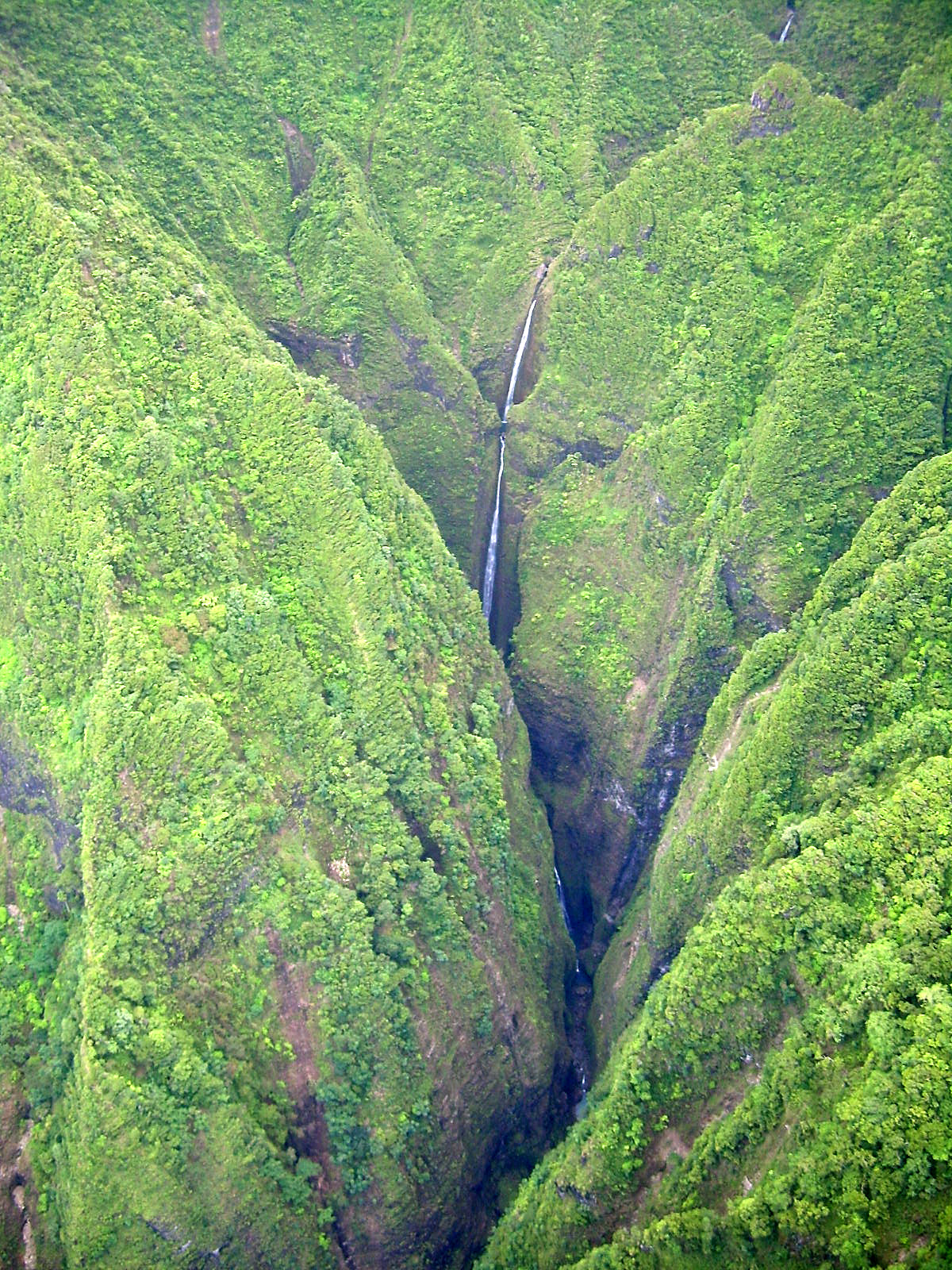
- Aerial view of Sacred Falls

- Location within Hawaii
- Location: Hau'ula, Hawaii, Hawaii, United States
- Coordinates: 21°34′24″N 157°54′51″W
- Area: 1,370 acres (5.5 km^{2})
- Website: Dept of Land & Natural Resources

Sacred Falls State Park (traditionally named Kaliuwaʻa in Hawaiian) is a closed state park located in Hauʻula on the North Shore of the Hawaiian island of Oʻahu. It has been closed since the rockfall that occurred on Mother's Day in 1999. Although people caught entering the park are subject to hefty fines, hikers continue to trespass into the park. The park encompasses Kaluanui gulch and the waterfalls at its end. It is a wahi pana in the district (moku) of Koʻolauloa, with much associated Hawaiian lore:

"Kaliuwaa (sic) is the most famous of all the valleys in the district of Koolauloa."

According to Hawaiian beliefs, visitors were encouraged to lay leaves and place stones on them, as they entered the valley, gorge, and falls to show respect to the demigod associated with the location.

== Definition ==
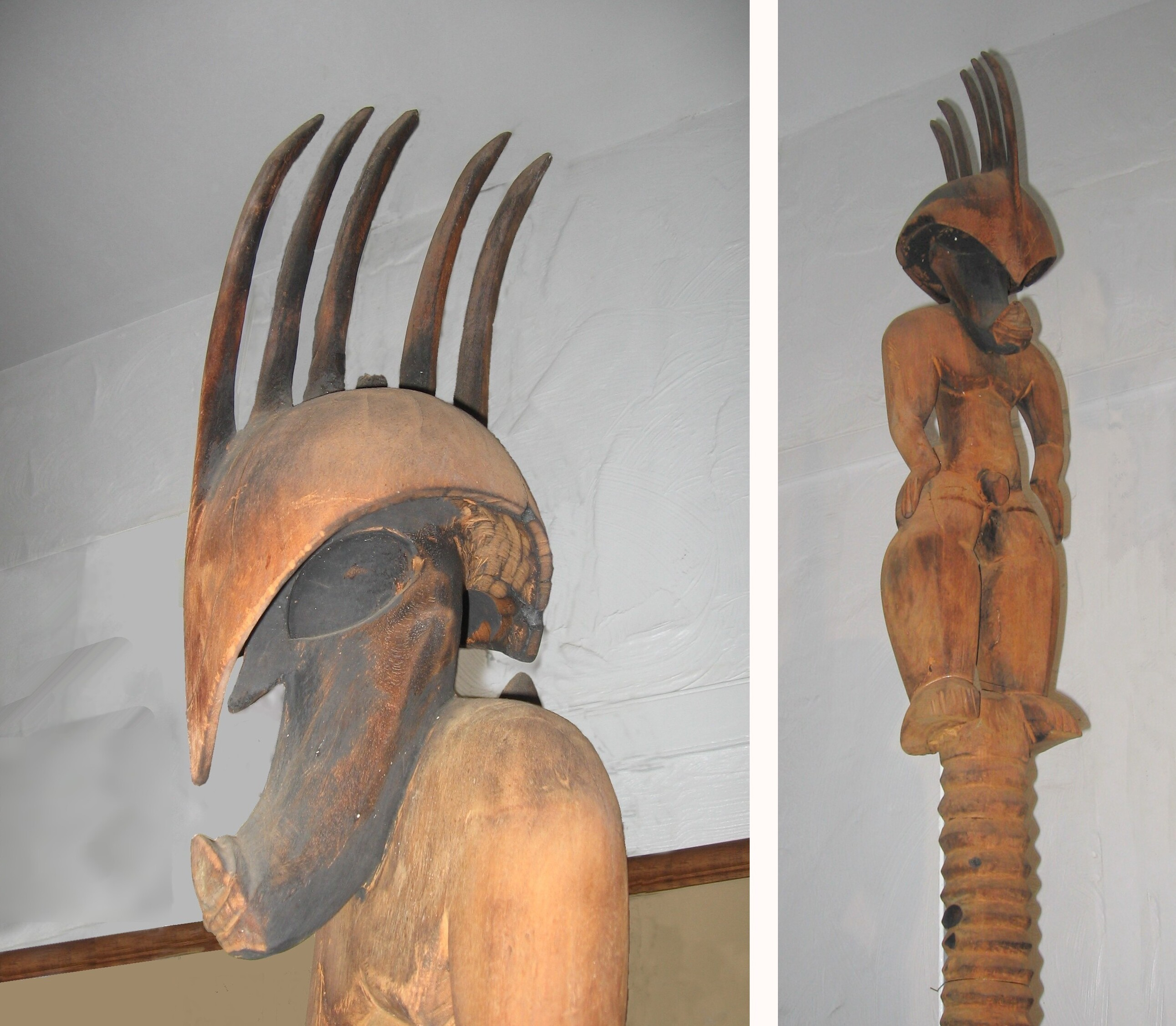
Kamapua'a, demigod, wood sculpture

Kaliuwaʻa, also known as Sacred Falls, is the valley, the perpendicular cliffs, streams, and falls (Sacred Falls), located in Kaluanui, near Hauʻula, Oʻahu. A short distance below the falls is a trough-like gouge up the cliff where the pig demigod, Kamapuaʻa, is believed to have leaned against the cliff so that members of his family might climb up his body and escape their enemies. The stream and valley are also called Kaluanui. The story of how Kamapua‘a and his people escaped from the ruling chief of the Ko‘olauloa and Ko‘olaupoko Districts, known as ‘Olopana, is how Sacred Falls received its traditional Hawaiian name. According to Hawaiian folklore, Kamapua‘a was known for being mischievous. Kamapua‘a frequently stole poultry from the ruling chief of the Ko‘olau districts and tore up the potato and taro plantations that were under the jurisdiction of ‘Olopana. The story goes that ‘Olopana and his army marched to Kaliuwa‘a to deal with Kamapua‘a. When ‘Olopana and his army reached the shoreside of Kaluanui, the demigod lay rested by a rock near his Grandmother Kamaunuaniho’s House up in Kaliuwa‘a valley. After being found by some men from ‘Olopana’s army, Kamapua‘a compliantly goes with them. When Kamapua‘a knew he was far enough away from his grandmother, as to not make her a witness of such violence and carnage, and was in closer proximity to the main part of ‘Olopana's army, he decimated a large part of the army. ‘Olopana and a few of his men were able to escape, only to later return with a larger army. Up into Kaliuwa‘a valley, where Kaliuwa‘a falls stands, Kamapua‘a would lead his grandmother and his people in order to find complete safety in the unreachable upper tablelands above the ravine. To do this, Kamapua‘a would transform into his non-human pig form, lean his back against the perpendicular face of the steep wall of the falls, put his people and his grandma on his back, and enlarge & elongate his body in order to raise them to the upper tablelands of the ravine. At the ravine, there can be seen two hollowed out depressions said to be made from the pressure of the demigod’s body on the walls as he enlarged. The depressions resemble two canoes that look like they are standing on end, and for that reason, it was given the name Kaliuwa‘a (liu meaning prepared or ready and wa‘a meaning canoe).

== Traditional location ==
Although Kaliuwa'a resides in what is now known as Hau'ula, Kaliuwa'a was traditionally located in the ahupua'a, or the third level of Hawaiian district, known as Kaluanui. Traditionally, Hawai‘i had its own district system with four main levels of districts, or divisions of land. The first level and largest division of land was called “mokupuni” which translates to island. Kaliuwa‘a can be found on the mokupuni of O‘ahu. The second level and next division of land was referred to as “moku” which roughly translates to district. O‘ahu has 6 moku. The moku of O‘ahu are Kona, Ko‘olauloa, Ko‘olaupoko, Wahiawa, Wai‘anae, and ‘Ewa to which Kaliuwa‘a can be found in the moku of Ko‘olauloa. The third level of land division was the “ahupua‘a” which consists of a strip of land from the mountain to the sea containing all the resources for a complete subsistence lifestyle in old traditional Hawaiian times. Each moku consisted of several ahupua‘a; for example, the ahupua'a of Ko‘olauloa from Northwest to Southeast respectively includes Keahuohapu‘u, Pūpūkea, Paumalū, Peapueo, Kaunala, ‘Ōpana, Kawela, Hanaka‘oe, Kahuku/Ahamanu, Keana, Mālaekahana, Lā‘iewai, Laniloa, Lā‘iemalo‘o, Kaipapa‘u, Hau‘ula, Lanakila, Mākao, Kapaka, Kaluanui, Punalu‘u/Moa‘e, Kahana/‘Āhiu, Ka‘a‘awa/Holopali, and Ka‘ō‘io. The ahupua‘a to which Kaliuwa‘a traditionally belongs is Kaluanui. The last level and smallest division of land is the “‘ili”. There are many ‘ili within an ahupua'a and in some cases there are smaller divisions of land than the ‘ili. This last division of land is best understood through the concepts of towns, communities, and neighborhoods. The moku of Ko‘olauloa, which Kaliuwa'a belongs to, is known for its deep valleys and narrow coastlines. In this traditional Hawaiian district, the northern half was backed by low mountains leading it to possess a relatively dry climate. Nonetheless, springs in the northern half of Ko‘olauloa allowed pre-European contact Hawaiians the ability to produce many aqua-cultural and agricultural terraces. In the southern half of the Ko‘olauloa district, moist trade winds driving up against the steep windward cliffs become rain that feeds the large streams. The streams such as those of Kaluanui including those of Kaliuwa'a gave pre-European contact Hawaiians the ability to produce extensive agricultural/aqua-cultural terraces in areas around Kaluanui, Punalu‘u, Kahana, and Ka‘a‘awa. The springs, streams, pools, agriculture, and aquaculture of Ko‘olauloa moku, especially Kaluanui ahupua‘a, paired with its steep/weathered cliffs and gusting rain/thunder, gave way to many famous legends and folklore. The best example of such legends and folklore are of the infamous demigod Kampua‘a. There are many locations around Kaluanui ahupua‘a, as well as the mokupuni of Hawai'i, that are associated with Kamapu‘a and his life beyond his conflicts with the chief ‘Olopana.

== Rockfalls lead to closure ==
Over twenty incidents where people (tourists and locals) had been killed or injured had already occurred at Sacred Falls before a fatal rockfall near the waterfall on May 9, 1999 killed eight hikers and injured at least 30 others. First responders slowly carried the victims 2.2 miles out of the park. The landslide that led to the official closure occurred without a trigger from any discernible conditions, but a host of reasons went into the decision to permanently close the park. The walls of Kaluanui Gulch all the way to the basin of Kaliuwa‘a falls show ample evidence of rock falls over a long period of time. Walls of these gulches typically become covered with vegetation such as thin layers of fungus/lichen or thick shrubbery, where exposed fresh rock is evidence of areas of rock fall. Two landside specialists from the United States Geological Survey Hazards Team in Golden Colorado reported many scars of fresh rock which appeared to be relatively recent to the incident of May 9, as well as many older scars. The geologists' findings suggested that the Sacred Falls landslide of May 9 was of typical size and form and that the decreased stability within the walls of the gulch from all the scars would most likely cause more landslides to eventually fall again. Taking into account that there are many rock fall deposits throughout the valley, that the valley bottom is an average 50–100 feet wide, and that the slope material is volcanic rock which gets very weathered, the biologist concluded Sacred Falls State Park to be at risk for potential harm from landslide hazards in the long-term. In addition, the steep and narrow canyon environment makes traditional methods to mitigate rock-fall not viable. The final decision by the Mayor of O‘ahu was to permanently close the park.

== Prohibited access ==
While state officials employ many tactics to discourage visitors from illegally entering the closed park, many people disregard the danger and the warnings and say people should be allowed to go there "at their own risk" while others acknowledge the risk.

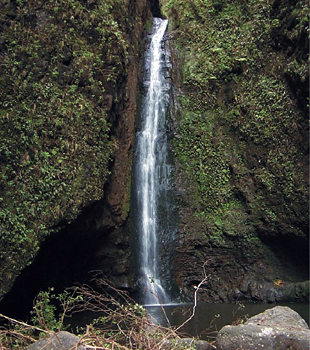
Kaliuwaʻa (Sacred Falls)

Because of the danger to first responders and to the public, the Hawaii Dept. of Land and Natural Resources, Division of Conservation and Resources Enforcement (DOCARE) has been strictly enforcing and citing people $2,500 for a first violation of entering the closed park, $5,000 for a second violation, and $10,000 for the third violation. The signs posted at the entrance of the park have a QR code, targeting smart phone users, who can scan the QR code and watch a video detailing information about the location, on their mobile device.
