= Kalōpā State Recreation Area =

State park in Hawaiʻi

Coordinates: 20°2′19″N 155°26′20″W

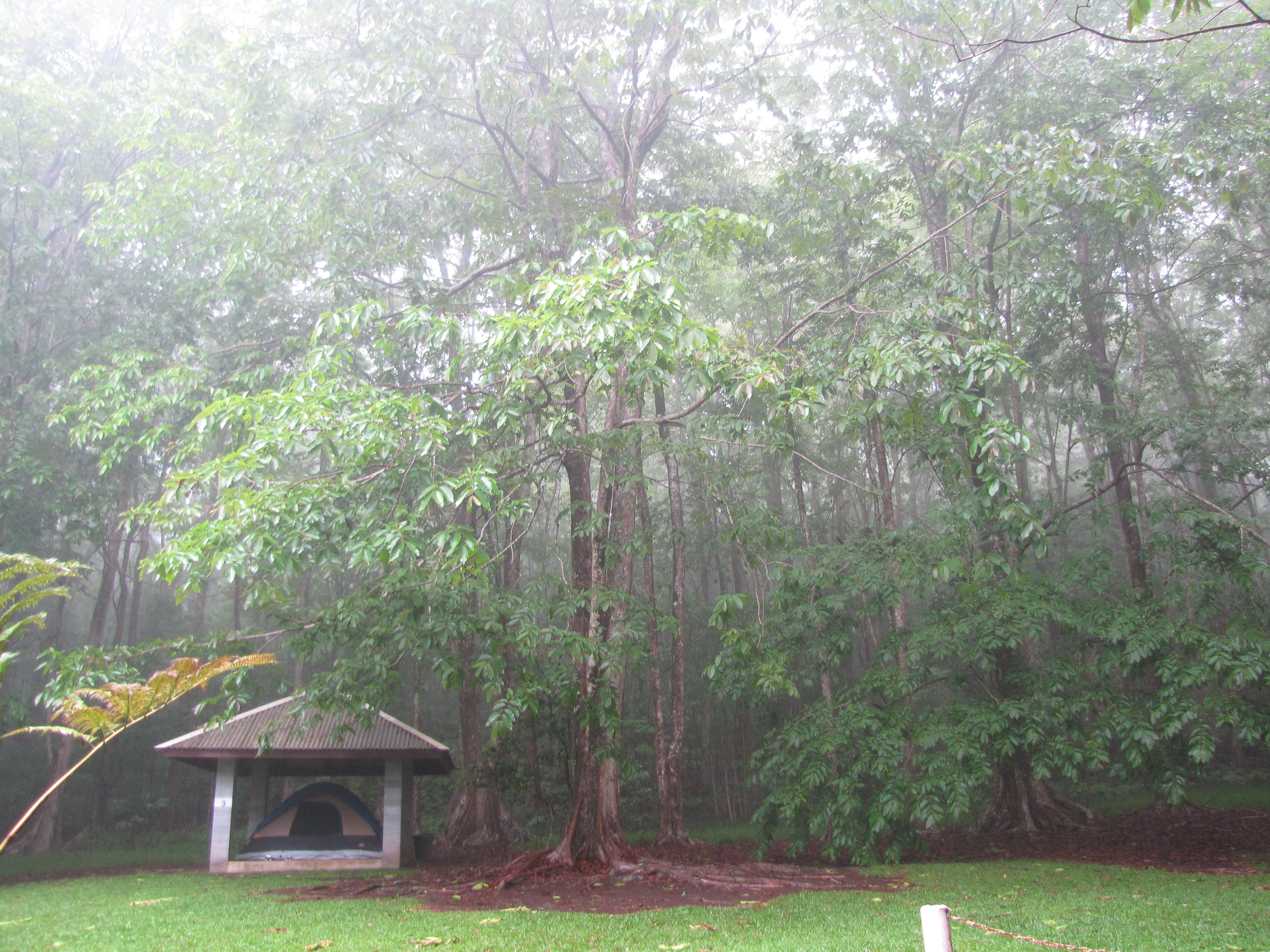
- One of the campsites located in the park.
- Interactive map of Kalōpā State Recreation Area
- Website: Official website

The Kalōpā Native Forest State Park and Recreation Area is a state park with an arboretum of native trees located approximately 40 mi (64 km) northwest of Hilo, near the village of Honokaʻa, a few miles inland from the Mamalahoa Highway (Route 19) section of the Hawaii Belt Road, Island of Hawaiʻi, Hawaiʻi.

This 100-acre (40 ha) park adjoins an additional 500 acres (200 ha) in the Kalopa Forest Reserve. The park is at an elevation of 2,000 ft (610 m) and includes a 0.7 mi (1.1 km) loop through a forest of native ʻōhiʻa lehua (Metrosideros polymorpha) trees. A number of rare plants can be found in the arboretum area, including endangered loulu palms (Pritchardia spp.), as well as a number of rare native hibiscus. Due to the altitude, damp and chilly weather is the norm.

Services available at the park include restrooms, drinking water, cabins, and camping.

== See also ==
- List of botanical gardens in the United States
