= Onizuka Center for International Astronomy =

Support facilities for the Mauna Kea Observatory in Hawaii, US

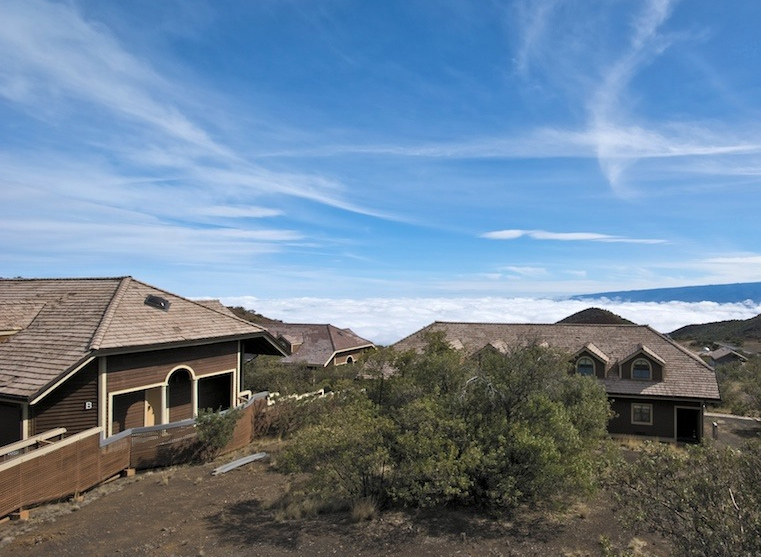
Dormitories at the center

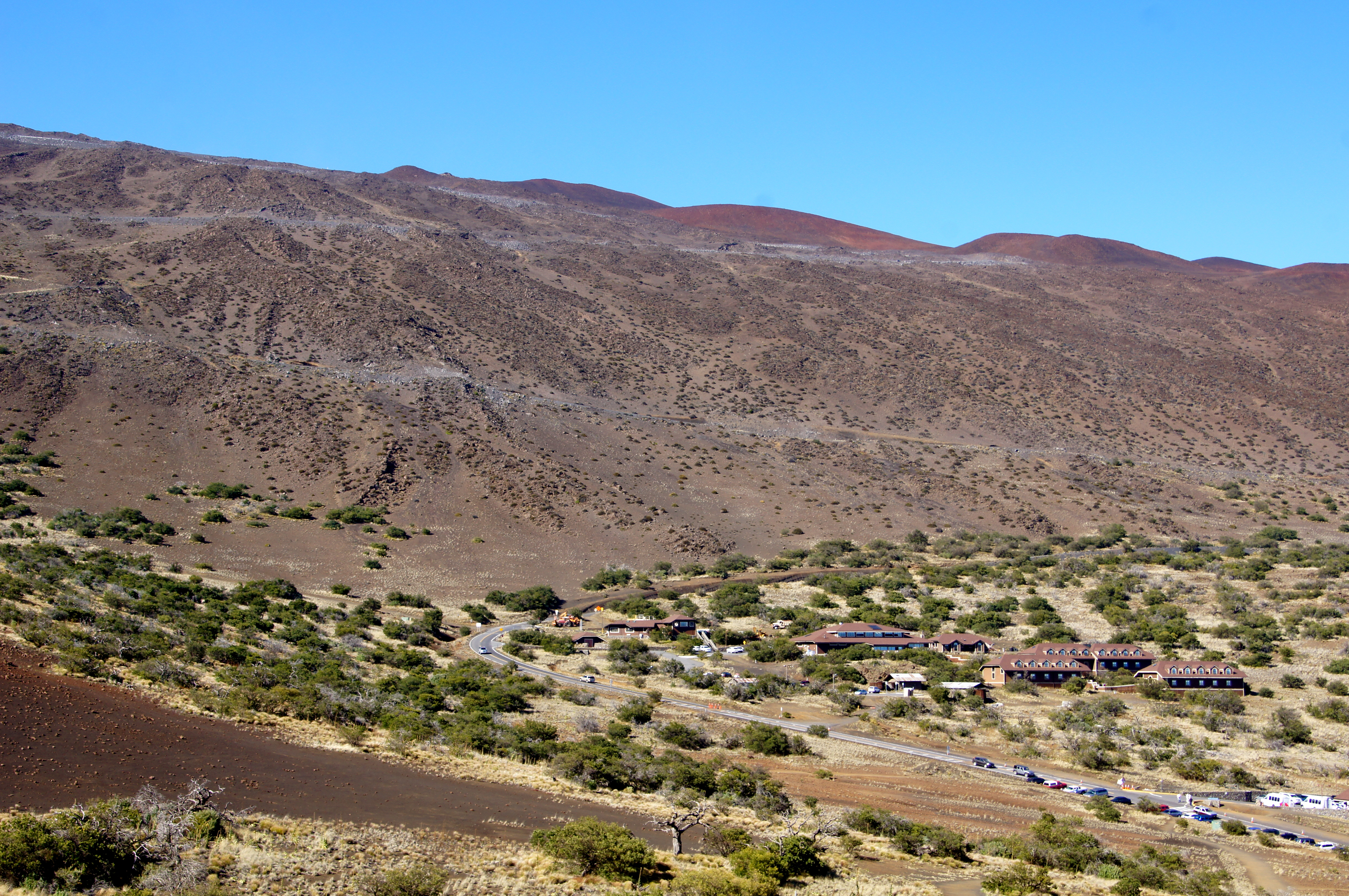
A view of the Onizuka Center for International Astronomy Visitor Information Station on the ascent of Mauna Kea, taken from a Pu'u at the 9300 ft. level.

The Onizuka Center for International Astronomy, also known as Hale Pōhaku, is a complex of support facilities for the telescopes and other instruments that comprise the Mauna Kea Observatory atop Mauna Kea, on Hawaiʻi island.

== History ==
A few rustic cabins named Hale Pōhaku (which means "stone house" in the Hawaiian language) were built by the Civilian Conservation Corps on the southern slope of Mauna Kea in the 1930s for hunters and other explorers. A rough jeep trail was built in 1964 under Governor John A. Burns, and a small telescope determined that Mauna Kea would be an ideal place for an astronomical observatory. The Hale Pōhaku area was used as a construction camp for the building of the observatories through the 1970s, and the road realigned in 1975. A permanent complex of buildings was constructed in 1983 known as the Mid-Level Facility.

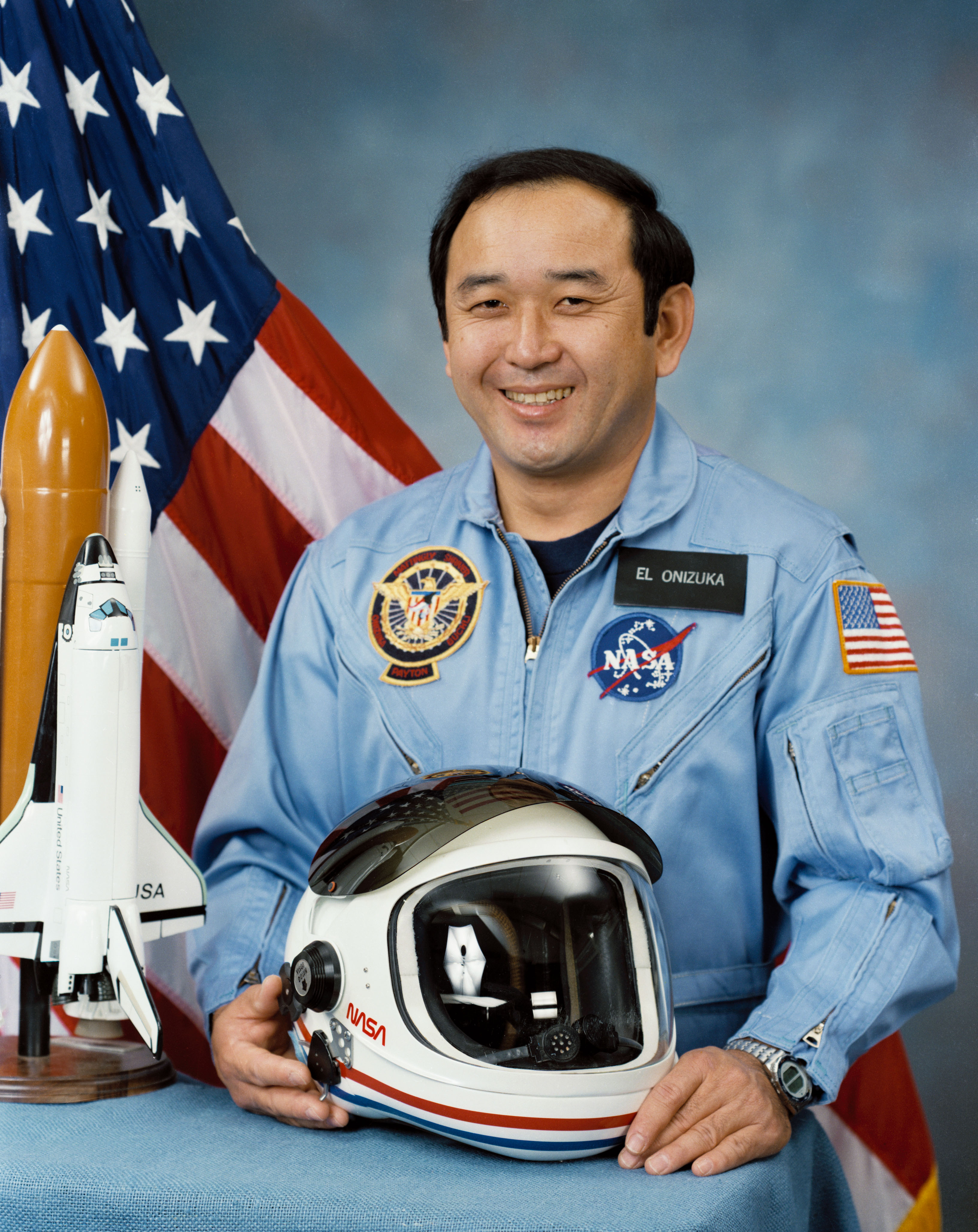
Astronaut Ellison Shoji Onizuka (1946–1986)

The Mid-Level Facility was renamed for the Hawaiʻi-born astronaut Ellison Onizuka, who died in the Space Shuttle Challenger disaster in 1986. It is located at the 9,300-foot (2,800 m) elevation, south of the summit at 19°45′41″N 155°27′22″W, up Mauna Kea Access Road from the Saddle Road (Route 200).

The center consists of dormitories with sleeping accommodation for 72, as well as a main building which houses the shared facilities such as cafeteria, laundry, and common room. Astronomers or technicians normally spend up to 24 hours at Hale Pōhaku to acclimatize to the altitude, before proceeding to the summit at almost 14,000 feet (4,300 m). There is no admission to these support facilities for the general public. The center is operated by the Institute for Astronomy of the University of Hawaii.

The harsh conditions of the observatories require ongoing maintenance, with technicians and construction workers being common residents. Originally any astronomer wishing to use the observatory needed to stay at these facilities to physically be present during the nights they were assigned to use the telescopes. Although first-time users of the observatories are still encouraged to actually travel to the summit to familiarize themselves with the instruments, most observations can now be done over the Internet. Often the work is done in teams, with a staff of two at the summit, and others connected by teleconference at Hale Pōhaku, the University of Hawaii at Hilo, University of Hawaii at Manoa, or the researcher's office. W. M. Keck Observatory reported 90% of observations were remote by 2002, many from their facility in Waimea, on the plateau north of the mountain, and automation allowed control from California.

== Visitors ==
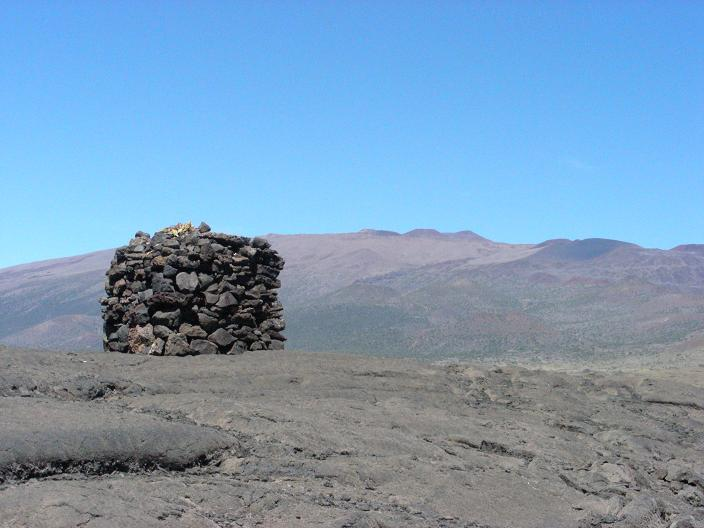
A traditional Hawaiian altar on the Saddle Road near the Mauna Kea access road

Just below the support complex, a Visitor Information Station at 19°45′33″N 155°27′22″W, has its own parking lot for visitors. The VIS houses informational displays, and shows videos depicting the history and work of the observatories, as well as the geology, ecology and cultural significance of Mauna Kea. A VIS staff member or volunteer usually presents a star and constellation tour, using a small laser to point out features in the sky. Amateur astronomers also come here to set up their own telescopes, since the altitude is already high enough for the seeing to be much better than at lower elevations.

The Onizuka Center is at the end of the paved road, and the farthest a typical car should go towards the summit. As of 2025, visitors wishing to continue on the steep and twisting gravel road to the summit are required to bring four wheel drive vehicles with well-maintained brakes. Since conditions can change quickly, visitors are advised to get up-to-date information before going beyond the Visitor Information Station.

Those who do intend to visit the summit are also strongly advised to spend at least half an hour, or better three or four hours, at the mid-level in order to acclimatize to the higher elevation, and so reduce the possibility of suffering potentially dangerous altitude sickness. Further below the visitor station is a camp for construction workers. The three facilities are kept separate because scientists generally work at the summit during night hours and need to sleep during the day, while construction and tours are restricted to daylight hours.

== Related sites ==
The Keck Observatory on the summit has a visitor gallery which is usually open between 10am and 4pm on weekdays, and free tours of the Subaru Telescope can be reserved on its web site, but otherwise only observatory staff and visiting scientists are allowed inside observatory facilities. Some commercial tours continue from the center to the summit daily, from morning twilight before sunrise until it is closed to the public after sunset. Other Mauna Kea recreation opportunities include Mauna Kea State Recreation Area, and the Mauna Kea Trail which leads from the VIS through the Mauna Kea Ice Age Reserve to the summit. A small museum dedicated to Onizuka, scheduled to close in March 2016, is located at the Kona International Airport. The ʻImiloa Astronomy Center in Hilo on the University of Hawaii at Hilo campus includes a larger museum and planetarium that is more easily accessible to visitors.
