= Natural Area Reserves System Hawaii =

Statewide preservation initiative in Hawaii, US

The Natural Area Reserves System (NARS) of Hawaii is a statewide attempt to preserve in perpetuity, as relatively unmodified as possible, specific land and water areas which support communities of the natural flora and fauna, as well as the geological sites, of Hawaii.

== History ==
Established in 1970 by Hawaii Revised Statutes Chapter 195, the system presently consists of 19 reserves on five islands, encompassing more than 109,000 acres (440 km^{2}) of the State's ecosystems. The diverse areas found in the NARS range from marine and coastal environments to lava flows, tropical rainforests, and even an alpine desert. Within these areas one can find rare endemic plants and animals, many of which are on the edge of extinction.

The Natural Area Reserves System is administered by the Department of Land and Natural Resources, Division of Forestry and Wildlife. Currently, management teams are working to control the encroachment of non-native plants and animals which threaten the existence of the natural biota on the reserves.

The reserves include:

=== Hawaiʻi Island ===
- Kahaualeʻa on Kilauea
- Kipahoehoe on Mauna Loa
- Laupāhoehoe Natural Area Reserve on Mauna Kea
- Manuka
- Mauna Kea Ice Age on upper slope of Mauna Kea
- Puʻu Makaʻala
- Puʻu O ʻUmi above Waimanu Valley
- Waiakea 1942 Lava Flow above Hilo, Hawaii

=== Kauaʻi ===
- Hono O Na Pali
- Kuia

=== Maui ===
- West Maui
- Hanawi
- Kanaio
- Nakula
- ʻĀhihi-Kina‘u

=== Molokaʻi ===
- Olokuʻi
- Puʻu Aliʻi

=== Oʻahu ===
- Kaʻena Point
- Kaluanui
- Pahole
- Pia
- Kaʻala
