= Mauna Kea Ice Age Reserve =

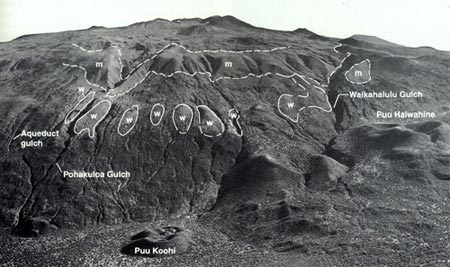
- Terminal moraines (m) and glacial till (w)
- Interactive map of Mauna Kea Ice Age Reserve
- Location: Island of Hawaiʻi
- Nearest city: Hilo, Hawaiʻi
- Area: 3,894 acres (1,576 ha)
- Established: 1981
- Governing body: State Reserve

The Mauna Kea Ice Age Natural Area Reserve is a Hawaii state natural reserve that includes the Mauna Kea Adz Quarry, on the southern slope of Mauna Kea on the island of the Hawaiʻi.

== Location ==
The reserve is accessed from the Saddle Road (Hawaii Route 200), about 24 miles (39 km) northwest of Hilo. At 19°41′21″N 155°27′59″W, the Mauna Kea access road leads to the north at about 6,600 feet (2,000 m) elevation. The road was unofficially named for John A. Burns who was Governor of Hawaii when it was built in 1964. The land is part of the Natural Area Reserves System administered by the Hawaiʻi Department of Land and Natural Resources. The reserve lies above the Onizuka Center for International Astronomy, to the west of the road starting at an elevation of about 10,000 feet (3,000 m) at 19°46′10″N 155°27′47″W. It extends to just below the summit area of Mauna Kea Observatory, at about 13,000 feet (4,000 m) elevation at 19°49′9″N 155°28′28″W. The 3,894-acre (1,576 ha) reserve was established in 1981.

In 1998, the area leased to the Mauna Kea Observatory (called the Kea Science Reserve) was modified to exclude the Ice Age reserve. Another small parcel surrounding the rocky cinder cone called Puʻu Pōhaku at 19°49′31″N 155°29′28″W, contains a rare example of permafrost in the tropics. A 2004 study found the rare wēkiu bug (Nysius wekiuicola) in the reserve.

- Mauna Kea Adz Quarry
- U.S. National Register of Historic Places
- U.S. National Historic Landmark
- Location within Hawaii
- Nearest city: Hilo, Hawaii
- Area: 2 acres (0.81 ha)
- NRHP reference No.: 66000285

Significant dates
- Added to NRHP: October 15, 1966
- Designated NHL: December 29, 1962

== Quarry ==
The quarry was used by prehistoric Hawaiians to obtain basalt for stone tools including blades for adzes. Located near the summit of Mauna Kea at an elevation above 12,000 feet (3,700 m) at 19°48′1″N 155°28′4″W along the Mauna Kea Trail, this is the largest primitive quarry in the world. The archaeological complex also includes religious shrines, trails, rock shelters, and petroglyphs. The Hawaiian language name for the quarry was Keanakākoʻi.

On December 29, 1962, the quarry was added to the list of National Historic Landmarks in Hawaii. On October 15, 1966 it was added to the National Register of Historic Places listings on the island of Hawaii as site 66000285. On May 21, 1981 it was added to the state register as site 10-23-4136.

Lake Waiau is located even further up the trail within the reserve.

== See also ==
- List of National Historic Landmarks in Hawaii
