= Mauna Kea Trail =

Hiking trail in Hawaii, United States

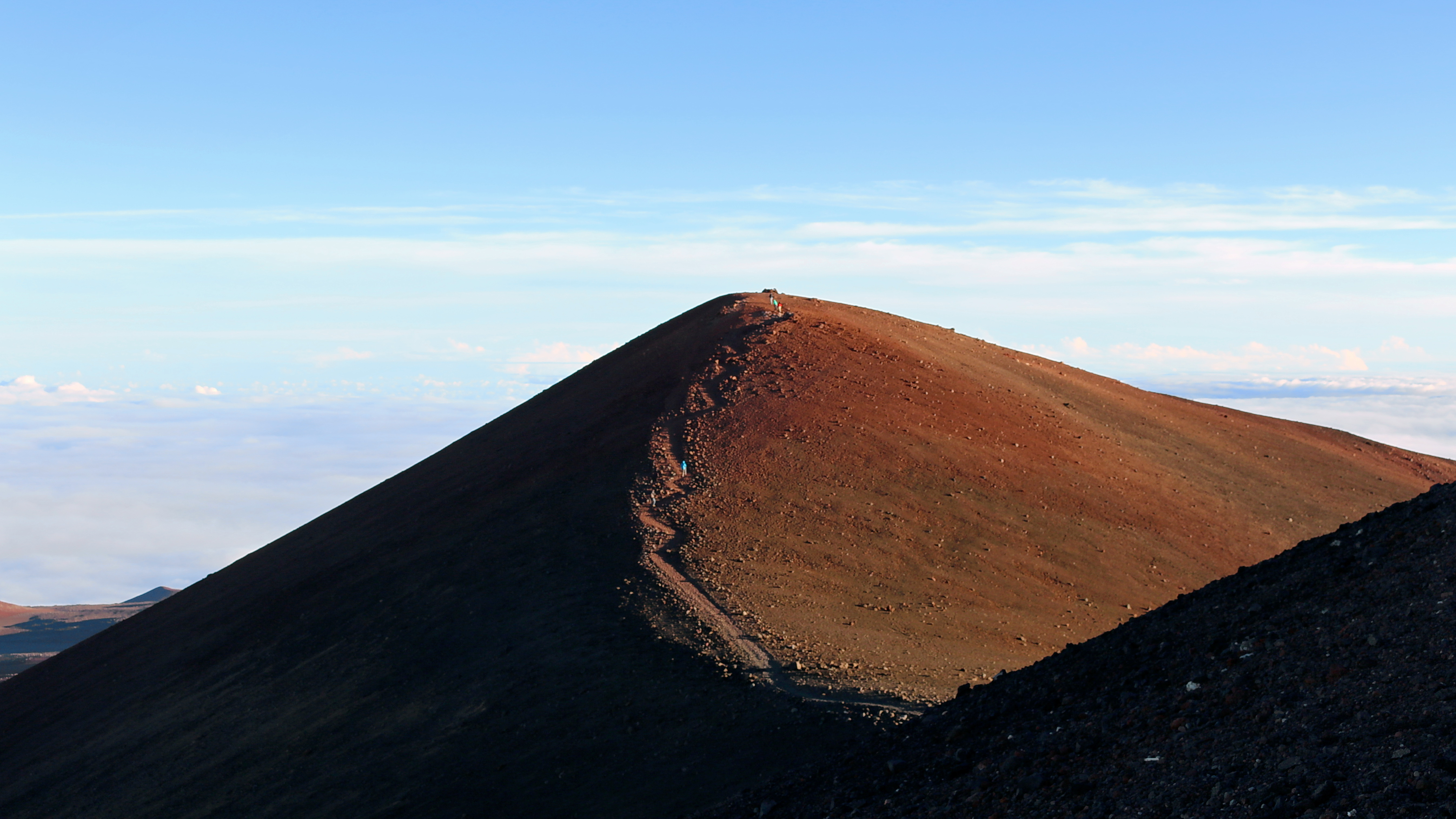
Final trail section to the summit of Mauna Kea

The Mauna Kea Trail, also known as the Humuʻula Trail, is a hiking route leading from the Onizuka Center for International Astronomy to the summit of Mauna Kea, the highest volcano on the island of Hawaiʻi.

== Description ==
The trail is a 6 mi (10 km) long, unmaintained dirt and scree path with two short road sections, about 600 ft (180 m) at the beginning and about 1 mi (1.6 km) near the summit. Cairns and reflective posts mark the route above 10,000 ft (3,000 m).

The summit region is typically very cold, and winter storms can deposit up to 2 ft (0.61 m) of snow in January and February. Astronomical instruments are located near the summit since the atmosphere is substantially thinner at higher elevations than at sea level. Mauna Loa is visible on clear days from the summit area, as well as along most of the trail.

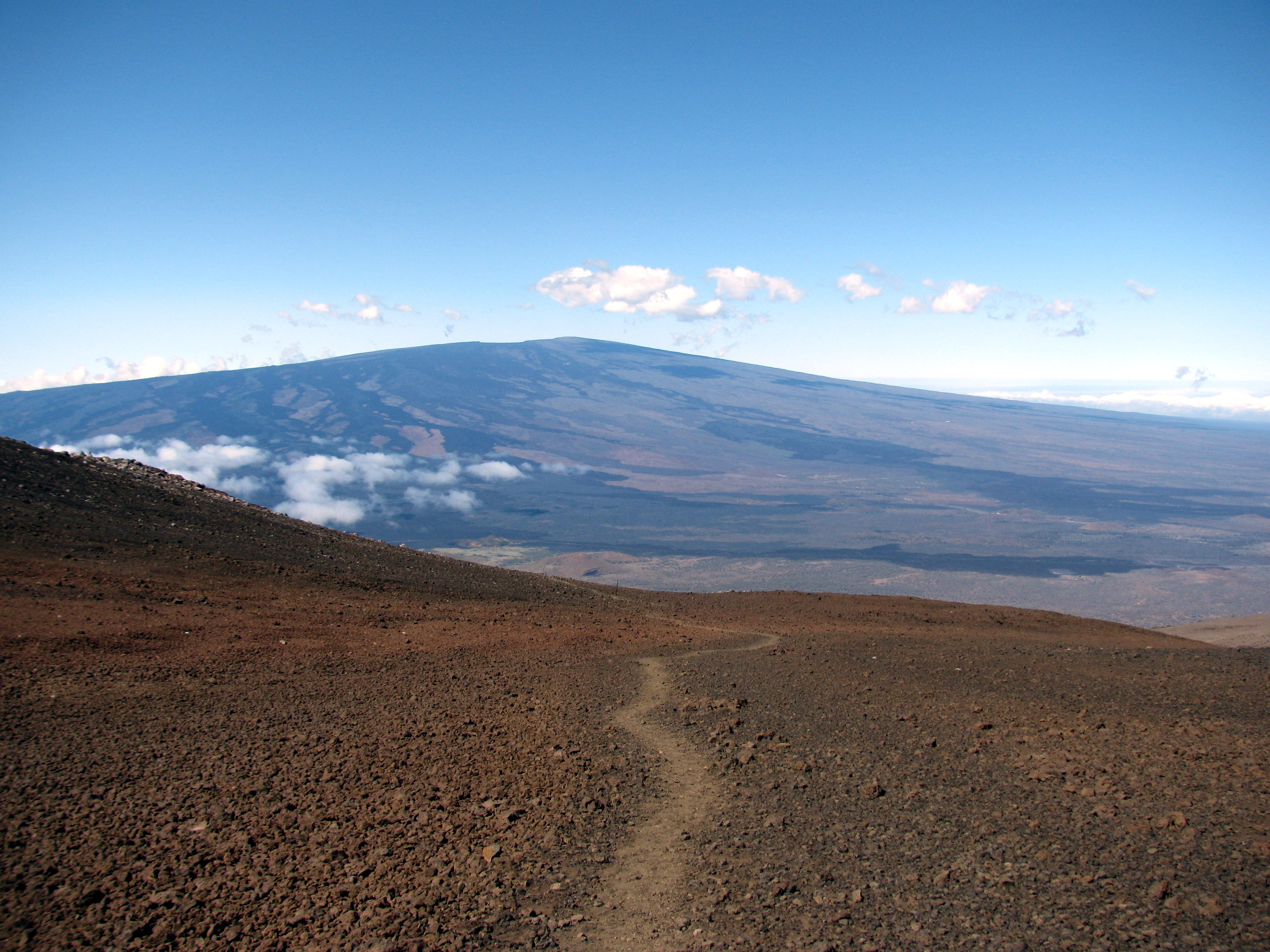
Mauna Loa from the Mauna Kea trail

The trailhead is located at the Visitor Information Station of the Onizuka Center at 9,200 ft (2,804 m) (19°45′42″N 155°27′22″W). The center is accessible by car from the Saddle Road (Hawaii Route 200) and then north on the Mauna Kea Access Road. Registration is requested and a drop box is available for hikers who start before the visitor center opens. The first 600 ft (180 m) of the trail is on the Mauna Kea Access Road after which the trail goes left onto a dirt path. From 10,000 to 11,000 ft (3,048 to 3,353 m) the path consists of scree. From 11,000 to 12,800 ft (3,353 to 3,901 m) the area is predominantly a'a lava flows and is not as steep. At 13,130 ft (4,002 m) the road forks, with one path going to Lake Waiau and the other fork to the summit. At 13,200 ft (4,023 m), the trail intersects and follows the Mauna Kea Access Road, including two switchbacks, to the Mauna Kea Observatories at 13,680 ft (4,170 m). A final trail segment leads to the summit.

Since the mountain is considered sacred to the Native Hawaiians, a sign is posted asking visitors to not access the summit cinder cone, which is named Puʻu Wekiu. The sign reads:

Aloha. Mauna Kea is historically, culturally and environmentally significant. Help preserve our cultural and natural landscape and show your respect by not hiking beyond this point to the summit.
