= Mauna Kea State Recreation Area =

Protected area in Hawai'i

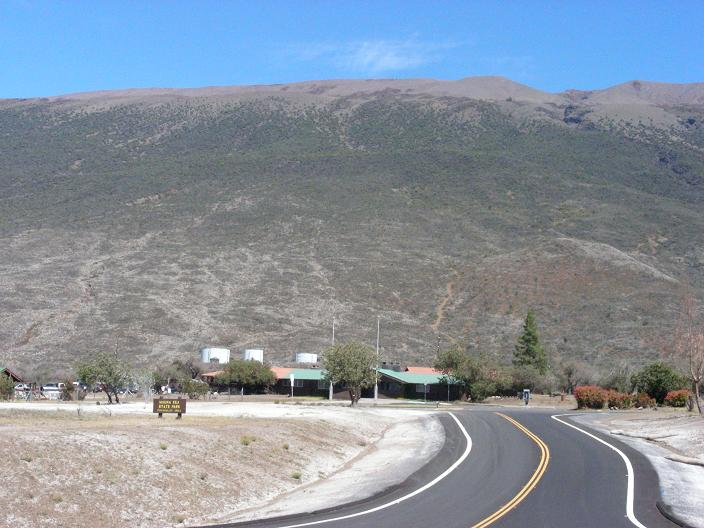
- Mauna Kea in background

- Location within Hawaii
- Location: Hawaii
- Coordinates: 19°44′57″N 155°31′35″W
- Area: 20.5 acres (8.3 ha)
- Governing body: State of Hawaii
- Website: web.archive.org/web/20070419215525/http://www.hawaiistateparks.org/parks/hawaii/maunakea.cfm

Mauna Kea State Recreation Area, also known as Mauna Kea State Park, is a state of Hawaii protected area at the southern base of Mauna Kea.

The 20.5-acre (8.3 ha) park is administered by the Hawai'i Department of Land and Natural Resources. The park is located on Saddle Road (Route 200) 35 miles (56 km) west of Hilo, at 19°44′57″N 155°31′35″W with about 6,500 feet (2,000 m) elevation. Facilities include restrooms, cabins and camping, trash cans, and a picnic area. As of 2010 water improvements are planned.

Wild pigs and sheep can be hunted in the area. The dry shrublands get cold at night due to the elevation. The nearby Bradshaw Field, a military airstrip on the Pohakuloa Training Area, and artillery practices can disturb the quiet of the site.

On August 18, 2009 Senator Daniel Inouye and other officials held a ceremony at the park marking the third phase of the realignment of the Saddle Road. The first three phases improved 22 miles of the 55-mile (89 km) road, through the 8 miles (13 km) west of the park and 14 miles (23 km) east of the park. On August 22, 2010, a fire broke out between the park and the training area. Dry conditions, strong winds, and steep terrain hampered fighting efforts, although military helicopters were used. The fire burned for over a week, with traffic diverted to the older saddle road and the park closed down.

In 2014, Hawaiʻi County took over management from the state in 2014 to improve the facilities.

== See also ==
- List of Hawaii state parks
