= Poliʻahu =

One of the four goddesses of Snow in Hawaiian mythology

- Goddess of snow
- Venerated in: Hawaiian religion
- Abode: Mauna Kea
- Enemy: Pele
- Gender: Female
- Consort: Aiwohikupua

In Hawaiian mythology, Poliʻahu (Cloaked bosom or temple bosom) is one of the four goddesses of snow, all enemies of Pele. She was thought to reside on Mauna Kea, which if measured from the seafloor is the world's tallest mountain.

== Legends ==
=== Aiwohikupua ===
Poliʻahu met the aliʻi Aiwohikupua on the Eastern slope of Mauna Kea. The two fell in love and Aiwohikupua took Poliʻahu home to his native Kauaʻi. There Poliʻahu discovered that the aliʻi was already betrothed to a princess of Maui. Poliʻahu left in dismay, but managed to first curse the betrothed. She first chilled the princess of Maui to the bone, then turned the cold into heat. Finally, the princess gave up and left him. Later Poliʻahu similarly cursed Aiwohikupua, freezing him to death. The four goddesses are defined by their otherworldly beauty. Poliʻahu is noted as Hawaii's most beautiful goddess.

=== Poliʻahu and Pele ===
Poliʻahu also engineered Hawaii's Hāmākua Coast.

Poliʻahu mingled with humans on the East slope of Mauna Kea. One day, while hōlua sledding with mortals, Poliʻahu was joined by a beautiful stranger who challenged her. The stranger had no sled, so she borrowed one to run against Poliʻahu.

In the first run, Poliʻahu easily passed the stranger. Graciously, Poliʻahu exchanged sleds with the stranger, before winning again. On the third run, the stranger tried to prevent Poliʻahu from winning by opening lava streams in front of her, revealing herself as the volcano goddess Pele.

Poliʻahu ran towards the top of the mountain, reeling from Pele's attack. Once she regained her composure, Poliʻahu threw snow at the lava and froze it, confining it to the island's Southern end. To this day, Pele is said to rule Kīlauea and Mauna Loa, but must submit to Poliʻahu on the northern end of the island.
