= Mauna Kea =

Hawaiian volcano

- Maunakea
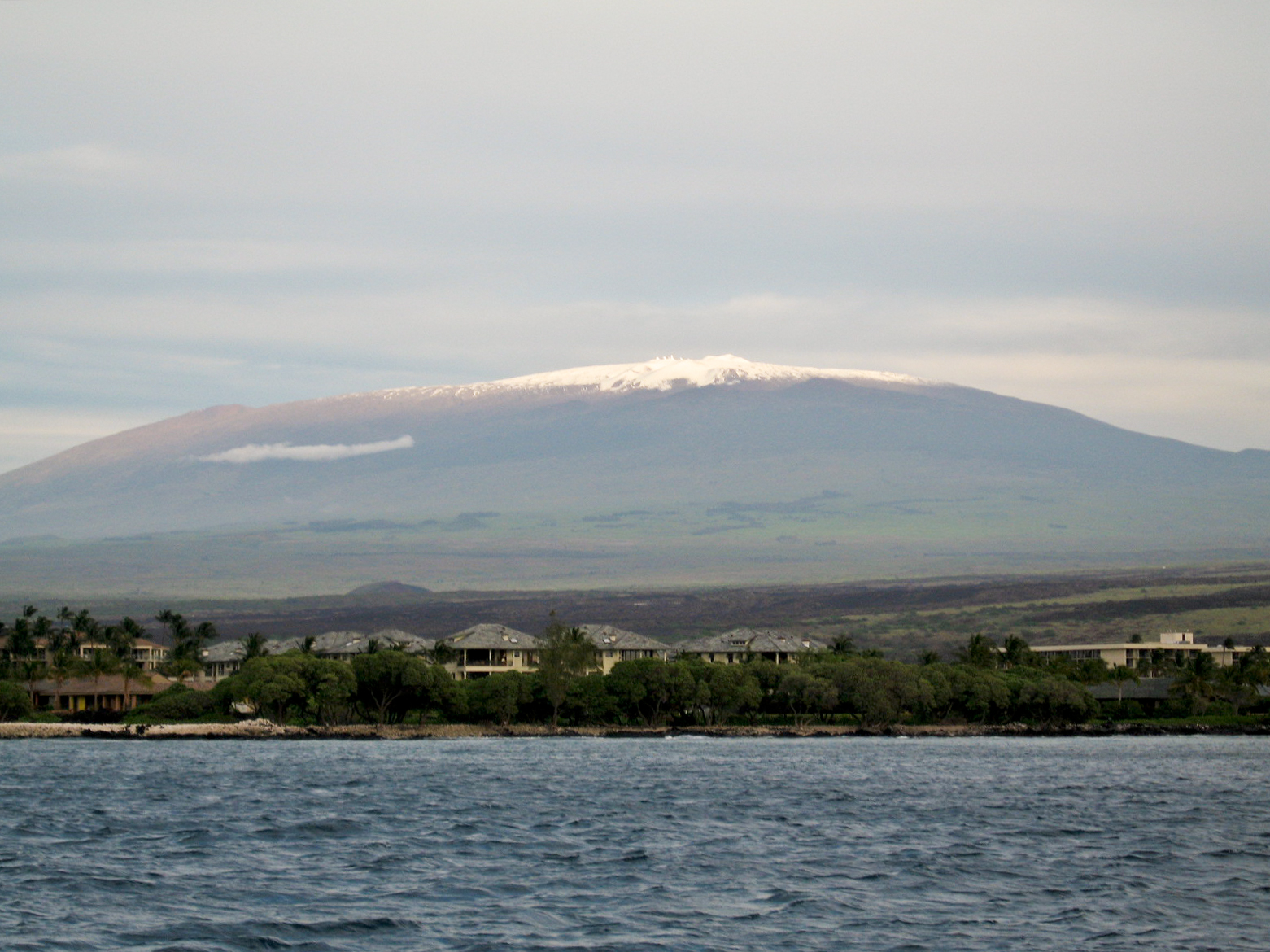
- Mauna Kea in December 2007, with its seasonal snow cap visible

Highest point
- Elevation: 13,803 ft (4,207 m)
- Prominence: 13,803 ft (4,207 m)
- Isolation: 2,453 mi (3,948 km)
- Listing: Highest ocean islands 2nd; World most prominent 15th; World most isolated peaks 8th; Oceania highest peaks 2nd; US highest major peaks 59th; US most prominent peaks 2nd; US most isolated peaks 2nd; US state high point 6th; Hawaii highest major peaks 1st
- Coordinates: 19°49′14″N 155°28′5″W

Geography
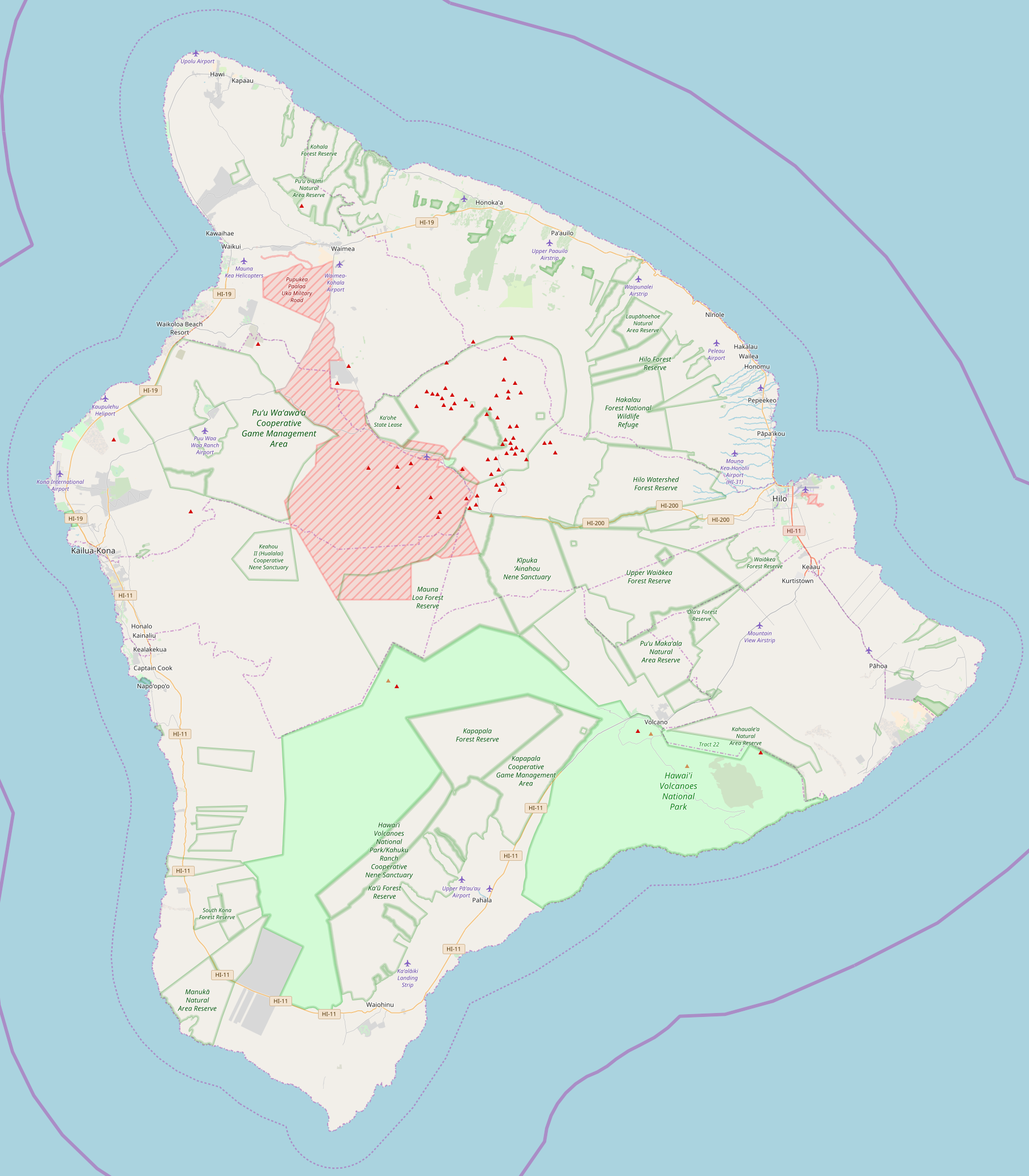
- Location within Hawaii (island) Location within Hawaii
- Location: Hawaiʻi County, Hawaiʻi, United States
- Parent range: Hawaiian Islands

Geology
- Rock age(s): Oldest dated rock: 237,000 ± 31,000 years BP; Approximate: ~1 million years
- Mountain type: Shield volcano
- Volcanic zone: Hawaiian–Emperor seamount chain
- Last eruption: 2460 BCE ± 100 years

Climbing
- First ascent: Recorded: Goodrich (1823)
- Easiest route: Mauna Kea Trail

U.S. National Natural Landmark
- Designated: November 1972

Mauna Kea (/ˌmɔːnə ˈkeɪə, ˌmaʊnə -/, Hawaiian: [ˈmɐwnə ˈkɛjə]; abbreviation for Mauna a Wākea, 'White Mountain') is a dormant shield volcano on the island of Hawaiʻi. Its peak is 13,803 feet (4,207.3 meters) above sea level, making it the highest point in Hawaii and the island with the second highest high point, behind New Guinea. The peak is about 125 ft (38 m) higher than Mauna Loa, its more massive neighbor. Mauna Kea is unusually topographically prominent for its height: its prominence from sea level is 15th in the world among mountains, at 13,803 ft (4,207.3 m); its prominence from under the ocean is 30,610 ft (9,330 m), rivaled only by Mount Everest. This dry prominence is greater than Everest's height above sea level of 8,848.86 metres or 29,031.7 feet, and some authorities have labeled Mauna Kea the tallest mountain in the world, from its underwater base. (Note: Such as National Geographic, Guinness World Records, and the U.S. Geological Survey. Definitions of base vary and it is less clearly defined than the concept of prominence. This is discussed further in the topographic prominence section of this article.) Mauna Kea is ranked 8th by topographic isolation.

It is about one million years old and thus passed the most active shield stage of life hundreds of thousands of years ago. In its current post-shield state, its lava is more viscous, resulting in a steeper profile. Late volcanism has also given it a much rougher appearance than its neighboring volcanoes due to construction of cinder cones, decentralization of its rift zones, glaciation on its peak, and weathering by the prevailing trade winds. Mauna Kea last erupted 6,000 to 4,000 years ago and is now thought to be dormant.

In Hawaiian religion, the peaks of the island of Hawaiʻi are sacred. An ancient law allowed only high-ranking aliʻi to visit its peak. Ancient Hawaiians living on the slopes of Mauna Kea relied on its extensive forests for food, and quarried the dense volcano-glacial basalts on its flanks for tool production. When Europeans arrived in the late 18th century, settlers introduced cattle, sheep, and game animals, many of which became feral and began to damage the volcano's ecological balance. Mauna Kea can be ecologically divided into three sections: an alpine climate at its summit, a Sophora chrysophylla–Myoporum sandwicense (or māmane–naio) forest on its flanks, and an Acacia koa–Metrosideros polymorpha (or koa–ʻōhiʻa) forest, now mostly cleared by the former sugar industry, at its base. In recent years, concern over the vulnerability of the native species has led to court cases that have forced the Hawaiʻi Department of Land and Natural Resources to work towards eradicating all feral species on the volcano.

With its high elevation, dry environment, and stable airflow, Mauna Kea's summit is one of the best sites in the world for astronomical observation. Since the creation of an access road in 1964, thirteen telescopes funded by eleven countries have been constructed at the summit. The Maunakea Observatories are used for scientific research across the electromagnetic spectrum and comprise the largest such facility in the world. Their construction on a landscape considered sacred by Native Hawaiians continues to be a topic of debate to this day.

== Topographic prominence ==
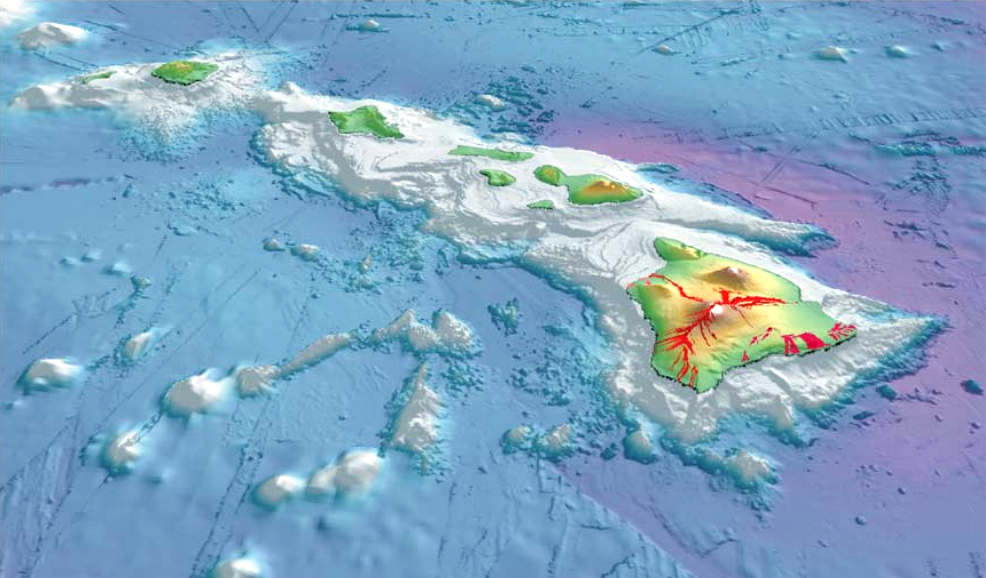
To illustrate Mauna Kea's dry prominence, imagine raising the sea level of the Pacific Ocean to submerge the top of Mauna Kea. Then slowly lower it again. The first thing to appear is the peak of Mauna Kea. Then Mauna Loa and peaks of the surrounding Hawaiian Islands will emerge from the ocean. If the ocean drains further, the island around Mauna Kea will grow and merge with the adjacent islands. Continue draining until a land bridge forms between the Hawaiian Islands and a continent so that it is possible to walk all the way there without getting wet. Stop draining at this point, and this bridge is the key col of a dry Mauna Kea, connecting it to Mount Everest. Mauna Kea's peak stands 30,610 ft (9,330 m) above this key col.

Mauna Kea is unusually topographically prominent for its height, with a wet prominence fifteenth in the world among mountains, and a dry prominence second in the world, after only Mount Everest. It is the highest peak on its island, so its wet prominence matches its height above sea level, at 13,803 ft (4,207.3 m). Because the Hawaiian Islands slope deep into the ocean, Mauna Kea has a dry prominence of 30,610 ft (9,330 m). This dry prominence is taller than Mount Everest's height above sea level of 29,031.7 feet (8,848.86 m), so Everest would have to include whole continents in its foothills to exceed Mauna Kea's dry prominence.

Given how much Mauna Kea protrudes from the Hawaiian Trough, some authorities have called it the tallest (as opposed to highest) mountain in the world, as measured from base to peak. Unlike prominence, base is loosely defined, which has resulted in numbers ranging from 32,696 ft (9,966 m) (roughly to the deepest point in the Hawaiian Trough) to 56,447 ft (17,205 m) (to the root of the mountain deep underground). Similar calculations have made contradictory claims for other mountains. The climb from the deepest known point on Earth's seabed (Challenger Deep) to nearby Mount Lamlam is 37,820 feet (11,530 m), and the Himalayan Mountains have tremendously deep roots. The climb between parts of the Atacama Trench and Andes Mountains has been described as "the highest slope on earth": the bottom of Richard's Deep (26,460 ft or 8,065 m deep) to the peak of the nearby Llullaillaco (22,110 ft or 6,739 m high) is 48,570 ft (14,804 m). Neither Mount Lamlam nor Llullaillaco have the dry prominence of Mauna Kea, because they do not extend into trenches in every direction.

== Geology ==
Clickable imagemap of Hawaiʻi island showing the location of Mauna Kea, making up 22.8 percent of the island's surface area

Mauna Kea is one of five volcanoes that form the island of Hawaiʻi, the largest and youngest island of the Hawaiian–Emperor seamount chain. Of these five hotspot volcanoes, Mauna Kea is the fourth oldest and fourth most active. It began as a preshield volcano driven by the Hawaiʻi hotspot around one million years ago, and became exceptionally active during its shield stage until 500,000 years ago. Mauna Kea entered its quieter post-shield stage 250,000 to 200,000 years ago, and is currently active, having last erupted between 4,500 and 6,000 years ago. Mauna Kea does not have a visible summit caldera, but contains a number of small cinder and pumice cones near its summit. A former summit caldera may have been filled and buried by later summit eruption deposits.

Mauna Kea is over 7,700 cubic miles (32,000 km^{3}) in volume, so massive that it and its neighbor, Mauna Loa, depress the ocean crust beneath it by 3.7 mi (6 km).

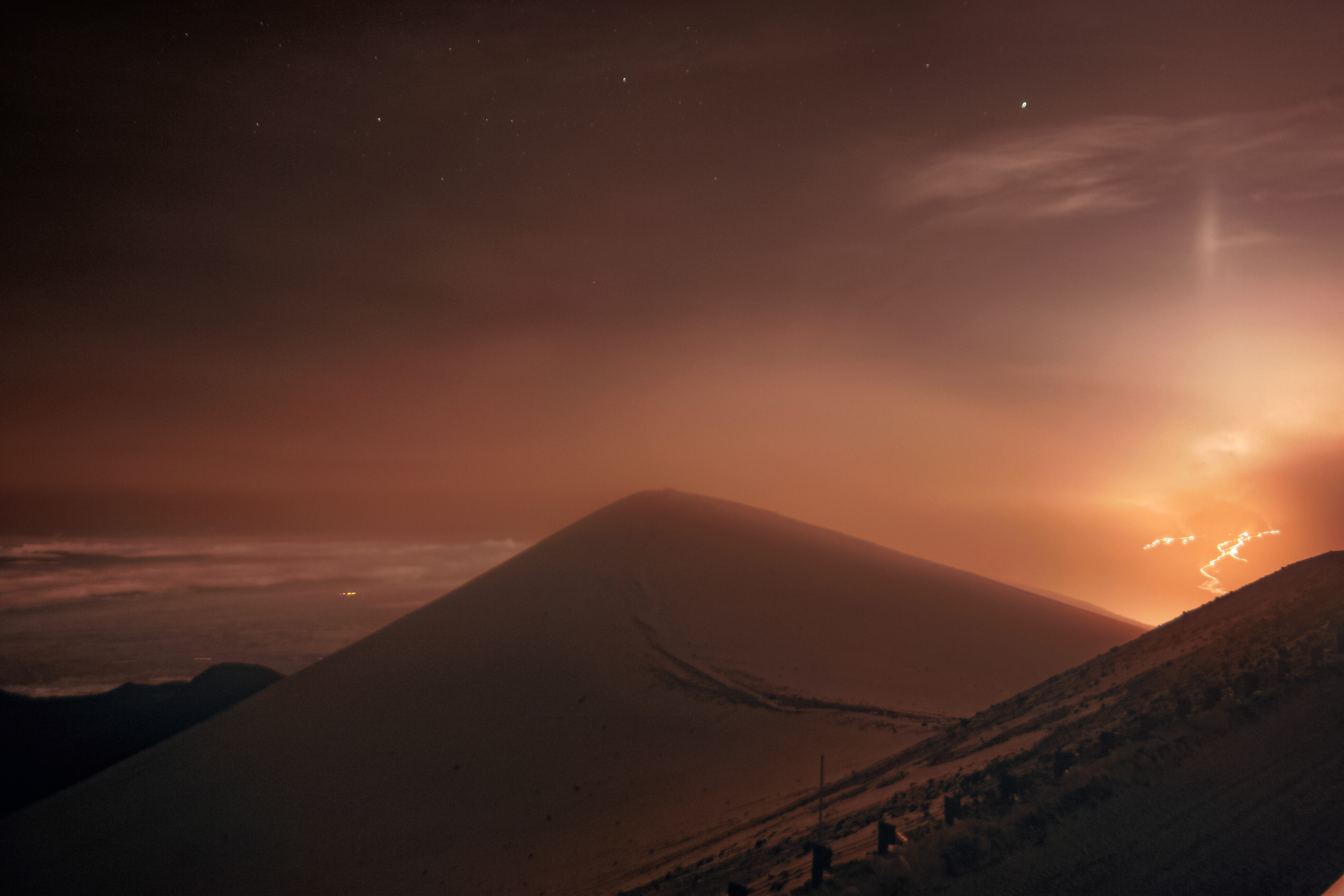
Lava flows from Mauna Loa caught by one of the International Gemini Observatory's Cloudcams, which operates 24/7 near the snow-covered summit of Maunakea (the highest point in the image).(on 27 November 2022).

The volcano continues to slip and flatten under its own weight at a rate of less than 0.01 in (0.2 mm) per year. Much of its mass lies east of its present summit. It stands 13,803 ft (4,207.3 m) above sea level, about 125 ft (38 m) higher than its neighbor Mauna Loa, and is the highest point in the state of Hawaii.

Like all Hawaiian volcanoes, Mauna Kea has been created as the Pacific tectonic plate has moved over the Hawaiian hotspot in the Earth's underlying mantle. The Hawaii island volcanoes are the most recent evidence of this process that, over 70 million years, has created the 3,700-mile-long (6,000 km) Hawaiian Ridge–Emperor seamount chain. The prevailing, though not completely settled, view is that the hotspot has been largely stationary within the planet's mantle for much, if not all of the Cenozoic Era. However, while Hawaiian volcanism is well understood and extensively studied, there remains no definite explanation of the mechanism that causes the hotspot effect.

Lava flows from Mauna Kea overlapped in complex layers with those of its neighbors during its growth. Most prominently, Mauna Kea is built upon older flows from Kohala to the northwest, and intersects the base of Mauna Loa to the south. The original eruptive fissures (rift zones) in the flanks of Mauna Kea were buried by its post-shield volcanism. Hilo Ridge, a prominent underwater rift zone structure east of Mauna Kea, was once believed to be a part of the volcano; however, it is now understood to be a rift zone of Kohala that has been affected by younger Mauna Kea flows.

The shield-stage lavas that built the enormous main mass of the volcano are tholeiitic basalts, like those of Mauna Loa, created through the mixing of primary magma and subducted oceanic crust. They are covered by the oldest exposed rock strata on Mauna Kea, the post-shield alkali basalts of the Hāmākua Volcanics, which erupted between 250,000 and 70–65,000 years ago. The most recent volcanic flows are hawaiites and mugearites: they are the post-shield Laupāhoehoe Volcanics, erupted between 65,000 and 4,000 years ago. These changes in lava composition accompanied the slow reduction of the supply of magma to the summit, which led to weaker eruptions that then gave way to isolated episodes associated with volcanic dormancy. The Laupāhoehoe lavas are more viscous and contain more volatiles than the earlier tholeiitic basalts; their thicker flows significantly steepened Mauna Kea's flanks. In addition, explosive eruptions have built cinder cones near the summit. These cones are the most recent eruptive centers of Mauna Kea. Its present summit is dominated by lava domes and cinder cones up to 0.93 miles (1.5 km) in diameter and hundreds of meters tall.

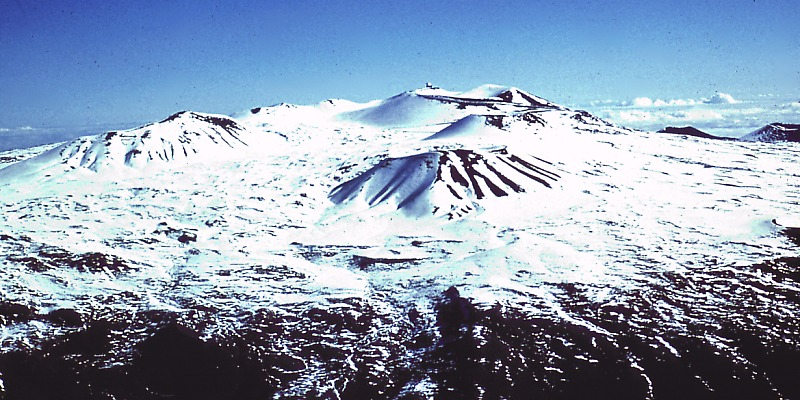
Scoria and cinder cones on Mauna Kea's summit in winter

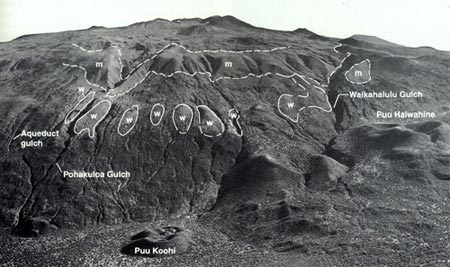
Glacial evidence on Mauna Kea, outlining terminal moraines ("m") and till ("w")

Mauna Kea is the only Hawaiian volcano with distinct evidence of glaciation. Similar deposits probably existed on Mauna Loa, but have been covered by later lava flows. Despite Hawaii's tropical location, during several past ice ages a drop of a degree in temperature allowed snow to remain at the volcano's summit through summer, triggering the formation of an ice cap. There are three episodes of glaciation that have been recorded from the last 180,000 years: the Pōhakuloa (180–130 ka), Wāihu (80–60 ka) and Mākanaka (40–13 ka) series. These have extensively sculpted the summit, depositing moraines and a circular ring of till and gravel along the volcano's upper flanks. Subglacial eruptions built cinder cones during the Mākanaka glaciation, most of which were heavily gouged by glacial action. The most recent cones were built between 9,000 and 4,500 years ago, atop the glacial deposits, although one study indicates that the last eruption may have been around 3,600 years ago.

At their maximum extent, the glaciers extended from the summit down to between 10,500 and 12,500 feet (3,200 and 3,800 m) of elevation. A small body of permafrost, less than 82 feet (25 m) across, was found at the summit of Mauna Kea before 1974, and may still be present. Small gullies etch the summit, formed by rain- and snow-fed streams that flow only during winter melt and rain showers. On the windward side of the volcano, stream erosion driven by trade winds has accelerated erosion in a manner similar to that on older Kohala.

Mauna Kea is home to Lake Waiau, the highest lake in the Pacific Basin. At an altitude of 13,022 ft (3,969 m), it lies within the Puʻu Waiau cinder cone and is the only alpine lake in Hawaii. The lake is very small and shallow, with a surface area of 1.8 acres (0.73 ha) and a depth of 9.8 ft (3 m) when fullest. Radiocarbon dating of samples at the base of the lake indicates that it was clear of ice 12,600 years ago. Hawaiian lava types are typically permeable, preventing lake formation due to infiltration. Either sulfur-bearing steam altered the volcanic ash to low-permeability clays, or explosive interactions between rising magma and groundwater or surface water during phreatic eruptions formed exceptionally fine ash that reduced the permeability of the lake bed.

No artesian water was known on the island of Hawaiʻi until 1993 when drilling by the University of Hawaiʻi tapped an artesian aquifer more than 980 ft (300 m) below sea level, that extended more than 330 ft (100 m) of the borehole's total depth. The borehole had drilled through a compacted layer of soil and lava where the flows of Mauna Loa had encroached upon the exposed Mauna Kea surface and had subsequently been subsided below sea level. Isotopic composition shows the water present to have been derived from rain coming off Mauna Kea at higher than 6,600 ft (2,000 m) above mean sea level. The aquifer's presence is attributed to a freshwater head within Mauna Kea's basal lens. Scientists believe there may be more water in Mauna Kea's freshwater lens than current models may indicate. Two more boreholes were drilled on Mauna Kea in 2012, with water being found at much higher elevations and shallower depths than expected. Donald Thomas, director of the University of Hawaiʻi's Center for the Study of Active Volcanoes believes one reason to continue study of the aquifers is due to use and occupancy of the higher elevation areas, stating: "Nearly all of these activities depend on the availability of potable water that, in most cases, must be trucked to the Saddle from Waimea or Hilo — an inefficient and expensive process that consumes a substantial quantity of our scarce liquid fuels."

=== Future activity ===
The last eruption of Mauna Kea was about 4,600 years ago (about 2600 BC); because of this inactivity, Mauna Kea is assigned a United States Geological Survey hazard listing of 7 for its summit and 8 for its lower flanks, out of the lowest possible hazard rating of 9 (which is given to the extinct volcano Kohala). Since 8000 BC lava flows have covered 20% of the volcano's summit and virtually none of its flanks.

Despite its dormancy, Mauna Kea is expected to erupt again. Based on earlier eruptions, such an event could occur anywhere on the volcano's upper flanks and would likely produce long lava flows, mostly of ʻaʻā, 9.3–15.5 miles (15–25 km) long. Long periods of activity could build a cinder cone at the source. Although not likely in the next few centuries, such an eruption would probably result in little loss of life but significant damage to infrastructure.

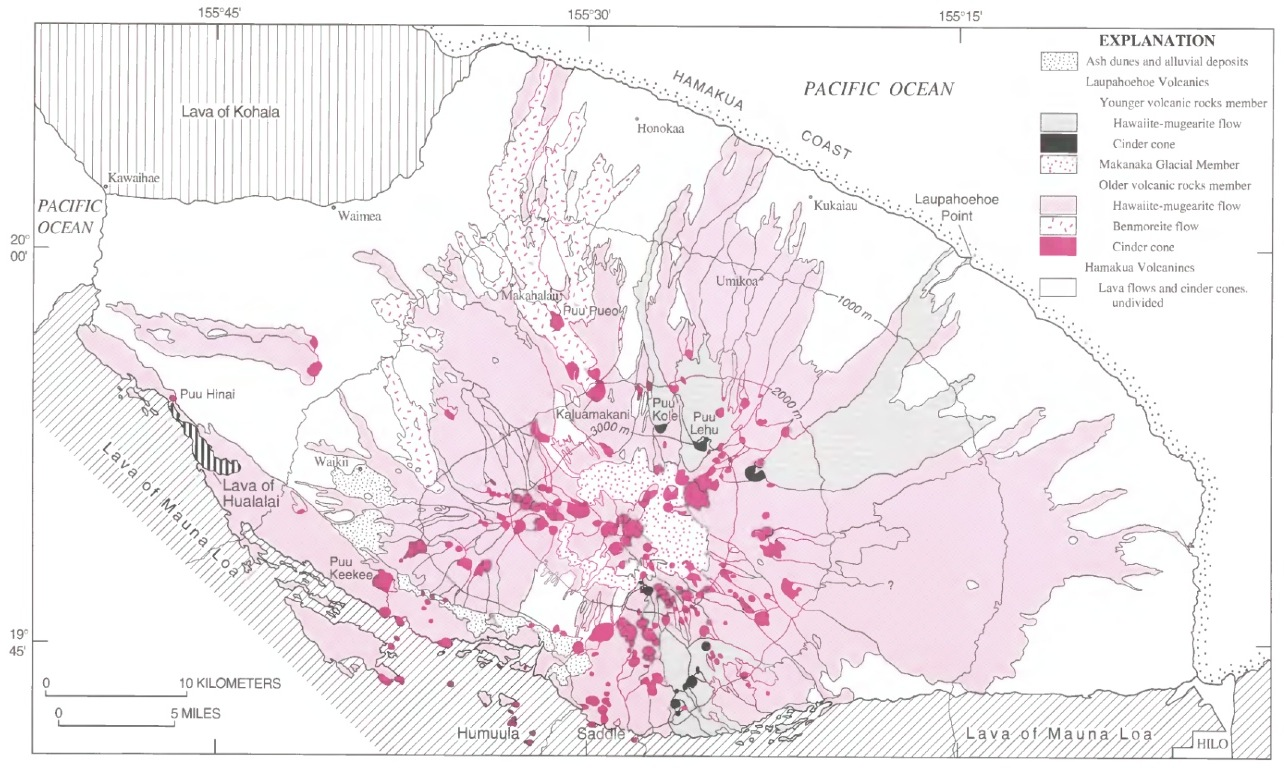
Geologically recent Mauna Kea cinder cones and lava flows

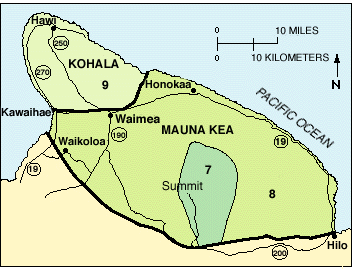
Hazard mapping of Mauna Kea and nearby Kohala

== Human history ==
=== Native history ===
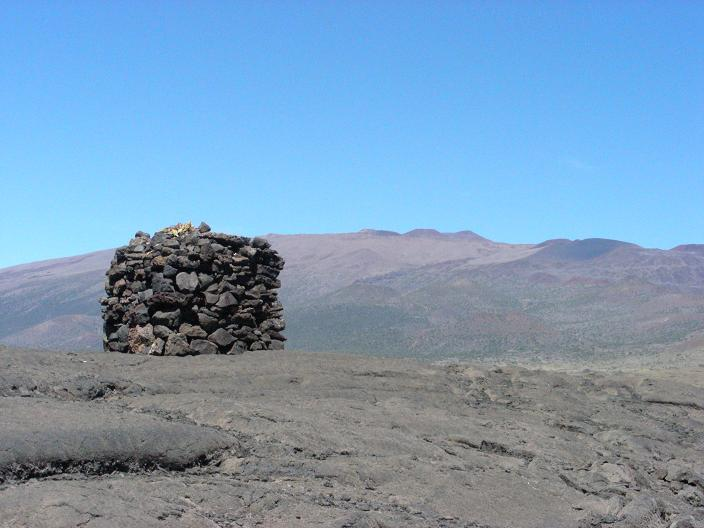
A stone structure or Ahu facing Mauna Kea, on Saddle Road between Mauna Kea and Mauna Loa

The first Ancient Hawaiians to arrive on Hawaiʻi island lived along the shores, where food and water were plentiful. Settlement expanded inland to the Mauna Loa – Mauna Kea region in the 12th and early 13th centuries. Archaeological evidence suggests that these regions were used for hunting, collecting stone material, and possibly for spiritual reasons or for astronomical or navigational observations. The mountain's plentiful forest provided plants and animals for food and raw materials for shelter. Flightless birds that had previously known no predators became a staple food source.

Early settlement of the Hawaiian islands led to major changes to local ecosystems and many extinctions, particularly amongst bird species. Ancient Hawaiians brought foreign plants and animals, and their arrival was associated with increased rates of erosion. The prevailing lowland forest ecosystem was transformed from forest to grassland; some of this change was caused by the use of fire, but the prevailing cause of forest ecosystem collapse and avian extinction on Hawaiʻi appears to have been the introduction of the Polynesian (or Pacific) rat.

The five volcanoes of Hawaiʻi are revered as sacred mountains. For this reason, a kapu (ancient Hawaiian law) restricted visitor rights to high-ranking aliʻi. Hawaiians associated elements of their natural environment with particular deities. In Hawaiian mythology, the summit of Mauna Kea was seen as the "region of the gods", a place where benevolent spirits reside. Poliʻahu, deity of snow, also resides there. "Mauna Kea" is an abbreviation for Mauna a Wākea and means 'white mountain' in reference to its seasonally snow-capped summit; Wākea is also the Hawaiian sky god.

Around AD 1100, natives established adze quarries high up on Mauna Kea to extract the uniquely dense basalt (generated by the quick cooling of lava flows meeting glacial ice during subglacial eruptions) to make tools. Volcanic glass and gabbro were collected for blades and fishing gear, and māmane wood was preferred for the handles. At peak quarry activity after AD 1400, there were separate facilities for rough and fine cutting; shelters with food, water, and wood to sustain the workers; and workshops creating the finished product.

Lake Waiau provided drinking water for the workers. Native chiefs would also dip the umbilical cords of newborn babies in its water, to give them the strength of the mountain. Use of the quarry declined between this period and contact with Americans and Europeans. As part of the ritual associated with quarrying, the workers erected shrines to their gods; these and other quarry artifacts remain at the sites, most of which lie within what is now the Mauna Kea Ice Age Reserve.

This early era was followed by cultural expansion between the 12th and late 18th century. Land was divided into regions designed for the immediate needs of the populace. These ahupuaʻa generally took the form of long strips of land oriented from the mountain summits to the coast. Mauna Kea's summit was encompassed in the ahupuaʻa of Kaʻohe, with part of its eastern slope reaching into the nearby Humuʻula. Principal sources of nutrition for Hawaiians living on the slopes of the volcano came from the māmane–naio forest of its upper slopes, which provided them with vegetation and bird life. Bird species hunted included the ʻuaʻu (Pterodroma sandwichensis), nēnē (Branta sandvicensis), and palila (Loxioides bailleui). The lower koa–ʻōhiʻa forest gave the natives wood for canoes and ornate bird feathers for decoration.

=== Modern era ===
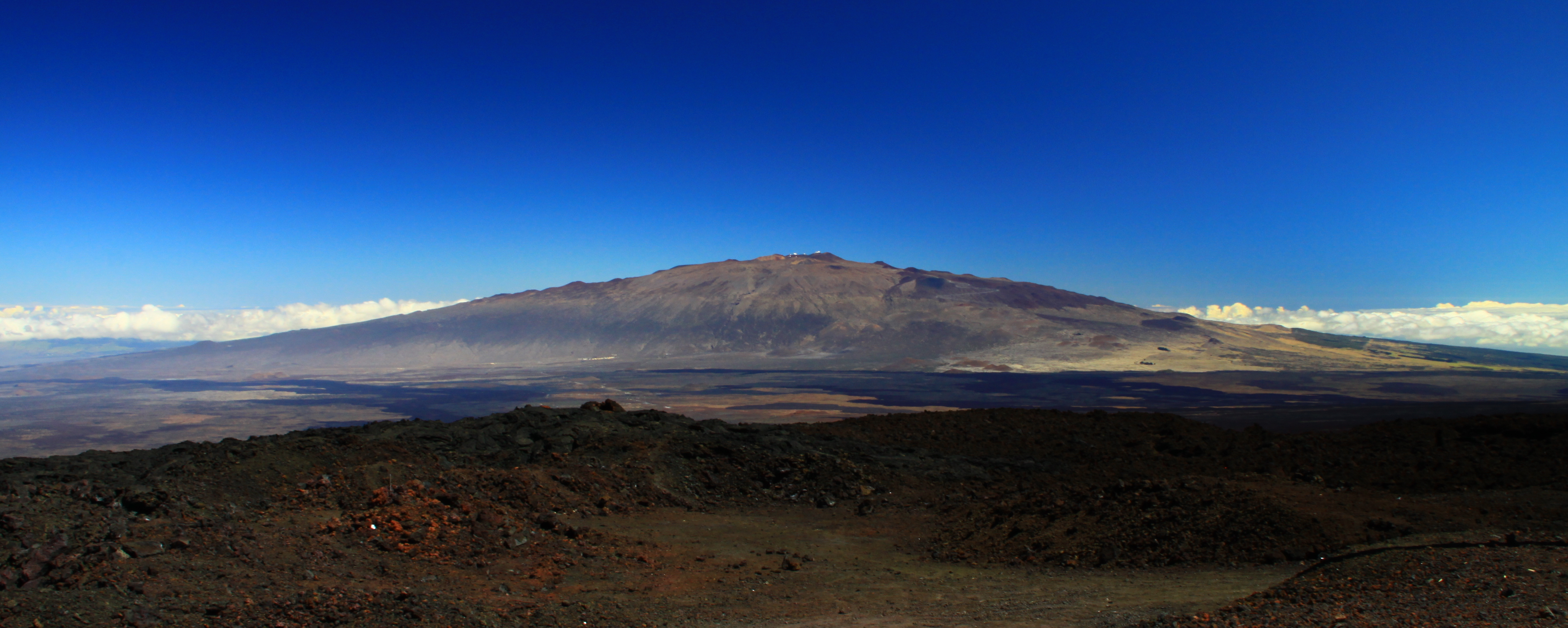
View of the mountain from Mauna Loa Observatory

There are three accounts of foreigners visiting Hawaiʻi before the arrival of James Cook, in 1778. However, the earliest Western depictions of the isle, including Mauna Kea, were created by explorers in the late 18th and early 19th centuries. Contact with Europe and America had major consequences for island residents. Native Hawaiians were devastated by introduced diseases; port cities including Hilo, Kealakekua, and Kailua grew with the establishment of trade; and the adze quarries on Mauna Kea were abandoned after the introduction of metal tools.

In 1793, cattle were brought by George Vancouver as a tribute to King Kamehameha I. By the early 19th century, they had escaped confinement and roamed the island freely, greatly damaging its ecosystem. In 1809 John Palmer Parker arrived and befriended Kamehameha I, who put him in charge of cattle management on the island. With an additional land grant in 1845, Parker established Parker Ranch on the northern slope of Mauna Kea, a large cattle ranch that is still in operation today. Settlers to the island burned and cut down much of the lower native forest for sugarcane plantations and houses.

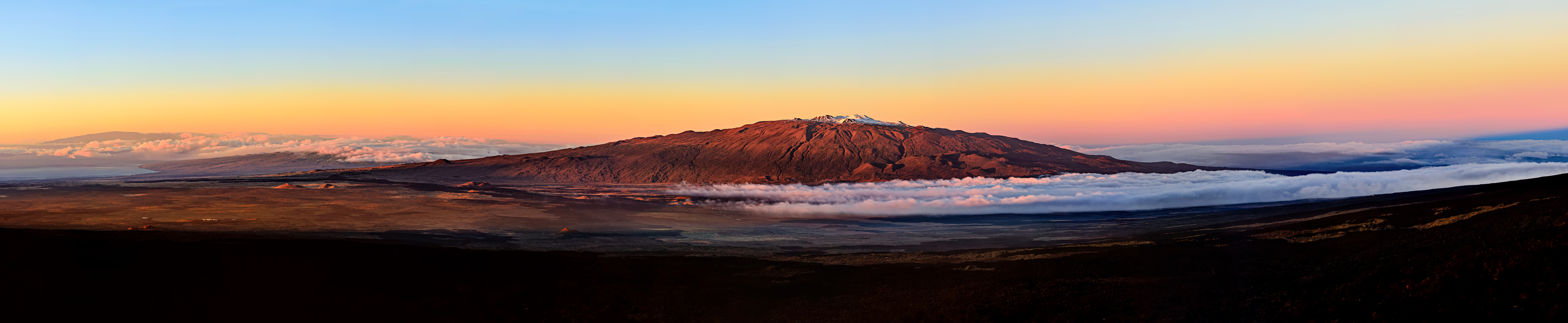
Mauna Kea, one of the volcanoes constituting the island of Hawai‘i, is an inactive shield volcano and one of the tallest mountains on Earth at an elevation of 13,786 feet.

The Saddle Road, named for its crossing of the saddle-shaped plateau between Mauna Kea and Mauna Loa, was completed in 1943, and eased travel to Mauna Kea considerably.

The Pohakuloa Training Area on the plateau is the largest military training ground in Hawaiʻi. The 108,863-acre (44,055 ha) base extends from the volcano's lower flanks to 6,790 ft (2,070 m) in elevation, on state land leased to the US Army since 1956. There are 15 threatened and endangered plants, three endangered birds, and one endangered bat species in the area.

Mauna Kea has been the site of extensive archaeological research since the 1980s. Approximately 27 percent of the Science Reserve had been surveyed by 2000, identifying 76 shrines, 4 adze manufacturing workshops, 3 other markers, 1 positively identified burial site, and 4 possible burial sites. By 2009, the total number of identified sites had risen to 223, and archaeological research on the volcano's upper flanks is ongoing. It has been suggested that the shrines, which are arranged around the volcano's summit along what may be an ancient snow line, are markers for the transition to the sacred part of Mauna Kea. Despite many references to burial around Mauna Kea in Hawaiian oral history, few sites have been confirmed. The lack of shrines or other artifacts on the many cinder cones dotting the volcano may be because they were reserved for burial.

=== Ascents ===
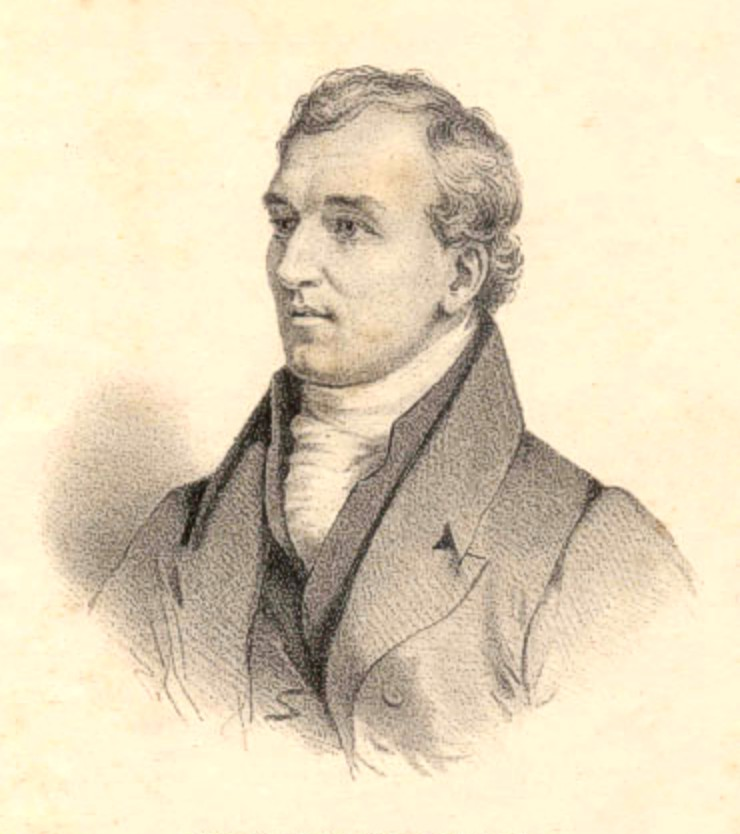
David Douglas, a Scottish botanist who died on Mauna Kea in 1834

In pre-contact times, natives traveling up Mauna Kea were probably guided more by landscape than by existing trails, as no evidence of trails has been found. It is possible that natural ridges and water sources were followed instead. Individuals likely took trips up Mauna Kea's slopes to visit family-maintained shrines near its summit, and traditions related to ascending the mountain exist to this day. However, very few natives reached the summit, because of the strict kapu placed on it.

In the early 19th century, the earliest notable recorded ascents of Mauna Kea included the following:

- On 26 August 1823, Joseph F. Goodrich, an American missionary, made the first recorded ascent in a single day; however, a small arrangement of stones he observed suggested he was not the first human on the summit. He recorded four ecosystems as he travelled from base to summit, and also visited Lake Waiau.
- On 17 June 1825, an expedition from HMS Blonde, led by botanist James Macrae, reached the summit of Mauna Kea. Macrae was the first person to record the Mauna Kea silversword (Argyroxiphium sandwicense), saying: "The last mile was destitute of vegetation except one plant of the Sygenisia tribe, in growth much like a Yucca, with sharp pointed silver coloured leaves and green upright spike of three or four feet producing pendulous branches with brown flowers, truly superb, and almost worth the journey of coming here to see it on purpose."
- In January 1834, David Douglas climbed the mountain and described extensively the division of plant species by altitude. On an unrelated traverse, from Kamuela to Hilo in July, he was found dead in a pit intended to catch wild cattle. Although murder was suspected, it was probably an accidental fall. The site, Ka lua kauka 19°53′17″N 155°20′17″W, is marked by the Douglas fir trees named for him.
- In 1881, Queen Emma traveled to the peak to bathe in the waters of Lake Waiau during competition for the role of ruling chief of the Kingdom of Hawaiʻi.
- On 6 August 1889, E.D. Baldwin left Hilo and followed cattle trails to the summit.
- In February 2021, Victor Vescovo and Clifford Kapono made the first ascent of Mauna Kea from its subaerial base 16,785 ft below sea level using the submersible Limiting Factor, then ocean kayaks from above the mountain base 27 miles to the shoreline, then bicycles to a camp at about 9000 ft altitude from which they then walked to the 13,802 ft summit (a total gain of 30,587 ft).

In the late 19th and early 20th centuries trails were formed, often by the movement of game herds, that could be traveled on horseback. However, vehicular access to the summit was practically impossible until the construction of a road in 1964, and it continues to be restricted. Today, multiple trails to the summit exist, in various states of use.

== Ecology ==
=== Background ===
Hawaiʻi's geographical isolation strongly influences its ecology. Remote islands like Hawaiʻi have a large number of species that are found nowhere else (see Endemism in the Hawaiian Islands). The remoteness resulted in evolutionary lines distinct from those elsewhere and isolated these endemic species from external biotic influence, and also makes them especially vulnerable to extinction and the effects of invasive species. In addition the ecosystems of Hawaiʻi are under threat from human development including the clearing of land for agriculture; an estimated third of the island's endemic species have already been wiped out. Because of its elevation, Mauna Kea has the greatest diversity of biotic ecosystems anywhere in the Hawaiian archipelago. Ecosystems on the mountain form concentric rings along its slopes due to changes in temperature and precipitation with elevation. These ecosystems can be roughly divided into three sections by elevation: alpine–subalpine, montane, and basal forest.

Contact with Americans and Europeans in the early 19th century brought more settlers to the island, and had a lasting negative ecological effect. On lower slopes, vast tracts of koa–ʻōhiʻa forest were converted to farmland. Higher up, feral animals that escaped from ranches found refuge in, and damaged extensively, Mauna Kea's native māmane–naio forest. Non-native plants are the other serious threat; there are over 4,600 introduced species on the island, whereas the number of native species is estimated at just 1,000.

=== Alpine environment ===
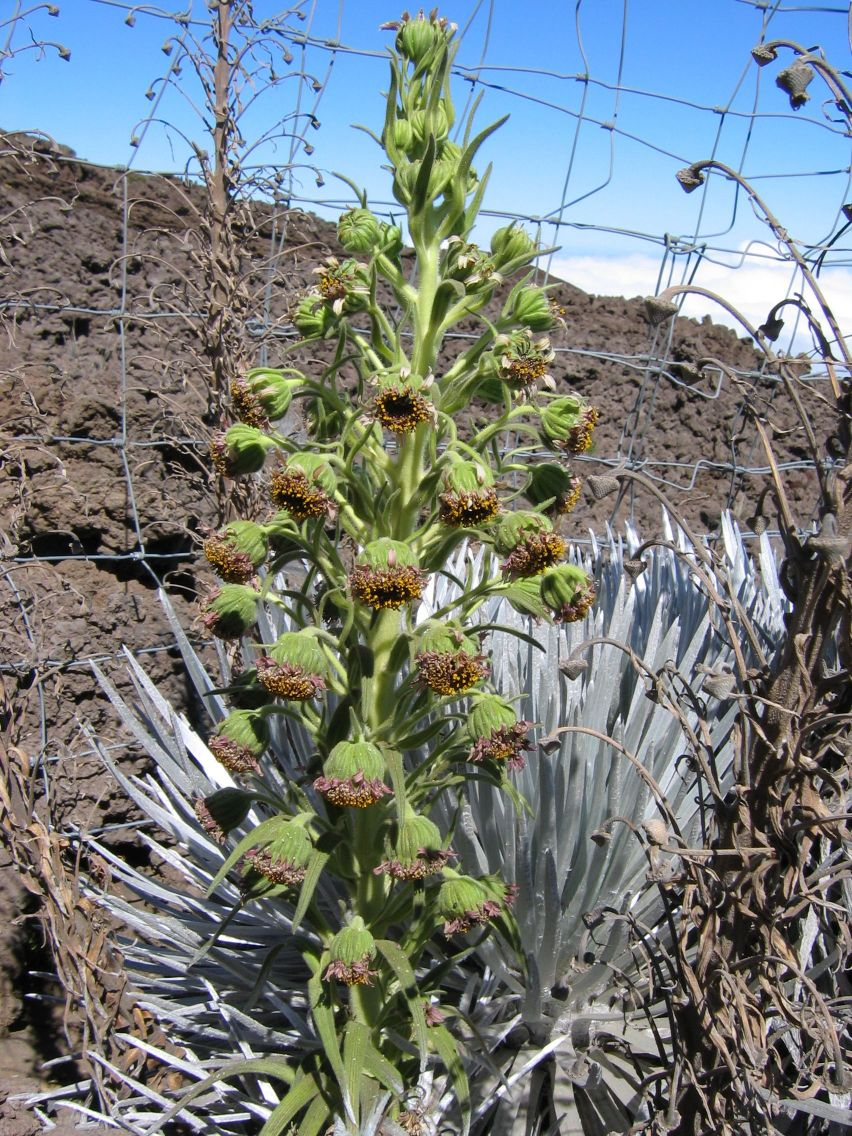
Mauna Kea silversword (Argyroxiphium sandwicense sandwicense) growing near the volcano's summit

The summit of Mauna Kea lies above the tree line, and consists of mostly lava rock and alpine tundra. An area of heavy snowfall, it is inhospitable to vegetation, and is known as the Hawaiian tropical high shrublands. Growth is restricted here by extremely cold temperatures, a short growing season, low rainfall, and snow during winter months. A lack of soil also retards root growth, makes it difficult to absorb nutrients from the ground, and gives the area a very low water retention capacity.

Plant species found at this elevation include Styphelia tameiameiae, Taraxacum officinale, Tetramolopium humile, Agrostis sandwicensis, Anthoxanthum odoratum, Trisetum glomeratum, Poa annua, Sonchus oleraceus, and Coprosma ernodiodes. One notable species is Mauna Kea silversword (Argyroxiphium sandwicense var. sandwicense), a highly endangered endemic plant species that thrives in Mauna Kea's high elevation cinder deserts. At one stage reduced to a population of just 50 plants, Mauna Kea silversword was thought to be restricted to the alpine zone, but in fact has been driven there by pressure from livestock, and can grow at lower elevations as well.

The Mauna Kea Ice Age Reserve on the southern summit flank of Mauna Kea was established in 1981. The reserve is a region of sparsely vegetated cinder deposits and lava rock, including areas of aeolian desert and Lake Waiau. This ecosystem is a likely haven for the threatened ʻuaʻu (Pterodroma sandwichensis) and also the center of a study on wēkiu bugs (Nysius wekiuicola).

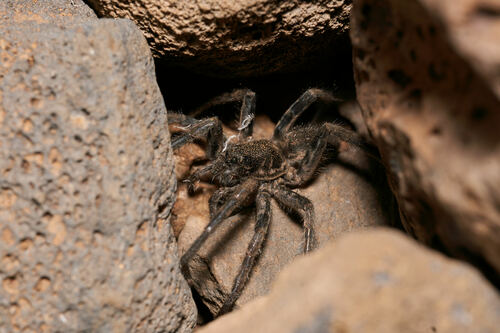
Undescribed Lycosa wolf spider endemic to the summit alpine desert on Mauna Kea

Wēkiu bugs feed on dead insect carcasses that drift up Mauna Kea on the wind and settle on snow banks. This is a highly unusual food source for a species in the genus Nysius, which consists of predominantly seed-eating insects. They can survive at extreme elevations of up to 13,800 ft (4,200 m) because of natural antifreeze in their blood. They also stay under heated surfaces most of the time. Their conservation status is unclear, but the species is no longer a candidate for the Endangered Species List; studies on the welfare of the species began in 1980. The closely related Nysius aa lives on Mauna Loa. Wolf spiders (Lycosidae) and forest tent caterpillar moths have also been observed in the same Mauna Kea ecosystem; the former survive by hiding under heat-absorbing rocks, and the latter through cold-resistant chemicals in their bodies. Several native moths are also present near the summit including Agrotis helela and Agrotis kuamauna.

=== Māmane–naio forest ===
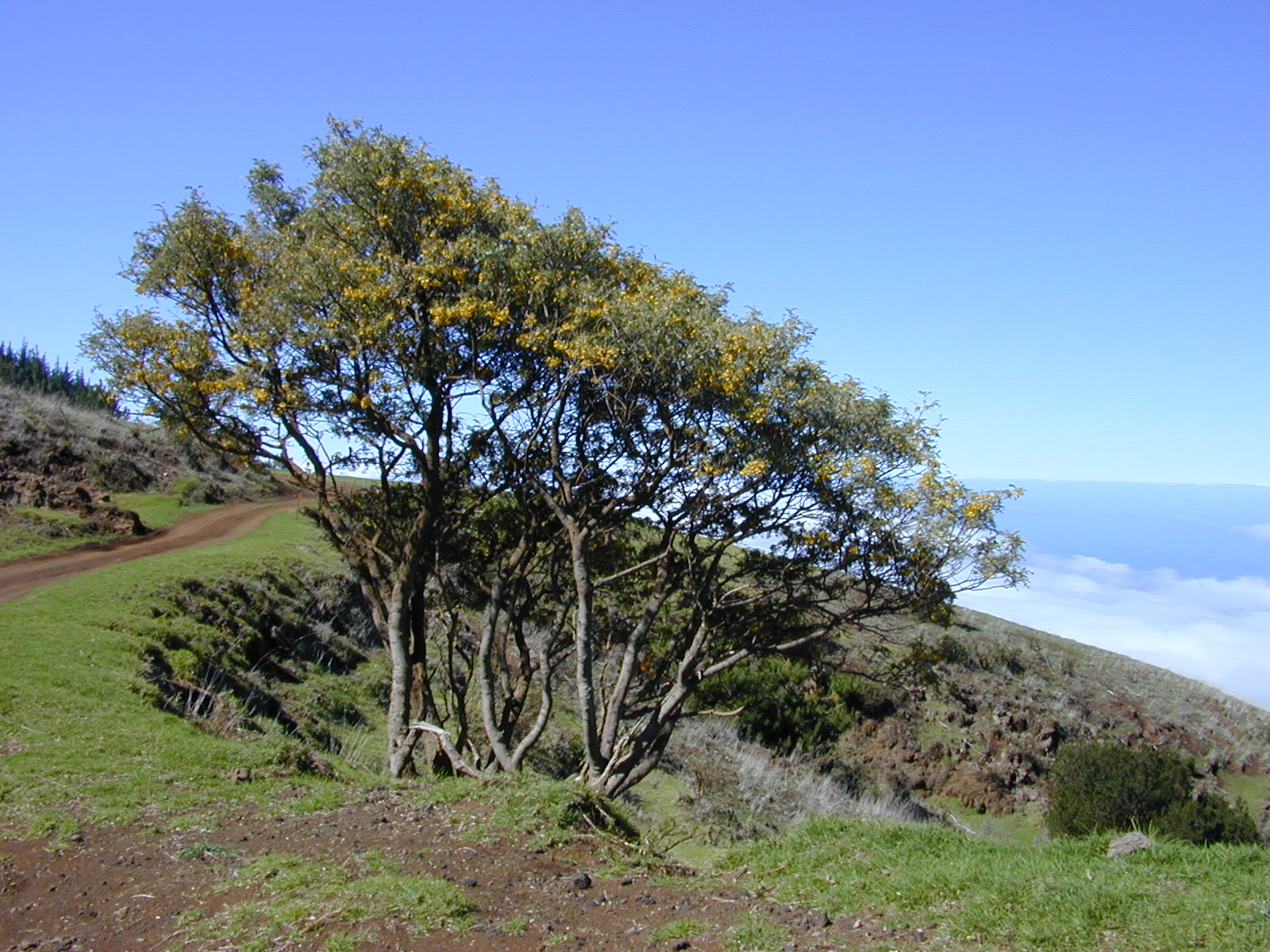
A pair of māmane (Sophora chrysophylla) trees

The forested zone on the volcano, at an elevation of 6,600–9,800 ft (2,000–3,000 m), is dominated by māmane (Sophora chrysophylla) and naio (Myoporum sandwicense), both endemic tree species, and is thus known as māmane–naio forest. Māmane seeds and naio fruit are the chief foods of the birds in this zone, especially the palila (Loxioides bailleui). The palila was formerly found on the slopes of Mauna Kea, Mauna Loa, and Hualālai, but is now confined to the slopes of Mauna Kea—only 10% of its former range—and has been declared critically endangered.

The largest threat to the ecosystem is grazing by feral sheep, cattle (Bos primigenius), and goats (Capra hircus) introduced to the island in the late 18th century. Feral animal competition with commercial grazing was severe enough that a program to eradicate them existed as far back as the late 1920s, and continued through to 1949. One of the results of this grazing was the increased prevalence of herbaceous and woody plants, both endemic and introduced, that were resistant to browsing. The feral animals were almost eradicated, and numbered a few hundred in the 1950s. However, an influx of local hunters led to the feral species being valued as game animals, and in 1959 the Hawaiʻi Department of Land and Natural Resources, the governing body in charge of conservation and land use management, changed its policy to a sustained-control program designed to facilitate the sport.

Mouflon (Ovis aries orientalis) was introduced from 1962 to 1964, and a plan to release axis deer (Axis axis) in 1964 was prevented only by protests from the ranching industry, who said that they would damage crops and spread disease. The hunting industry fought back, and the back-and-forth between the ranchers and hunters eventually gave way to a rise in public environmental concern. With the development of astronomical facilities on Mauna Kea commencing, conservationists demanded protection of Mauna Kea's ecosystem. A plan was proposed to fence 25% of the forests for protection, and manage the remaining 75% for game hunting. Despite opposition from conservationists the plan was put into action. While the land was partitioned no money was allocated for the building of the fence. In the midst of this wrangling the Endangered Species Act was passed; the National Audubon Society and Sierra Club Legal Defense Fund filed a lawsuit against the Hawaiʻi Department of Land and Natural Resources, claiming that they were violating federal law, in the landmark case Palila v. Hawaii Department of Land and Natural Resources (1978).

The court ruled in favor of conservationists and upheld the precedence of federal laws before state control of wildlife. Having violated the Endangered Species Act, Hawaiʻi state was required to remove all feral animals from the mountainside. This decision was followed by a second court order in 1981. A public hunting program removed many of the feral animals, at least temporarily. An active control program is in place, though it is not conducted with sufficient rigor to allow significant recovery of the māmane-naio ecosystem. There are many other species and ecosystems on the island, and on Mauna Kea, that remain threatened by human development and invasive species.

The Mauna Kea Forest Reserve protects 52,500 acres (82.0 sq mi; 212 km^{2}) of māmane-naio forest under the jurisdiction of the Hawaii Department of Land and Natural Resources. Ungulate hunting is allowed year-round. A small part of the māmane–naio forest is encompassed by the Mauna Kea State Recreation Area.

=== Lower environment ===
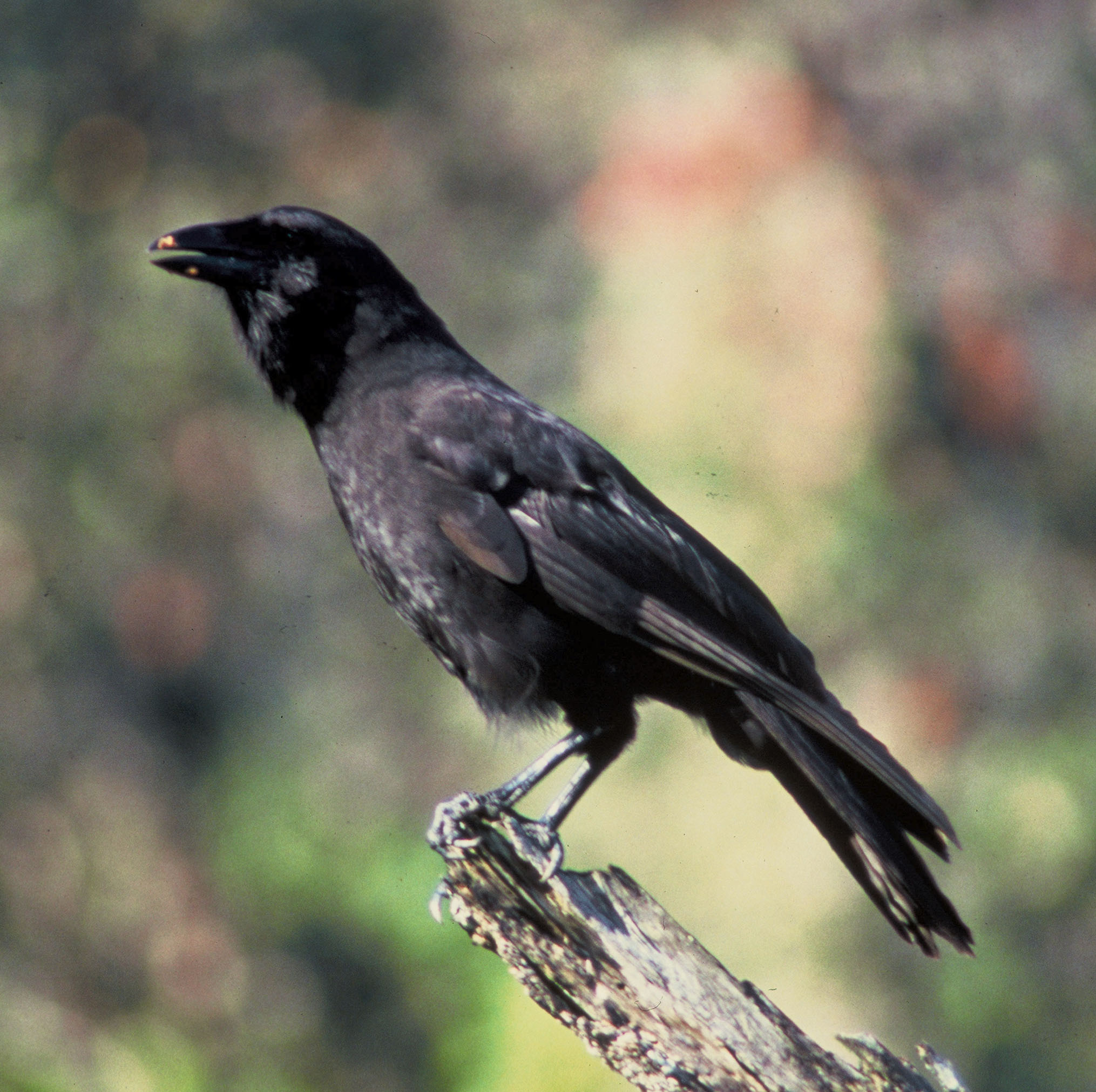
The ʻalalā or Hawaiian crow (Corvus hawaiiensis) is a bird in the crow family. It is extinct in the wild, with plans to reintroduce the species into the Hakalau Forest National Wildlife Refuge.

A band of ranch land on Mauna Kea's lower slopes was formerly Acacia koa – Metrosideros polymorpha (koa-ʻōhiʻa) forest. Its destruction was driven by an influx of European and American settlers in the early 19th century, as extensive logging during the 1830s provided lumber for new homes. Vast swathes of the forest were burned and cleared for sugarcane plantations. Most of the houses on the island were built of koa, and those parts of the forest that survived became a source for firewood to power boilers on the sugarcane plantations and to heat homes. The once vast forest had almost disappeared by 1880, and by 1900, logging interests had shifted to Kona and the island of Maui. With the collapse of the sugar industry in the 1990s, much of this land lies fallow but portions are used for cattle grazing, small-scale farming and the cultivation of eucalyptus for wood pulp.

The Hakalau Forest National Wildlife Refuge is a major koa forest reserve on Mauna Kea's windward slope. It was established in 1985, covering 32,733 acres (13,247 ha) of ecosystem remnant. Eight endangered bird species, twelve endangered plants, and the endangered Hawaiian hoary bat (Lasiurus cinereus semotus) have been observed in the area, in addition to many other rare biota. The reserve has been the site of an extensive replanting campaign since 1989. Parts of the reserve show the effect of agriculture on the native ecosystem, as much of the land in the upper part of the reserve is abandoned farmland.

Bird species native to the acacia koa–ʻōhiʻa forest include the Hawaiian crow (Corvus hawaiiensis), the ʻakepa (Loxops coccineus), Hawaii creeper (Oreomystis mana), ʻakiapōlāʻau (Hemignathus munroi), and Hawaiian hawk (Buteo solitarius), all of which are endangered, threatened, or near threatened; the Hawaiian crow in particular is extinct in the wild, but there are plans to reintroduce the species into the Hakalau reserve.

== Summit observatories ==
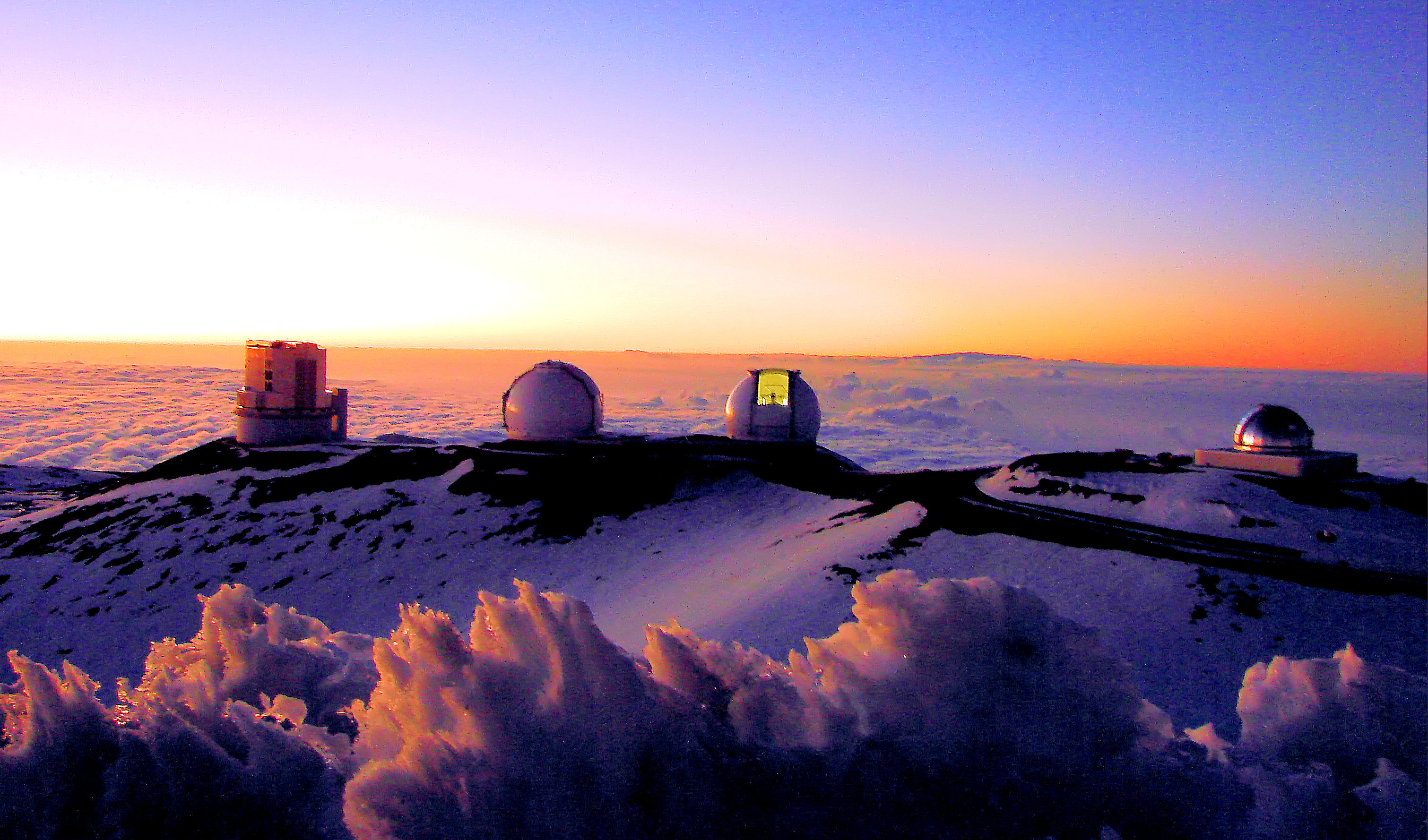
Sunset over four telescopes of the Maunakea Observatories. From left to right: the Subaru Telescope, the twin Keck I and II telescopes, and the NASA Infrared Telescope Facility.

Mauna Kea's summit is one of the best sites in the world for astronomical observation due to favorable observing conditions. The arid conditions are important for submillimeter and infrared astronomy for this region of the electromagnetic spectrum. The summit is above the inversion layer, keeping most cloud cover below the summit and ensuring the air on the summit is dry, and free of atmospheric pollution. The summit atmosphere is exceptionally stable, lacking turbulence for some of the world's best astronomical seeing. The very dark skies resulting from Mauna Kea's distance from city lights are preserved by legislation that minimizes light pollution from the surrounding area; the darkness level allows the observation of faint astronomical objects. These factors historically made Mauna Kea an excellent spot for stargazing.

In the early 1960s, the Hawaiʻi Island Chamber of Commerce encouraged astronomical development of Mauna Kea, as economic stimulus; this coincided with University of Arizona astronomer Gerard Kuiper's search for sites to use newly improved detectors of infrared light. Site testing by Kuiper's assistant Alika Herring in 1964 confirmed the summit's outstanding suitability. An intense three-way competition for NASA funds to construct a large telescope began between Kuiper, Harvard University, and the University of Hawaiʻi (UH), which only had experience in solar astronomy. This culminated in funds being awarded to the "upstart" UH proposal. UH rebuilt its small astronomy department into a new Institute for Astronomy, and in 1968 the Hawaiʻi Department of Land and Natural Resources gave it a 65-year lease for all land within a 2.5-mile (4 km) radius of its telescope, essentially that above 11,500 ft (3,505 m). On its completion in 1970, the UH 88 in (2.2 m) was the seventh largest optical/infrared telescope in the world.

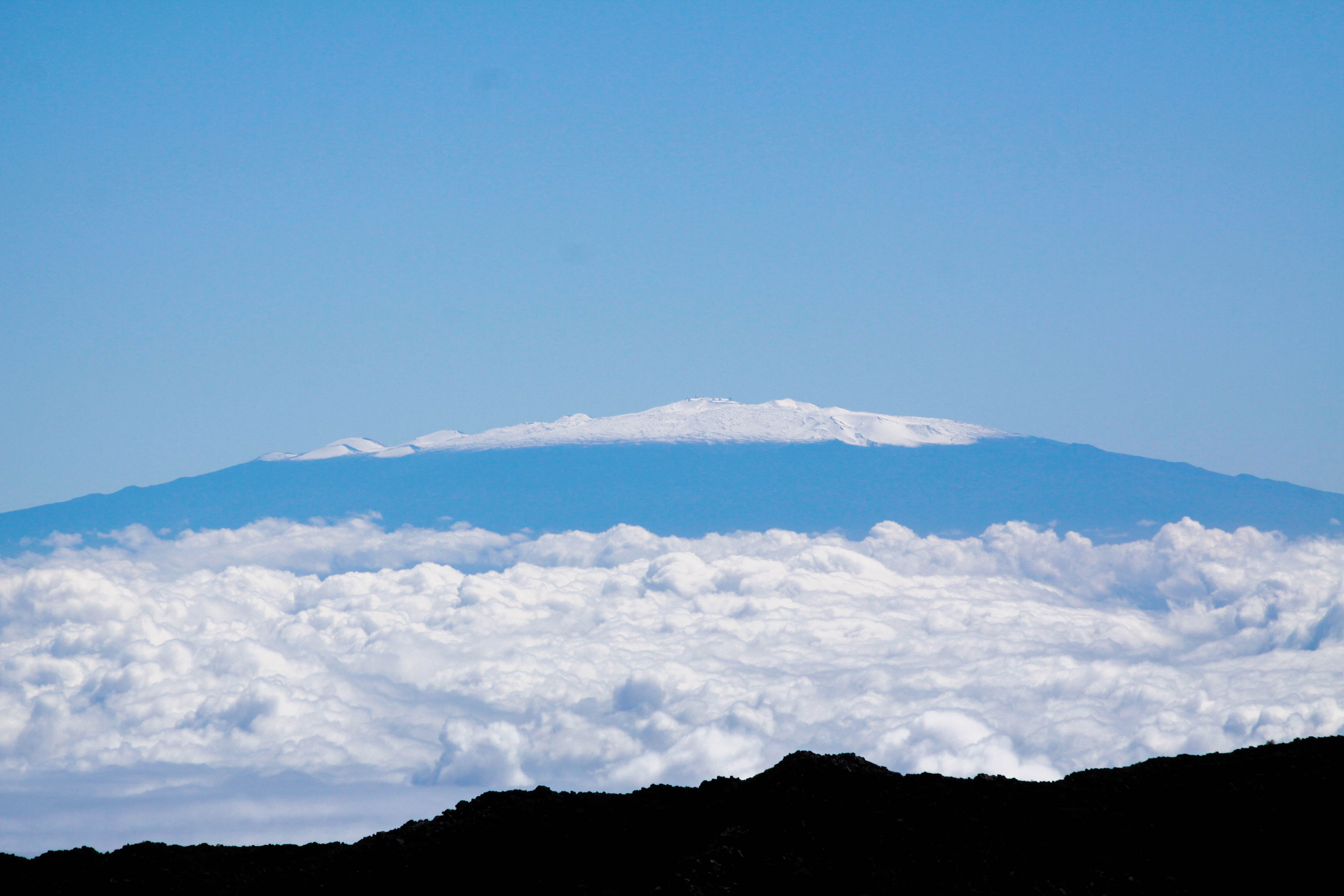
Mauna Kea from the summit of Haleakalā on Maui, approximately 78 mi (126 km) away

By 1970, two 24-inch (0.61 m) telescopes had been constructed by the US Air Force and Lowell Observatory. In 1973, Canada and France agreed to build the 3.6-meter Canada-France-Hawaii Telescope on Mauna Kea. However, local organizations started to raise concerns about the environmental impact of the observatory. This led the Department of Land and Natural Resources to prepare an initial management plan, drafted in 1977 and supplemented in 1980. In January 1982, the UH Board of Regents approved a plan to support the continued development of scientific facilities at the site. In 1998, 2,033 acres (823 ha) were transferred from the observatory lease to supplement the Mauna Kea Ice Age Reserve. The 1982 plan was replaced in 2000 by an extension designed to serve until 2020: it instituted an Office of Maunakea Management, designated 525 acres (212 ha) for astronomy, and shifted the remaining 10,763 acres (4,356 ha) to "natural and cultural preservation". This plan was further revised to address concern expressed in the Hawaiian community that a lack of respect was being shown toward the cultural values of the mountain.

Today the Mauna Kea Science Reserve has 13 observation facilities, each funded by as many as 11 countries. There are nine telescopes working in the visible and infrared spectrum, three in the submillimeter spectrum, and one in the radio spectrum, with mirrors or dishes ranging from 3.0 to 82.0 ft (0.9 to 25 m). In comparison, the Hubble Space Telescope has a 7.9-foot (2.4 m) mirror, similar in size to the UH88, now the second smallest telescope on the mountain.

A "Save Mauna Kea" movement believes development of the mountain to be sacrilegious. Native Hawaiian non-profit groups such as Kahea, concerned with cultural heritage and the environment, also oppose development for cultural and religious reasons. The multi-telescope "outrigger" proposed in 2006 was eventually canceled. A planned new telescope, the Thirty Meter Telescope (TMT), has attracted controversy including the Thirty Meter Telescope protests. The TMT was approved in April 2013. In October 2014, the groundbreaking ceremony for the telescope was interrupted by protesters causing the project to temporarily halt. In late March 2015, demonstrators blocked access of the road to the summit again. On 2 April 2015, 300 protestors were gathered near the visitor center when 12 people were arrested with 11 more arrested at the summit. Among the concerns of the protest groups are the land appraisals and Native Hawaiians consultation. Construction was halted on 7 April 2015, after protests expanded over the state. After several halts, the project has been voluntarily postponed. Governor Ige announced substantial changes to the management of Mauna Kea in the future but stated the project can move forward. The Supreme Court of Hawaiʻi approved the resumption of construction on 31 October 2018. Protestors have posted online petitions as a reaction against the Thirty Meter Telescope. The online petition titled "The Immediate Halt to the Construction of the TMT Telescope" was posted to Change.org on 14 July 2019. The online petition has currently gathered over 278,057 signatures worldwide. Some protesters have also called for the impeachment of Hawaiian Governor David Ige because of his support for the Thirty Meter Telescope. On 18 July 2019, an online petition titled "Impeach Governor David Ige" had been posted to Change.org and has currently gathered over 62,562 signatures.

As of late 2021, construction plans are currently on hold due to the ongoing effects of the COVID-19 pandemic and a shift in funding for the project that may see federal funds made available through the National Science Foundation. The controversy surrounding construction of the Thirty Meter Telescope continues. Independent polls commissioned by local media organizations show consistent support for the project in the islands with over two thirds of local residents supporting the project. These same polls indicate Native Hawaiian community support remains split with about half of Hawaiian respondents supporting construction of the new telescope.

A July 2022 state law responds to the protests by shifting control over the master land lease from the University of Hawaiʻi to the new Mauna Kea Stewardship and Oversight Authority (MKSOA). The MKSOA is a 12-member board (11 voting members and 1 non-voting member) which includes representatives from the university, astronomers and native Hawaiians and it was created with the aim of finding a balance between the conflicting interests of astronomers and native Hawaiians. It is placed within the Hawaii Department of Land and Natural Resources and will be the principal authority for the management of state-managed lands within the Mauna Kea lands after a 5-year transition period from the university starting on 1 July 2023. During the transition period, the MKSOA and the university will jointly manage the land while the authority develops a management plan to govern land uses, human activities, and overall operations. Once the transition period is up in 2028, the authority's responsibilities will include issuing new land use permits which will be important as the current master lease ends in 2033; any observatories which do not come up with new leases by the time of its expiration will be decommissioned.

== Climate ==
Mauna Kea has an alpine climate (ET). Due to the influence of its tropical latitude, temperature swings are very low. Frosts are common year round, but the average monthly temperature remains above freezing throughout the year.

Snow may fall at an altitude of 11,000 feet (3,353 m) and above in any month, but occurs most often from October to April.

A weather station was operated from 1972 to 1982; however, only 33 months within this period have temperature records. Many years only have data for two months. The temperatures presented below are smoothed averages, not the raw numbers recorded by NOAA.

Climate data for Mauna Kea Observatory, elevation: 13,800 ft (4,206 m)
| Month | Jan | Feb | Mar | Apr | May | Jun | Jul | Aug | Sep | Oct | Nov | Dec | Year |
|---|---|---|---|---|---|---|---|---|---|---|---|---|---|
| Record high °F (°C) | 55 (13) | 56 (13) | 54 (12) | 55 (13) | 59 (15) | 58 (14) | 75 (24) | 57 (14) | 60 (16) | 59 (15) | 54 (12) | 55 (13) | 75 (24) |
| Mean daily maximum °F (°C) | 42.0 (5.6) | 42.5 (5.8) | 40.3 (4.6) | 41.4 (5.2) | 47.5 (8.6) | 49.3 (9.6) | 50.9 (10.5) | 49.9 (9.9) | 50.5 (10.3) | 43.8 (6.6) | 45.1 (7.3) | 42.7 (5.9) | 45.5 (7.5) |
| Mean daily minimum °F (°C) | 26.3 (−3.2) | 26.1 (−3.3) | 24.9 (−3.9) | 26.2 (−3.2) | 29.0 (−1.7) | 29.4 (−1.4) | 30.3 (−0.9) | 30.9 (−0.6) | 31.3 (−0.4) | 29.5 (−1.4) | 27.8 (−2.3) | 27.6 (−2.4) | 28.3 (−2.1) |
| Record low °F (°C) | 19 (−7) | 12 (−11) | 18 (−8) | 18 (−8) | 12 (−11) | 23 (−5) | 22 (−6) | 17 (−8) | 23 (−5) | 20 (−7) | 20 (−7) | 17 (−8) | 12 (−11) |
| Average precipitation inches (mm) | 0.81 (21) | 0.24 (6.1) | 1.05 (27) | 0.50 (13) | 0.92 (23) | 0.14 (3.6) | 0.29 (7.4) | 0.77 (20) | 0.51 (13) | 0.58 (15) | 1.04 (26) | 0.52 (13) | 7.37 (188.1) |
Source: Western Regional Climate Center

== Recreation ==
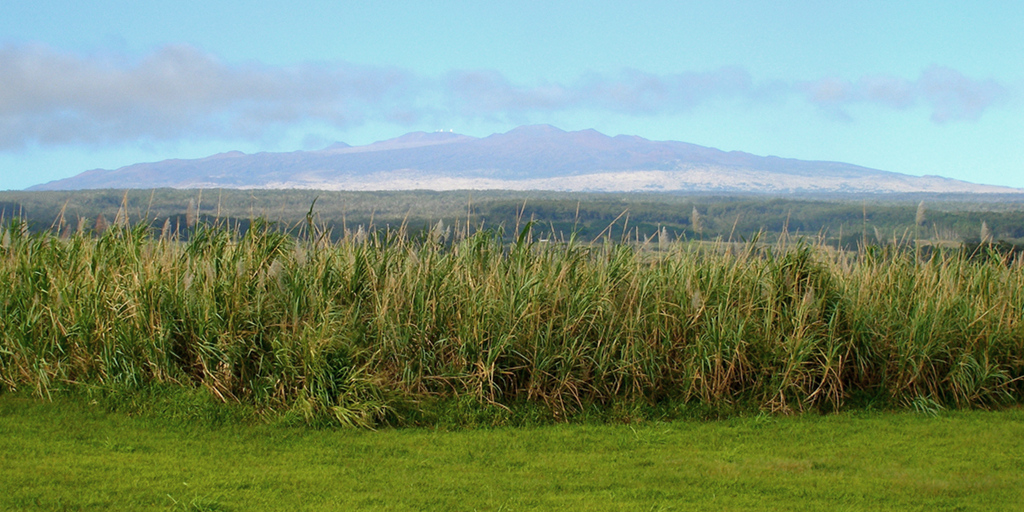
Mauna Kea from the Saddle Road near Hilo

Mauna Kea's coastline is dominated by the Hamakua Coast, an area of rugged terrain created by frequent slumps and landslides on the volcano's flank. The area includes several recreation parks including Kalopa State Recreation Area, Wailuku River State Park and Akaka Falls State Park.

There are over 3,000 registered hunters on Hawaii island, and hunting, for both recreation and sustenance, is a common activity on Mauna Kea. A public hunting program is used to control the numbers of introduced animals including pigs, sheep, goats, turkey, pheasants, and quail. The Mauna Kea State Recreation Area functions as a base camp for the sport. Birdwatching is also common at lower levels on the mountain. A popular site is Kīpuka Puʻu Huluhulu, a kīpuka on Mauna Kea's flank that formed when lava flows isolated the forest on a hill.

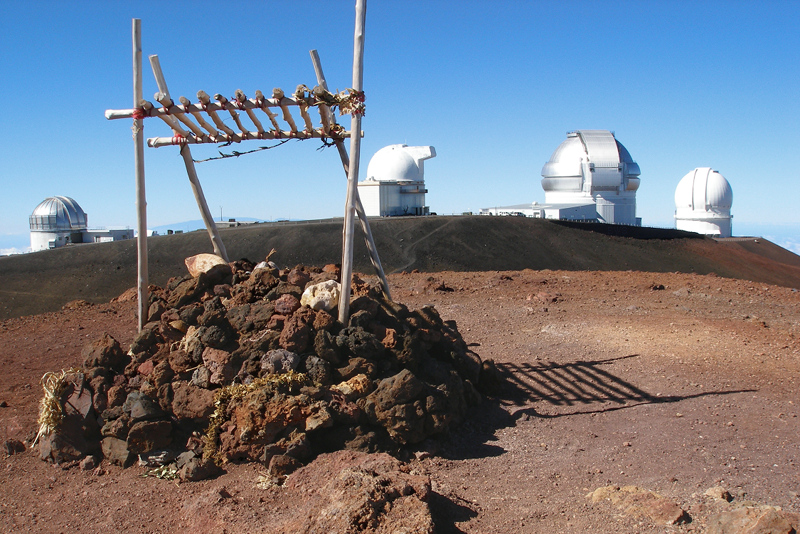
Four observatories from the summit (left to right): United Kingdom Infrared Telescope, UH88, Gemini North, and the Canada–France–Hawaii Telescope

Mauna Kea's great height and the steepness of its flanks provide a better view and a shorter hike than the adjacent Mauna Loa. The height with its risk of altitude sickness, weather concerns, steep road grade, and overall inaccessibility make the volcano dangerous and summit trips difficult. Until the construction of roads in the mid-20th century, only the hardy visited Mauna Kea's upper slopes; hunters tracked game animals, and hikers traveled up the mountain. These travelers used stone cabins constructed by the Civilian Conservation Corps in the 1930s as base camps, and it is from these facilities that the modern mid-level Onizuka Center for International Astronomy telescope support complex is derived. The first Mauna Kea summit road was built in 1964, making the peak accessible to more people.

Today, multiple hiking trails exist, including the Mauna Kea Trail, and by 2007 over 100,000 tourists and 32,000 vehicles were going each year to the Visitor Information Station (VIS) adjacent to the Onizuka Center for International Astronomy. The Mauna Kea Access Road is paved up to the Center at 9,199 feet (2,804 m). One study reported that around a third of visitors and two-thirds of professional astronomers working on the mountain have experienced symptoms of acute altitude sickness. Visitors to the mountain should prepare ahead of time by acclimating at a lower elevation or using a prescription medicine like Diamox. It is strongly recommended to use a four-wheel drive vehicle to drive all the way to the top. Brakes often overheat on the way down and there is no fuel available on Mauna Kea. A free Star Gazing Program was previously held at the VIS every night from 6-10 pm, with the program canceled due to both a change in operating hours and closure due to the ongoing COVID-19 pandemic. Between 5,000 and 6,000 people visit the summit of Mauna Kea each year, and to help ensure safety, and protect the integrity of the mountain, a ranger program was implemented in 2001.

== See also ==
- Evolution of Hawaiian volcanoes
- List of mountain peaks of the United States
  - List of volcanoes of the United States
    - List of mountain peaks of Hawaiʻi
- List of tallest mountains in the Solar System
- List of the highest major summits of the United States
- List of the most isolated major summits of the United States
- List of the most prominent summits of the United States
- List of Ultras of Oceania
