= Hawaii Route 200 =

State highway in Hawaii County, Hawaii

Hawaii Route 200
- Saddle Road, Daniel K. Inouye Highway

Route information
- Maintained by HDOT
- Length: 52.7 mi (84.8 km)

Major junctions
- East end: Route 19 in Hilo
- West end: Route 190 south of Waimea

Location
- Country: United States
- State: Hawaii
- Counties: Hawaii

Highway system
- Routes in Hawaii
| ← Route 197 | → H-201 |
| ← Route 1970 | → Route 3000 |

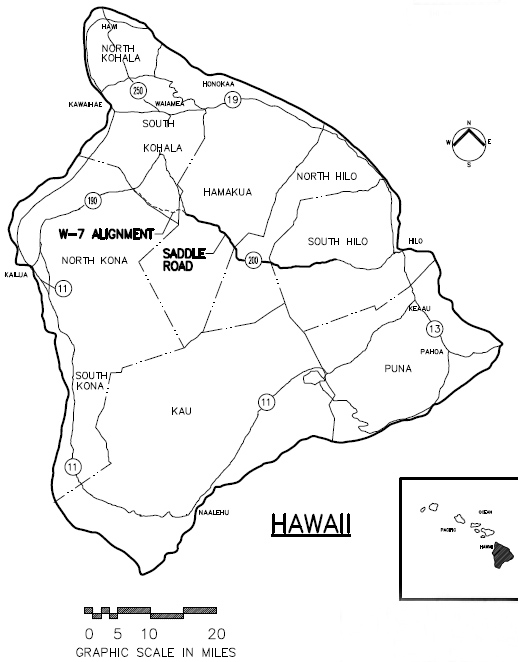
Proposed 2009 alignment

Route 200, known locally as Saddle Road, traverses the width of the Island of Hawaiʻi, from downtown Hilo to its junction with Hawaii Route 190 near Waimea. The road was once considered one of the most dangerous paved roads in the state, with many one-lane bridges and areas of marginally maintained pavement. Most of the road has now been repaved, and major parts have new re-alignments to modern standards. The highway is mostly one-lane in each direction, but there are two lanes on the uphill portions. The highway reaches a maximum elevation of 6,632 feet (2,021 m) and is subject to fog and low visibility. Many rental car companies used to prohibit use of their cars on Saddle Road, but now allow use of the road. The highway experiences heavy use as it provides the shortest driving route from Hilo to Kailua-Kona and access to the slopes of Mauna Loa and the Mauna Kea Observatories.

== Route description ==
=== Waiānuenue Avenue ===
The mile marker 0 is posted in Hilo on the traffic signal at the intersection of Waiānuenue Avenue, Kamehameha Avenue and Bayfront Highway at coordinates 19°43′36″N 155°5′12″W. The route continues inland along Waiānuenue Avenue to a little over a half-mile past the mile 1 where it veers left onto Kaūmana Drive near Gilbert Carvalho Park. Further along, Waiānuenue Avenue is Rainbow Falls Park (Wai means "water" (fresh) in the Hawaiian language; ānuenue means "rainbow". Thus "Rainbow Falls" is rendered as Waiānuenue).

- Total miles = 1.7 (2.7 km)

=== Kaūmana Drive ===
Starting at the “Y” junction adjacent to Gilbert Carvalho Park, Highway 200 continues mauka (uphill) on Kaūmana Drive and provides access to neighborhoods overlooking Hilo. The road is quite narrow and windy with many blind corners, hidden driveways and open drainage ditches. Near mile 4 it passes Kaumana Cave, a lava tube. Just past mile 6 (coordinates 19°40′51″N 155°9′23″W) is the junction with Pūʻainakō Street Extension, (Hawaii Route 2000), completed in September 2004 as a bypass of the above-mentioned windy sections. The intersection with Ua Nahele Street at mile 8 marks the mauka terminus of Kaūmana Drive.

- Total miles = 6.2 miles (10.0 km)

=== Saddle Road ===
The official start of Saddle Road is at the “T” intersection of Ua Nahele Street at mile 8. This is the last neighborhood through which the route will pass. As it has from its beginning in Hilo, Route 200 continues to climb towards the Humuʻula Saddle between Mauna Kea and Mauna Loa. The rainforest of the Hilo Forest Reserve and Upper Waiākea Forest Reserve surround the roadway and begin to thin as the elevation increases. Quality of the asphalt surface is quite good on this side of the crest but there are many curves and rises with limited visual distances. There are no tourist services or other infrastructure on the Saddle Road.

Reconstruction of the sections from mileposts 11 to 19 and 19 to 28 was finished in November 2011 and October 2008, respectively.

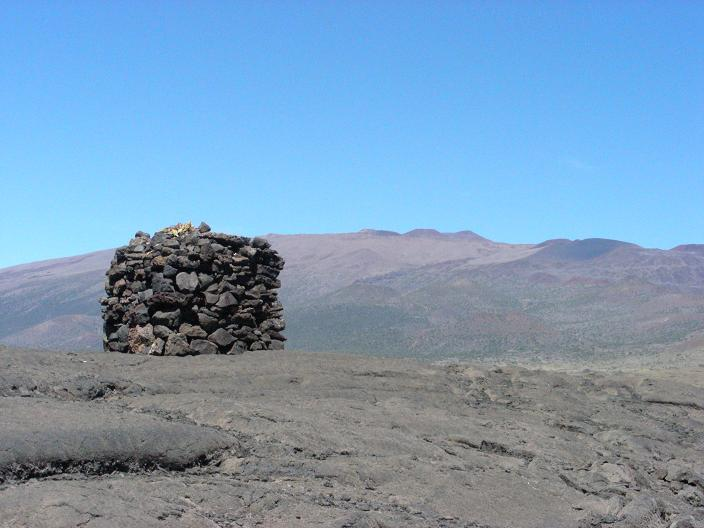
A Hawaiian kuahu (altar) near the junction of Saddle Road and Mauna Kea Access Road, Mauna Kea in the background

The terrain becomes the high lava desert of the Humuʻula Saddle. Two roads intersect Saddle Road close to Puʻu Huluhulu at its crest near mile 28 at 6,632 feet (2,021 m) above the sea level, the Mauna Loa Observatory Road to the south, and the Mauna Kea Summit Road to the north.

The Mauna Loa Observatory Road is an unmarked 17.1 miles (27.5 km) long narrow rough (but paved) road which winds its way towards Mauna Loa Solar Observatory, Mauna Loa Atmospheric Observatory, and AMiBA on the slopes of Mauna Loa. It was connected in 1963 to the old Tom Vance road from 1950.

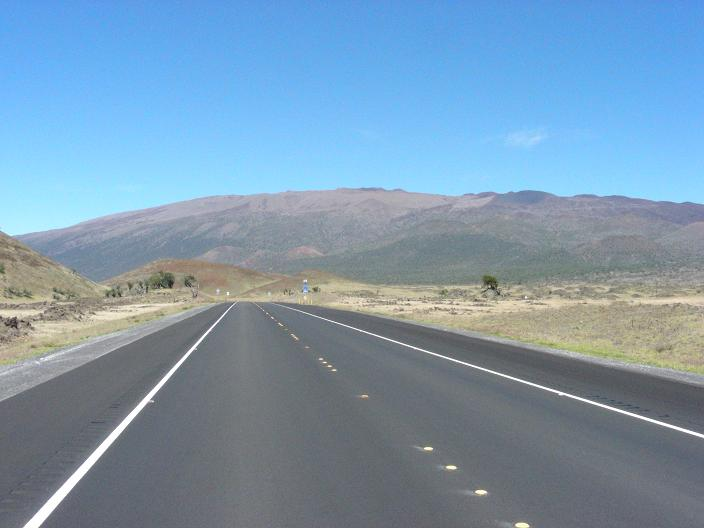
New section of Saddle Road, around mile post 30, Mauna Kea in the background

The Mauna Kea Summit Road (known as John A. Burns Way) provides access to the Onizuka Center for International Astronomy (at elevation 9,300 ft (2,800 m) then climbs Mauna Kea past the Mauna Kea Ice Age Reserve to the height of 13,780 ft (4,200 m) at grades averaging 17% making this the third highest public road in the United States. The road is 14 miles (23 km) long, of which the first 6 miles (to the Onizuka Center) and the last 3 miles (4.8 km) are paved. Puʻu Wēkiu is the highest point in Hawaiʻi at 13,796 ft (4,205 m) and is home to Poliʻahu, Goddess of Snow. Mauna Kea Observatory on the summit, an ideal location for astronomical seeing, is under the jurisdiction of the University of Hawaiʻi Institute for Astronomy.

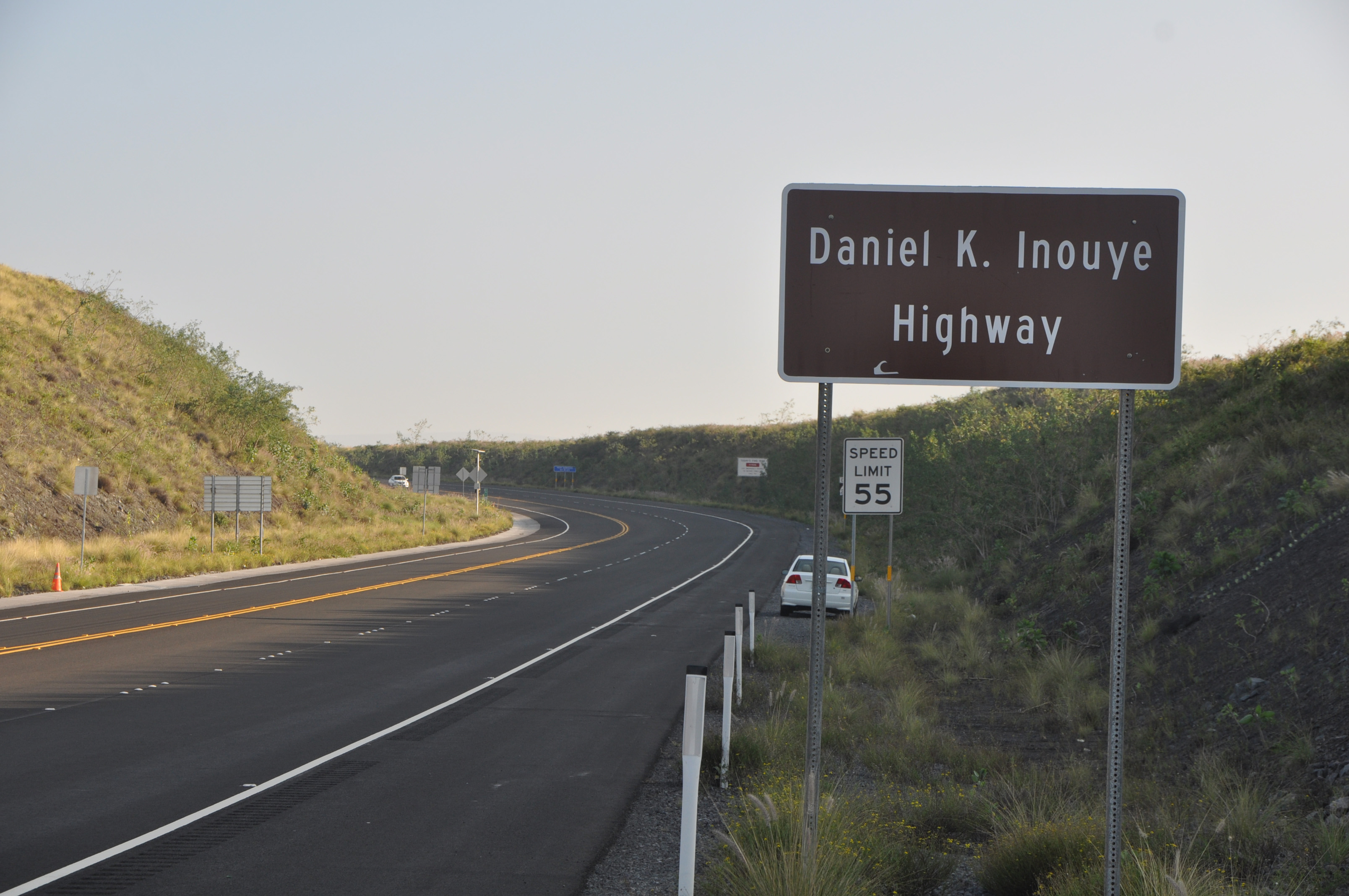
Hawaii Route 200 - "Daniel K. Inouye Highway" Sign

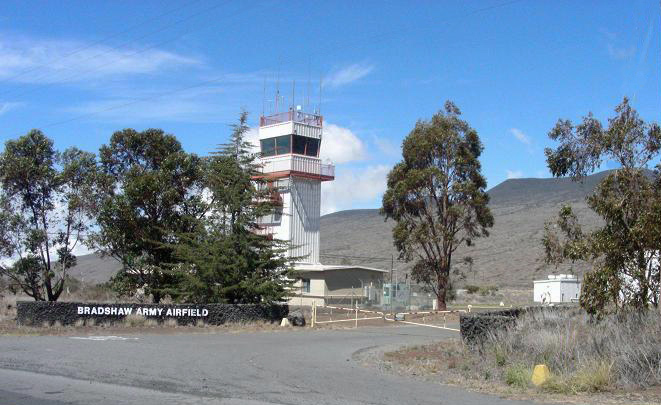
Entrance to Bradshaw Field

West and northwest of these turnoffs, the 6.5-mile (10.5 km) segment of Route 200 from milepost 28 to 35 was dedicated and opened to traffic on May 29, 2007, with Senator Daniel K. Inouye as the keynote speaker and other local dignitaries. The new section was constructed to full federal highway standards, with wide shoulders, rumble strips, good signage and emergency phones at regular intervals.

From milepost 35 to 44 the road passes the main gates of Pōhakuloa Training Area and Bradshaw Army Airfield before continuing across the military reservation. Military vehicles – including armored personnel carriers – occasionally cross or occupy the roadway. Artillery exercises, including live fire, are not uncommon. with batteries set up along the roadway firing towards Mauna Loa. This section of the road was repaved in the summer of 2008, greatly improving the conditions.

On August 18, 2009, the completely rebuilt section, from milepost 35 to 42, opened to public travel. The realignment relocated the highway north to the Mauna Kea side of the Army base and Bradshaw Army Airfield.

A new section starting near mile marker 42 that bypasses Waikiʻi and connects to Māmalahoa Highway near mile marker 14, 19°50′39″N 155°44′53″W opened September 7, 2013. At this time, the highway was officially renamed the Daniel K. Inouye Highway in honor of the late senator from Hawaii.

This new section avoids the old route, where from milepost 44, near Kilohana, to the Māmalahoa Highway the road retained its original character, a narrow ribbon of poorly maintained pavement with crumbling edges. On the old section, there are several one-lane bridges, blind curves and hills. It is common for drivers to negotiate the center of the road to avoid the rough shoulders, moving back into the lane only when necessary to pass traffic proceeding in the opposite direction. The route is quite scenic with views of the coastline, the Hualālai and Kohala volcanoes, winding its way across Parker Ranch and through the development of Waikiʻi.

The original western terminus of Route 200 comes at its junction with Māmalahoa Highway (state route 190) six miles (9.7 km) toward Kona of Waimea (coordinates 19°56′10″N 155°41′14″W).

- Total miles = 45.7 miles (73.5 km)

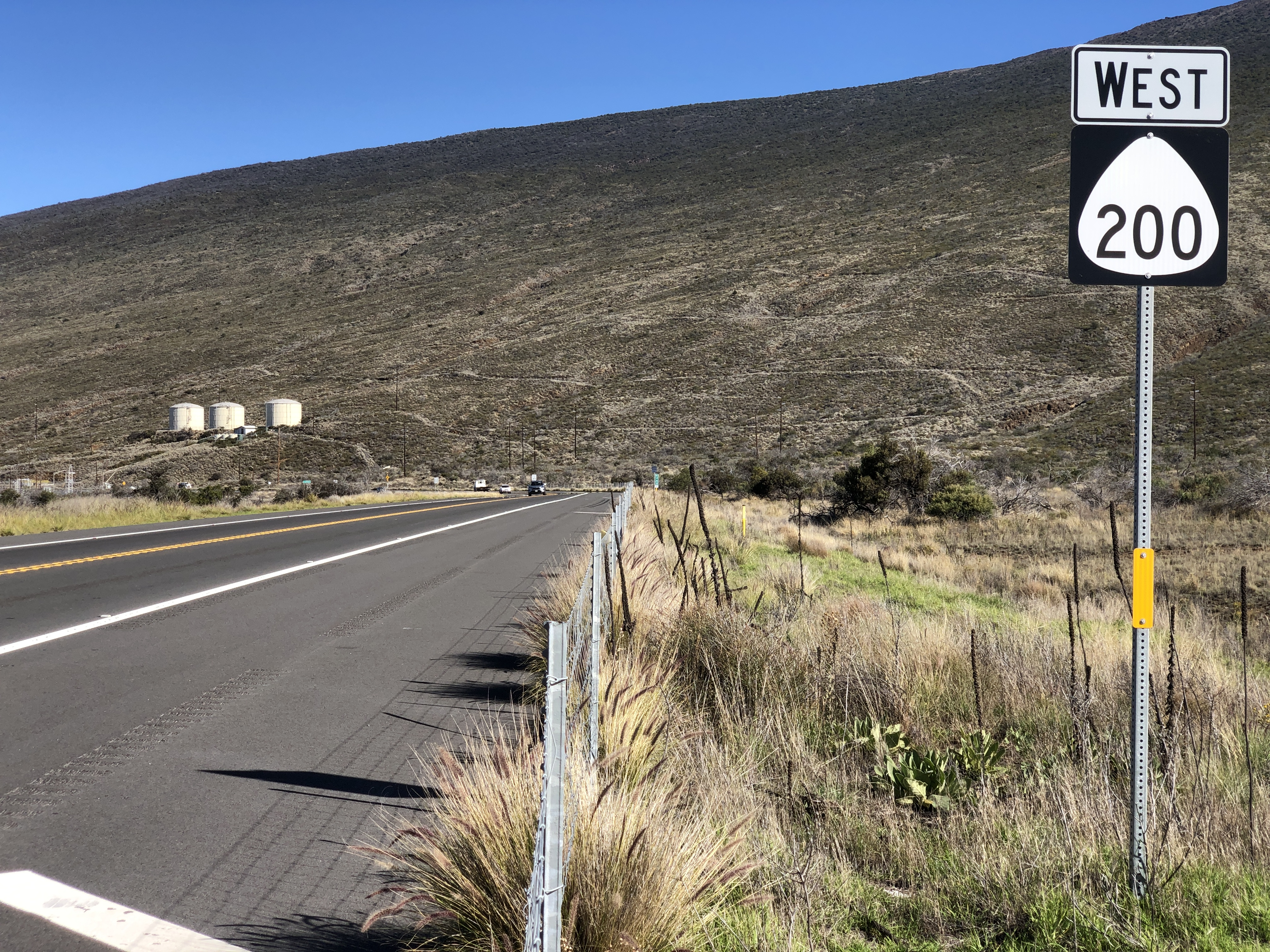
Route 200 westbound near its closest approach to Mauna Kea, at over 6,000 feet (1,800 m) above sea level.

== History ==
In May 1849, Minister of Finance Gerrit P. Judd proposed building a road directly between the two population centers of the Island of Hawaiʻi. Using prison labor, it started near Holualoa Bay at 19°35′57″N 155°58′26″W and proceeded in a straight line up to the plateau south of Hualālai. After ten years only about 12 miles (19 km) were completed, when work was abandoned at 19°38′38″N 155°45′12″W when the 1859 eruption of Mauna Loa blocked its path. Although destroyed at lower elevations due to residential development, it can still be seen on maps as the "Judd Trail".

While planning for the defense of the Hawaiian Islands in the wake of the attack on Pearl Harbor, the U. S. Army hastily built an access road in 1943 across the Humuʻula plateau of Parker Ranch at 19°41′44″N 155°29′8″W. Since it was not intended as a civilian road, the simple gravel path was built by the Civilian Conservation Corps and the US Army Corps of Engineers in case of an invasion. Military vehicles of all types and treads traversed the Island for the next three years.

Following the end of World War II in 1945, the Army turned over jurisdiction of the road to the Territory of Hawaiʻi and it was designated "State Route 20". However, the territorial government had few funds to maintain the road, let alone upgrade it to civilian standards. Much of the paving dates from 1949.

About the same time, Tom Vance, who had earlier supervised building a highway up Mauna Loa named for Governor Ingram Stainback, secretly used his prison laborers to start a more direct Hilo-Kona road. He started at a camp 19°38′12″N 155°28′52″W (still called "Vance" on USGS maps) which was exactly midway between Hilo and Kealakekua. The road extended in a straight line, heading for the pass between Hualālai and Mauna Loa. In 1950, the camp caught fire after construction reached 19°37′17″N 155°35′57″W. The public refused to allocate more funding when they discovered about US$1 million had already been spent, so the project was also abandoned.

After the islands became the State of Hawaii in 1959, Saddle Road was handed to the County of Hawaiʻi and for many years only minimal maintenance was performed, leading to generally poor conditions and the source of the road's notorious reputation.

Since 1992, there has been increased attention on the road, with efforts to rebuild and renovate the highway into a practical cross-island route. This resulted in repaving some sections and complete rebuilding of others. The entire road is now well paved, and in the uphill sections there is a separate lane for trucks and slower cars.

== Future ==
There are plans to complete a section past Māmalahoa Highway which will intersect the Queen Kaʻahumanu Highway (state route 19) to support cross-island commuting by tourists and resort employees. The route was changed after the 2006 explain of military exercise areas. This represents a realignment of the island’s traffic patterns and converts it into a modern state highway.

== Major intersections ==
The entire route is in Hawaii County.

| Location | mi | km | Destinations | Notes |
|---|---|---|---|---|
| Hilo | 0.0 | 0.0 | Route 19 (Kamehameha Avenue / Bayfront Highway) | |
| Hilo | 6.0 | 9.7 | Route 2000 (Pūʻāinakō Street Extension) | |
| Waimea | 52.7 | 84.8 | Route 190 (Māmalahoa Highway) | |
1.000 mi = 1.609 km; 1.000 km = 0.621 mi

== Related route ==
Hawaii Route 2000
- Location: Hilo
- Length: 6.2 mi (10.0 km)

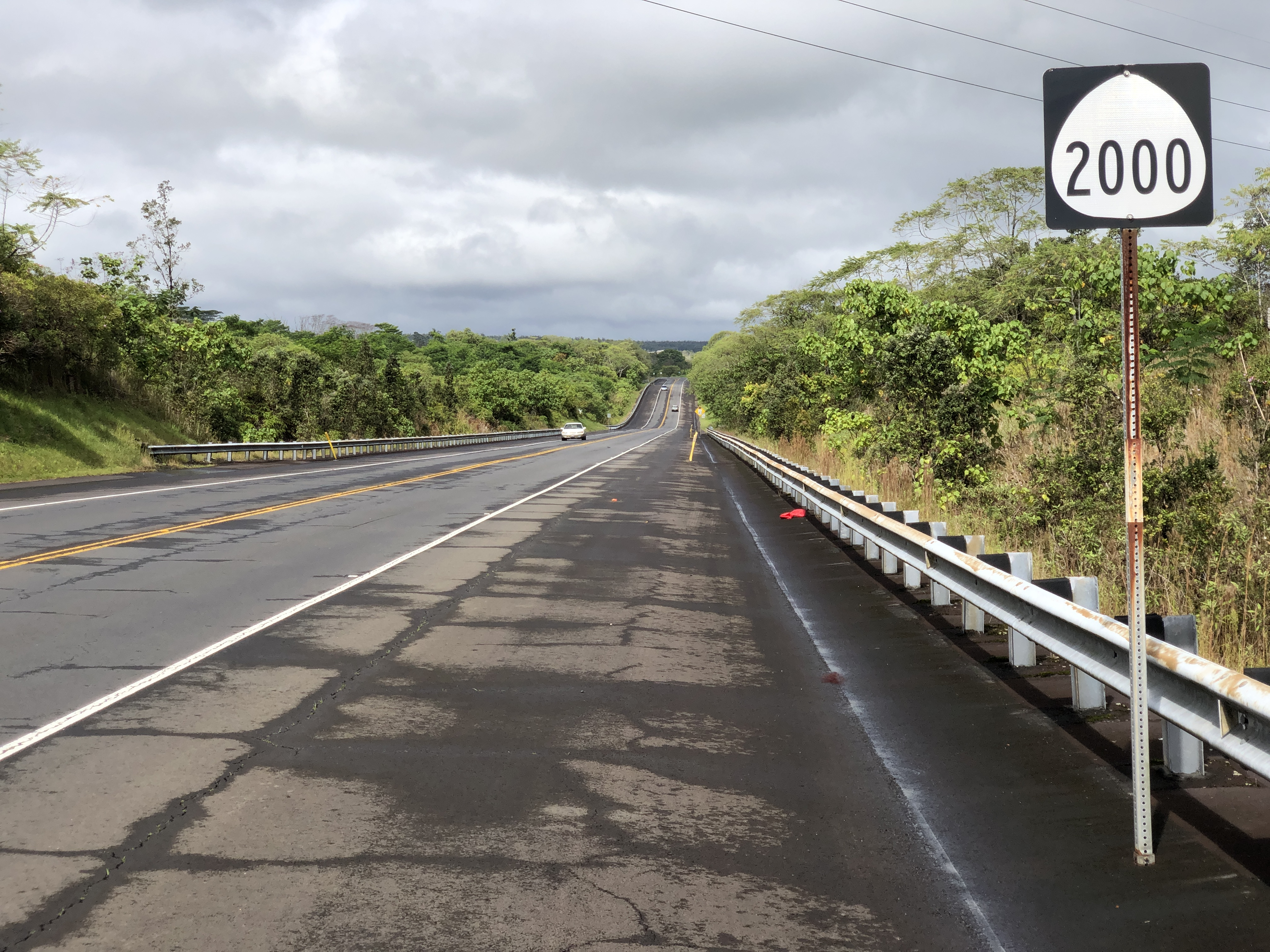
Route 2000 westbound near Kaumana

Hawaii Route 2000 is a 6.2-mile (10.0 km) road on the island of Hawaii, in the state of Hawaii. The road's western terminus is at Hawaii Route 200 (known as the Saddle Road). The eastern terminus is at Hawaii Route 11 (known as the Hawaii Belt Road) in Hilo where the Prince Kūhiō Plaza shopping center is located. Route 2000 is called Pūʻāinakō Street Extension, East Pūʻāinakō Street, and West Pūʻāinakō Street. The project was planned since 1995.

== See also ==
- List of state highways in Hawaii
- List of highways numbered 200
