= Leilani Estates, Hawaii =

Census-designated place in the United States

Leilani Estates
- Census-designated place
- Location in Hawaiʻi County and the state of Hawaii
- Coordinates: 19°28′25″N 154°55′13″W
- Country: United States
- State: Hawaii
- County: Hawaiʻi

Area
  - Total: 4.03 sq mi (10.45 km^{2})
  - Land: 4.03 sq mi (10.45 km^{2})
  - Water: 0 sq mi (0.00 km^{2})
- Elevation: 771 ft (235 m)

Population (2020)
  - Total: 1,139
  - Density: 280/sq mi (109/km^{2})
- Time zone: UTC-10 (Hawaii-Aleutian Standard Time Zone)
- ZIP code: 96778
- Area code: 808
- FIPS code: 15-44562
- GNIS feature ID: 1852580

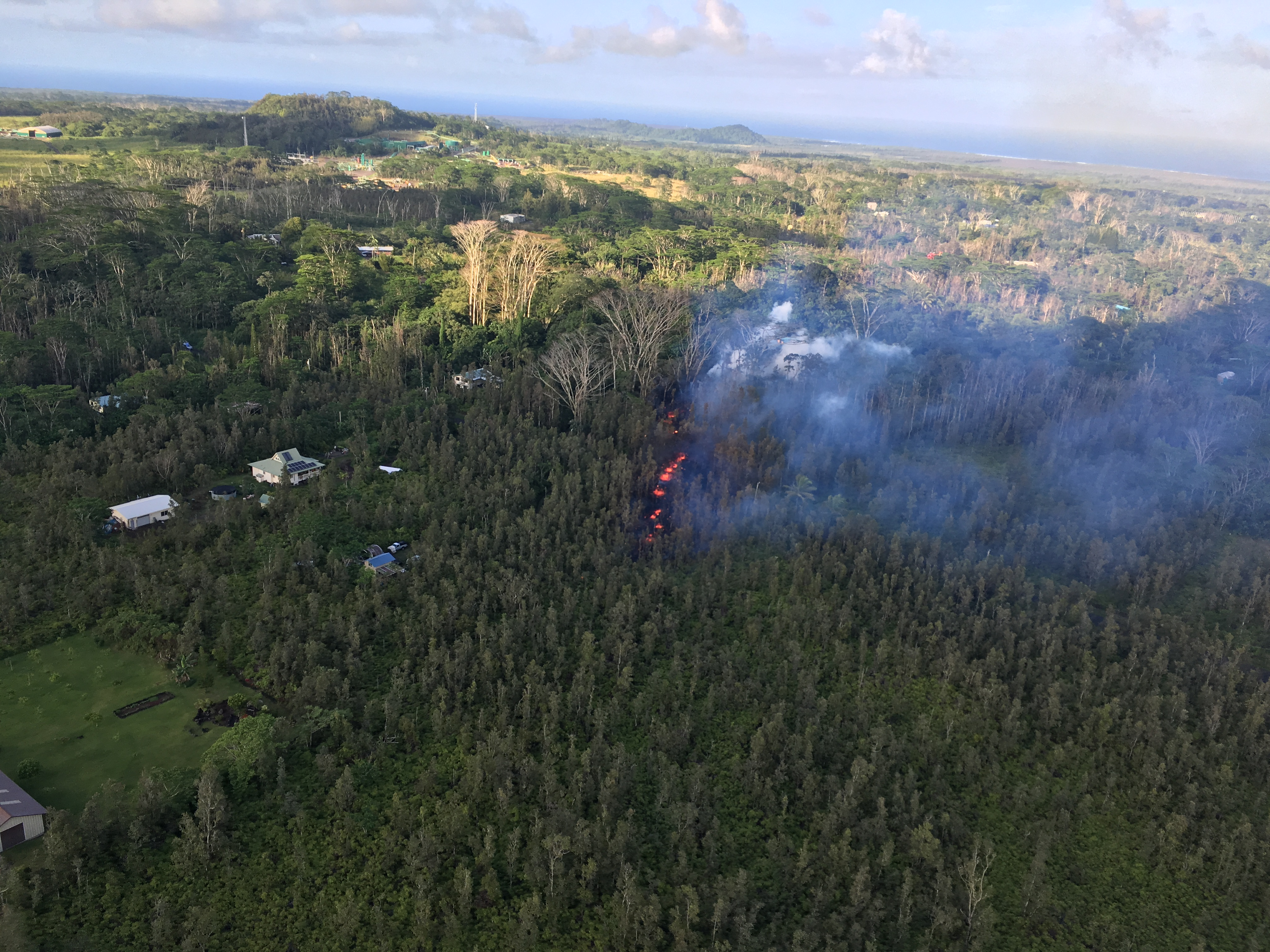
Eruption in the Leilani Estates subdivision (May 3, 2018)

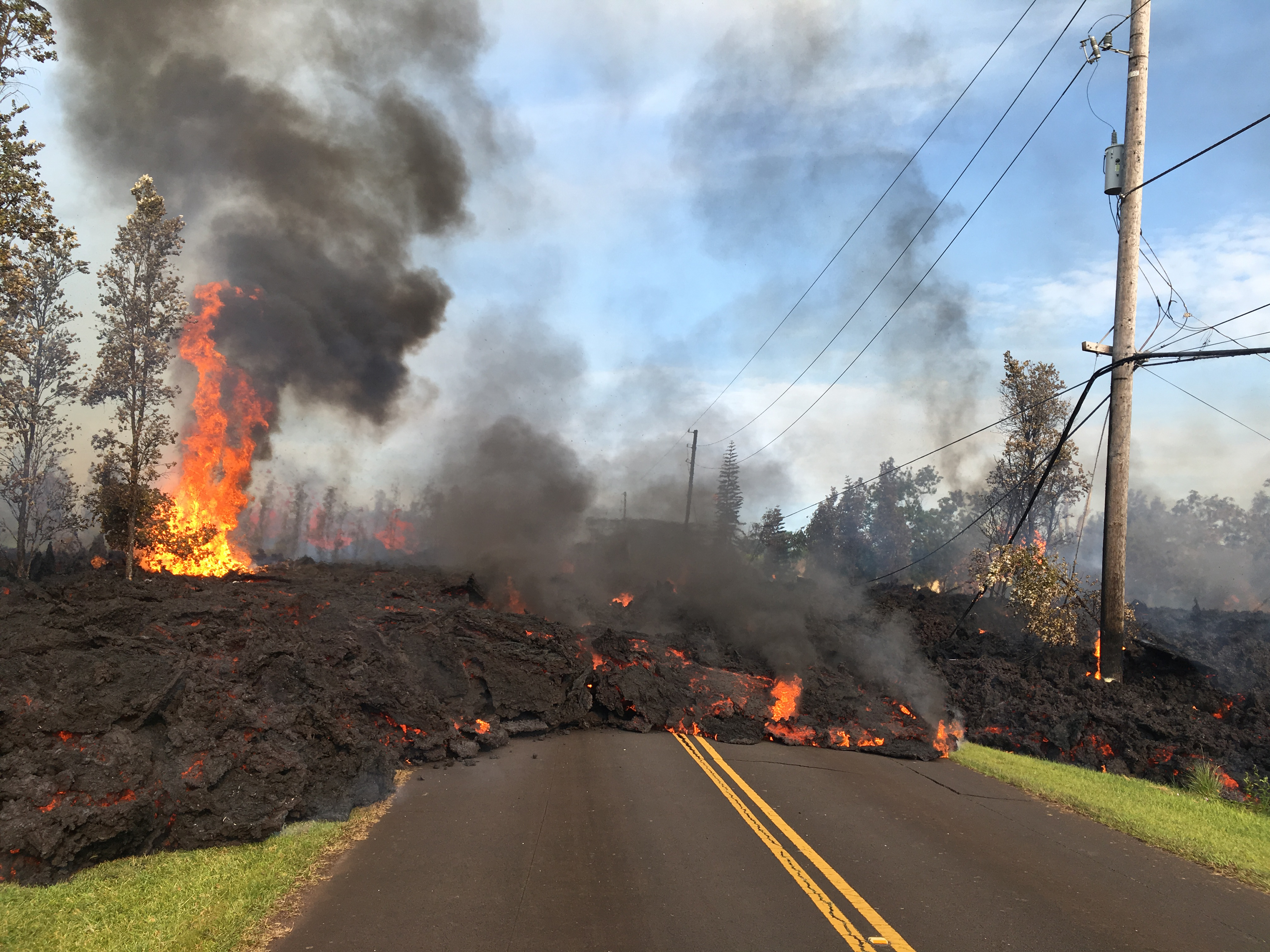
Lava from a fissure slowly advanced to the northeast on Hoʻokupu Street in Leilani Estates subdivision (May 5, 2018)

Leilani Estates is a census-designated place (CDP) in Hawaiʻi County, Hawaii, United States located in the District of Puna. The subdivision was formed in 1964. The population was 1,139 at the 2020 census, down from 1,560 at the 2010 census, and up from 1,046 at the 2000 census.

The 2018 lower Puna eruption of Kīlauea Volcano, which occurred within and around the subdivision, claimed many homes and displaced an unknown number of Leilani Estates residents. Accessing the entire resulting solid lava rock flow field has been prohibited, as per the Mayor's 12/6/18 Emergency Proclamation, with fines up to $5,000 for violations. As of January 2019, in further effort to prevent the private subdivision from becoming a public attraction, the Leilani Community Association began enforcing regulations regarding no parking on private roads, no trespassing on private property, and no tours being conducted in the subdivision.

== Geography ==
Leilani Estates is located near the eastern tip of the island of Hawaiʻi. It is 3 miles (5 km) south of Pāhoa and 23 miles (37 km) south of Hilo. It is bordered to the southeast by the Malama Kī Forest Reserve.

According to the United States Census Bureau, the CDP has a total area of 4.03 square miles (10.45 km^{2}), all of it land.

Leilani Estates is located directly on a stretch of the lower East Rift Zone of Kīlauea volcano, in lava flow hazard zone 1. Zone 1 includes the summit and rift zones of active volcanoes—new eruptive vents can spawn anywhere inside this zone. Approximately 10% or 50 square miles (100 km^{2}) out of the 500 square miles (1,000 km^{2}) of Puna have been covered by lava flows since 1790.

=== 2018 eruption ===
Of the 24 total volcanic fissure vents that formed during the event, 14 erupted lava to varying degrees within Leilani Estates. ʻAhuʻailāʻau (initially designated Fissure 8) on Luana St. was the dominant vent that produced the most output of lava, with fountaining as high as 330 feet and flow front advancement as fast as 76 m/h as it reached the ocean miles below Leilani Estates. By the time the eruption ceased on August 9 of 2018, around 200 homes had been destroyed within the subdivision.

== Demographics ==
Historical population
Census	Pop.	Note	%±
2020	1,139		—
U.S. Decennial Census

=== 2020 census ===
As of the 2020 census, Leilani Estates had a population of 1,139. The median age was 55.0 years. 16.0% of residents were under the age of 18 and 31.5% of residents were 65 years of age or older. For every 100 females there were 114.9 males, and for every 100 females age 18 and over there were 116.0 males age 18 and over.

0.0% of residents lived in urban areas, while 100.0% lived in rural areas.

There were 514 households in Leilani Estates, of which 18.3% had children under the age of 18 living in them. Of all households, 35.0% were married-couple households, 30.7% were households with a male householder and no spouse or partner present, and 23.7% were households with a female householder and no spouse or partner present. About 33.2% of all households were made up of individuals and 18.1% had someone living alone who was 65 years of age or older.

There were 657 housing units, of which 21.8% were vacant. The homeowner vacancy rate was 4.8% and the rental vacancy rate was 15.5%.

Racial composition as of the 2020 census
Race	Number	Percent
White	702	61.6%
Black or African American	20	1.8%
American Indian and Alaska Native	9	0.8%
Asian	40	3.5%
Native Hawaiian and Other Pacific Islander	89	7.8%
Some other race	25	2.2%
Two or more races	254	22.3%
Hispanic or Latino (of any race)	110	9.7%

=== 2010 census ===
As of the census of 2010, there were 1,560 people in 696 households residing in the CDP. The population density was 371.4 inhabitants per square mile (143.4/km^{2}). There were 807 housing units at an average density of 192.1 per square mile (74.2/km^{2}). The racial makeup of the CDP was 63.4% White, 1.4% African American, 1.8% American Indian & Alaska Native, 6.1% Asian, 6.2% Native Hawaiian & Pacific Islander, 1.2% from other races, and 20.0% from two or more races. Hispanic or Latino of any race were 9.8% of the population.

There were 696 households, out of which 18.1% had children under the age of 18 living with them. The average household size was 2.24.

In the Leilani Estates CDP the population was spread out, with 17.4% under the age of 18, 6.9% from 18 to 24, 11.7% from 25 to 34, 17.6% from 35 to 49, 32.9% from 50 to 64, and 13.4% who were 65 years of age or older. For every 100 females, there were 113.1 males. For every 100 males there were 88.4 females.

=== 2000 census ===
The median income for a household in the CDP at the 2000 census was $31,540, and the median income for a family in 2000 was $32,692. Males had a median income of $30,500 versus $22,875 for females in 2000. The per capita income for the CDP in 2000 was $15,522. About 13.7% of families and 21.9% of the population were below the poverty line in 2000, including 16.4% of those under age 18 and 25.5% of those age 65 or over.
