= Green Lake (Hawaii) =

Lake of the United States

- Ka Wai o Pele
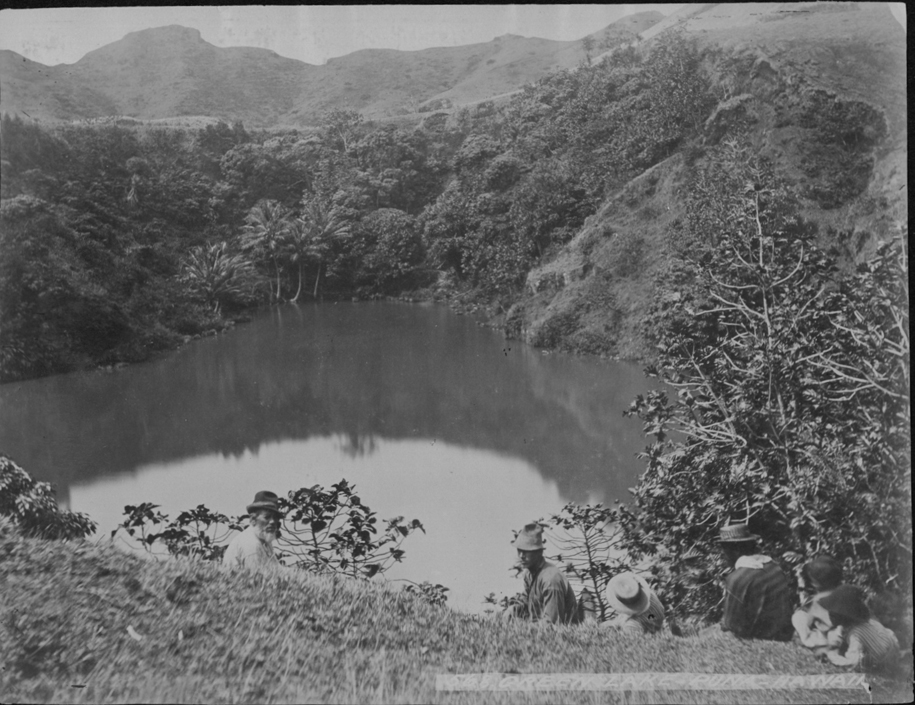
- Green Lake, photographed in the 1890s

- Location within Hawaii Location within Pacific Ocean
- Location: Hawaiʻi, United States
- Coordinates: 19°30′08″N 154°50′22″W
- Type: Volcanic crater lake
- Basin countries: United States
- Surface area: 0.5 ha (1.2 acres)
- Max. depth: 61 m (200 ft)

Green Lake (Hawaiian: Ka Wai o Pele) was a freshwater crater lake in Puʻu Kapoho crater on the island of Hawaiʻi. With a surface area of 0.8 hectares (2.0 acres) and a maximum depth of 61 metres (200 ft), it was the largest natural freshwater lake in the Hawaiian Islands, and, along with Lake Waiau, was one of two freshwater lakes on Hawaiʻi Island.

Hawaiian myths state that the lake was the first place visited by Pele, the volcano deity. The lake was a popular swimming spot for locals and tourists. Extensive vegetation, mainly Hibiscus tiliaceus, overhung the lake, shading about twenty percent of the lake's surface.

On June 2, 2018, the lake was destroyed when lava flowing from Kīlauea's lower Puna eruption boiled it away, completely filling the basin. The eruption dissolved the island's largest body of freshwater in only five hours.

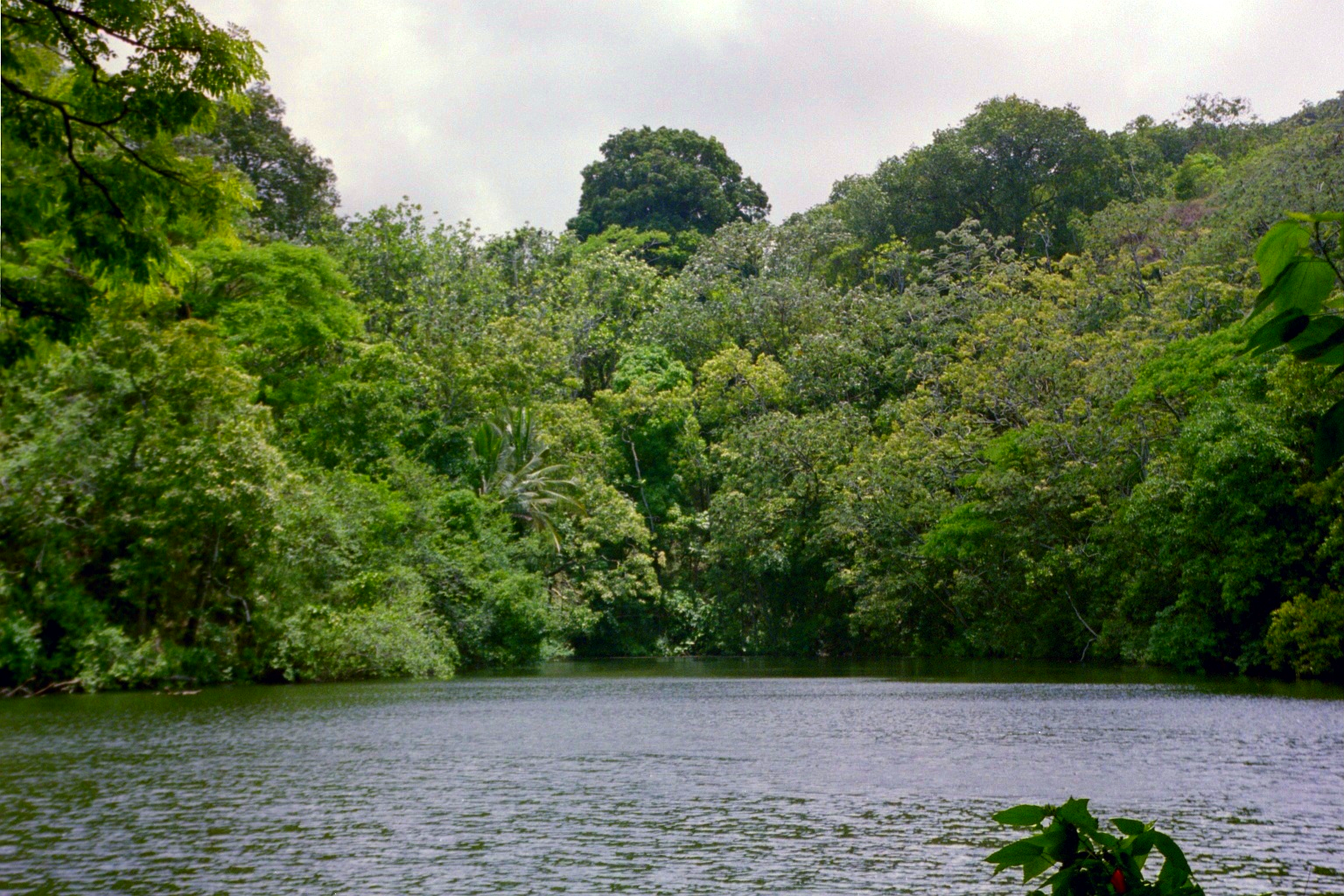
Ka Wai o Pele

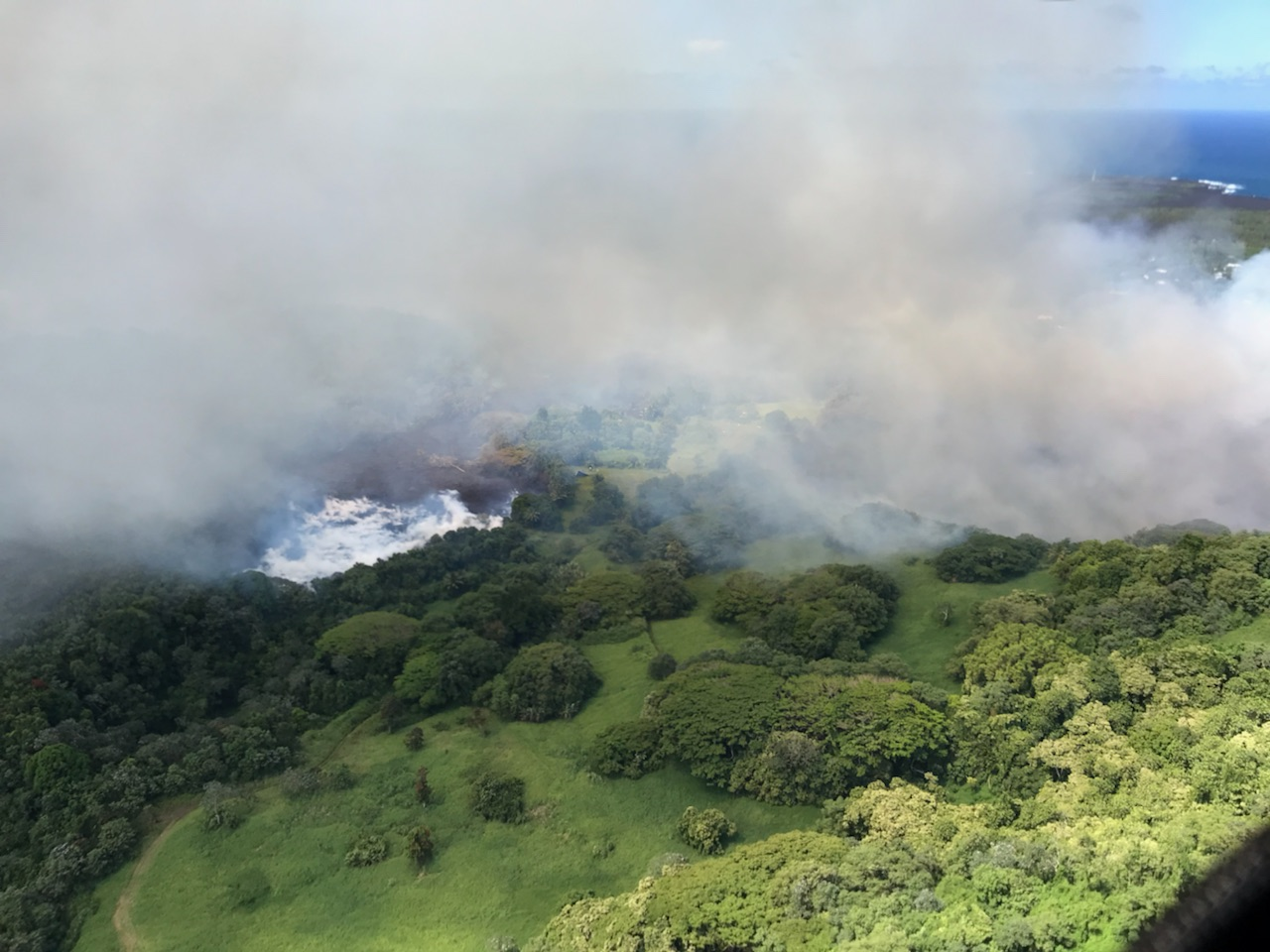
Aerial photograph of lava flows evaporating Green Lake on June 2, 2018

== See also ==
- Halaliʻi Lake
- Halulu Lake
