= Ahalanui =

Ahupuaʻa in Hawaii, United States

Coordinates: 19.4684905°N 154.8329829°W

Ahalanui is the name of an ahupuaʻa and was the Hawaiian name for a Hawaiʻi County-managed beach park in the district of Puna. During the 2018 lower Puna eruption the area was covered by lava.
