= 2018 lower Puna eruption =

Volcanic eruption on Hawaiʻi Island

2018 Lower Puna eruption
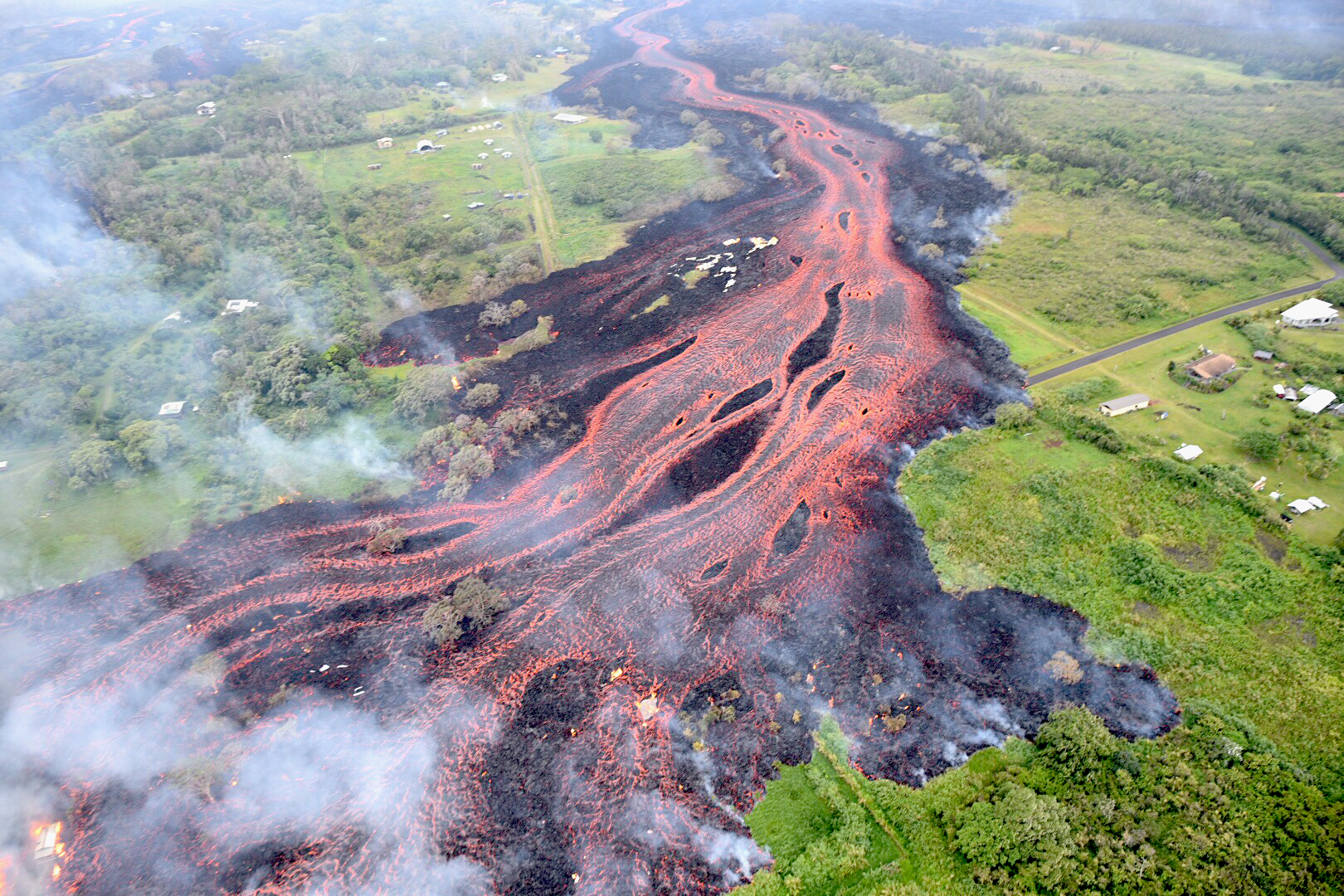
- ʻAʻā lava flows emerging from the elongated fissure 16–20 form channels on May 19, 2018
- Volcano: Kīlauea's Lower East rift zone
- Start date: May 3, 2018
- End date: August 4, 2018
- Type: Fissure eruption
- Location: Hawaii Island, Hawaii, United States; 19.463°N 154.899°W
- Impact: 24 injuries; lava fountains, lava flows; at least $800 million (2018 USD) in property damage; volcanic gas and earthquakes forced the evacuation of populated areas and destroyed houses, roads, and utilities.

The 2018 lower Puna eruption was a volcanic event on the island of Hawaiʻi, on Kīlauea volcano's East Rift Zone that began on May 3, 2018. It is related to the larger eruption of Kīlauea that began on January 3, 1983, though some volcanologists and USGS scientists have discussed whether to classify it as a new eruption. Outbreaks of lava fountains up to 300 feet (90 m) high, lava flows, and volcanic gas in the Leilani Estates subdivision were preceded by earthquakes and ground deformation that created cracks in the roads.

On May 4, a 6.9 magnitude earthquake hit Puna. By May 27, 2018, 24 fissures had erupted lava in and near the Leilani Estates and Lanipuna Gardens subdivisions. The eruption forced the evacuation of approximately two thousand residents. The Puna Geothermal Venture, which provided one-quarter of the island's electricity, was forced to shut down and was later damaged by lava. The fissures had sent lava rivers that buried part of Hawaii Route 137 on May 19, and began flowing into the ocean.

On May 29, lava from a new northeastern flow overran Hawaii Route 132, cutting the access between Kapoho and Pāhoa. The massive lava flow reached the Pacific Ocean at Kapoho Bay on June 4. Lava entered the Kapoho Crater and evaporated Green Lake, which had been the largest natural freshwater lake in Hawaiʻi. On the night of June 4–5, the northeastern flow of lava speedily moved forward and destroyed the subdivision of Vacationland Hawaii. By June 5, Kapoho Bay had been filled in with lava now forming a point where the bay had been. The volcanic activity was the most destructive in the United States since the 1980 eruption of Mount St. Helens.

By August 7, 13.7 square miles (35 km^{2}) of land had been covered by lava flows. About 875 acres (3.54 km^{2}) of new land has been created in the ocean. The official number of houses destroyed by the eruption reached 700 on July 9. It was estimated that recovery efforts would cost more than $800 million (2018 USD). By early August the eruption had almost completely subsided, and on December 5, it was declared to have ended after three months of inactivity.

== Background ==
The volcanic event in Puna was the 62nd episode of Kīlauea's east rift zone eruption that began in January 1983. Puʻu ʻŌʻō had become a prominent volcanic cone 12 mi (19 km) east of the summit caldera of Kīlauea, since the 1983 eruption's beginning. In the 1980s and 1990s, Puʻu ʻŌʻō produced lava flows that destroyed the nearby Royal Gardens subdivision and the settlement of Kapaʻahu. In 1990, lava flows from the Kūpaʻianahā vent of Kīlauea, downrift from Puʻu ʻŌʻō, destroyed and partly buried most of the nearby towns of Kalapana and Kaimū.

On April 30, 2018, the crater floor of the cone of Puʻu ʻŌʻō collapsed and the summit lava lake level in Halemaʻumaʻu dropped significantly. In the first two days of May, hundreds of small earthquakes were detected on Kīlauea's East rift zone, leading officials to issue evacuation warnings for some residents of the Puna District. On May 2, 2018, the US Geological Survey reported that ground deformation resulting from magma intruding beneath the Leilani Estates subdivision had caused ground cracks to form on roads in and around the subdivision.

In connection with the eruption and its possible effects on the Hilina Slump, the Hawaiian Volcano Observatory published information concluding that the chance of a catastrophic collapse would be incredibly remote.

== Eruption ==
=== Earthquakes and Leilani Estates fissures ===
On May 3, 2018, after a 5.0 earthquake earlier in the day, steaming ground cracks opened in Leilani Estates and began to spew lava, causing evacuations of the Leilani Estates and Lanipuna Gardens subdivisions. The outbreak marked the beginning of the 62nd episode of the east rift zone eruption that began in January 1983. That evening, Hawaii Governor David Ige activated the state National Guard to help with the evacuation process.

The next day, May 4, two homes were reported destroyed in Leilani Estates from three erupting vents. The Hawaii County Civil Defense Agency reported high levels of toxic sulfur dioxide gas in the area, and Talmadge Magno, the Civil Defense Administrator for Hawaiʻi County, stated that power lines had melted off poles from the heat. The Puna Geothermal Venture (PGV), a power station, was shut down on 22 May 2018; the geothermal power plant provided approximately 25% of the Big Island's power, but its shutdown was later stated not to present a risk to power on the island. A Temporary Flight Restriction area was declared by the FAA to restrict flights below 3,000 feet AGL in the eruption area.

A 6.9 magnitude earthquake occurred on May 4 that the United States Geological Survey said was related to the eruptions. The earthquake was the strongest to hit the state since 1975. On May 6, Hawaiʻi County Civil Defense reported that 26 houses had been destroyed by lava or fires in Leilani Estates. Lava fountains up to 300 feet (90 m) were observed in the subdivision. The lava vents formed a northeast–southwest line; officials were concerned about potential damage to a water main in the area.

On May 7, 1,700 people had been ordered to evacuate their homes. Two hundred residents and their pets were in two Red Cross shelters and hundreds more were staying with family and friends. Several first responders were sickened by sulfur dioxide gas.

Also on May 7, the International Charter on Space and Major Disasters was activated, for humanitarian use of satellite data. (The USGS used Sentinel2 and Arirang-2.)

By May 9, another home had been destroyed, along with other structures. The fifteenth fissure opened near the entrance to Lanipuna Gardens and added more lava to the nearly 117 acres (47 ha) covered since May 3.

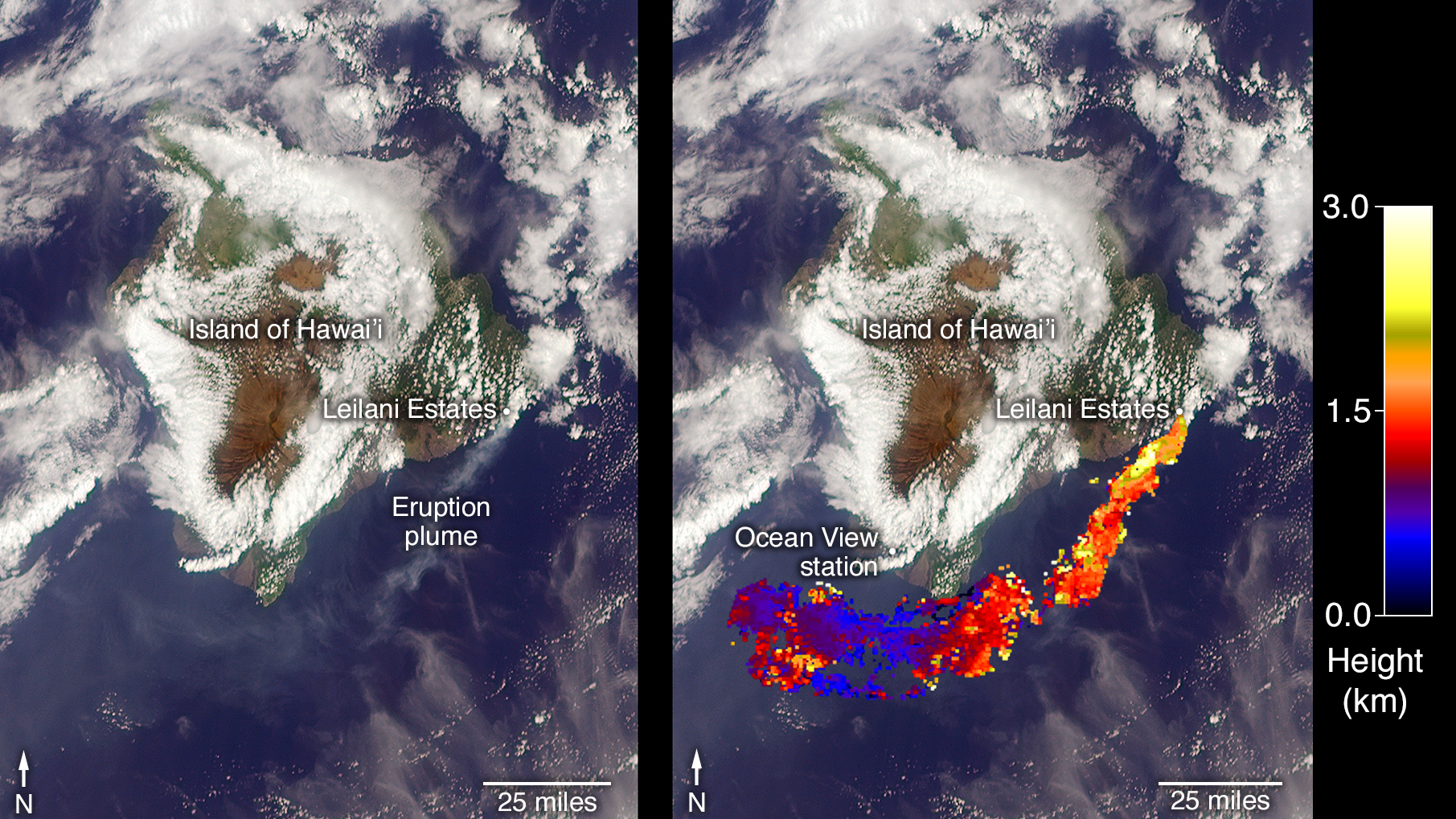
Ash from Kilauea Eruption, right image shows the height of the plume by color.

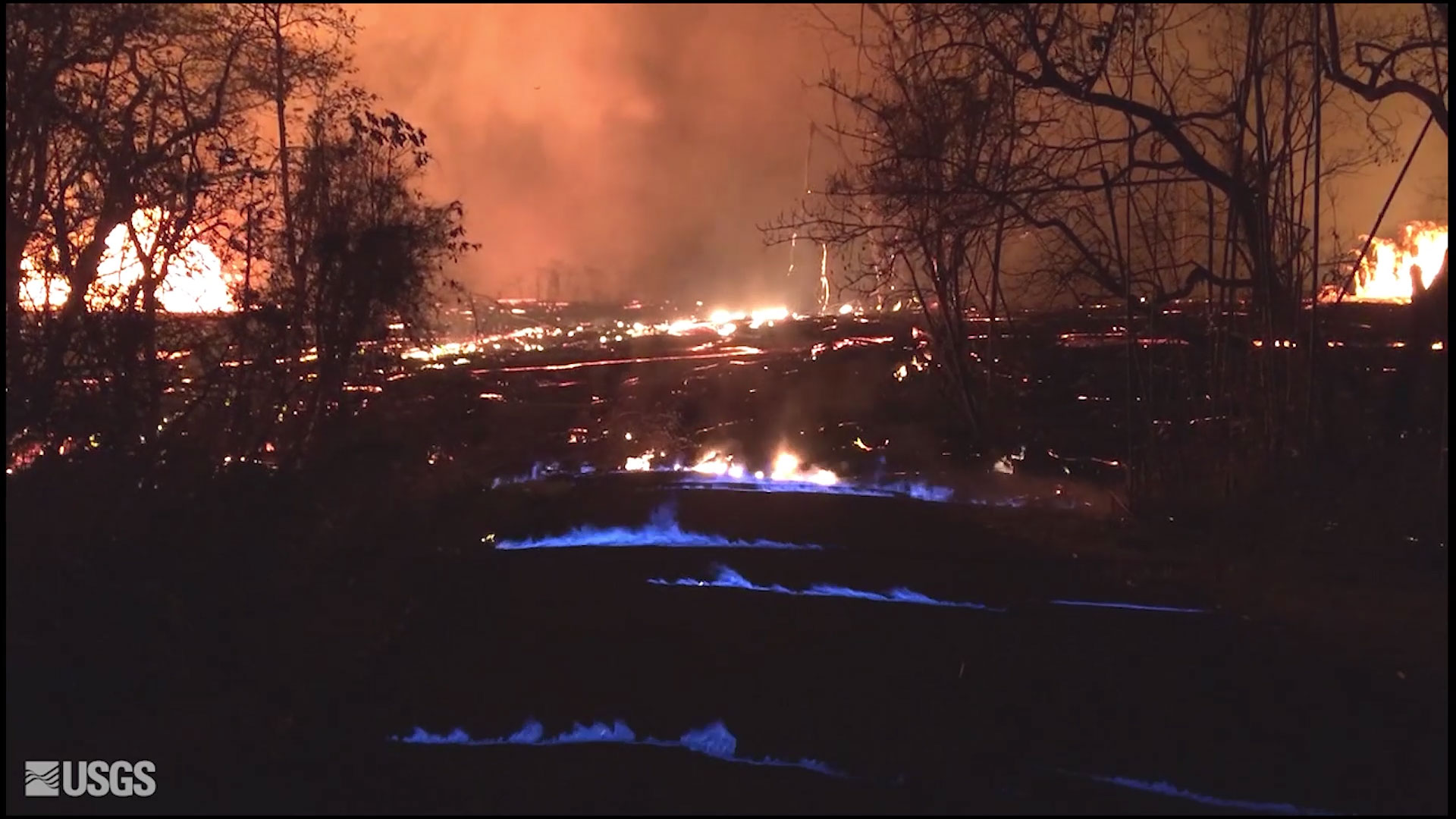
Blue flames from burning methane gas in Leilani Estates, on 22 May 2018, 11:30 p.m. HST.

Aerial view of fissure 17 around 4:30 p.m. HST. (May 14, 2018)

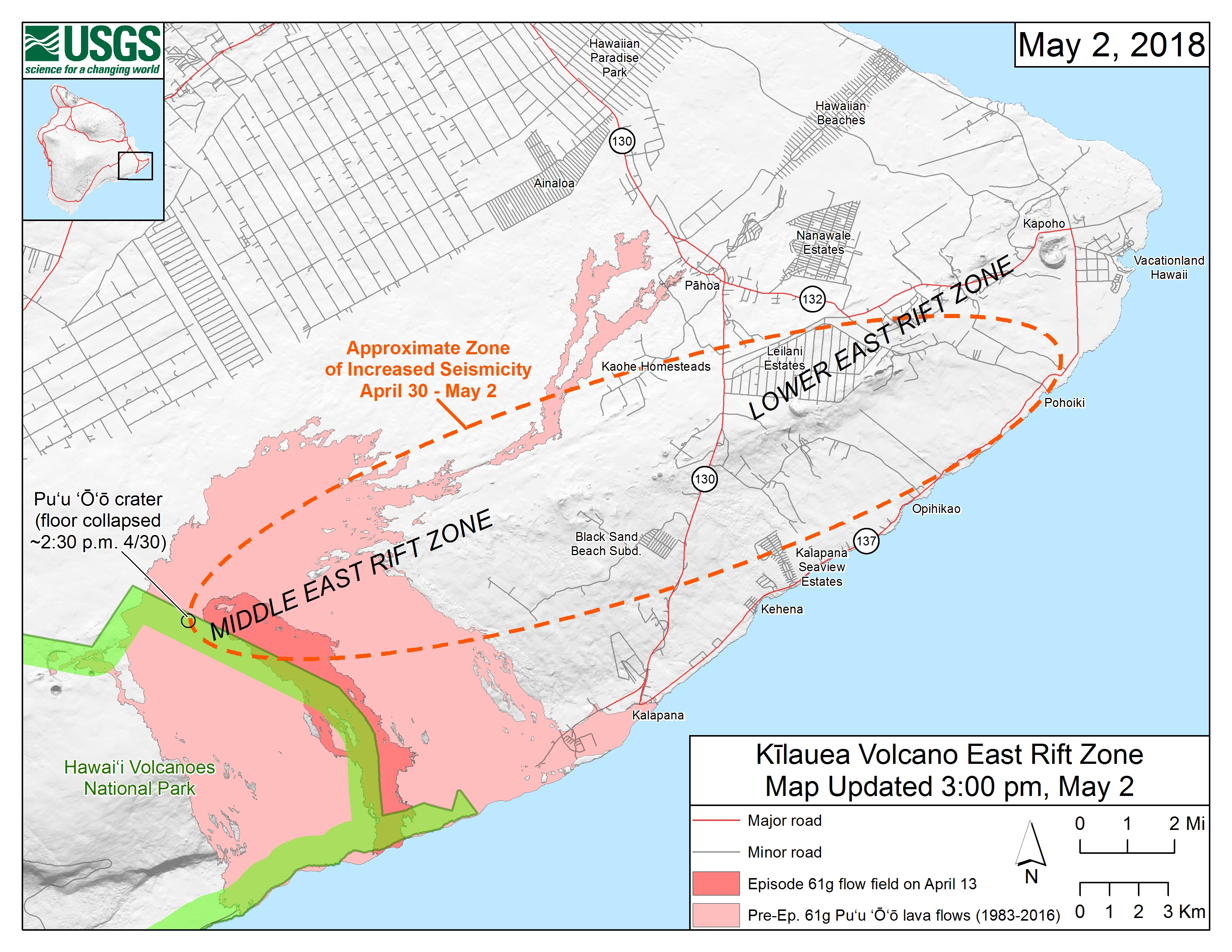
Map of ongoing intrusion and earthquake activity along Kīlauea's East Rift Zone (May 2, 2018)

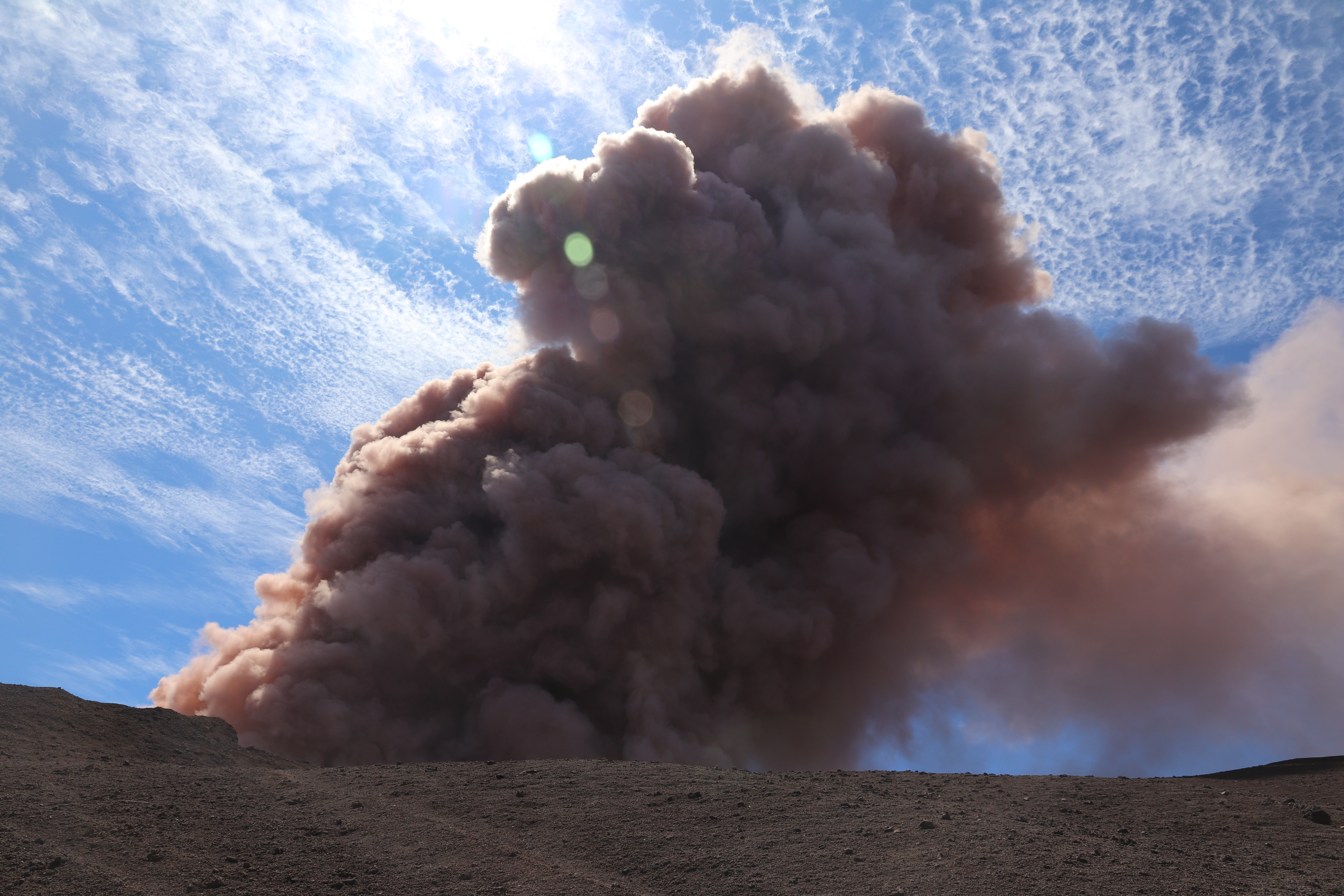
Collapse in the crater of Puʻu ʻŌʻō, creating an ash plume (May 3, 2018)

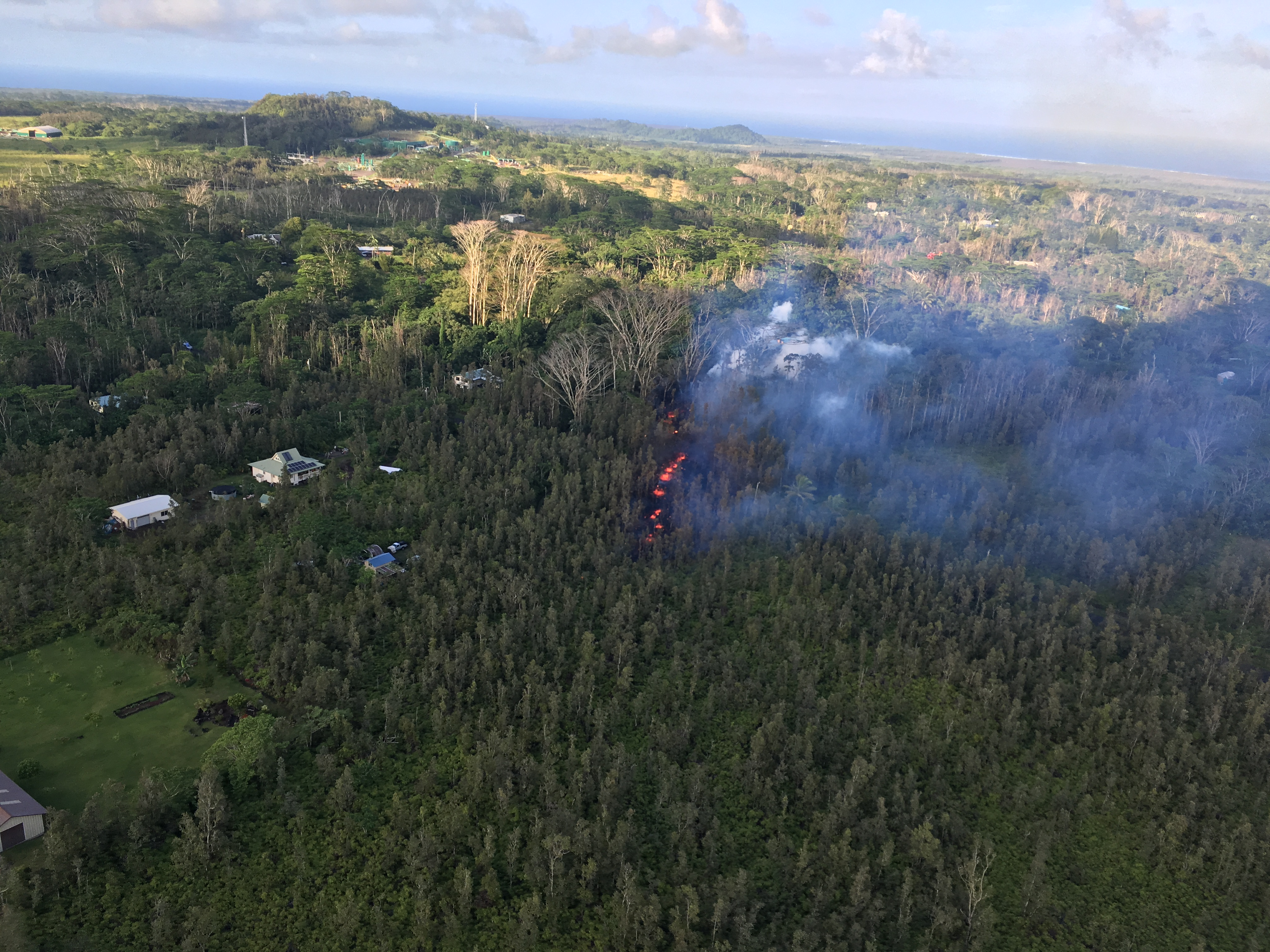
Eruption in the Leilani Estates subdivision (May 3, 2018)

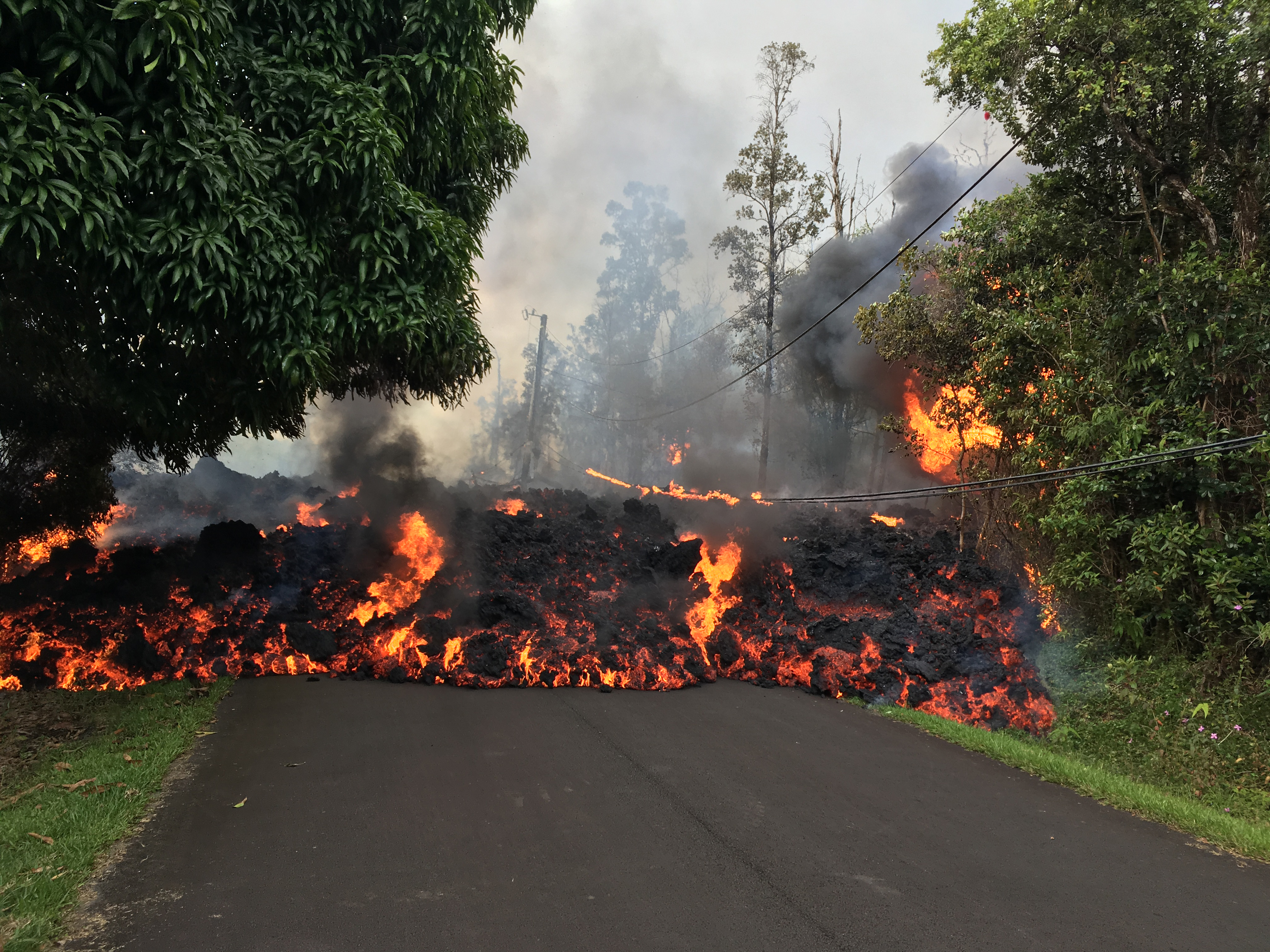
A lava flow moves on Makamae Street in Leilani Estates at 09:32 am HST (May 6, 2018)

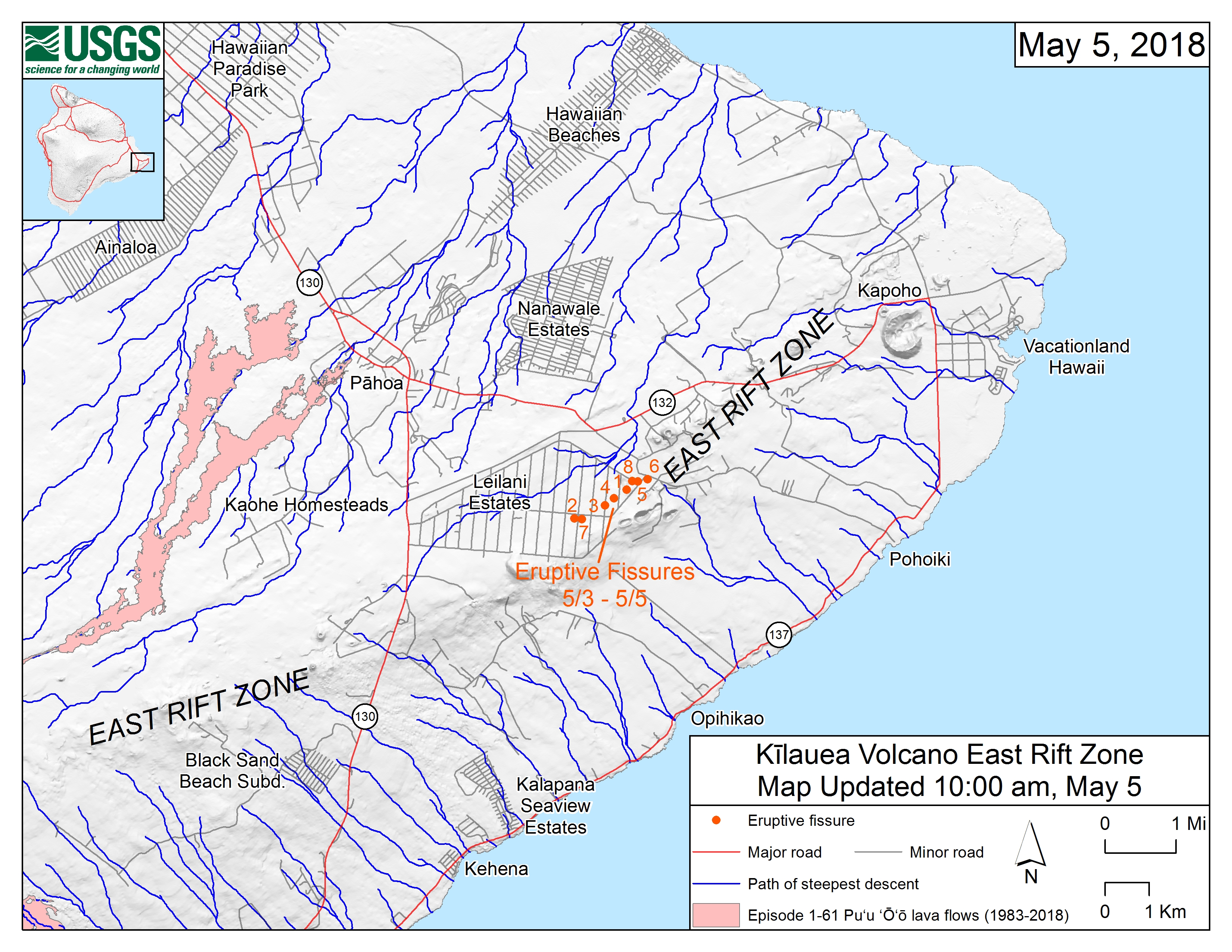
Map of the locations of eruptive fissures (May 5, 2018)

=== New eastern fissures, lava flows reach sea ===
On May 12, a 16th fissure opened in Lower Puna, which spattered lava in an area east of Puna Geothermal Venture.

A 17th fissure opened east of the 16th fissure later that day. As of May 14, 2018, lava flows from fissure 17 had traveled just under a mile from the vent, destroying an additional structure and leading officials to advise residents in an area known as Four Corners to evacuate due to the possibility that lava from a future fissure could cut Highway 132 and eventually Highway 137 as well. A spokeswoman for the mayor also reported that the chemistry of the lava was changing in later fissures, containing a mixture of more viscous old lava and faster-moving new magma. Fissure 17 was unusual in that it erupted Kīlauea's first documented andesitic lava, a composition that is higher in silica and more viscous than the basalt that Kīlaeua normally produces. The higher viscosity resulted in more explosive activity than at other fissures.

By May 16, there were 20 fissures. That day the ash plume from the summit reached 12,000 feet. On May 17, an eruption from the summit sent an ash cloud 30,000 feet high. A 21st fissure opened and several magnitude 3 earthquakes damaged the road near the entrance to Hawaiʻi Volcanoes National Park and some of the park buildings. On May 17, at approximately 4:15 a.m., an explosive eruption occurred at Halemaʻumaʻu, creating a plume of ash 30,000 feet into the air. On May 19 some of the fissures had merged into a line of fountaining lava, with a lava flow that split into separate lobes. At least two of these flows crossed through parts of Malama Kī Forest Reserve, blocked Highway 137, and flowed into the Pacific Ocean at Malama flats near MacKenzie State Recreation Area on May 19, producing clouds of irritating "laze" (lava haze), made up of steam, hydrochloric acid, and volcanic glass particles produced by littoral explosions. Warnings regarding the hazard were issued for communities downwind of the lava's ocean entry points.

By May 22, splashes from fissure 22's lava cone had engulfed the former Hawaiʻi Geothermal Project site adjacent to the PGV and was reported to be threatening the grounds of the PGV proper from the south until activity at fissure 22 slowed.

May 19 Fissure 20 Lava flow as seen by USGS from a helicopter

Spattering and lava flow at fissure 20 in Kīlauea Volcano's Lower East Rift Zone

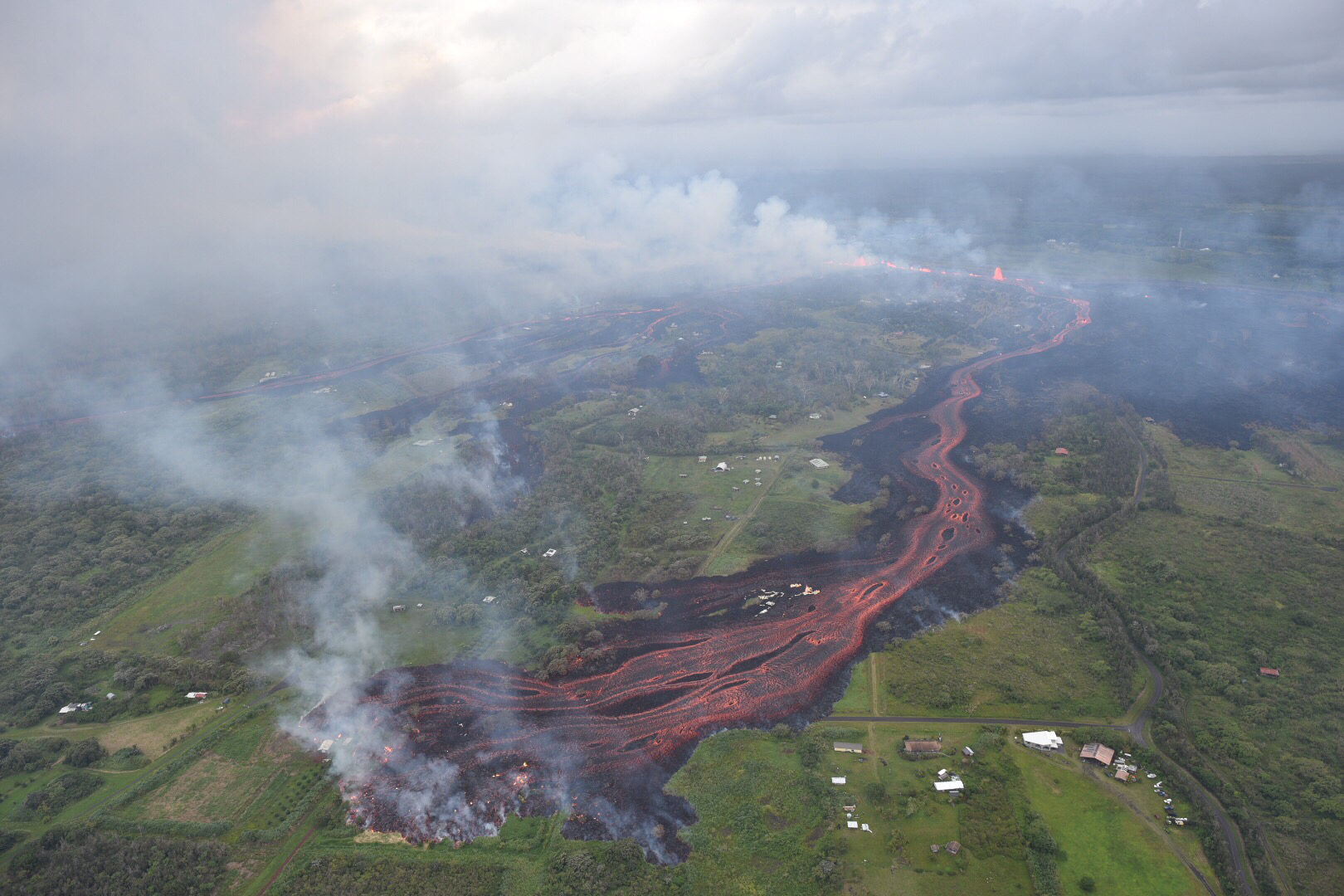
Lava emerges from the elongated fissure 16–20

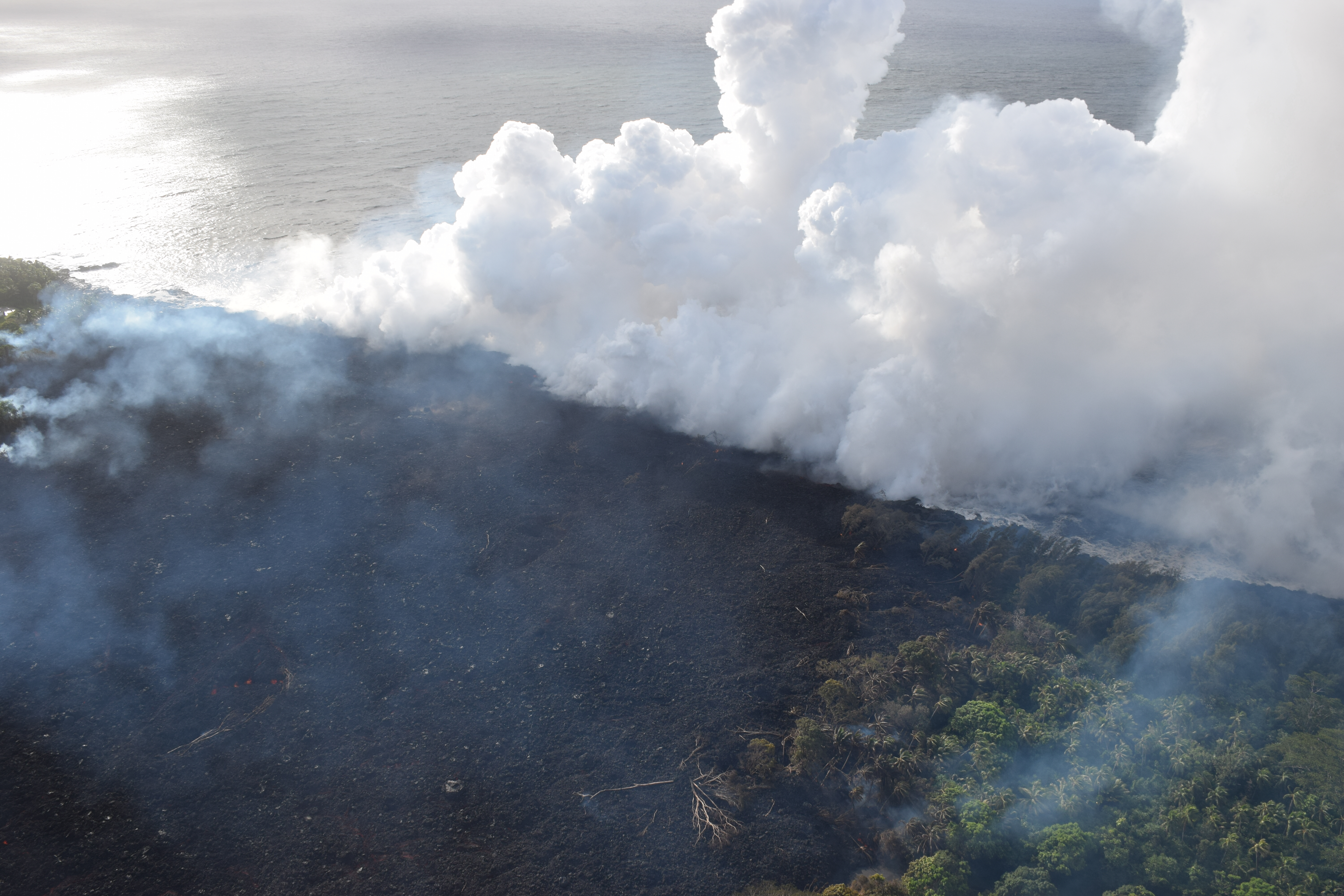
Lava from the Fissure 20 complex is entering the ocean in two locations

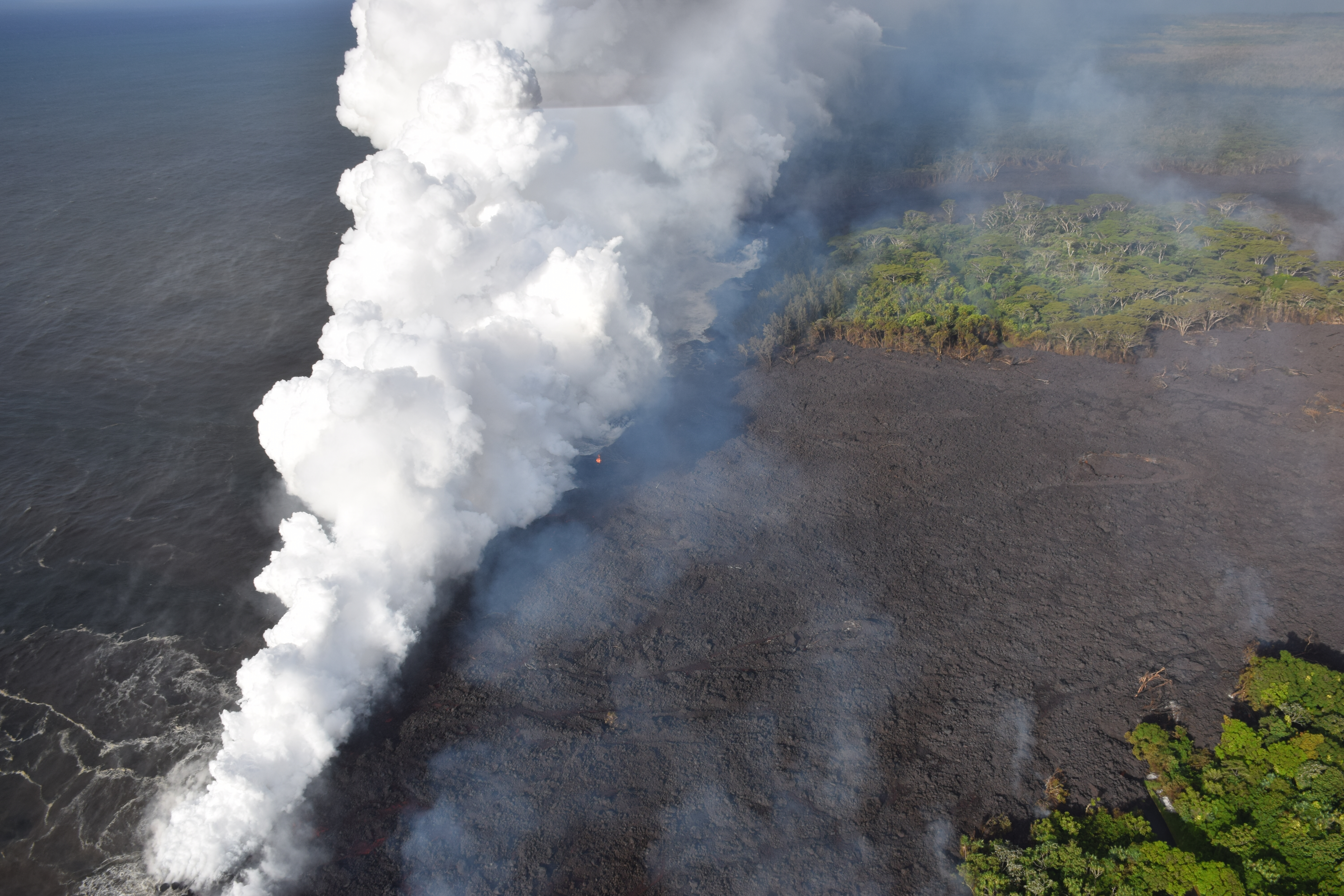
Hot lava entering the ocean creates a dense white plume

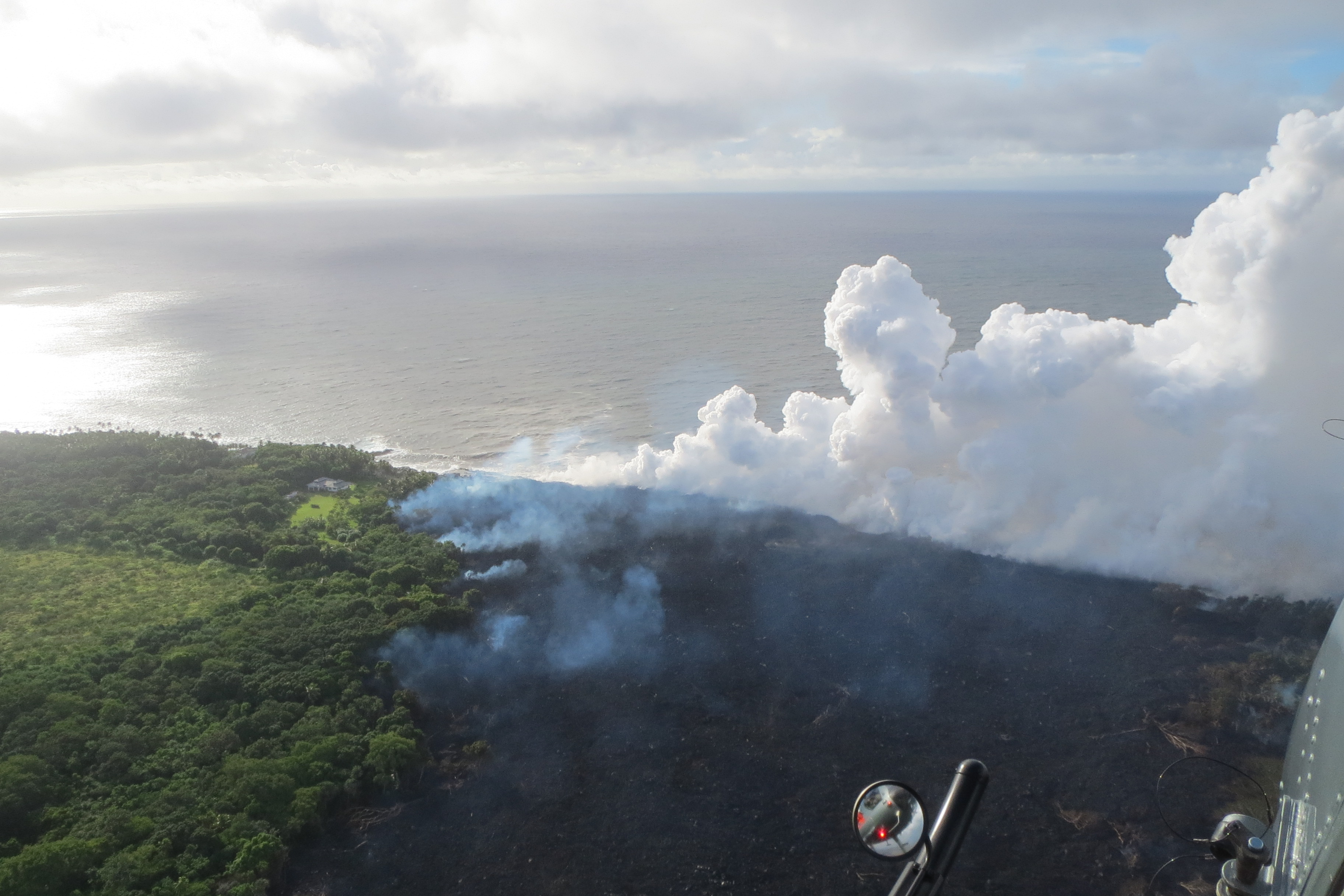
Ocean entry and wildfires

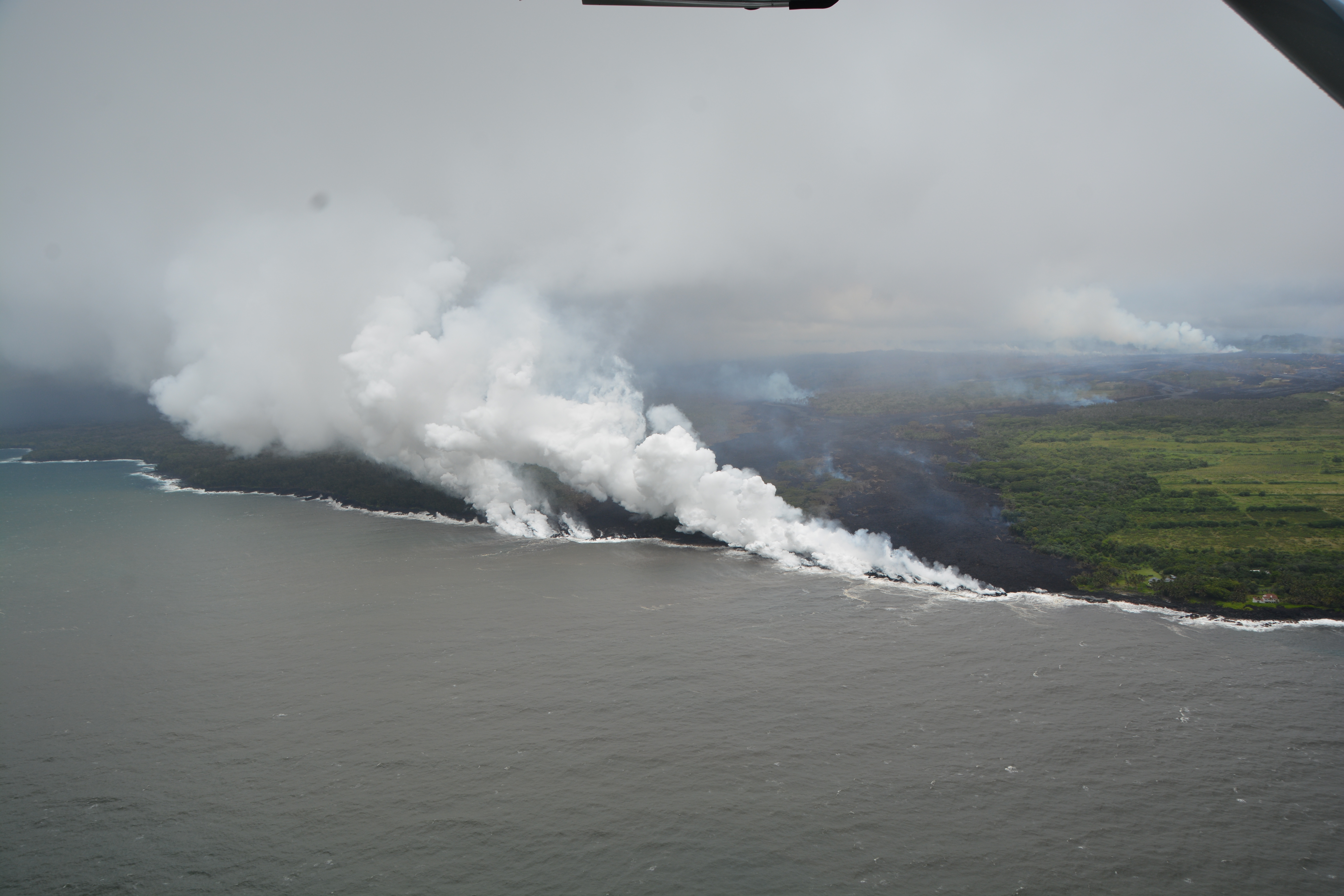
Coastal area

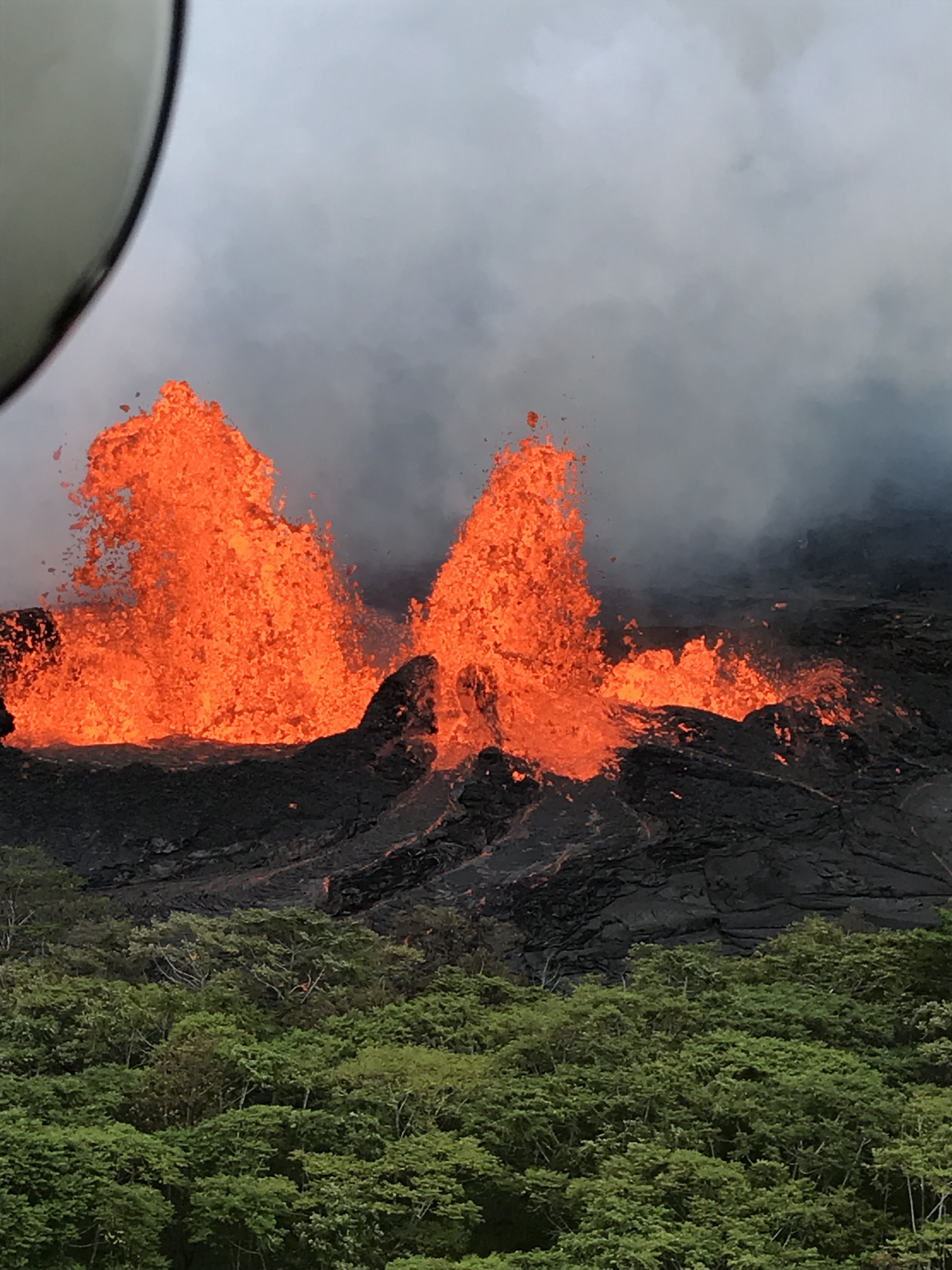
Lava fountains at fissure 22

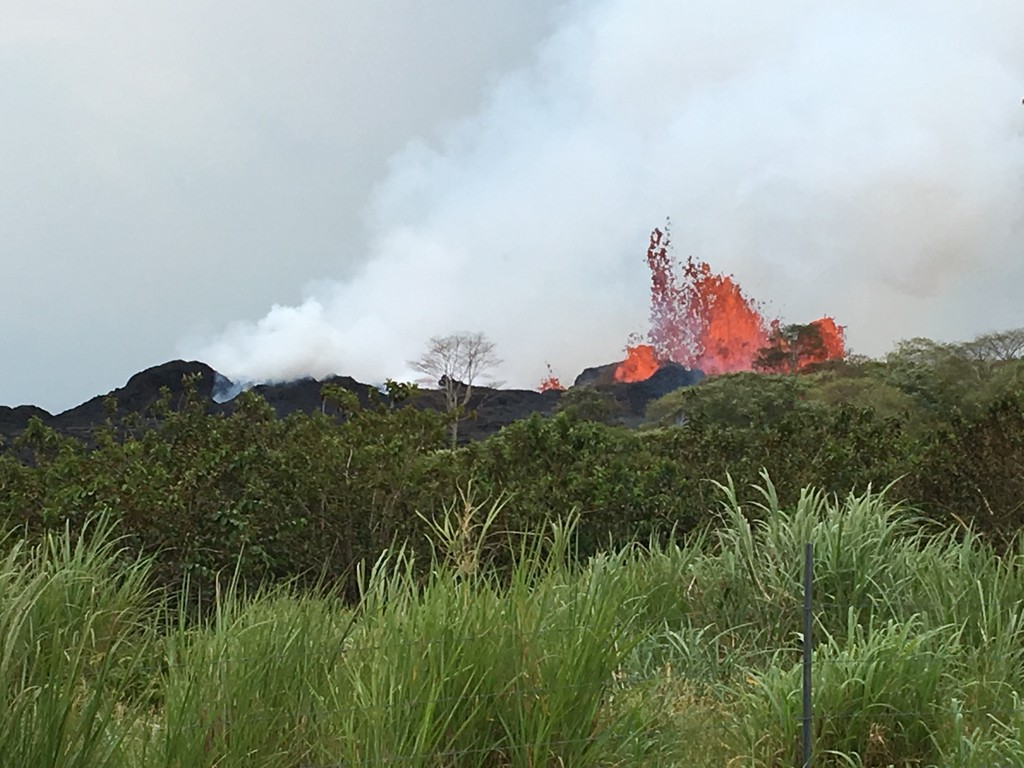
Lava fountain at fissure 22, from the north side of the fissure complex

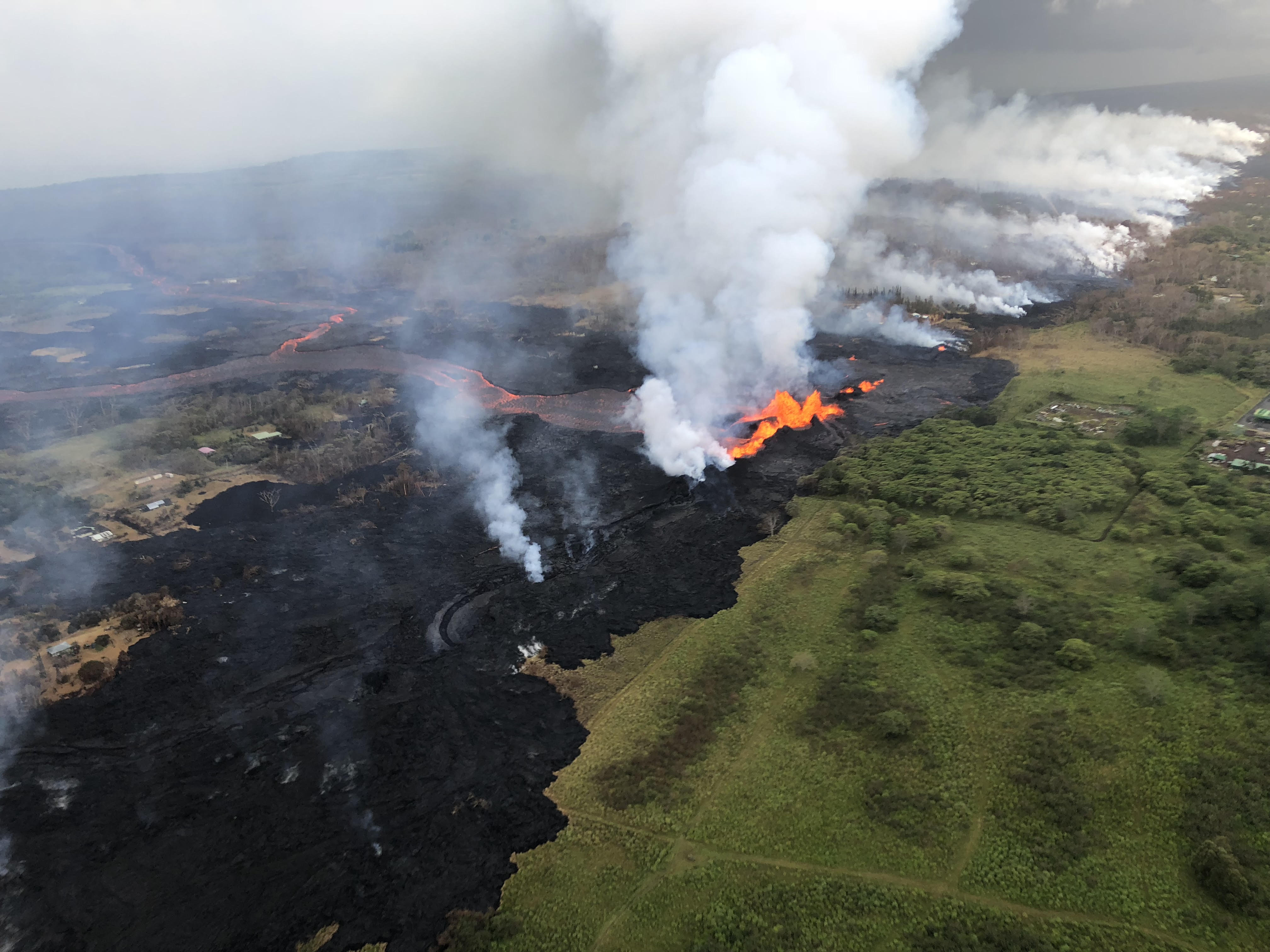
Lava channels flowing southward from the fissure

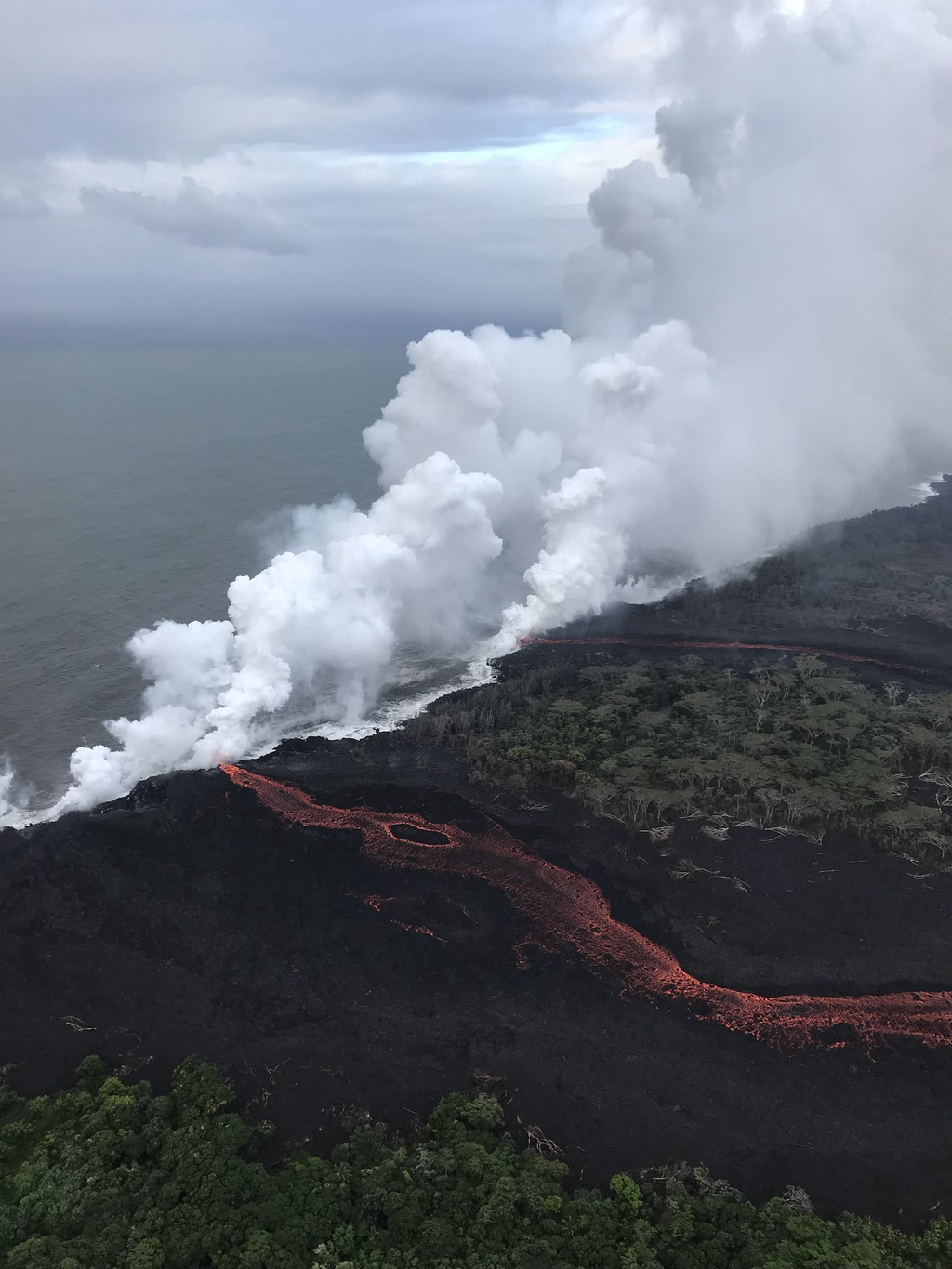
Lava enters the sea at two locations after crossing Hawaii Route 137

Animation of fissures and lava flows from May 12 to August 14

=== Reopening of Leilani Estates fissures and new northeastern lava flow ===
From May 23, eruptions at the eastern fissures began to weaken considerably, as lava activity moved back up the rift zone; older fissures reopened to release fluid pāhoehoe, which rapidly replaced the output of ʻaʻā, and led to massive pooling of lava over lower Leilani Estates. On the same day, fissures 5, 13, and 15 began to form lava fountains around the Leilani Avenue-Kahukai Street intersection. Fissures 3, 7, 8, 9, 21 and 23 farther up the rift zone would experience intermittent but lively activity between May 24 to May 27 as the center of activity moved to fissure 7. A 24th fissure would also form farther up the fissure complex on May 27, between fissures 8 and 9. Due to continued encroachment by lava, the number of destroyed structures was revised upward to 82 on May 25. The area of land covered by the 2018 lava on May 25, 2018, reached 2,223 acres. The eastern fissures would experience limited resurgences in activity into June and July.

The pool of lava in Leilani Estates eventually spilled eastwards into two paths, one short-lived route running southeast parallel to lava channels headed for the ocean, and another travelling northeast, crossing Pohoiki Road over the western boundaries of the Puna Geothermal Venture. On May 27, one of the 11 geothermal wells at the PGV was covered by the advancing lava flow from the Leilani Estates fissures, the first time lava had covered a geothermal well, followed by a second well hours later, along with ten more structures in the adjacent Leilani Estates.

As the lava flow from Leilani Estates intensified by the end of May, activity shifted to ʻAhuʻailāʻau (initially designated Fissure 8) as nearly all surrounding fissures ceased to release lava. ʻAhuʻailāʻau's lava fountains rapidly formed a new spatter cone, increasing the volume of pooling lava over the course of the week and feeding the northeastern flow further. By May 29, the northeastern flow approached Hawaii Route 132, which linked Pāhoa and Kapoho, blocking the access road to the PGV and forcing the closure of Route 132 between the Lava Tree State Park from the west and the Four Corners intersection to the east. The lava flow covered a section of the highway later that day, before travelling farther east in the direction of Kapoho. The northeastern lava flow also cut power to Kapoho and nearby developments including Vacationland Hawaiʻi, and surviving sections of Leilani Estates and Lanipuna Gardens. It was not known how and when power to those communities could be restored.

By the morning of June 3, the lava flow from ʻAhuʻailāʻau had reached Kapoho and Vacationland Hawaiʻi, where it then destroyed hundreds of houses as it buried most of the town within a day. Lava also entered the Puʻu Kapoho crater and evaporated the 400-year old Green Lake inside the crater, the largest natural freshwater lake in Hawaiʻi. The flow entered the ocean at Kapoho Bay at about 10:30 PM HST that evening, creating plumes of laze, and began to fill the bay, building a lava delta that reached about 700 yards into the water by late afternoon on June 4. By June 5, the lava had completely filled the bay, and preliminary reports from Hawaiʻi County officials indicated that hundreds of homes had been destroyed.

In addition to the draining of Puʻu ʻŌʻō, the protracted release of lava along the Lower East Rift Zone has also led to significant drainage of lava away from Halemaʻumaʻu at Kīlauea, resulting in large scale inward slumping and collapse around the crater and regular earthquakes since May 17, similar in pattern to the crater's slumping during the 1924 event. Explosions or mild earthquakes of similar magnitude became an almost daily cyclical occurrence at the summit, and have also been reported to influence the intensity of lava surges at ʻAhuʻailāʻau.

=== Transition to steady lava effusion, and eventual end ===
By the middle of June 2018, lava eruption from the source in Leilani Estates reached a consistently vigorous rate, flowing in the direction of Kapoho Bay and forming a widening coastal lava field. By July 3, fissure 8's constant lava splatter created a cone that peaked at 180 feet (50 m) high. A total of 5,914 acres were reported by Hawaii Civil Defense to have been covered by lava, with 533 homes confirmed destroyed. On June 22, the number of houses covered by lava was revised upwards by Hawaii County Civil Defense to 614. By July 1, that total had grown to 671 residences destroyed. The official toll of houses reached 700 on July 9, leaving 3 houses left standing in Kapoho. On July 13, geologists reported a tiny new island had appeared immediately offshore from the lava flow. The island was only 20 to 30 ft (6.1 to 9.1 m) across and may have formed as a submarine tumulus pushed up the outermost crust of the earth above sea level. It was connected to the mainland by an isthmus on July 16.

In mid-July, the main stream of lava from ʻAhuʻailāʻau changed course away from flowing around the northeast of Puʻu Kapoho crater following a breakout from a lava pond on July 9, redirecting to a new channel that traveled in a more direct southerly direction west of Puʻu Kapoho. The flow would cover more of the 1955 lava flow, and destroy more coastal features including Ahalanui Beach Park, its warm ponds, as well as Kua O Ka Lā Public Charter School's Lower Puna compound on July 11. By July 24, 2018, the western boundaries of the lava spill was within 200 yards (180 m) of Isaac Hale Beach Park.

As of July 21, 2018, the lava flow from ʻAhuʻailāʻau was estimated to be a steady 26,000 US gallons per second (98 m^{3}/s), according to the U.S. Geological Survey, which also stated that the most likely scenario was that lava effusion would continue at a steady rate for several months to two years. By mid-July 2018, the volume of lava had exceeded the volume deposited in the eruptions of 1955 or 1960.

Eruption activity at ʻAhuʻailāʻau began to see a downtrend beginning on August 5, 2018, as the intensity of both the lava channel and seismic activity at Halemaʻumaʻu decreased significantly over the course of the following days. Within the same time frame, the USGS reported that Puʻu ʻŌʻō was venting gases at its highest rate in more than 10 years, though no other noticeable changes had taken place at the vent. On August 15, 2018, the lower east rift zone eruption was reported to have subsided, with no new lava entering the channel from ʻAhuʻailāʻau in over a week. While scientists cautioned that the eruption could resume at any time, in that week there was no further underground volcanic inflation registering on instruments, and no further summit collapse events, with only a small amount of lava active inside ʻAhuʻailāʻau. Afterward, a small lava lake was maintained within the crater of the ʻAhuʻailāʻau cone for another 3 weeks. On September 4, the lava lake in ʻAhuʻailāʻau receded below the surface, bringing the eruption to an end.

== Impact and response ==
The Hawaii National Guard stated on May 11, 2018, that they were ready to evacuate up to 2,000 people at a moment's notice, through the use of land convoys and UH-60 Black Hawk and CH-47 Chinook helicopters. Hawaii Governor David Ige had made a request for a Presidential Disaster Declaration, which was approved that day and opened the door to federal assistance for the disaster. Starting May 23, two CH-53E Super Stallion helicopters were on standby in Hilo in case of sudden evacuation needs. The U.S. Marine Corps helicopters were in support of Joint Task Force 5–0, a military/government partnership to assist in managing the disaster. The large heavy-lift helicopters have a carrying capacity of about 50 people at once, ensuring that residents south of the lava flow can be completely evacuated in a few hours, should the last functioning road out of the area south of the lava flow be cut off by the eruption.

As the area of destruction grew significantly as a result of ʻAhuʻailāʻau's resurgence in late-May 2018, access to surviving sections of Leilani Estate within immediate proximity to the margins of the lava field began to be heavily restricted starting May 31. A proposed ban on future home construction in areas subject to high-risk of volcanic activity was also reported on July 1, 2018, to be in discussion by Hawaii politicians.

Temporary repair works were conducted for sections of Highway 11 (near Volcano Village and the entrance to Volcanoes National Park) and Highway 130 (connecting much of lower Puna to the rest of the island), which suffered cracks from seismic activities over the months, and have been subject to restricted use due to the extent of their damage. Chain of Craters Road, which has previously been partially covered by past lava flows, had also been prepared as an alternate escape route should Highway 130 be blocked by the current eruption, a measure previously taken during the 2014 Pāhoa lava flow.

In early June, a Winter Weather Advisory alert was issued for the higher areas of the island due to freezing rain and ice falling. The quantity of lava reaching the ocean created large plumes of steam which rose high enough in the atmosphere to eventually condense and freeze before falling on the summit of Mauna Kea, 45 miles (72 km) from the eruption.

Sporadic incidents of injuries and emergency rescues have been reported over the course of the eruption. The first known injury was reported on May 20, 2018: A homeowner was struck with a piece of "lava spatter" and suffered burns and a broken leg. Four people were evacuated by helicopter on May 19, after lava cut off their exit, and three people were airlifted on June 3 from the Kapoho area. On July 16, a further 23 were injured when a tour boat carrying passengers observing a lava ocean entry was pelted by lava rocks thrown by an intense hydrovolcanic explosion, including a large lava rock that pierced through the boat's roof. Thirteen were treated at the hospital, including three who were admitted with unspecified injuries and one in serious condition with a broken thigh bone.

Hawaii County's Voluntary Housing Program provides buyouts based on land values before the disaster to home and property owners. Hundreds of people in the impacted areas applied for the program.

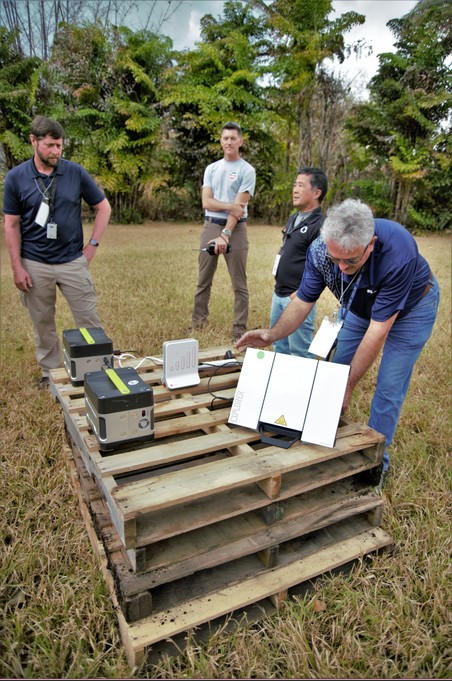
FEMA team sets up a mobile air quality monitoring station

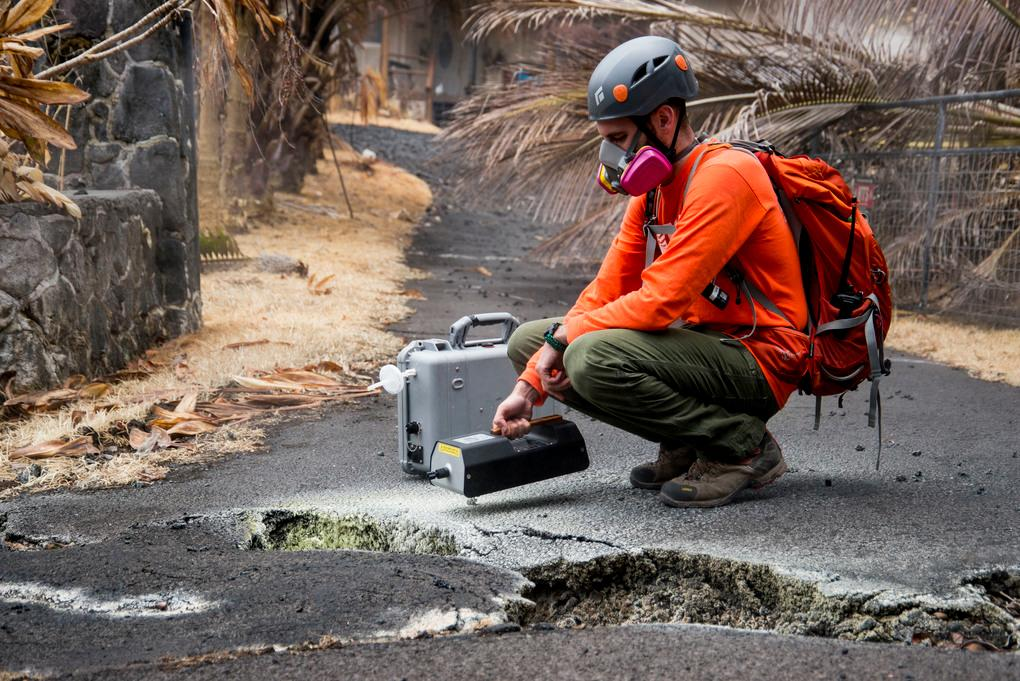
US Geological Survey volunteer tests for sulfur dioxide

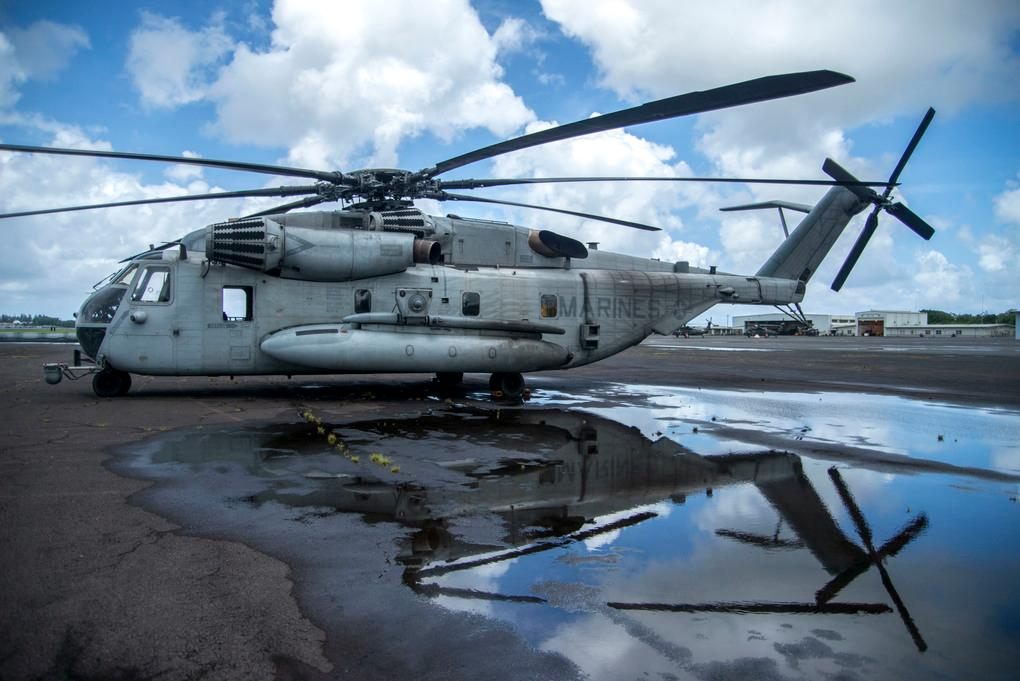
Marine Super Stallion standing by in event of evacuation
