= Lake Waiau =

Lake in Hawaii, United States

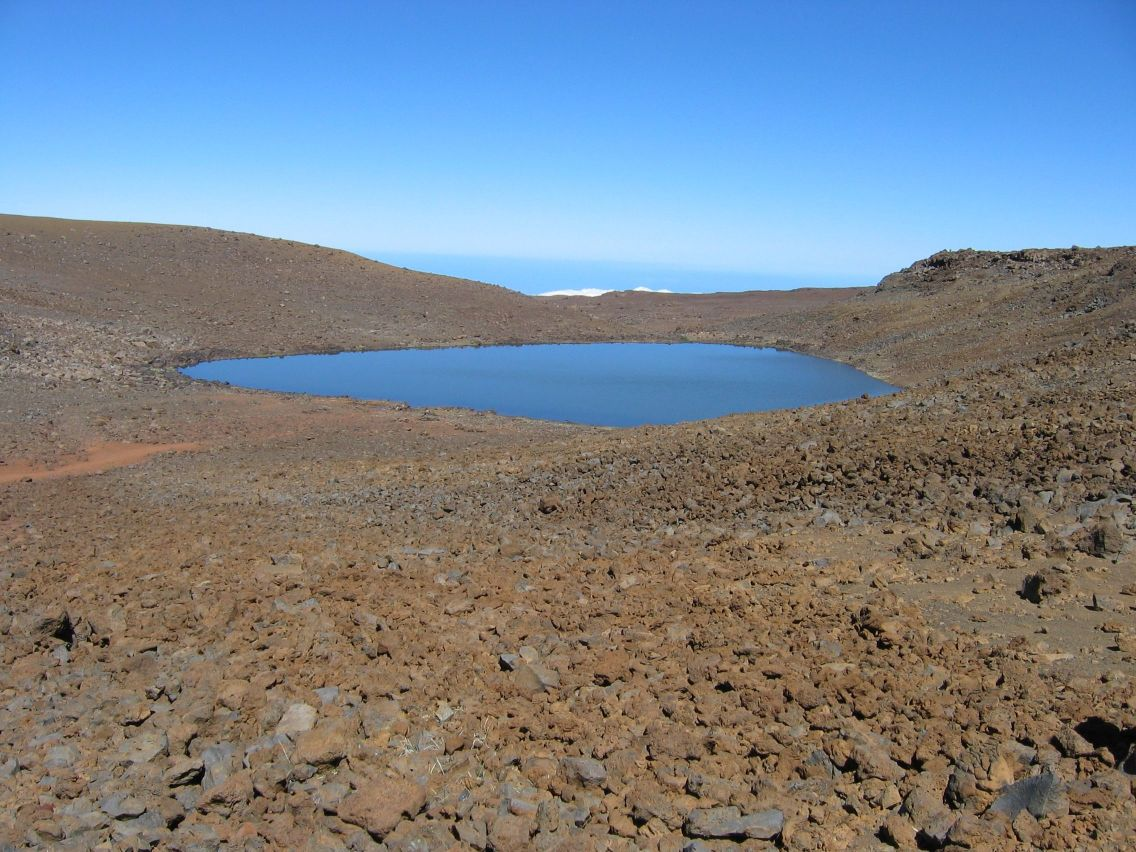

- Location within Hawaii Location within Pacific Ocean
- Location: Mauna Kea, Hawaii
- Coordinates: 19°48′41″N 155°28′39″W
- Catchment area: 13.5 ha (33 acres)
- Basin countries: United States
- Max. width: 100 m (330 ft)
- Surface area: 6,000 m^{2} (65,000 sq ft)
- Max. depth: 2–2.5 m (6.6–8.2 ft)
- Surface elevation: 3,970 m (13,020 ft)

Lake Waiau is a high-elevation lake located at 3,970 m (13,020 ft) above sea level on Mauna Kea, on the island of Hawaiʻi. It is one of the highest lakes in the United States. After the evaporation of Ka Wai o Pele in 2018 and the short-lived lake in Halemaʻumaʻu crater in 2020, Lake Waiau is the only lake on Hawaiʻi Island and one of very few lakes at all in the state of Hawaiʻi. It is relatively small, only about 100 m across, and varies in size as the water level rises and falls. At high water levels a small outlet stream appears at the northwest end, but it is absorbed into the ground after a short distance. The name means "swirling water" in Hawaiian, though it is usually rather placid. It usually freezes in winter, but aquatic insects such as midges and beetles can be found breeding in the water.

== Description ==
Lake Waiau is located inside the Pu'u Waiau cinder cone at an altitude of 3970 m. It is approximately heart shaped and its diameter reaches about 100 m. The average surface area of the lake is around 6,000 m^{2} (65,000 ft^{2}; 0.60 ha; 1.5 acres). The size of its surface area fluctuates significantly over the year. It reaches its peak during spring with a maximal depth between 2 m and 2.5 m. By the end of the summer, it often has shrunk to one third of its original size with a maximal depth below 1 m. A spillover into the Pohakuloa Gulch occurs when the lake depth is more than 2.3 m. The lake is only fed by precipitation, which occurs primarily during the winter; its catchment area is about 135,000 m^{2} (1,450,000 ft^{2}; 13.5 ha; 33 acres), mostly located within the Pu'u Waiau cinder cone.

The lake is an anomaly in the peak region of Mauna Kea as everywhere else the ground is unable to retain water. The exact nature of the impermeable ground layer of the lake is still unknown. It is assumed that fine-grained densely compressed ash, basalt rock or a small permafrost layer may play a role. No permafrost layer has been established so far for the lake area itself, but it was found at another location in the peak area. The bottom of the lake, however, is known to have a 7.5-metre (25 ft) thick sediment layer.

== Temporary shrinkage 2010-2014 ==
Between 2010 and 2013 the lake shrank significantly. On 26 September 2013, the lake had been reduced to a mere puddle of less than 2% of its original surface size, with a reported width of 9 m (10 yd) and maximum depth of 23 cm (9 in). By December 2013, three months later, the maximum depth had dropped further to 13 cm (5 in).

The exact causes for the water loss are unknown. The suspects are drought conditions and the thawing of an assumed permafrost layer under the lake leading to increased seepage.

After the particularly wet winter of 2013/2014, however, the lake was back to around 75% of its original size by May 2014, and subsequently returned to its normal size. The drought conditions on Mauna Kea from 2010 to 2013 are currently believed to have been the primary reason for the water loss.

== Mythology ==
The lake is of some importance in Hawaiian mythology. Aside from Poliʻahu, there are two additional snow deities, Lilinoe and Waiau, who are associated with Mauna Kea, and according to Westervelt, the lake was probably named after the goddess of the same, who used to bathe in it. Originally Hawaiians considered the whole peak region of Mauna Kea, including Lake Waiau, a sacred site, and only priests and chieftains were allowed to access it. Later, after the formation of the Hawaiian kingdom, the peak region was occasionally visited by members of the royal family. The last one to do so was Queen Emma in 1881, who also took a bath in the lake during her visit.

== Gallery ==
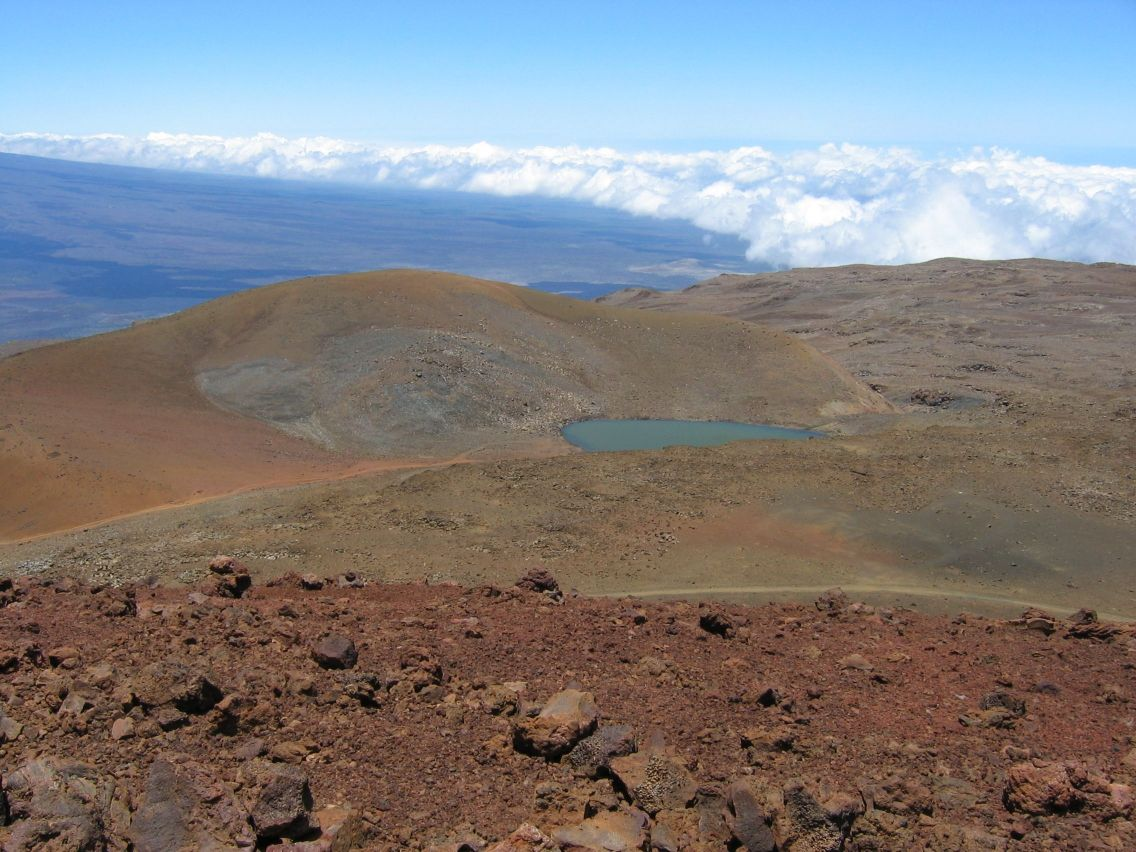
view from above

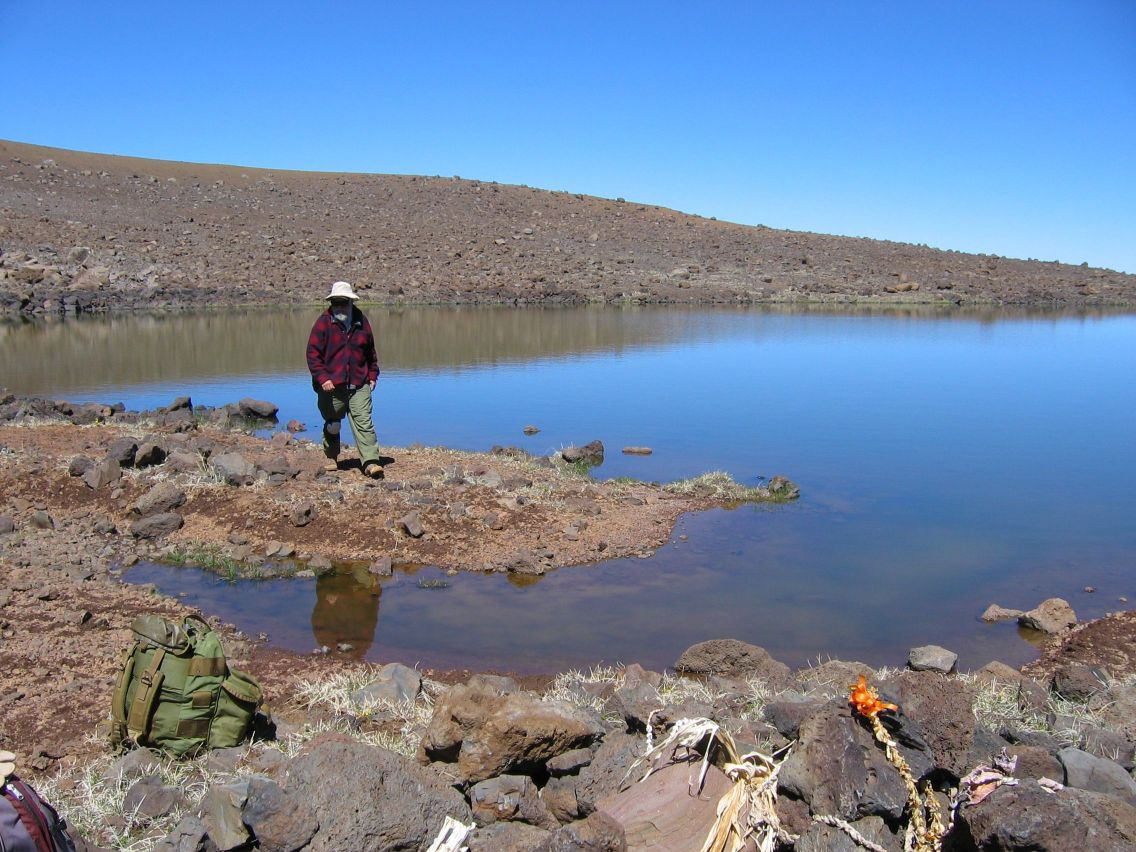
with a person for scale

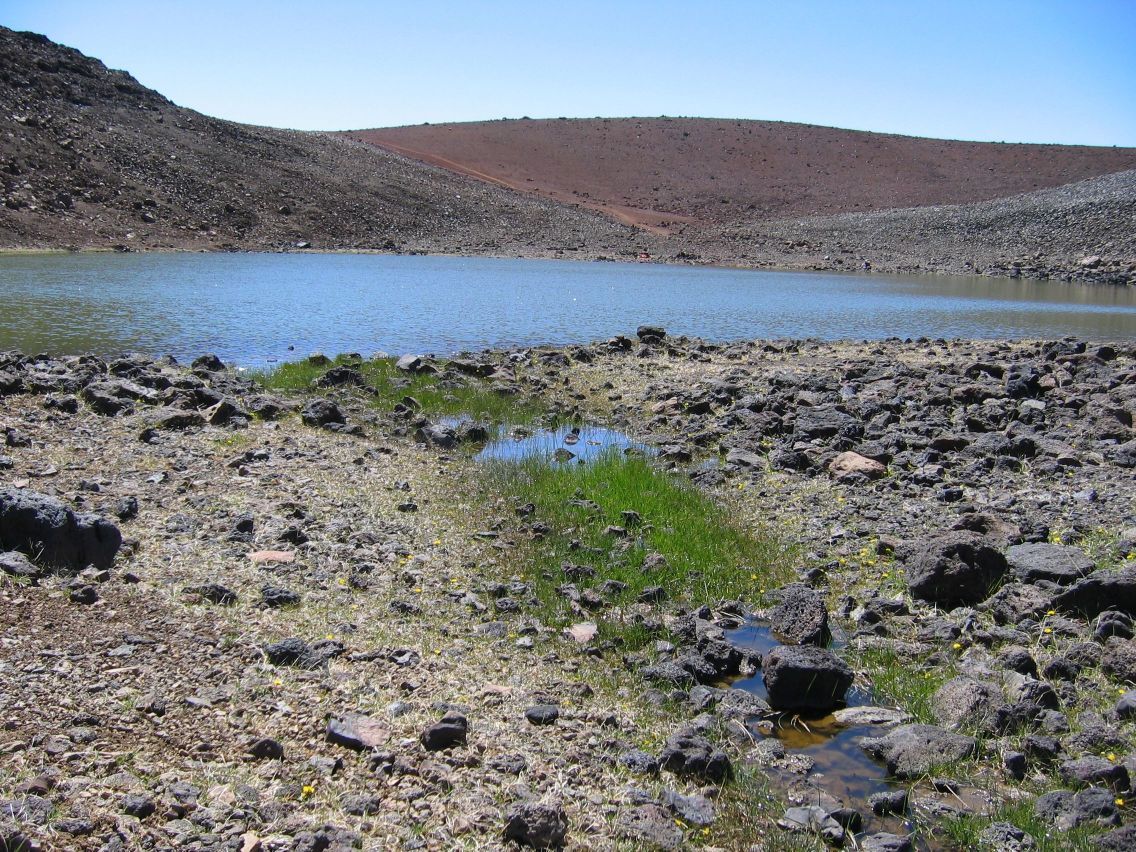
outlet stream

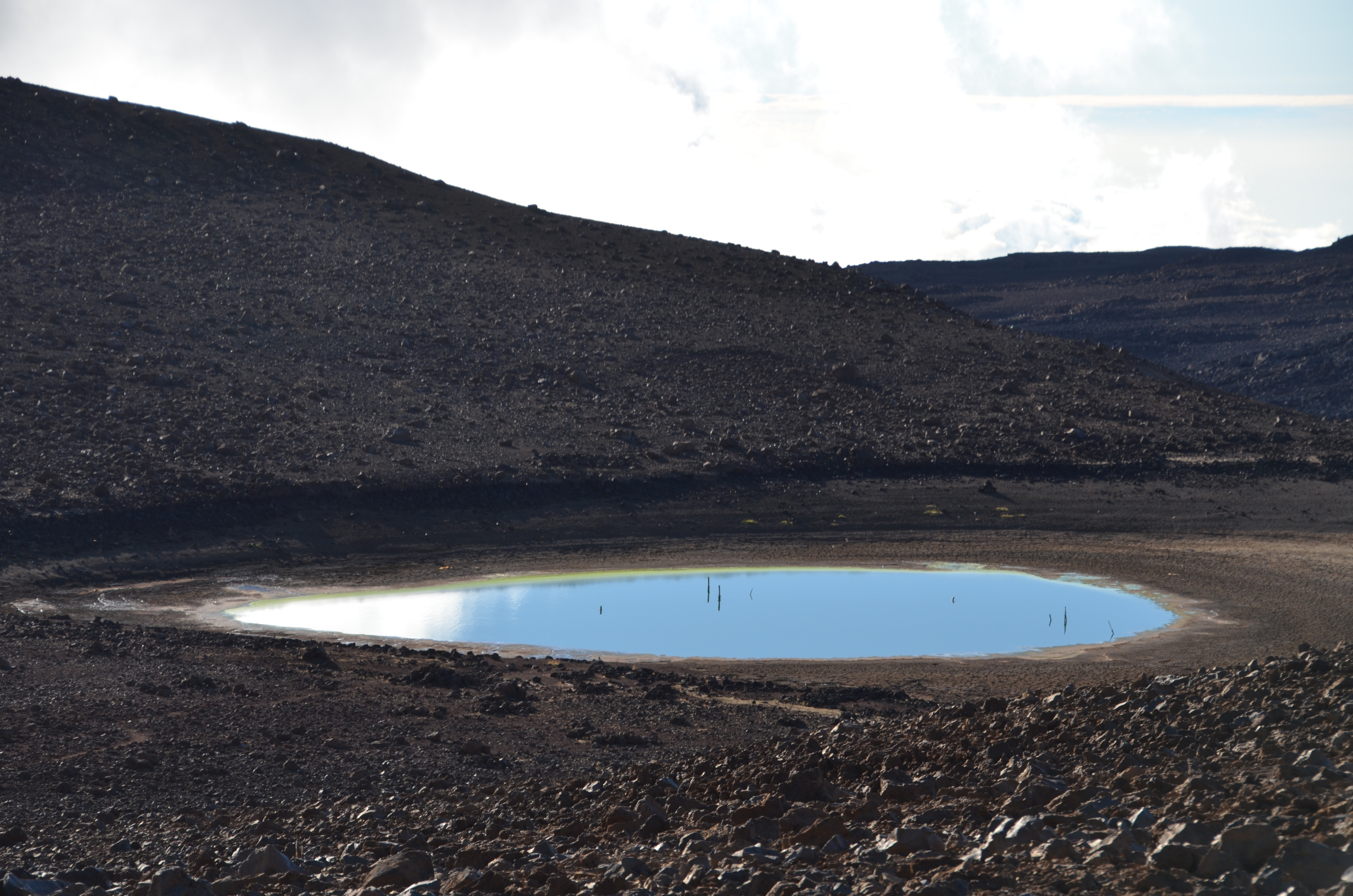
Shrinkage October 2012

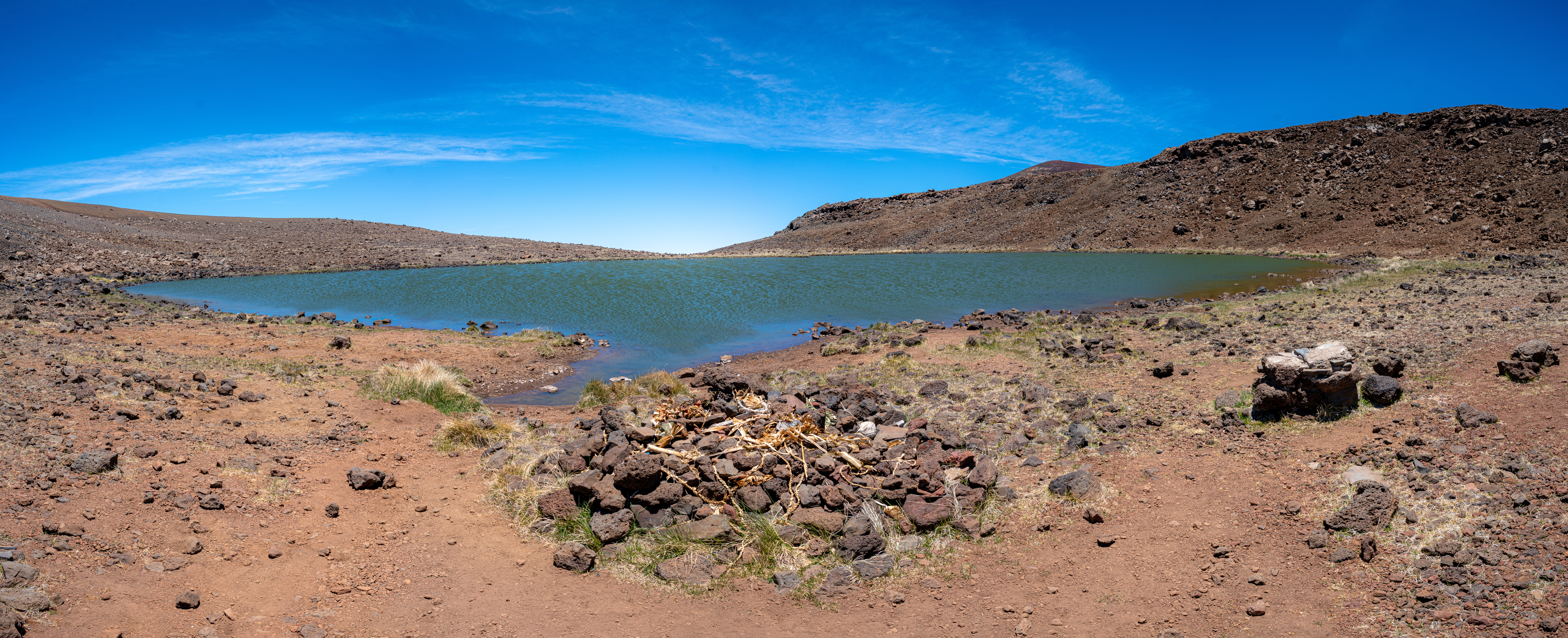
May 26, 2019

== See also ==
- List of lakes in Hawaii

== Bibliography ==
- Jane Ellen Massey: Lake Waiau: A Study of a Tropical Alpine Lake, Past and Present. University of Hawaii Press, 1978
- Alfred H. Woodcock, Meyer Rubin, R. A. Duce: Deep Layer of Sediments in Alpine Lake in the Tropical Mid-Pacific. Science, New Series, Vol. 154, No. 3749 (Nov. 4, 1966), pp. 647–648 (JSTOR)
