= List of Nysius species =

This is a list of 101 species in the genus Nysius, the false chinch bugs:

Nysius aa Polhemus, 1998
Nysius abnormis Usinger, 1942
Nysius albipennis Distant, 1913
Nysius angustatus Uhler, 1872
Nysius angustellus (Blanchard, 1852)
Nysius atlantidum Horvath, 1890
Nysius baeckstroemi Bergroth, 1923
Nysius beardsleyi Ashlock, 1966
Nysius blackburni White, 1881
Nysius caledoniae Distant, 1920
Nysius cargadosensis Distant, 1909
Nysius ceylanicus (Motschulsky, 1863)
Nysius chenopodii Usinger, 1942
Nysius coenosulus Stal, 1859
Nysius communis Usinger, 1942
Nysius contiguus Walker, 1872
Nysius convexus (Usinger, 1942)
Nysius cymoides (Spinola, 1837)
Nysius dallasi White, 1878
Nysius delectulus Perkins, 1912
Nysius delectus White, 1878
Nysius dohertyi Distant, 1904
Nysius ephippiatus (Spinola, 1852)
Nysius ericae (Schilling, 1829)
Nysius erythynus Fernando, 1960
Nysius euphorbiae Horvath, 1910
Nysius eximius Stal, 1858
Nysius expressus Distant, 1883
Nysius femoratus Van Duzee, 1940
Nysius feuerborni China, 1935
Nysius frigatensis Usinger, 1942
Nysius fucatus Usinger, 1942
Nysius fullawayi Usinger, 1942
Nysius fuscovittatus Barber, 1958
Nysius gloriae Baena & Garcia, 1999
Nysius graminicola (Kolenati, 1845)
Nysius grandis Baker, 1906
Nysius groenlandicus (Zetterstedt, 1840)
Nysius haeckeli (Leon *, 1890)
Nysius hardyi Ashlock, 1966
Nysius helveticus (Herrich-Schaeffer, 1850)
Nysius hidakai Nakatani, 2015
Nysius huttoni White, 1878 (wheat bug)
Nysius immunis (Walker, 1872)
Nysius inconspicuus Distant, 1904
Nysius insoletus Barber, 1947
Nysius irroratus (Spinola, 1852)
Nysius kinbergi Usinger, 1959
Nysius lacustrinus Distant, 1909
Nysius lichenicola Kirkaldy, 1910
Nysius liliputanus Eyles & Ashlock, 1969
Nysius longicollis Blackburn, 1889
Nysius melanicus Distant, 1909
Nysius minor Distant, 1909
Nysius mixtus Usinger, 1942
Nysius monticola Distant, 1893
Nysius neckerensis Usinger, 1942
Nysius nemorivagus White, 1881
Nysius niger Baker, 1906 (northern false chinch bug)
Nysius nigricornis Kerzhner, 1979
Nysius nihoae Usinger, 1942
Nysius nubilus Dallas, 1852
Nysius oceanicus Usinger, 1937
Nysius orarius Malipatil, 2005
Nysius pallipennis Walker, 1872
Nysius palor Ashlock, 1963
Nysius paludicola Barber, 1949
Nysius picipes Usinger, 1937
Nysius pilosulus Horvath, 1904
Nysius plebeius Distant, 1883
Nysius procerus Distant, 1893
Nysius puberulus Berg, 1895
Nysius pulchellus Stal, 1859
Nysius punctipes Stal, 1856
Nysius raphanus Howard, 1872 (false chinch bug)
Nysius rhyparus Stal, 1859
Nysius rubescens White, 1881
Nysius salti Usinger, 1952
Nysius sanctaehelenae White, 1877
Nysius scutellatus Dallas, 1852
Nysius senecionis (Schilling, 1829)
Nysius simulans Stal, 1859
Nysius spectabilis Distant, 1901
Nysius steeleae China, 1934
Nysius subcinctus Walker, 1872
Nysius sublittoralis Perkins, 1912
Nysius suffusus Usinger, 1942
Nysius tasmaniensis Malipatil, 2005
Nysius tenellus Barber, 1947
Nysius terrestris Usinger, 1942
Nysius thymi (Wolff, 1804)
Nysius transcaspicus Wagner, 1958
Nysius usitatus Ashlock, 1972
Nysius vinitor Bergroth, 1891 (Rutherglen bug)
Nysius vulcanorum Lindberg, 1958
Nysius wekiuicola Ashlock & Gagne, 1983
† Nysius stratus Scudder, 1890
† Nysius terrae Scudder, 1890
† Nysius tritus Scudder, 1890
† Nysius vecula Scudder, 1890
† Nysius vinctus Scudder, 1890
