= Agrotis kuamauna =

Conservation status
- Endangered (IUCN 3.1)

Scientific classification
- Kingdom: Animalia
- Phylum: Arthropoda
- Class: Insecta
- Order: Lepidoptera
- Superfamily: Noctuoidea
- Family: Noctuidae
- Genus: Agrotis
- Species: A. kuamauna

Binomial name
- Agrotis kuamauna Medeiros & Kirkpatrick, 2019

Species of moth

Agrotis kuamauna is a species of owlet moth endemic to the alpine high elevations of Mauna Kea on the big island of Hawai'i.

== Description ==
Agrotis kuamauna adults have forewing lengths ranging from 31–40 mm (1.2–1.6 in). Forewings are brown with small darker splotches. The abdomen is brown with tufts of scales. A. kuamauna can be distinguished from the related moth A. helela with which it shares its habitat by its overall larger size and paler coloration.

== Distribution and habitat ==
Agrotis kuamauna is endemic to the harsh high elevation alpine zones near the summit of Mauna Kea, occupying elevations from 3,000 m (9,800 ft) up to the summit, at approximately 4,200 m (13,800 ft). Larvae are found associated with volcanic ash substrates within this habitat, as opposed to the more rocky cinders preferred by some other summit insects such as the Wekiu bug.

== Ecology ==
Agrotis kuamauna is a diurnal species. Its larvae are omnivorous, feeding on other insects as well as plant material blown up to the alpine habitat in which they live, which is otherwise nearly devoid of plant life. Larvae from Mauna Kea that were possibly A. kuamauna were found to be able to resist temperatures below −6 °C (21 °F) for at least 24 hours, which is consistent with the below freezing temperatures encountered at nighttime in the summit zone.

== Etymology ==
The species name kuamauna is a Hawaiian word meaning "mountaintop", in reference to A. kuamauna residing at the highest elevations of Mauna Kea.
