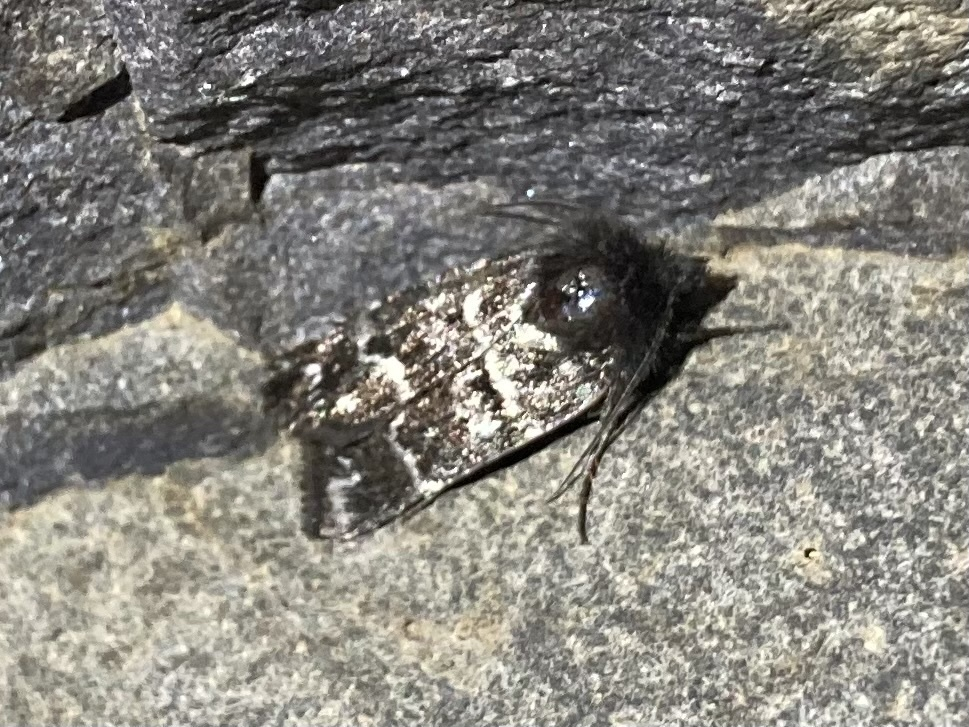

Conservation status
- Endangered (IUCN 3.1)

Scientific classification
- Kingdom: Animalia
- Phylum: Arthropoda
- Class: Insecta
- Order: Lepidoptera
- Superfamily: Noctuoidea
- Family: Noctuidae
- Genus: Agrotis
- Species: A. helela

Binomial name
- Agrotis helela Medeiros, 2019

= Agrotis helela =

Species of moth

Agrotis helela is a species of owlet moth endemic to the alpine high elevations of Mauna Kea and Mauna Loa on the big island of Hawai'i.

== Description ==
Agrotis helela adults are smaller than most other Agrotis, with wing lengths ranging from 20–25mm. The forewing is dark with lighter bands perpendicular to the long axis of the wing, with . The thorax and abdomen are dark gray. Little is currently known regarding the larval and pupal stages for this species. On Mauna Kea, A. helela can be distinguished from the similar A. kuamauna with which its shares its habitat by the former's smaller size and darker coloration.

== Distribution and habitat ==
Agrotis helela is endemic to the harsh high elevation alpine and subalpine zones on the peaks of Mauna Kea and Mauna Loa, occupying elevations from 2900m up to the summits (~4200m).

== Ecology ==
Agrotis helela is a diurnal species and is active on sunny days. It is hypothesized to contribute to pollination of the endemic Mauna Kea silversword.

== Etymology ==
The species name helela is derived from the Hawaiian phrase hele lā, meaning to travel by day, in reference to A. helela being a diurnal species.
