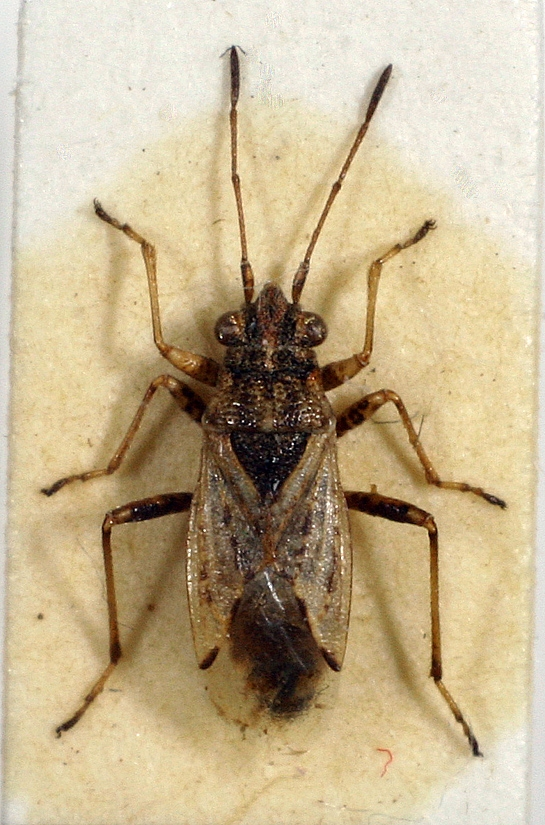
- Nysius ericae

Scientific classification
- Kingdom: Animalia
- Phylum: Arthropoda
- Class: Insecta
- Order: Hemiptera
- Suborder: Heteroptera
- Family: Lygaeidae
- Tribe: Nysiini
- Genus: Nysius; Dallas, 1852

Diversity
- at least 100 species

= Nysius =

Genus of true bugs

Nysius is a genus of false chinch bugs in the family Lygaeidae. At least 100 described species are placed in Nysius.

Like other seed bugs, some species in the genus have proven to be crop pests of wheat and other grains (including N. huttoni), as well as many vegetables. A unique Hawaiian radiation of the genus contains almost a quarter of the world's species (26), as well as the most diverse character set seen in the genus. In addition, two closely related species (colloquially known as wēkiu bugs) found on Mauna Loa and Mauna Kea on the island of Hawai'i, are different from the rest of Nysius by exhibiting reduced nonfunctional wings, and feed on dead and dying insects (N. wekiuicola, N. aa).

== Species ==
The genus contains the following species:

- Nysius aa Polhemus, 1998
- Nysius abnormis Usinger, 1942
- Nysius albipennis Distant, W.L., 1913
- Nysius angustatus Uhler, 1872
- Nysius angustellus (Blanchard, 1852)
- Nysius atlantidum Horváth, 1890
- Nysius baeckstroemi Bergroth, 1924
- Nysius beardsleyi Ashlock, 1966
- Nysius blackburni White, 1881
- Nysius caledoniae Distant, 1920
- Nysius cargadosensis Distant, W.L., 1909
- Nysius ceylanicus (Motschulsky, 1863)
- Nysius chenopodii Usinger, 1942
- Nysius coenosulus Stål, 1859
- Nysius communis Usinger, 1942
- Nysius contiguus Walker, 1872
- Nysius convexus (Usinger, 1942)
- Nysius cymoides (Spinola, 1837)
- Nysius dallasi White, 1878
- Nysius delectulus Perkins, 1912
- Nysius delectus White, 1878
- Nysius dohertyi Distant, W.L., 1904
- Nysius ephippiatus Spinola, 1852
- Nysius ericae (Schilling, 1829)
- Nysius erythynus Fernando, 1960
- Nysius euphorbiae Horvath, G., 1910
- Nysius eximius Stal, 1858
- Nysius expressus Distant, 1883
- Nysius femoratus Van Duzee, E.P., 1940
- Nysius feuerborni China, W.E., 1935
- Nysius frigatensis Usinger, 1942
- Nysius fucatus Usinger, 1942
- Nysius fullawayi Usinger, 1942
- Nysius fuscovittatus Barber, 1958
- Nysius gloriae Baena & García, 1999
- Nysius graminicola (Kolenati, 1845)
- Nysius grandis Baker, 1906
- Nysius groenlandicus (Zetterstedt, 1838)
- Nysius haeckeli (Leon *, 1890)
- Nysius hardyi Ashlock, 1966
- Nysius helveticus (Herrich-Schäffer, 1850)
- Nysius hidakai Nakatani, 2015
- Nysius huttoni White, F.B., 1878
- Nysius immunis (Walker, 1872)
- Nysius inconspicuus Distant, 1903
- Nysius insoletus Barber, 1947
- Nysius irroratus (Spinola, 1852)
- Nysius kinbergi Usinger, 1959
- Nysius lacustrinus Distant, 1909
- Nysius latus Wagner, 1958
- Nysius lichenicola Kirkaldy, 1910
- Nysius liliputanus Eyles & Ashlock, 1969
- Nysius longicollis Blackburn, 1888
- Nysius melanicus Distant, W.L., 1909
- Nysius minor Distant, W.L., 1909
- Nysius mixtus Usinger, 1942
- Nysius monticolus Distant, 1893
- Nysius neckerensis Usinger, 1942
- Nysius nemorivagus White, 1881
- Nysius niger Baker, 1906
- Nysius nigricornis Kerzhner, 1979
- Nysius nihoae Usinger, 1942
- Nysius nubilus Dallas, W.S., 1852
- Nysius oceanicus Usinger, R.L., 1937
- Nysius orarius Malipatil, 2005
- Nysius pacificus China, 1930
- Nysius pallipennis Walker, F., 1872
- Nysius palor Ashlock, 1963
- Nysius paludicola Barber, 1949
- Nysius paludicolus Barber, H.G., 1949
- Nysius picipes Usinger, R.L., 1937
- Nysius pilosulus Horvath, 1904
- Nysius plebejus (Distant, 1883)
- Nysius procerus Distant, 1893
- Nysius puberulus Berg, 1895
- Nysius pulchellus Stal, C., 1859
- Nysius punctipes Stal, C., 1856
- Nysius raphanus Howard, 1872
- Nysius rhyparus Stål, 1859
- Nysius rubescens White, 1881
- Nysius salti Usinger, R.L., 1952
- Nysius sanctaehelenae White, F.B., 1877
- Nysius scutellatus Dallas, 1852
- Nysius senecionis (Schilling, 1829)
- Nysius simulans Stål, 1859
- Nysius spectabilis Distant, 1901
- Nysius steeleae China, W.E., 1934
- Nysius stratus Scudder, 1890
- Nysius subcinctus Walker, F., 1872
- Nysius sublittoralis Perkins, 1912
- Nysius suffusus Usinger, 1942
- Nysius tasmaniensis Malipatil, 2005
- Nysius tenellus Barber, 1947
- Nysius terrae Scudder, 1890
- Nysius terrestris Usinger, 1942
- Nysius thymi (Wolff, 1804)
- Nysius transcaspicus Wagner, 1958
- Nysius tritus Scudder, 1890
- Nysius usitatus Ashlock, 1972
- Nysius vecula Scudder, 1890
- Nysius veculus Scudder, S.H., 1890
- Nysius vinctus Scudder, 1890
- Nysius vinitor Bergroth, 1891
- Nysius vulcanorum Lindberg, H., 1958
- Nysius wekiuicola Ashlock & Gagne, 1983

== Gallery ==
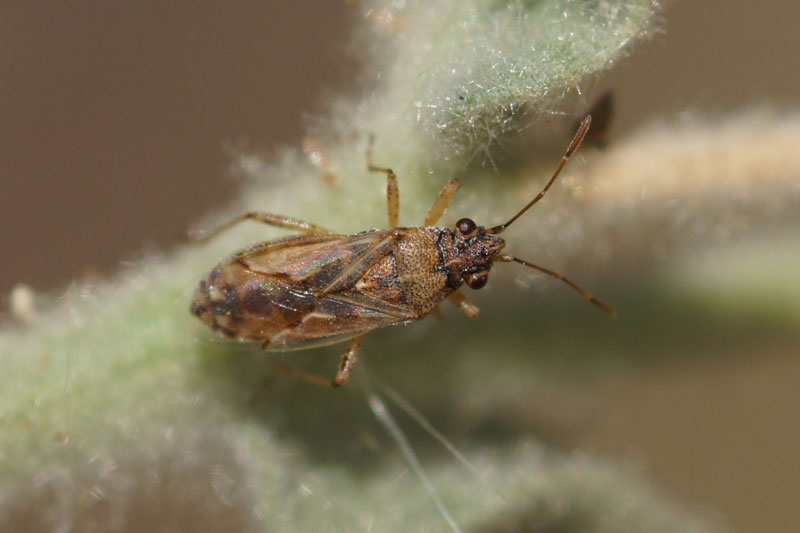
Nysius graminicola

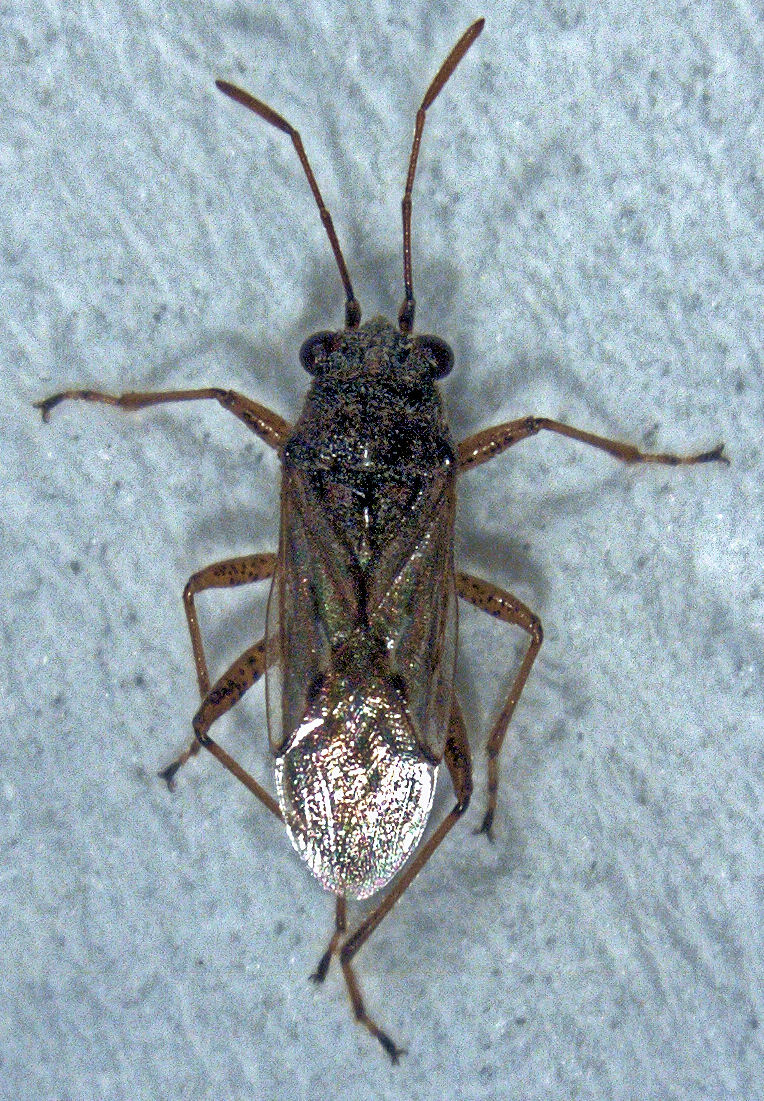
Nysius caledoniae male

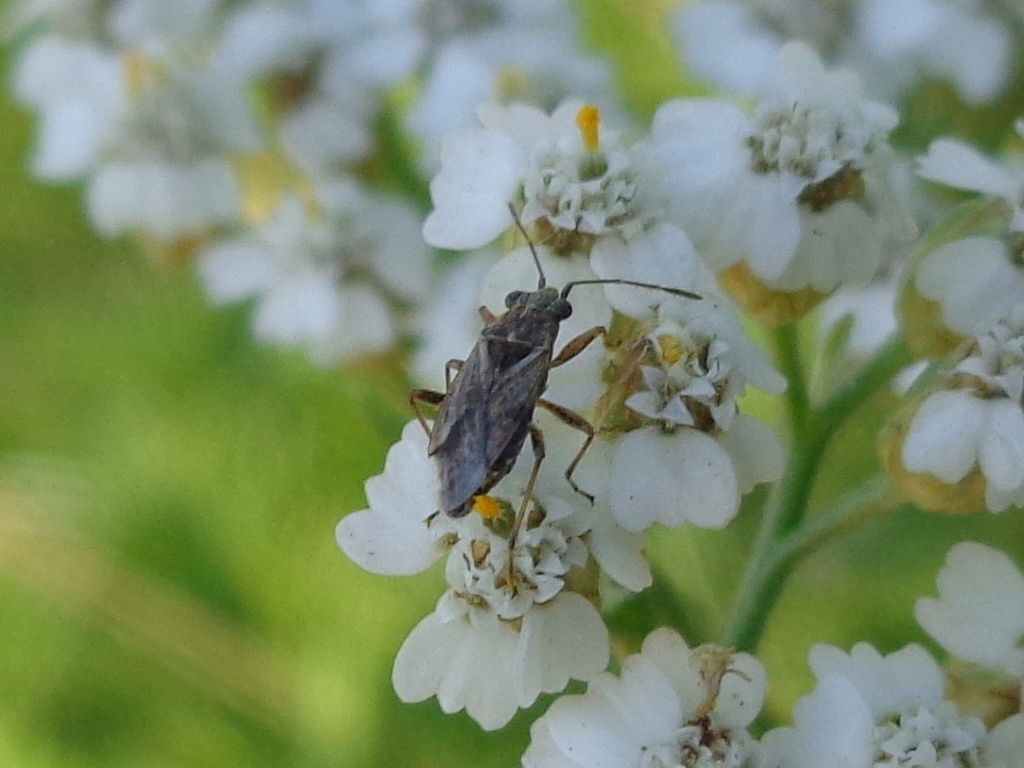
Nysius ericae

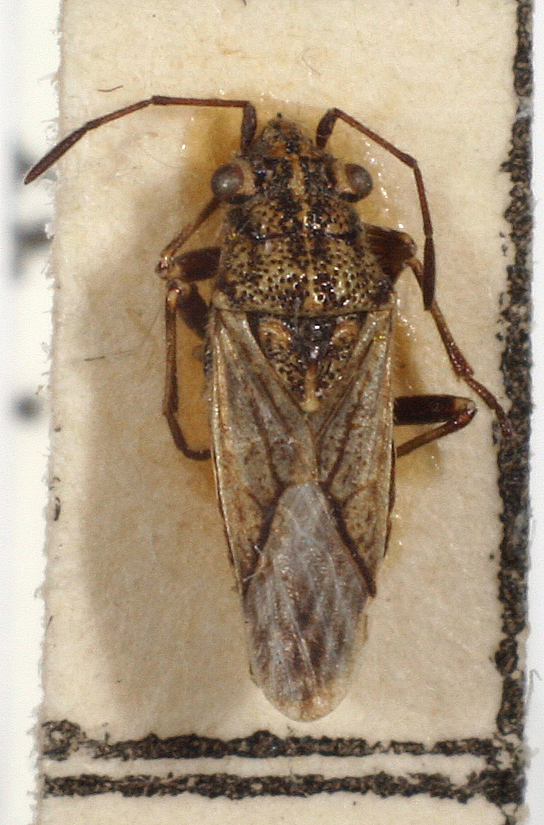
Nysius helveticus

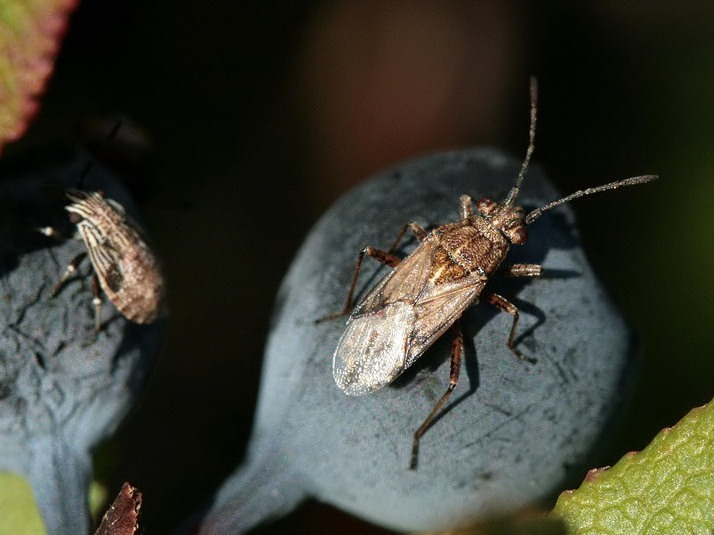
Nysius helveticus

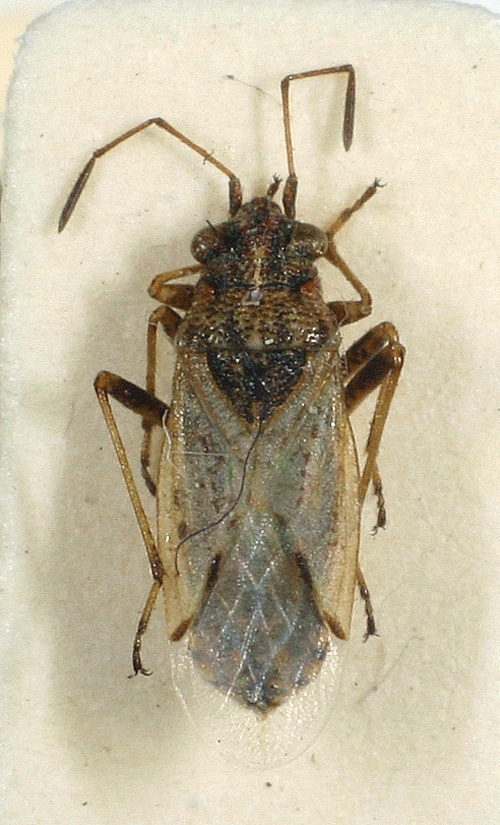
Nysius thymi

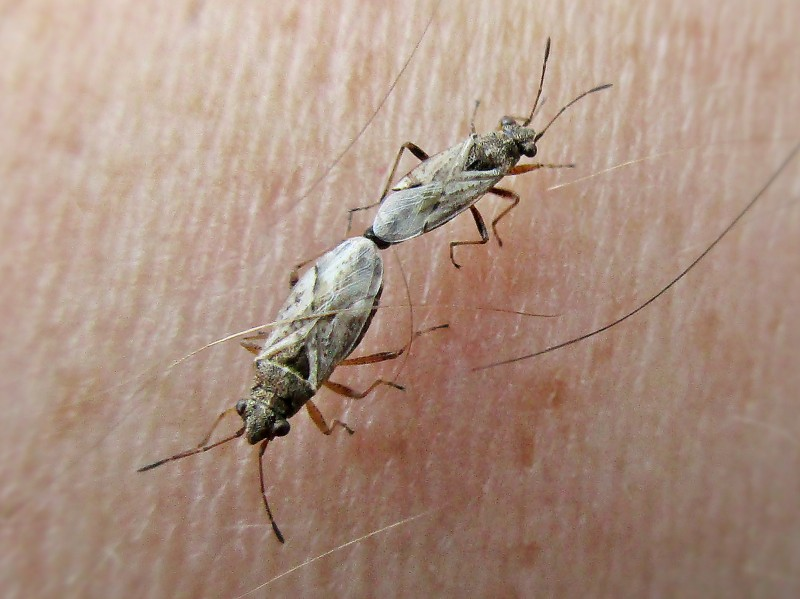
Nysius thymi

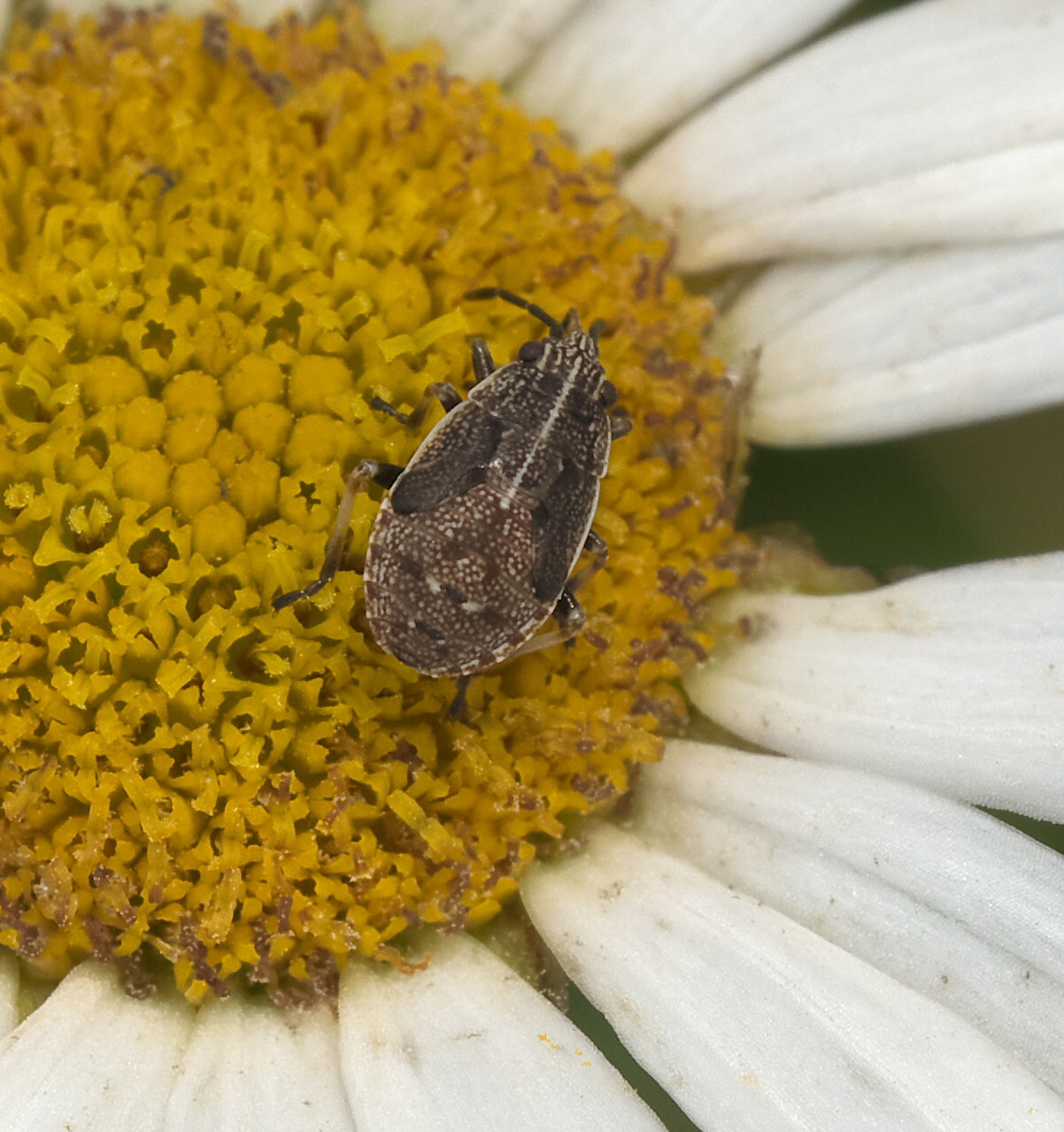
False chinch bug, Nysius

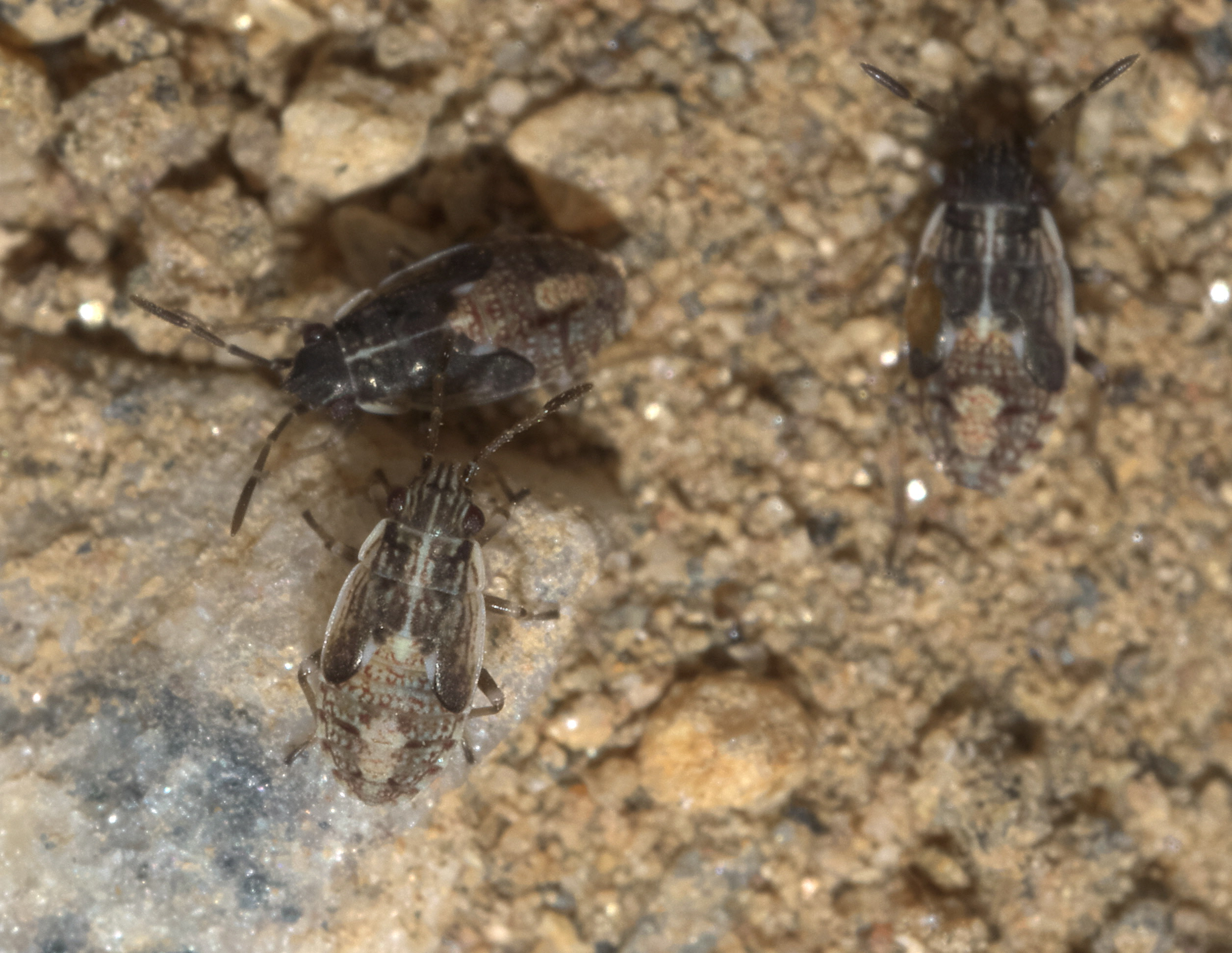
False chinch bug, Nysius

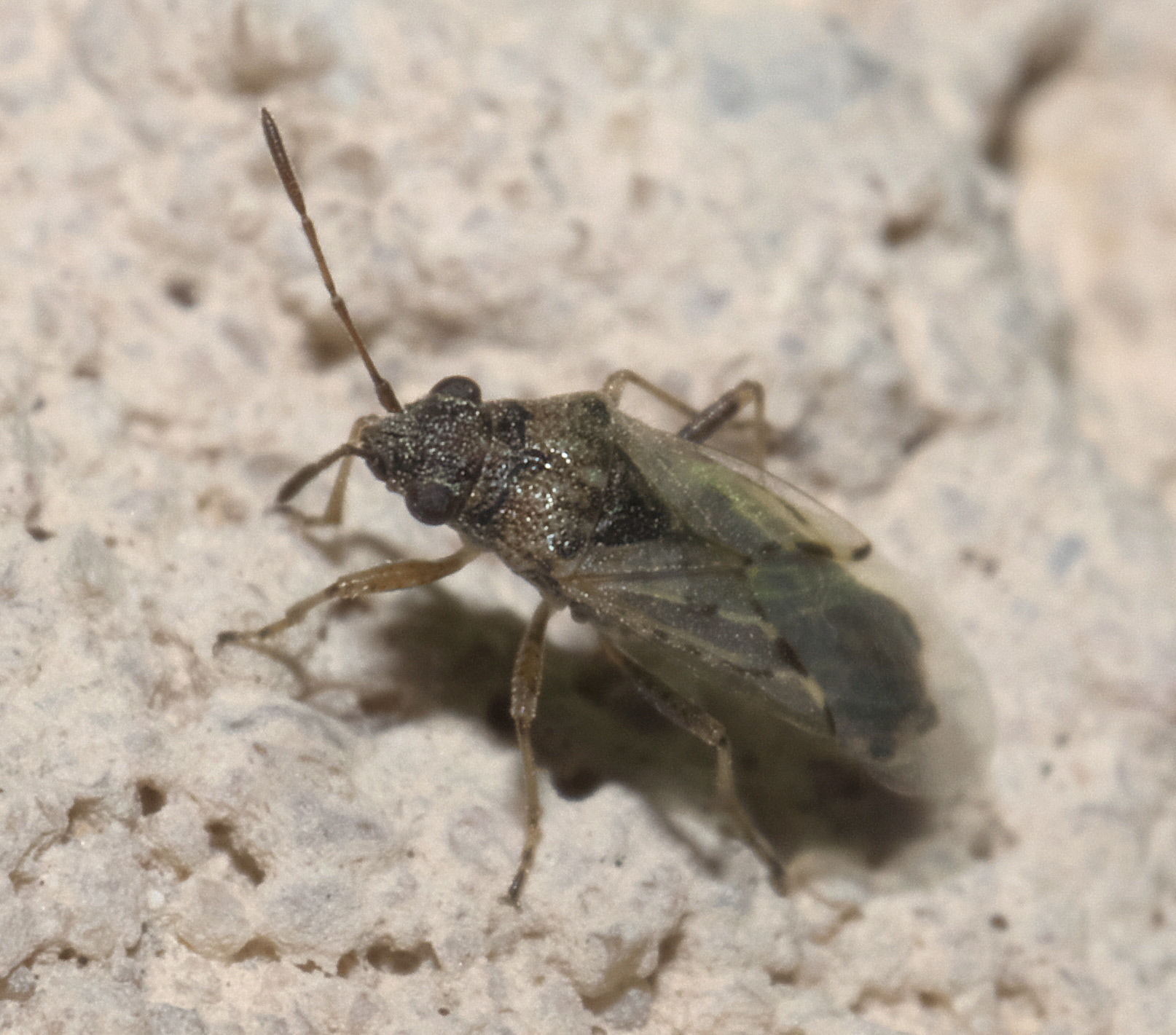
False chinch bug, Nysius

== See also ==
- Nysius species
