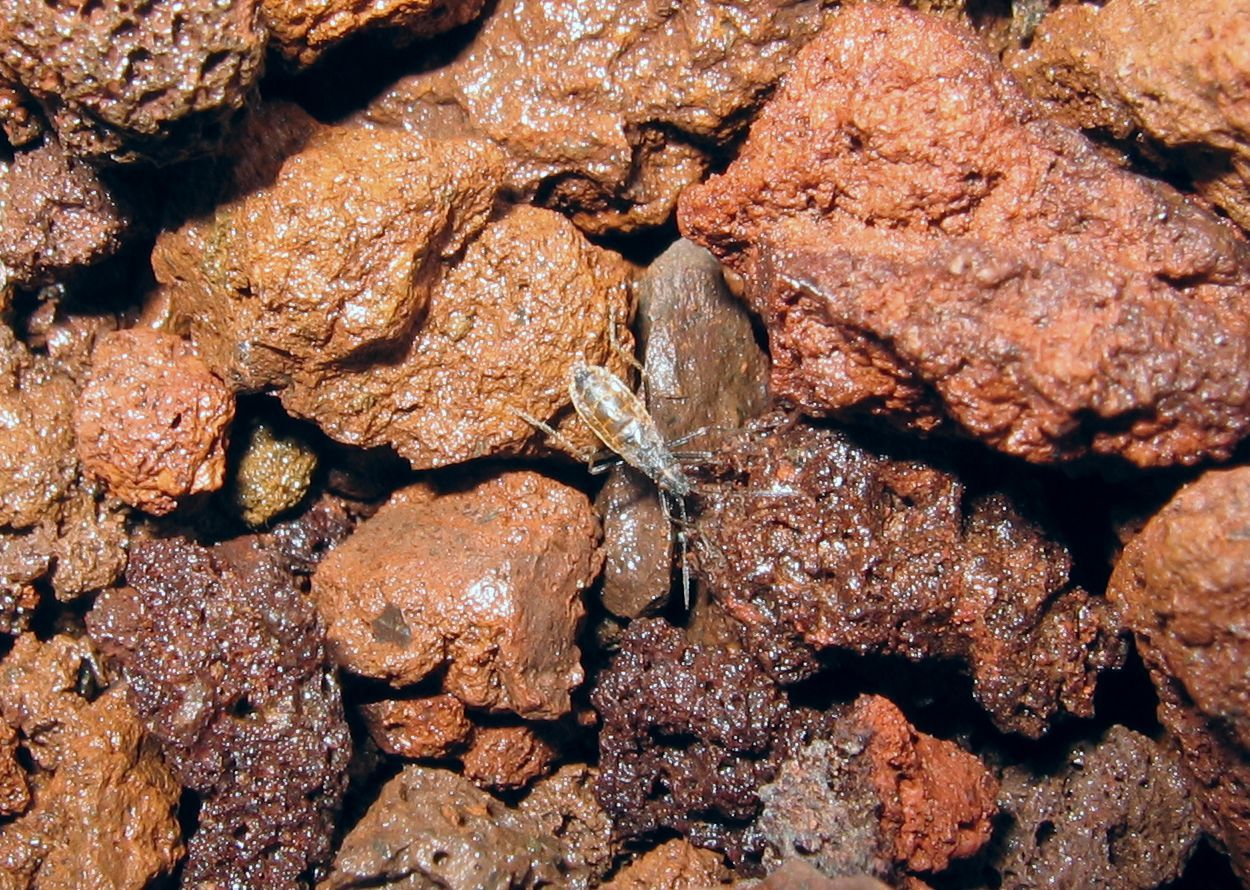

Scientific classification
- Kingdom: Animalia
- Phylum: Arthropoda
- Class: Insecta
- Order: Hemiptera
- Suborder: Heteroptera
- Family: Lygaeidae
- Genus: Nysius
- Species: N. wekiuicola

Binomial name
- Nysius wekiuicola Ashlock & Gagné, 1983

= Nysius wekiuicola =

Species of true bug

Nysius wekiuicola is a species of wēkiu bug (a type of seed bug in the genus Nysius) endemic to the area surrounding the summit of Mauna Kea, on the island of Hawaiʻi. It is closely related to Nysius aa, which is endemic to the summit of the neighboring Mauna Loa.

== Description ==
The wēkiu bug is flightless and inhabits the summit area of Mauna Kea, over 12,000 feet (3,700 m). It is named after Puʻu Wēkiu, which means "topmost hill" in the Hawaiian language, the summit peak of Mauna Kea.

== Ecology ==
The summit of Mauna Kea is a bleak, cold, apparently lifeless place with cinder cones on a plateau of lava, but a number of organisms have adapted to the inhospitable environment. These include lichens, algae, mosses, insects, spiders, and other small arthropods. At least 12 species of endemic arthropods live there, and the community is largely dependent on the wind-blown insects that are deposited there.

Unlike most other lygaeids, which eat seeds, the wēkiu bug has adapted to feed on insects that are blown up to the top of the mountain and die. This is not as small a resource as it might seem; snow packs at the summit are often covered with hundreds of them. When the snow melts, wēkiu bugs can be found at the edge, feeding on insects that drop out of the melting snow. They have an antifreeze protein in their blood that allows them to survive at low temperatures.

== Conservation ==
The stability of wēkiu bug populations has been a matter of controversy. Development of the summit area of Mauna Kea for telescopes has adversely affected the ecology of the area, including compaction of the loose cinder and traffic from tourism. Beyond the immediate vicinity of the summit, the bugs inhabit other cones that are well removed from activity.

Surveys by the University of Hawaii have shown populations to be stable, with population variations driven by precipitation on the summit area. As a result of ongoing population monitoring, a request to list the species as endangered was declined in 2011.

Studies over the last 11 years also indicate the wekiu bug has a stable population, and demonstrate that this species exhibits extreme variability in terms of annual densities at any given site, such that the normal bounds of natural population variance for this species are much wider than previously understood. Based on our review of the best available information, we no longer conclude that threats across the wekiu bug’s expanded range put the species in danger of extinction. In summary, because the wekiu bug is likely stable in numbers, the wekiu bug is more widespread than previously believed, current threats are minimized and restricted within the larger range of the species, and future potential threats are monitored, we find the wekiu bug does not meet the definition of a threatened or endangered species and no longer warrants listing throughout all or a significant portion of its range. Thus, we have removed it from candidate status.

The common name is also used to refer to the closely related Nysius aa, which occupies the same niche on Mauna Loa. It is even more poorly known than N. wekiuicola, but appears to be in less danger, since the summit of Mauna Loa is not under threat of development. Although it receives a large number of hikers, the area is largely made up of rocky lava rather than loose cinder, and is less vulnerable to human influence.

== See also ==
- Belgica antarctica
