= Nysius niger =

Scientific classification
- Domain: Eukaryota
- Kingdom: Animalia
- Phylum: Arthropoda
- Class: Insecta
- Order: Hemiptera
- Suborder: Heteroptera
- Family: Lygaeidae
- Genus: Nysius
- Species: N. niger

Binomial name
- Nysius niger Baker, 1906

Species of true bug

Nysius niger is a species of true bug in the family Lygaeidae. It is a pest of millets in the Americas.
