= Nysius fuscovittatus =

Scientific classification
- Domain: Eukaryota
- Kingdom: Animalia
- Phylum: Arthropoda
- Class: Insecta
- Order: Hemiptera
- Suborder: Heteroptera
- Family: Lygaeidae
- Tribe: Nysiini
- Genus: Nysius
- Species: N. fuscovittatus

Binomial name
- Nysius fuscovittatus Barber, 1958

Species of true bug

Nysius fuscovittatus is a species of seed bug in the family Lygaeidae. It is found in North America.
