= Wēkiu bug =

Wēkiu bug is the name given to two species of closely related flightless seed bugs in the genus Nysius that inhabit high elevations on the island of Hawaiʻi.

- Nysius aa is endemic to the area around the summit of Mauna Loa.
- Nysius wekiuicola is endemic to the area around the summit of Mauna Kea.
