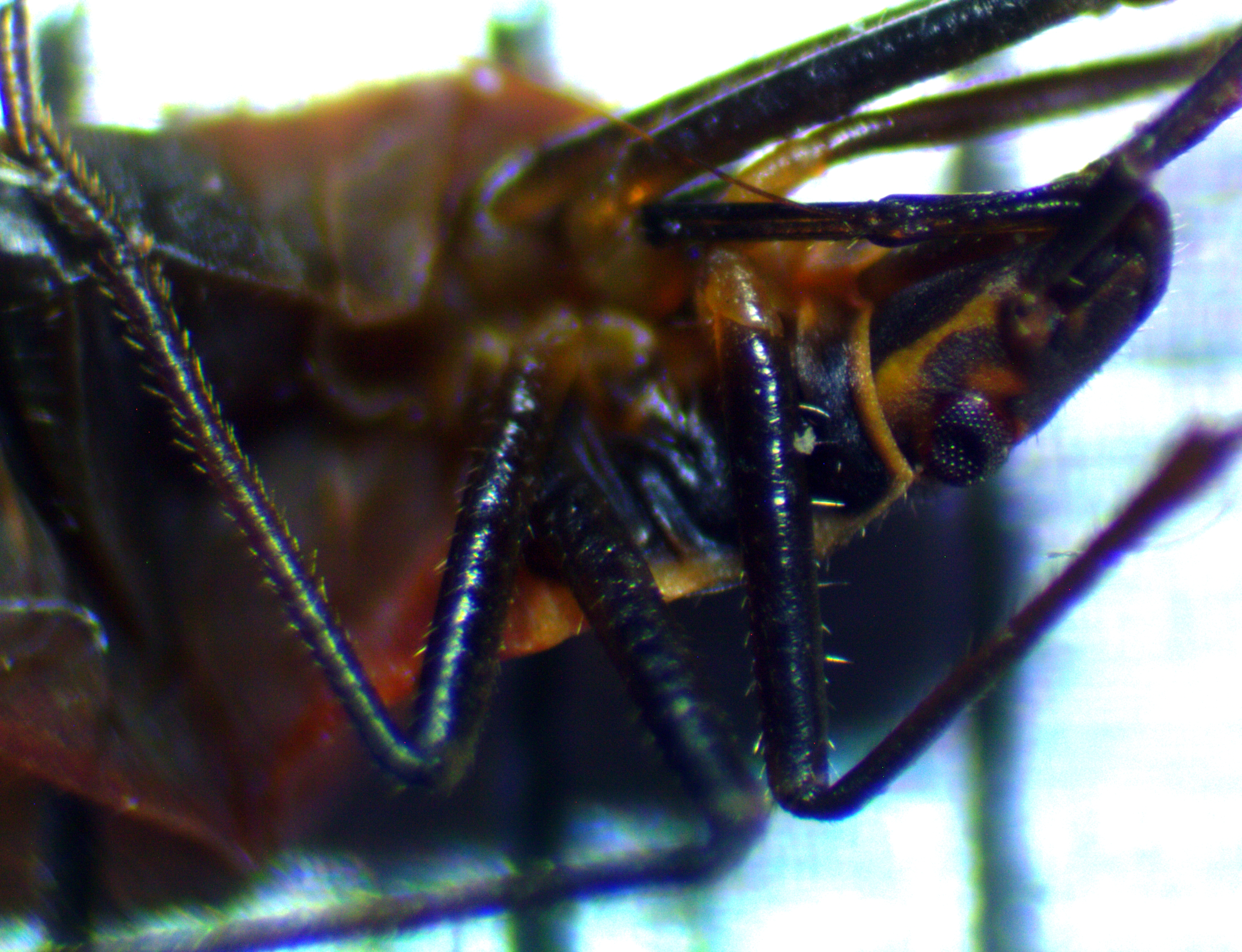

Scientific classification
- Domain: Eukaryota
- Kingdom: Animalia
- Phylum: Arthropoda
- Class: Insecta
- Order: Hemiptera
- Suborder: Heteroptera
- Family: Lygaeidae
- Genus: Nysius
- Species: N. aa

Binomial name
- Nysius aa 1996

= Nysius aa =

Species of Wēkiu bug

Nysius aa is a species of wēkiu bug (a type of seed bug in the genus Nysius) endemic to the area around the summit of Mauna Loa, on the island of Hawaiʻi. It is closely related to Nysius wekiuicola, which is another species of wēkiu bug endemic to the nearby Mauna Kea.
