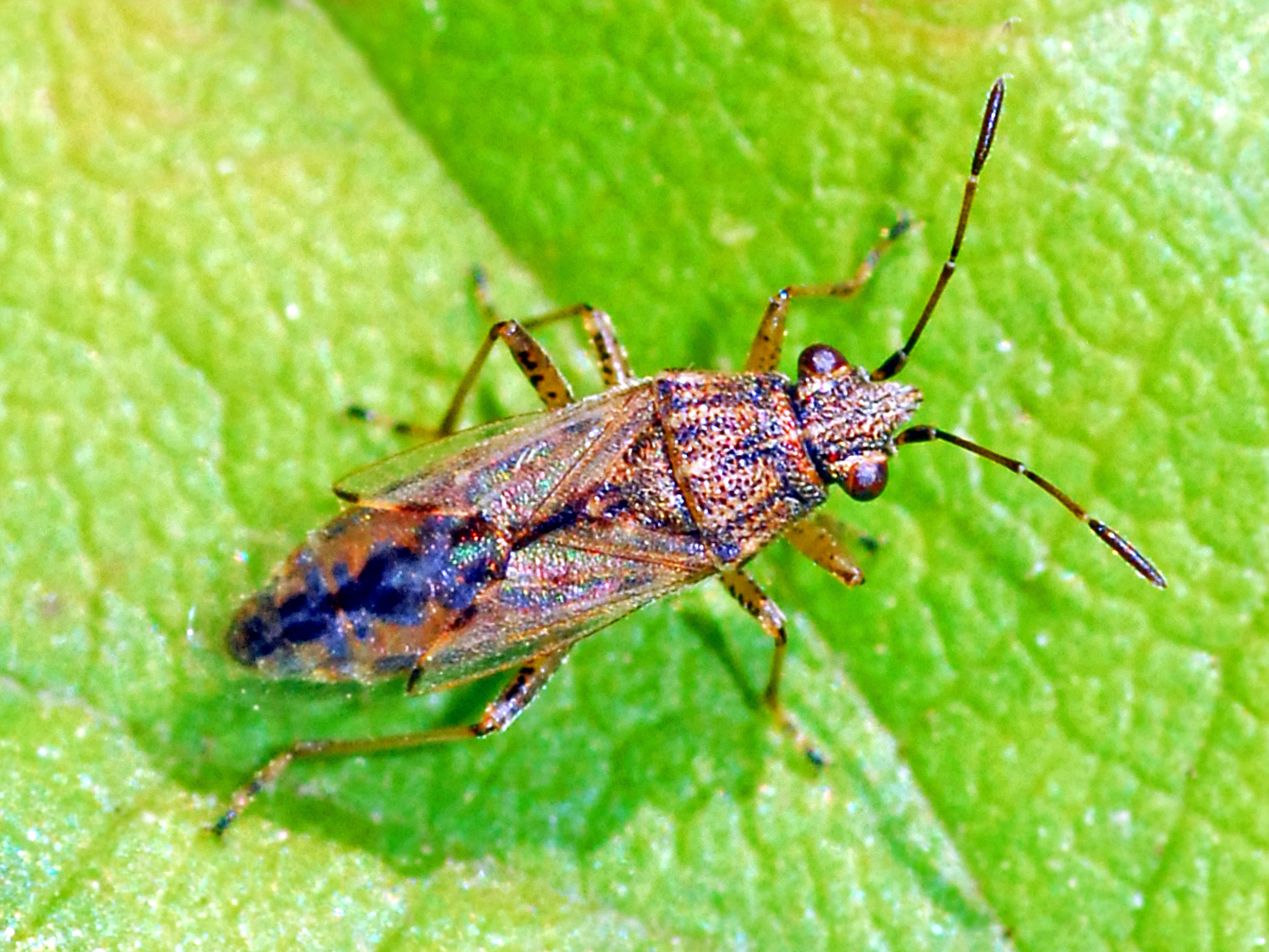

Scientific classification
- Domain: Eukaryota
- Kingdom: Animalia
- Phylum: Arthropoda
- Class: Insecta
- Order: Hemiptera
- Suborder: Heteroptera
- Family: Lygaeidae
- Genus: Nysius
- Species: N. graminicola

Binomial name
- Nysius graminicola (Kolenati, 1845)

Synonyms
- Corizus graminicola Kolenati, 1845

= Nysius graminicola =

Species of true bug

Nysius graminicola is a species of seed bug in the subfamily Orsillinae and in the family Lygaeidae.

== Taxonomy ==
The species is divided into four subspecies:

- Nysius graminicola graminicola (Kolenati, 1845)
- Nysius graminicola karaganus Hoberlandt, 1949
- Nysius graminicola lucida Popov, 1964
- Nysius graminicola stali Evans, 1929

== Distribution and habitat ==
The species is mainly found in Europe in the Mediterranean and Southeastern Europe. It is further distributed in North Africa, Asia Minor, Central Asia and China. They occur in dry, warm, open areas with a sandy bottom.

== Description ==
Nysius graminicola can reach a body length of about 3.6–5 mm (0.14–0.20 in). These seed bugs are yellowish brown-grey . The second segment of the antenna is light brown with a dark ring at the base. Two dark-brown stripes run across the head. The buccal is higher in front than in back. The hemielytrum (the partially hardened forewing) is slightly translucent and the corium (transparent part of the forewing) is clear and usually with almost no markings on the wing veins. The tawny legs are mottled with small dark dots. The species of the genus Nysius are very difficult to tell apart. This species is very similar to the Nysius senecionis, that has a shorter 1st segment of the posterior tarsus, which is less than the combined length of the 2nd and 3rd segments (including “claws”).

== Biology ==
These bugs are polyphagous, living on plants of the family Asteraceae, such as wormwood (Artemisia), chamomile (Matricaria), Chrysanthemum and Centaury (Centaurea), Most likely imagoes hibernate.
