= Nysius raphanus =

False chinch bug

Scientific classification
- Kingdom: Animalia
- Phylum: Arthropoda
- Class: Insecta
- Order: Hemiptera
- Suborder: Heteroptera
- Family: Lygaeidae
- Genus: Nysius
- Species: N. raphanus

Binomial name
- Nysius raphanus Howard, 1872

Species of true bug

Nysius raphanus (also known as the false chinch bug) is a small (no more than 1/8 inch) North American insect in the order Hemiptera and family Lygaeidae. They are grey to brown in color, with largely transparent wings, and can release an offensive odor similar to stinkbugs. They have no larval stage, instead going through several nymph stages with the nymphs resembling adults but having no wings. In high numbers false chinch bugs can cause significant plant damage.
