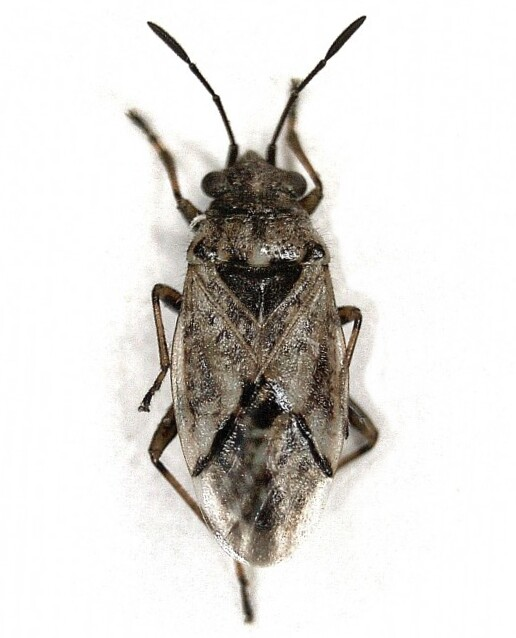

Scientific classification
- Kingdom: Animalia
- Phylum: Arthropoda
- Class: Insecta
- Order: Hemiptera
- Suborder: Heteroptera
- Family: Lygaeidae
- Genus: Nysius
- Species: N. huttoni

Binomial name
- Nysius huttoni White, 1878

= Nysius huttoni =

Species of true bug

Nysius huttoni, the wheat bug, are a species of seed bug, an insect in the family Lygaeidae. They are endemic to New Zealand, but were introduced to Europe. In New Zealand, they are an economically important pest of wheat and crops in the mustard family.

== Distribution and habitat ==
Although N. huttoni are naturally only found in New Zealand, they have also been introduced to Europe, including Belgium, France, the Netherlands, and the United Kingdom. Within New Zealand, they are widespread, being found on all three main islands as well as smaller islands such as the Chatham Islands and Three Kings Islands. Here, they occur in open and semi-open habitats from coastal to subalpine altitudes.
